= The Mighty Boosh (disambiguation) =

The Mighty Boosh is a British comedy troupe featuring comedians Julian Barratt and Noel Fielding.

The Mighty Boosh may also refer to:

- The Mighty Boosh (TV series)
- The Boosh (radio series), released on CD as The Mighty Boosh
- The Mighty Boosh (1998 stage show)
- The Mighty Boosh (2006 stage show)
