= The Mighty Boosh (2006 stage show) =

- Comedy tour by The Mighty Boosh
- Location: United Kingdom
- Start date: 1 February 2006
- End date: 18 April 2006
- No. of shows: 55

The Mighty Boosh concert chronology
- The Mighty Boosh (2006); The Mighty Boosh Live: Future Sailors Tour (2008–2009)

The Mighty Boosh was a stage show written and performed by Noel Fielding and Julian Barratt, who are also known as The Mighty Boosh. Michael Fielding, Rich Fulcher, and Dave Brown also appeared in the show. It toured from February 2006 to April 2006.

== Overview ==
The main story, "The Ruby of Kukundu" – in which Howard Moon (Barratt) and Vince Noir (N. Fielding) travel to the Arctic and Spain respectively in search of the mystical gem that can restore the life of their shaman friend, Naboo (M. Fielding), slain by The Hitcher (N. Fielding) – draws heavily upon the "Tundra" scenario used previously in the TV pilot, both the TV and radio series, and the Edinburgh show Arctic Boosh. There was also a cameo appearance by Matt Berry, reprising his role as Dixon Bainbridge. The stage show was later shown on television on Boxing Day 2007, and in December 2008, on BBC Three.

== DVD ==
The Mighty Boosh Live
- Directed by: Julian Barratt; Noel Fielding
- Release date: 13 November 2006

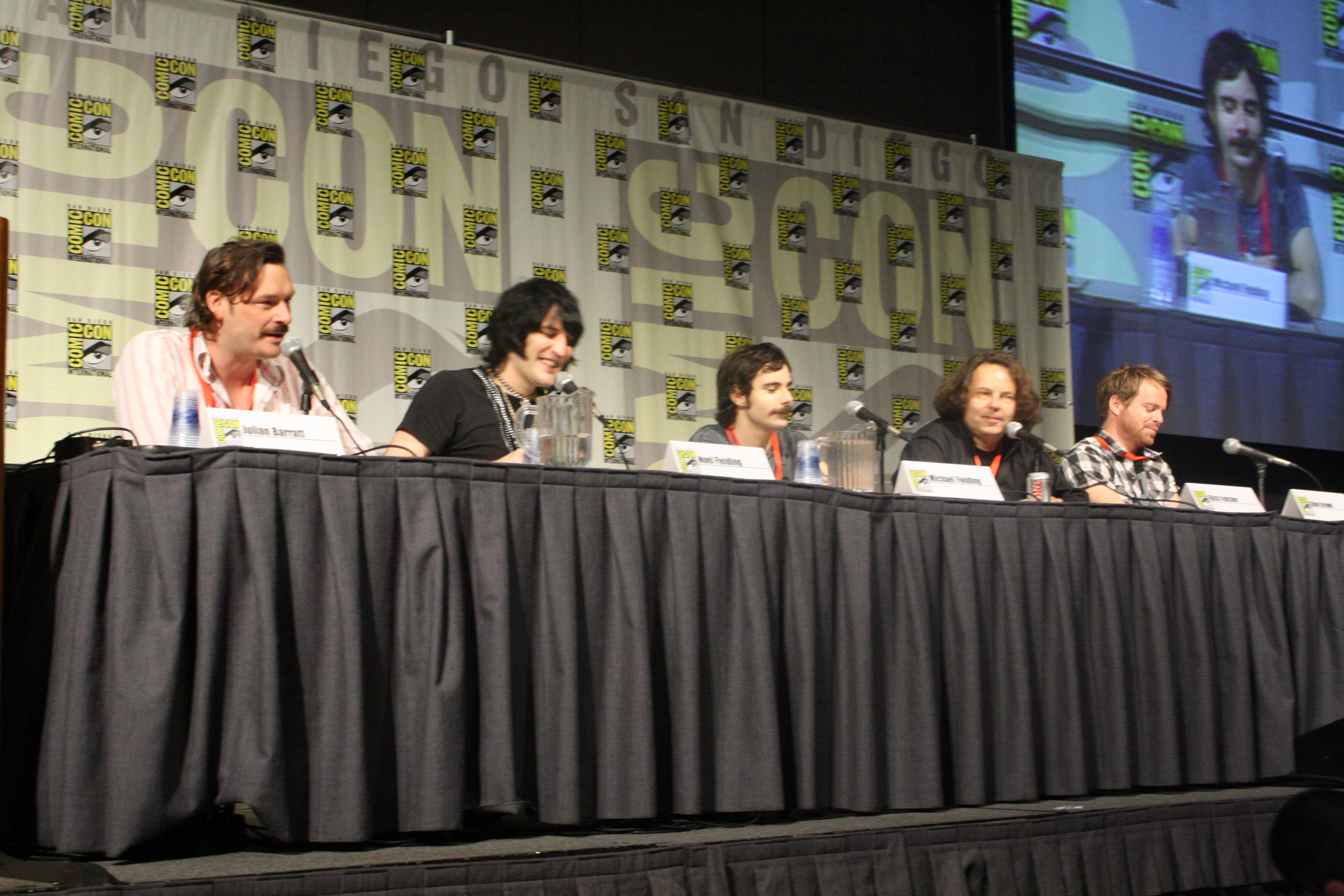
The cast of the Mighty Boosh at comic-con; from left to right Julian Barratt, Noel Fielding, Michael Fielding, Rich Fulcher and Dave Brown. 2009

The Mighty Boosh Live was released on DVD on 13 November 2006. Recorded at the Brixton Academy in April, the DVD features the full show, commentary, backstage footage, a Culture Show piece on the stage show, and deleted scenes.

== Tour dates ==
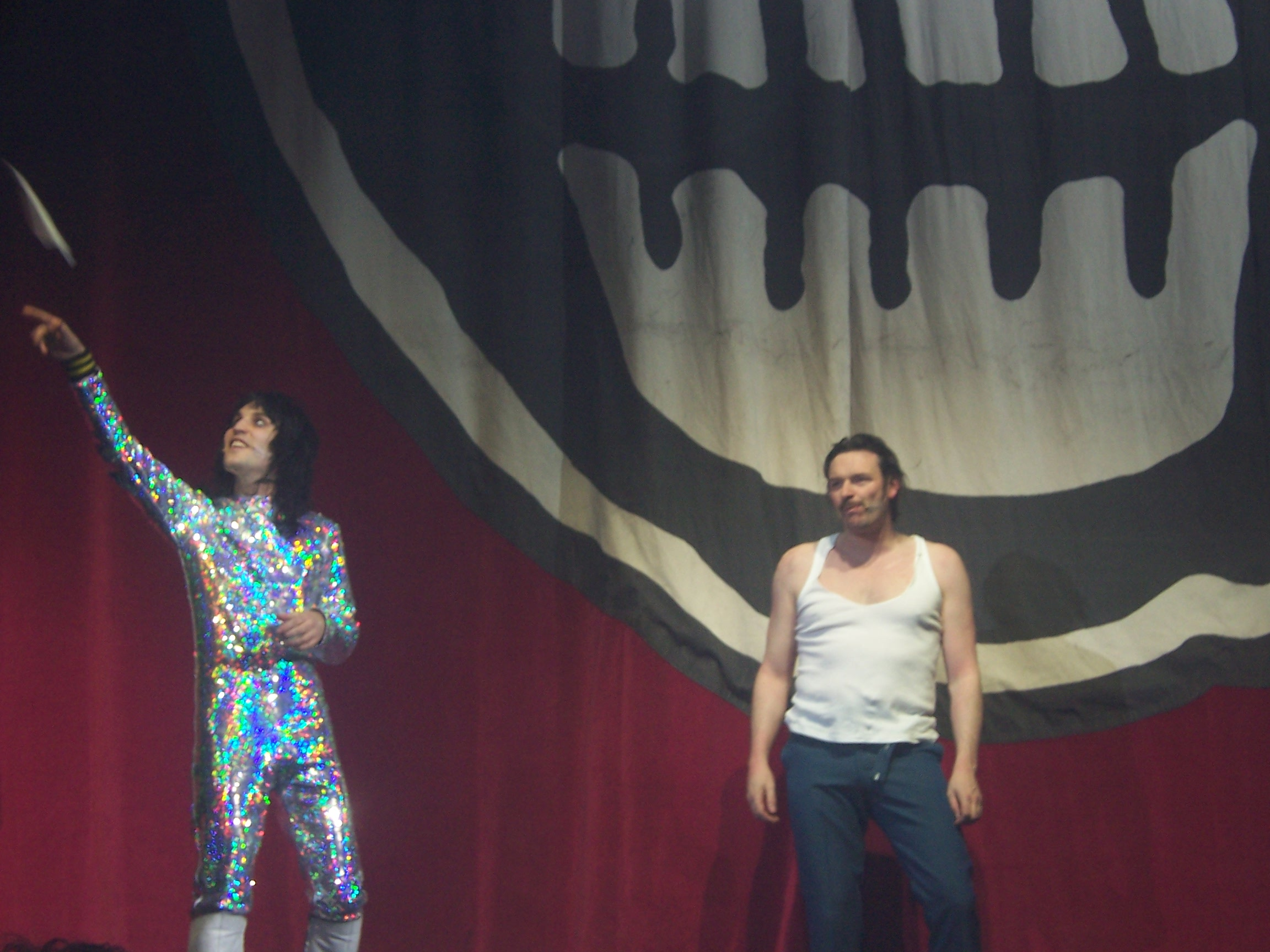
Noel Fielding and Julian Barret as Vince Noir and Howard Moon in the stageshow The Mighty Boosh Live at the Brighton Dome. Date: 11 February 2006

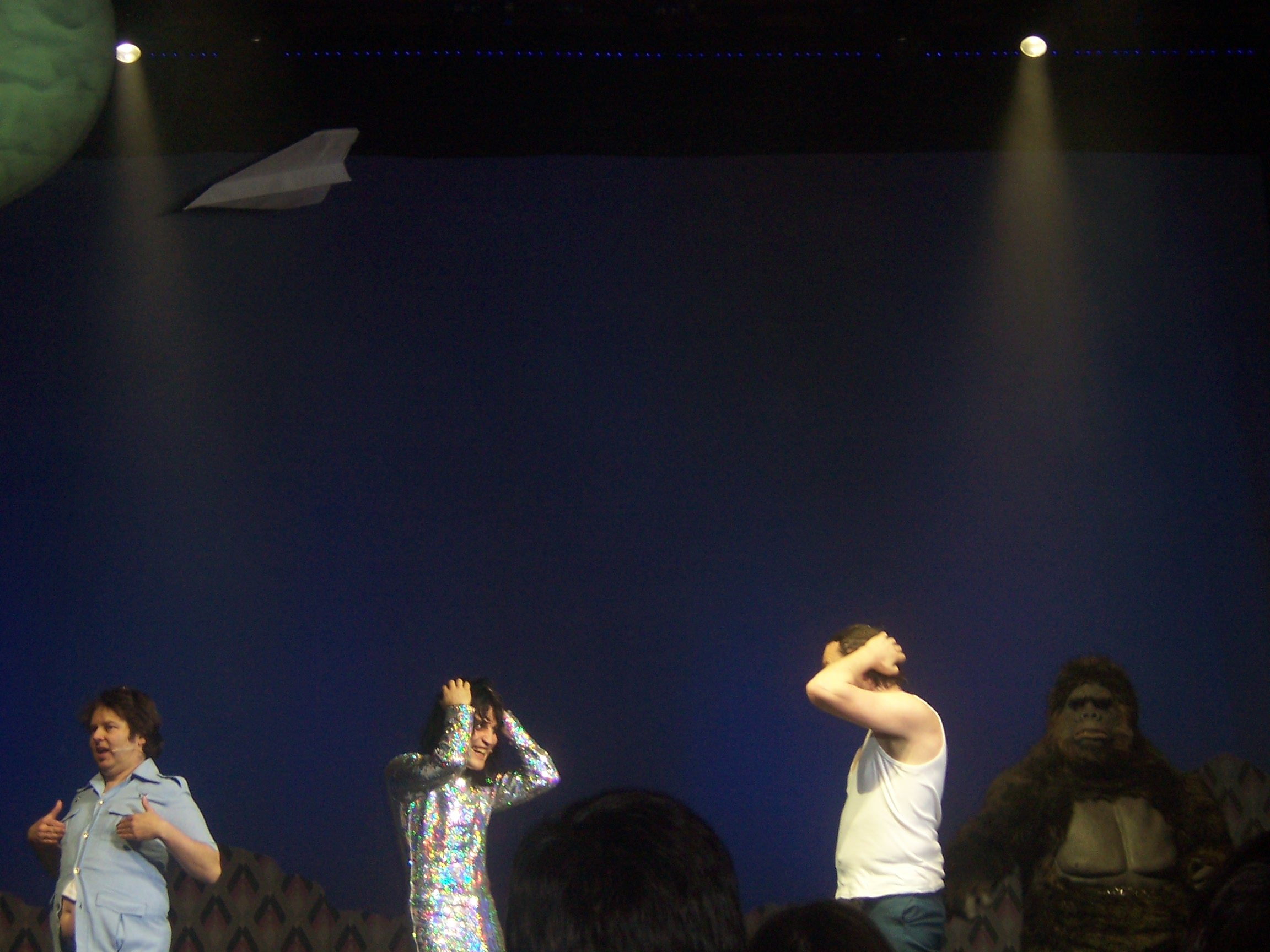
A performance of the stageshow The Mighty Boosh Live at the Brighton Dome. From left to right; Rich Fulcher, Noel Fielding, Julian Barret, Dave Brown. 11 February 2006

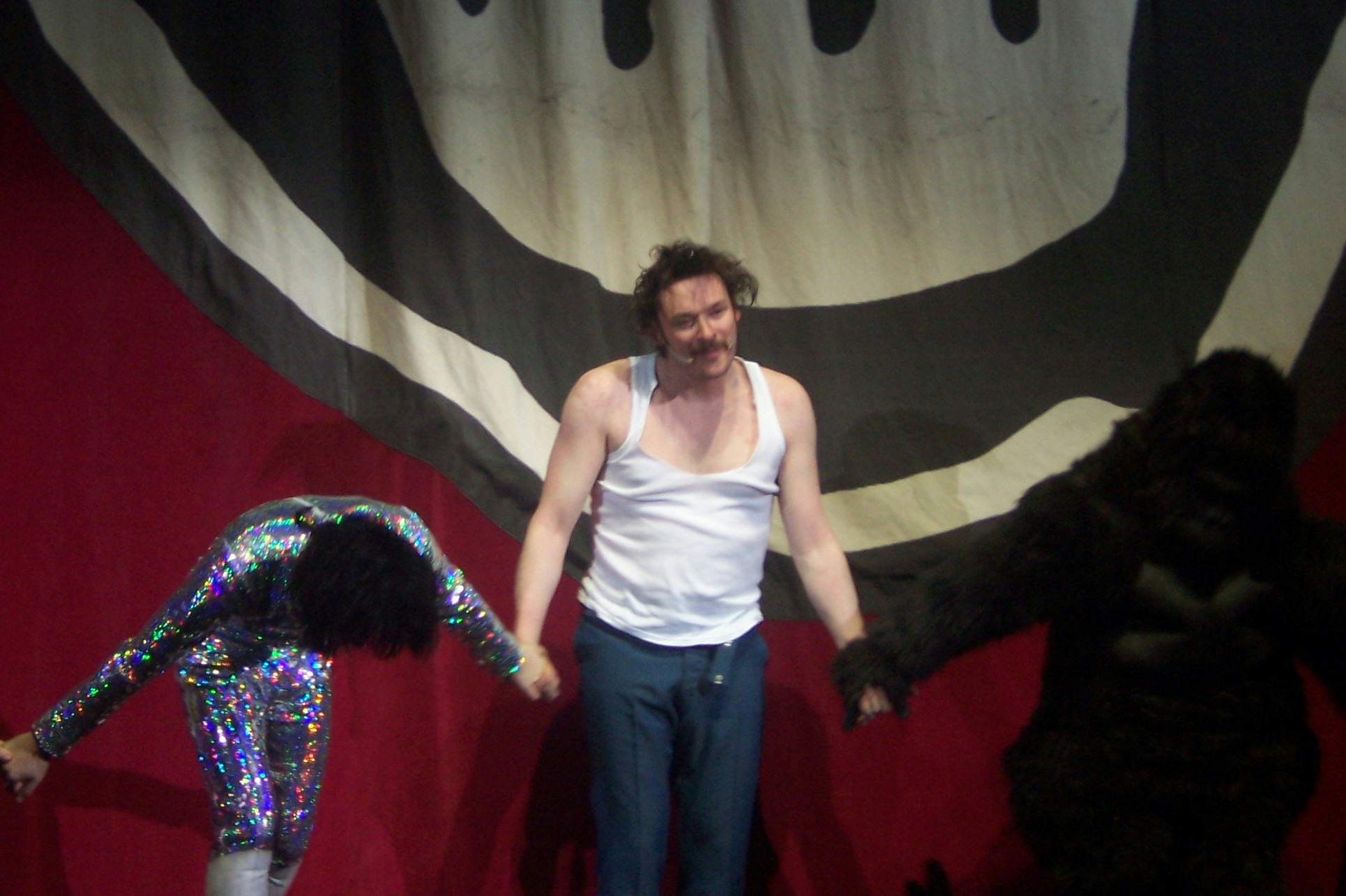
A performance of the stageshow The Mighty Boosh Live at the Brighton Dome. From left to right; Noel Fielding, Julian Barret, Dave Brown. 11 February 2006

| Date | City | Country | Venue |
|---|---|---|---|
| 5 December 2005 | London | England | Pleasance Theatre (Warm-up shows) |
| 12 December 2005 | London | England | Pleasance Theatre (Warm-up shows) |
| 19 December 2005 | London | England | Pleasance Theatre (Warm-up shows) |
| 9 January 2006 | London | England | Pleasance Theatre (Warm-up shows) |
| 16 January 2006 | London | England | Pleasance Theatre (Warm-up shows) |
| 20 January 2006 | London | England | Pleasance Theatre (Warm-up shows) |
| 21 January 2006 | London | England | Pleasance Theatre (Warm-up shows) |
| 1 February 2006 | York | England | Grand Opera House |
| 2 February 2006 | Derby | England | Assembly Rooms |
| 3 February 2006 | London | England | New Wimbledon Theatre |
| 4 February 2006 | Reading | England | The Hexagon |
| 5 February 2006 | Salford | England | The Lowry |
| 7 February 2006 | Portsmouth | England | Guildhall |
| 9 February 2006 | Southampton | England | Guildhall |
| 10 February 2006 | Folkestone | England | Leas Cliff Hall |
| 11 February 2006 | Brighton | England | Dome |
| 12 February 2006 | Coventry | England | Warwick Arts Centre |
| 14 February 2006 | Leicester | England | De Montfort Hall |
| 15 February 2006 | Croydon | England | Fairfield Halls |
| 16 February 2006 | Basingstoke | England | The Anvil |
| 17 February 2006 | Birmingham | England | Alexandra Theatre |
| 18 February 2006 | Oxford | England | New Theatre |
| 19 February 2006 | Cambridge | England | Corn Exchange |
| 21 February 2006 | Peterborough | England | Broadway Theatre |
| 22 February 2006 | Sheffield | England | City Hall |
| 23 February 2006 | Bradford | England | St George's Hall |
| 25 February 2006 | Coventry | England | Warwick Arts Centre |
| 26 February 2006 | Liverpool | England | Rawhide at Royal Court Theatre |
| 1 March 2006 | Bournemouth | England | Pavilion Theatre |
| 2 March 2006 | Ipswich | England | Regent Theatre |
| 3 March 2006 | Grimsby | England | Auditorium |
| 4 March 2006 | Glasgow | Scotland | Pavilion |
| 8 March 2006 | Warrington | England | Parr Hall |
| 9 March 2006 | Wolverhampton | England | Civic Hall |
| 10 March 2006 | Southport | England | Southport Theatre |
| 12 March 2006 | Bristol | England | Hippodrome |
| 14 March 2006 | Plymouth | England | Pavilions |
| 15 March 2006 | Nottingham | England | Royal Centre |
| 16 March 2006 | Newcastle upon Tyne | England | City Hall |
| 17 March 2006 | Blackburn | England | King George's Hall |
| 18 March 2006 | Cardiff | Wales | St David's Hall |
| 21 March 2006 | Stoke-on-Trent | England | Victoria Hall |
| 22 March 2006 | Manchester | England | Carling Apollo |
| 23 March 2006 | Carlisle | England | Sands Centre |
| 24 March 2006 | Edinburgh | Scotland | Festival Theatre |
| 5 April 2006 | Manchester | England | Carling Apollo |
| 6 April 2006 | Manchester | England | Carling Apollo |
| 21 April 2006 | Brixton | England | Academy (DVD recording) |
| 22 April 2006 | Brixton | England | Academy (DVD recording) |
