= The Mighty Boosh =

British comedy troupe

- The Mighty Boosh; From left to right: Howard Moon (Julian Barratt), Bollo (Dave Brown), Naboo the Enigma (Michael Fielding), Vince Noir (Noel Fielding) and Bob Fossil (Rich Fulcher)
- Notable work: The Mighty Boosh (stage show, 1998); Arctic Boosh (stage show, 1999); Autoboosh (2000); The Boosh (2001); The Mighty Boosh (TV, 2004–2007); The Mighty Boosh Live (2006); The Mighty Book of Boosh (Book, 2008); The Mighty Boosh Live: Future Sailors Tour (2008–09); The Mighty Decider (iPhone app, 2010)

Comedy career
- Years active: 1998–2009, 2013
- Medium: Theatre, radio, television
- Genres: Double act, surreal humour, new wave
- Subjects: Surrealism, fashion victims, fantasy, music
- Members: Julian Barratt; Noel Fielding; Dave Brown; Michael Fielding; Rich Fulcher
- Website: The Mighty Boosh Online websites

The Mighty Boosh is a British comedy troupe featuring comedians Julian Barratt and Noel Fielding. Developed from three stage shows, The Mighty Boosh, Arctic Boosh (1999) and Autoboosh (2000), as well as a six-episode radio series, it has since spanned a total of 20 television episodes for BBC Three which aired from 2004 to 2007, and two live tours of the UK, as well as two live shows in the United States. The first television series is set in a zoo operated by Bob Fossil, the second in a flat and the third in a secondhand shop in Dalston called Nabootique.

The style of humour in the Mighty Boosh is often described as being surreal, as well as escapist and new wave comedy.

Various members of The Mighty Boosh have appeared in a number of different comedy series including Nathan Barley, Snuff Box and Noel Fielding's Luxury Comedy. Regular Boosh collaborators include Michael Fielding, Rich Fulcher, Dave Brown, Nigel Coan, Richard Ayoade and Matt Berry. The troupe is named after a childhood hairstyle of co-star Michael Fielding.

== History ==
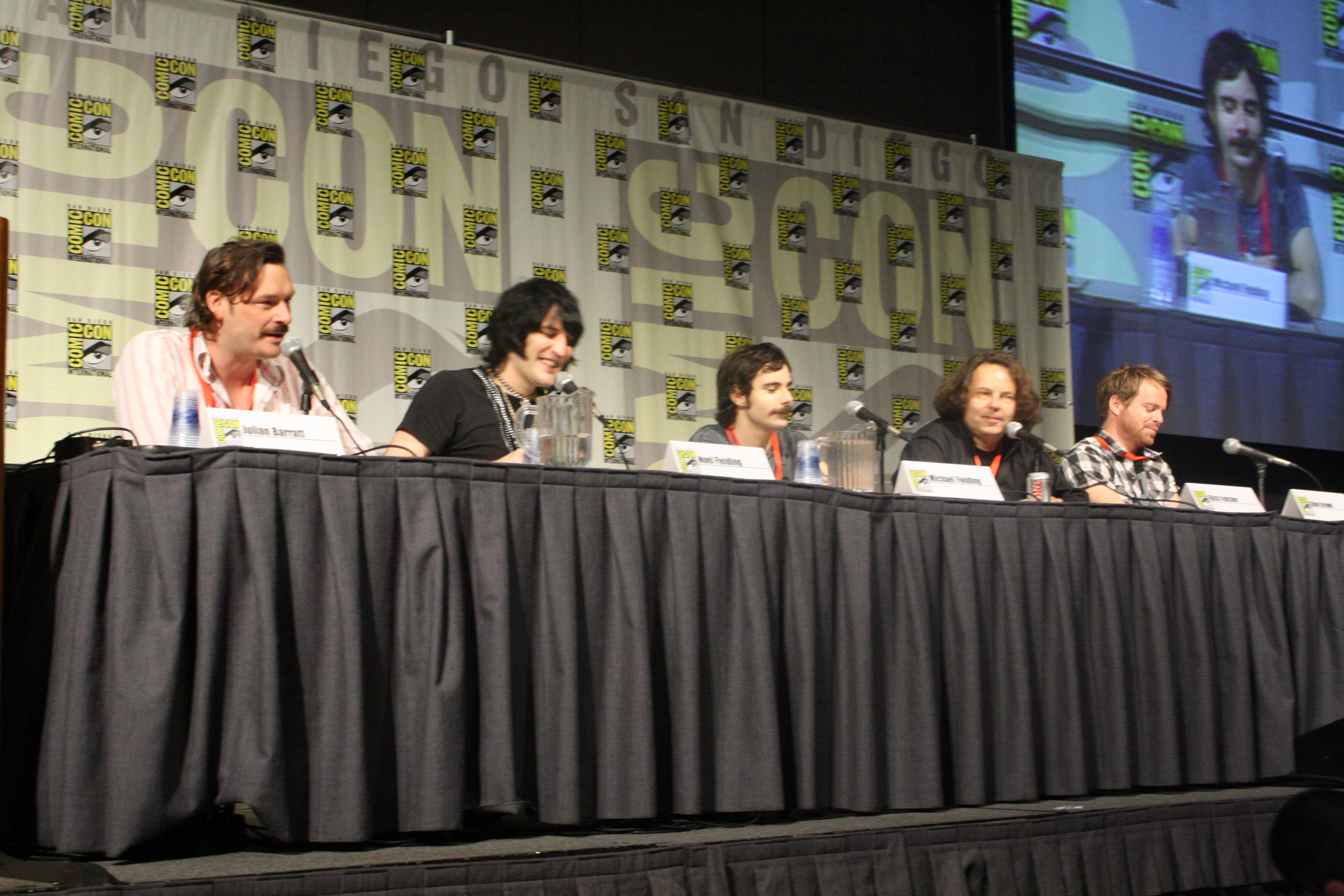
The cast of the Mighty Boosh at comic-con; from left to right Julian Barratt, Noel Fielding, Michael Fielding, Rich Fulcher and Dave Brown. 2009

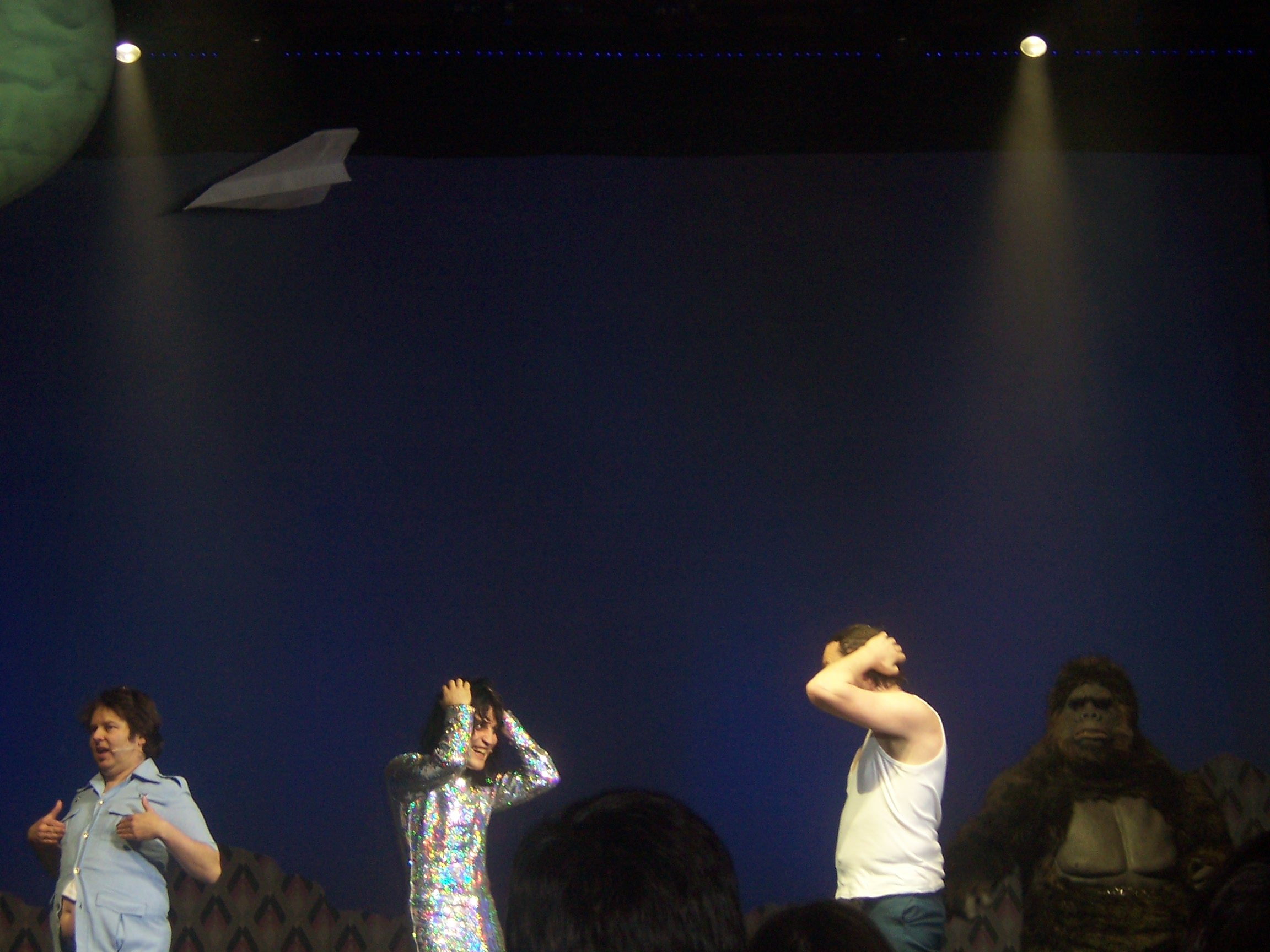
A performance of the stageshow The Mighty Boosh Live at the Brighton Dome. From left to right; Rich Fulcher, Noel Fielding, Julian Barratt, Dave Brown. February 2006

Noel Fielding first met Mighty Boosh collaborator Dave Brown whilst Fielding was studying a foundation course in fine arts at the Croydon School of Art. Then from 1992 to 1995 Fielding studied Graphic Design and Advertising at Buckinghamshire College of Higher Education in Wycombe. and whilst there both Dave Brown and Nigel Coan were studying the same course as Fielding and all three shared a student house together. After they had lived together in student housing, Fielding, Brown and Coan then later lived together in a flat in Hackney in London.

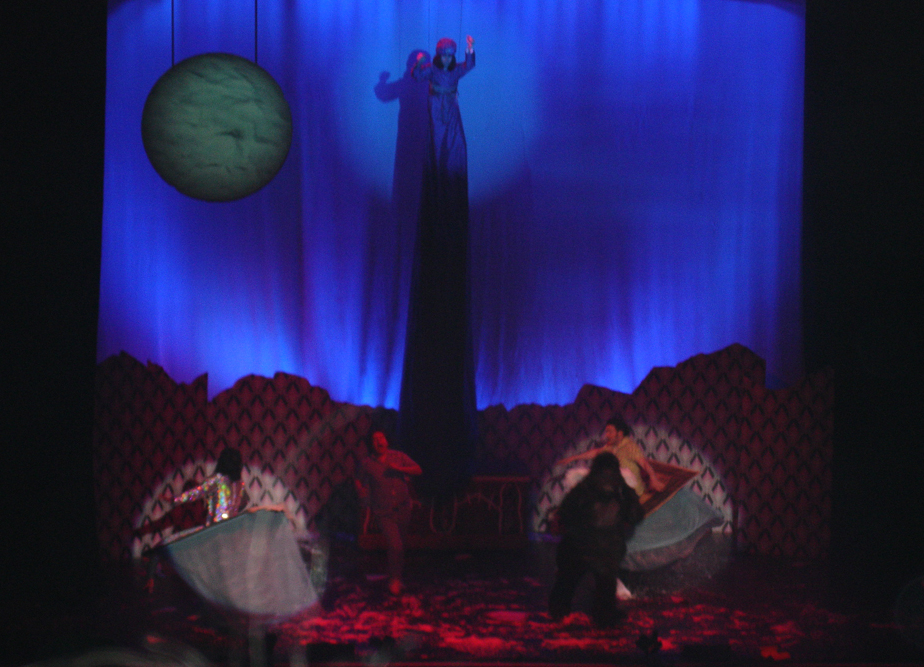
The magic carpet-assisted finale of a Mighty Boosh Live stageshow from 2006. From Left to right;Noel Fielding as Vince Noir, Rich Fulcher as Bob Fossil, Michael Fielding as Naboo, Dave Brown as Bollo and Julian Barratt as Howard Moon.

Fielding and Brown met Barratt through the comedy scene in Wycombe. After Fielding entered the Daily Telegraph open mic award and attended the final at the Edinburgh comedy festival he was signed to Avalon talent agency and through Avalon began performing on the same comedy bills as Barratt. Whilst performing on the comedy network together on the same bill they realised they had common interests and began writing and performing together.

Their first show together was around 1998, and it was commented by Nigel Coan with whom they collaborated with on Mighty Boosh that "They did their first gig at Oranje Boom Boom which is sort of in Chinatown in London, and ah, which was ridiculous, I mean it was really, like, ridiculous costumes and um, they didn't know what... they really [didn't] know what they were doing... ...It was very raw, but it was, it was hilarious..." After Barratt and Fielding's first performance together at Oranje Boom Boom at bar De Hems, in London in April 1998, they developed their zookeeper characters, Howard Moon and Vince Noir, in a series of sketches for Paramount Comedy’s Unnatural Acts with Barratt commenting that "Early on we had Rich Fulcher, we were working on a sketch show...".

Nigel Coan has commented further on them developing the Mighty Boosh "...They thought let's do a show, an Edinburgh show. I think they started to think about doing that. So they got a gig at Hen and Chickens...". Dave Brown, who also collaborated on the Mighty Boosh with them, commented further on their time at the Hen and chickens which is a theatre bar in Islington, London, "They would use the Hen and Chickens as this kind of... place to, a platform to just try stuff out and it was just a great little place they could do a regular spot... ...where they would probably write and have ideas in the week, try stuff out for half of that and then for the rest of it, it would just be improv and mucking about. Then they took the, um, took The Mighty Boosh up to Edinburgh and then two more shows Arctic Boosh (1999), Autoboosh (2000)...".

Fielding and Barratt commented on their time at the Hen and Chickens, with Fielding commenting that "...cos it'd be stand up and people would come on and do straight stand up. And then we used to put potted plants all around the gig and music on... ...to try and make it into a sort of play... people couldn't believe the audacity. It got some sort of reputation as being sort of enigmatic but we're just really unprofessional. We didn't know anything about theatre or what you did." with Barratt responding to Fielding "Speak for yourself, I was in a Sartre play at university I'll have you know. Huis Clos." Fielding has commented further on their first live show, The Mighty Boosh, “Julian had a song about a mammoth that he wanted to sing to a girl in the audience, and I had a few ideas for some weird sketches... ...We started working on our ideas together... ...We were zookeepers and we got sucked through our bosses’ eyes and into a magic forest..."

Michael Fielding and Richard Ayoade both performed with the Mighty Boosh in 2002 during a live run through of a Mighty Boosh pilot. Richard Ayoade played adventurer Dixon Bainbridge, but Matt Berry replaced him in the first television series, since Ayoade was under contract with Channel 4. Ayoade returned in the second and third series as a belligerent shaman named Saboo. The name "Mighty Boosh" was originally a phrase used by a friend of Michael Fielding's to describe the hair that Michael had as a child.

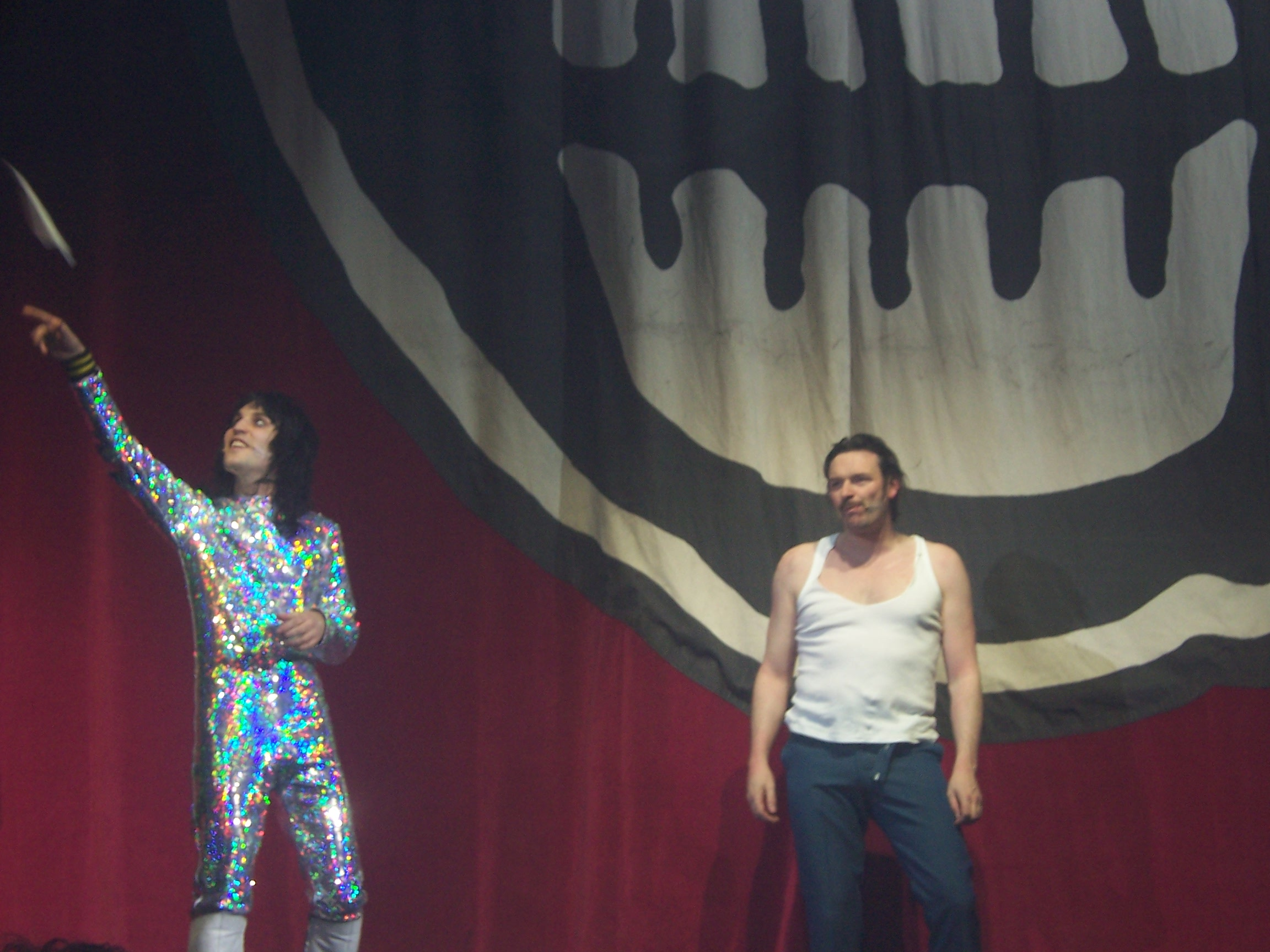
Noel Fielding and Julian Barratt as Vince Noir and Howard Moon in the stageshow The Mighty Boosh Live at the Brighton Dome. February 2006

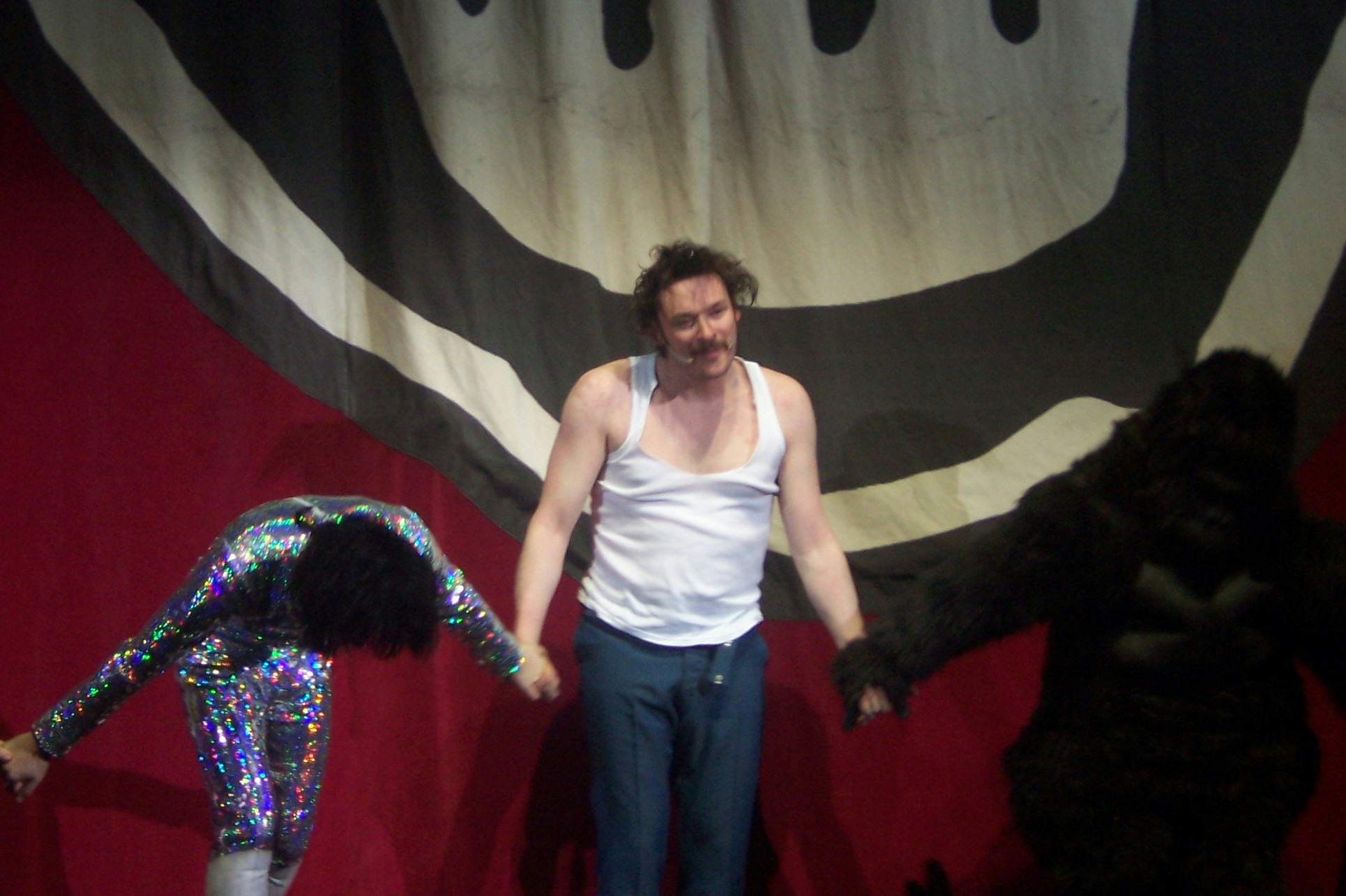
A performance of the stageshow The Mighty Boosh Live at the Brighton Dome. From left to right; Noel Fielding, Julian Barret, Dave Brown. February 2006

All three of the Mighty Boosh stage shows – The Mighty Boosh (1998), Arctic Boosh (1999) and Autoboosh (2000) – were taken to the Edinburgh Fringe with Autoboosh also being taken to the Melbourne International Comedy festival in 2000 where it won the Melbourne International Comedy Festival Award. The Mighty Boosh 1998 stage show won the Perrier best newcomer award at the Edinburgh Festival and was taken to the Sydney Comedy festival and Arctic Boosh was also taken to the Sydney Comedy Festival and was directed by Stewart Lee. With the success of Autoboosh, a radio series was commissioned by the BBC. Produced by Danny Wallace, The Boosh radio show was a six-part series that was first broadcast in 2001 on BBC London Live, later transferring to BBC Radio 4, and Barratt has humorously commented that "...so we did a radio show, we did, we sort of recorded it in a sort of old railway sort of arch... [with Fielding adding] in Shoreditch... ....built our studio out of weird... little children's toys...".

In 2001 the Mighty Boosh was included as a 3-minute segment in a new 60-minute pilot that was filmed to pitch a new TV show titled "Head Farm" to Channel 4. The pilot was directed by Stewart Lee and was described as a Friday Night Live style format that featured eight comedians as well as Richard Ayoade who performed alongside Matt Holness in their act Garth Marenghi's Fright Knight. The pilot ended up not being commissioned as a television series.

After Baby Cow productions had seen them performing at the Hen and Chickens as well as seeing Arctic Boosh at the Edinburgh festival in 1999, the idea for a TV show was pitched to the BBC and Fielding and Barratt were given a half-hour television pilot and it was commented that the Mighty Boosh "... almost didn't make it to television. Around 2000, Barratt and Fielding disappeared into development hell. They had done a sketch show for Radio 4, but no one was sure how to translate their act on to TV. That's until Steve Coogan, who had seen them in Edinburgh in 1999 when they were performing as Arctic Boosh, moved things along. His production company... ...sold the concept to the BBC simply by saying: 'If we were young, we'd want to be them.'" The pilot episode was filmed in front of a live studio audience and Matt Lucas and David Walliams were present in the audience. Barratt has further commented that "...we wanted to get on TV but it'd been a lot of trouble because they thought it was eh, the scripts we sort of gave them were sort of like massive epic adeventures that sounded like it would cost them a million pounds to make so they said this isn't, I dont know how this is going to work on stage, well actually what happened is...", with Fielding adding "We wrote it for Channel 4 originally...", and Barratt replying "[we spoke to them]...before we'd done a stage show and they said how is this going to work on TV cos it is ridiculous. So we wrote, we did a stage show and then they said hows that going to work on TV because its really good live, so, perhaps we should've done it inside a television set."

The first 8-part series was commissioned for BBC Three in May 2003 and was directed by Paul King and broadcast in 2004, with a second series of 6 episodes the next year. The second series moved away from the zoo setting to show Howard, Vince, Naboo the shaman and Bollo the talking ape living in a flat in Dalston. In 2006, the Boosh returned to theatre with The Mighty Boosh Live, which featured a new story entitled "The Ruby of Kukundu". In 2008 Fielding commented that "A film is the first thing we ever wanted to do, so we've always come up with ideas and stuck them in a drawer." and in 2014 it was commented that "The pair have written two film scripts in the past, though neither made it to production. One was a "Rocky Horror Picture Show type thing," according to Fielding, in which Barratt played a character who has woken up believing himself to be the last man on earth. The other was an Arctic adventure – 'because we always liked the Arctic'."

Fielding has commented in relation to touring that "The touring lifestyle is quite hard... ...In the boosh tour we did a 100 day tour and we had one day off a week to travel and we were playing arenas and we partied every single night and we got up for sound check at six o'clock. So we were like Dracula. I was like Dracula. So I'd wake up at six, do a sound check, wake up, do the show, go to a party, stay up till five in the morning, sleep all day, every day for a hundred... ." Fielding has further commented about the Mighty Boosh that "It was crazy cos we were just going.... ...it was never mean't to be, we were never mean't to be playing the O2 and Wembley and being on the cover of Time Out and... ...being on Jonathan Ross I dont think we ever thought that would happen... ...We always sort of just made it in our bedroom and then brought it out and stuff happened. We were as surprised as anyone when we won the Perrier and we were surprised when it got put on telly. We were like 'Wow this is great' we weren't ever sort of planning it. Like... ..we didn't even know if we could make a living from it." Fielding has commented further that “We always thought we’d make one show and that’d be the end of it. But after we won the Perrier, everyone was telling us that we had to do another, which we did and brought it to Melbourne... and then we made a radio show that won the Douglas Adams Award. We won loads. It was manic. We always thought we’d do a couple of years together and go our separate ways. We went from stages to the radio show to television to live shows. It went on and on.” Barratt has also commented that “Me and Noel went to HBO once and pitched this really ludicrous idea about us driving around in a haunted car and they just stared at us. Literally stared at us!... ...Luckily, we were together so we could laugh about it..."

In relation to a Mighty Boosh film Fielding commented in 2013 that "I would love to do a Boosh film I really would. I hope we do cos I feel like thats what we started out wanting to do. We really wanted to do a film, really,... ...we wanted to do a film, and then we thought alright we'll do a live show. We didn't really know how to do a live show we thought we'd just learn, and then we sort of... ...we did a radio show, we did a TV show, we never quite got around to doing a film..."

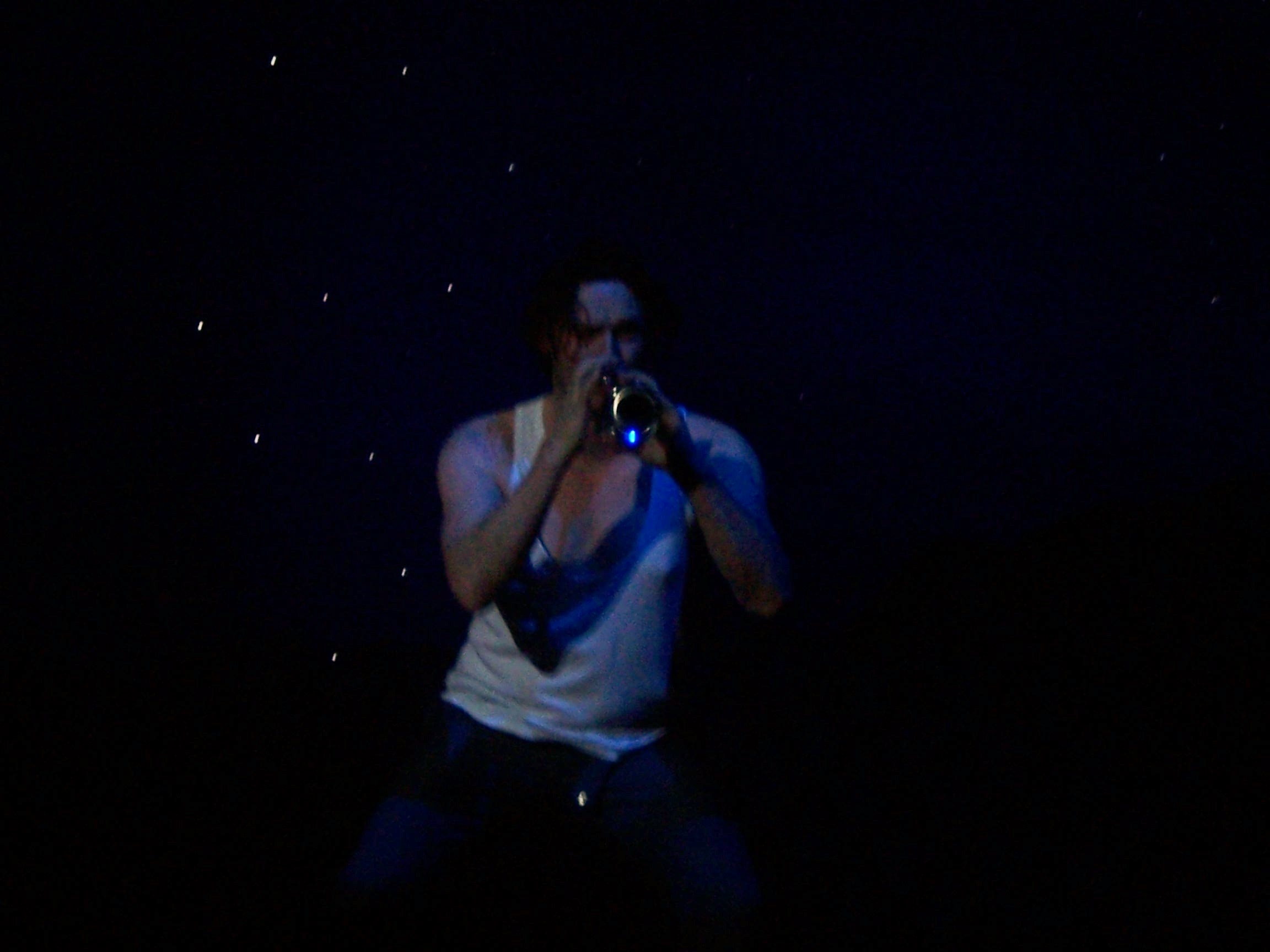
Howard Moon sending the audience into "...a jazz trance." at the Mighty Boosh Live stage show. Brighton Dome. February 2006

Fielding commented in 2015 that whilst creating Noel Fielding's Luxury Comedy that "Originally I used to do all the paintings for the animations. This meant that I was filming in the day and staying up until 5 am painting. After three weeks of this I started to feel unusual so Ivana Zorn, who is Nigel Coan's partner, now does a majority of the painting and I just design the main characters. Nigel animates everything like a futuristic goose." Fielding formed "Secret Peter Productions" with Nigel Coan who, along with Fielding and Zorn, helped to animate series 1 and 2 of the Mighty Boosh TV show, An evening with Noel Fielding and Noel Fielding's Luxury Comedy. Coan also directed Noel Fielding's Luxury Comedy as well as helping to write it along with Fielding. Dave Brown also contributed to graphics for the Mighty Boosh including the DVD cover art for the Mighty Boosh Live 2006 stage show. Brown also "...designed and compiled The Mighty Book of Boosh..." as well as all the publishing output for the Mighty Boosh. It has been commented that Barratt "...composed all the music for The Mighty Boosh." with Barratt also commenting that "I write the music, eh, but we both sort of write, we both write the lyrics, and we, I do the music mostly..." with Fielding replying to Barratt that "I have a go at the melodies then he goes away and makes it..." and then with Barratt replying "...tweaks, tweaks it a bit". Fielding also made drawings that formed a basis for the characters costumes and make-up in the Mighty boosh TV show. Regular Boosh collaborators include Michael Fielding, Rich Fulcher, Dave Brown, Nigel Coan, Richard Ayoade, Matt Berry and Ivanna Zorn. In 2002 during a live run through of a Mighty Boosh pilot Richard Ayoade played adventurer Dixon Bainbridge, but Matt Berry replaced him in the first television series, since Ayoade was under contract with Channel 4.

Fielding has further commented that "'I think our show is magical and fantastical. We tell very intricate, weird stories. Vince Noir is quite modern, a bit of an indie kid; Howard Moon is... ...eccentric... ...and we rely heavily on Julian's music and my animation... ...It's such a weird shambles of stuff.'" From August 2008 to January 2009 they went on tour for a second time with a new stage show of the Mighty Boosh.

After two years away from television, the Boosh returned in November 2007. Set in Naboo's second-hand shop below the flat, the third series drew approximately 1 million viewers with its first episode, and in light of its success, BBC Three broadcast an entire night of The Mighty Boosh on 22 March 2008, which included a new documentary and 6 of Barratt and Fielding's favourite episodes from all 3 series. J. G. Quintel has said that The Mighty Boosh was a large influence on his animated series Regular Show.

In June 2013, it was confirmed that The Mighty Boosh would reunite for a US festival called Festival Supreme in October 2013. Ahead of this appearance, they played their final UK show in the basement of Soho Theatre on 29th September.

On 1 January 2020, Fielding posted an image of himself and Barratt on Instagram with the caption, "There really wasn't enough Boosh this decade ! let's try and rectify that in the next one ;) x".

=== Main cast ===
- Julian Barratt as Howard Moon
- Noel Fielding as Vince Noir
- Michael Fielding as Naboo
- Dave Brown as Bollo
- Rich Fulcher as Bob Fossil

The cast members also play smaller roles throughout the series, the roles listed above are their most frequently appearing characters.

== Theatre ==
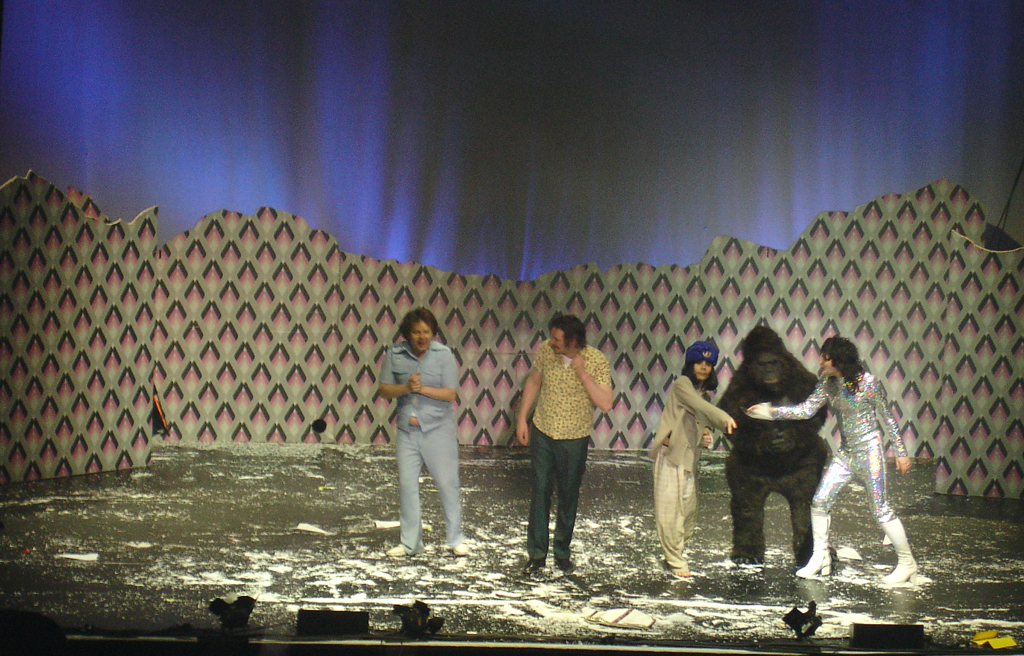
The Mighty Boosh Live stage show. From left to right: Rich Fulcher, Julian Barratt, Michael Fielding, Dave Brown and Noel Fielding. March 2006

=== Original stage shows ===
==== The Mighty Boosh (1998) ====
The Boosh, then consisting of only Barratt and Fielding, conceived The Mighty Boosh whilst working on Stewart Lee's Edinburgh Festival show King Dong vs. Moby Dick in which they played a giant penis and a whale respectively.

In 1998, they took The Mighty Boosh to the Edinburgh Festival, recruiting fellow comedian Rich Fulcher, whom the pair had met while working on Unnatural Acts. The show won the Perrier Award for Best Newcomer. During their residency at North London's Hen and Chickens Theatre the following year, they built up a cult following, introducing new characters whilst developing old ones.

==== Arctic Boosh (1999) ====
In 1999, the Boosh returned to the Edinburgh Festival with a new show, Arctic Boosh, with Dave Brown acting as choreographer and photographer, as well as playing a variety of characters. Arctic Boosh sold out every night and was nominated for the Perrier Award. The show was directed by Stewart Lee.

==== Autoboosh (2000) ====
In 2000, the Boosh premiered their third stage show, Autoboosh, at the Melbourne International Comedy Festival, adding Fielding's younger brother Michael to the cast and it won the Melbourne International Comedy Festival Award.

=== Nationwide tours ===
==== The Mighty Boosh Live (2006) ====
The Boosh returned to the stage in 2006, touring the UK for the first time. Though drawing heavily from their earlier material, the main story combined these elements into a new narrative. A recording of this show at the Brixton Academy was later released on DVD, before being broadcast on BBC Three on Boxing Day, 2007.

==== The Mighty Boosh Live: Future Sailors Tour (2008/09) ====
The Boosh toured the UK and Ireland for a second time from September 2008 to February 2009. The show featured characters from all three series as well as the Boosh Band.

They made appearances throughout the UK after their live shows, at after-parties held in different places in each city. The events were called "Outrage", after the catchphrase by Tony Harrison.

== Radio ==
=== The Boosh (2001) ===
From the success of Autoboosh, the BBC commissioned a six-part radio series for the Boosh. In October 2001 The Boosh radio series, produced by Danny Wallace, was broadcast on BBC London Live, then BBC Radio 4, and later on BBC 7. The show focuses on the adventures of a pair of zookeepers at "Bob Fossil's Funworld": socially awkward, jazz enthusiast Howard TJ Moon, and ultra-vain, fashion-obsessed Vince Noir. This also included voices from Lee Mack, playing such characters as the Plumber or the Gardener.

=== Further appearances ===
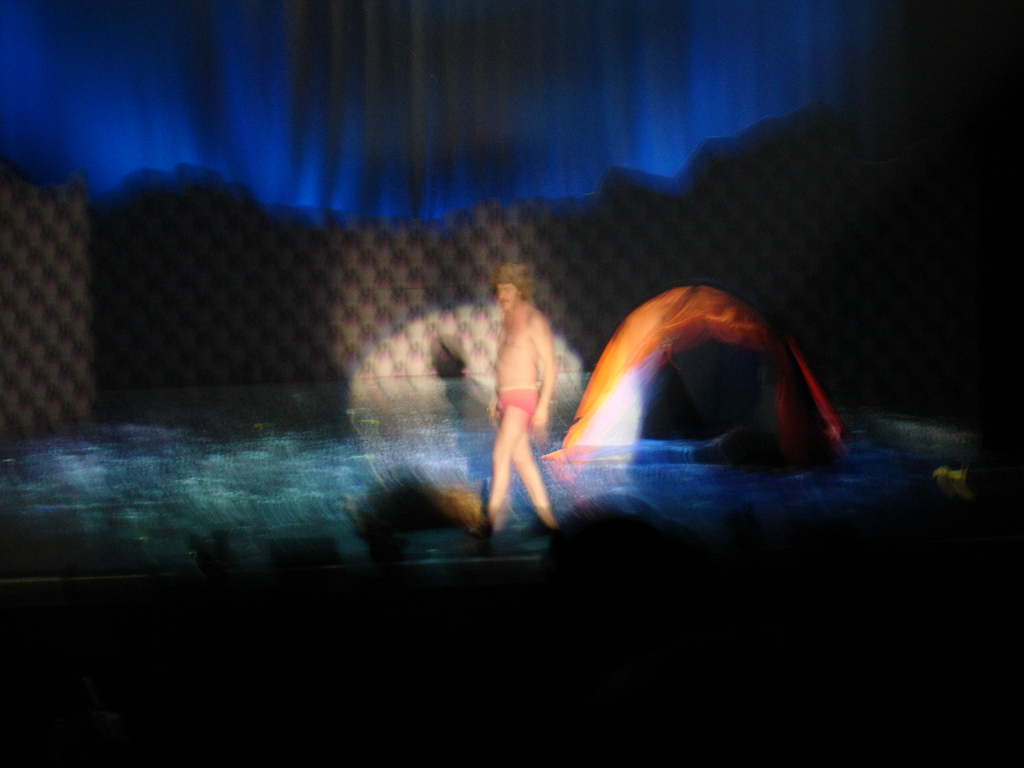
Julian Barratt as Howard Moon in the stageshow The Mighty Boosh Live. March 2006

The Mighty Boosh returned to radio on 22 October 2004, in a one-off comedy special for The Breezeblock, a show on BBC Radio 1. Instead of the plot driven nature of their own series, this show featured improvised conversational comedy with Barratt, Fielding and Fulcher, combined with the show's usual mix of electronic music.

On 15 November 2007, as part of the publicity for the premier of their third series the same day, Julian Barratt and Noel Fielding returned to Radio 1, this time on Jo Whiley's Live Lounge.

On 9 April 2019, it was announced that The Mighty Boosh will be the UK ambassadors for the Record Store Day at 13 April 2019, a show on BBC Radio 1.

== Television ==
=== The Mighty Boosh (2004–07) ===
After the success of the 2003 Mighty Boosh pilot Steve Coogan's company, Baby Cow Productions, produced the first television series of The Mighty Boosh for BBC Three which first aired in May 2004, before it moved to BBC Two in November that same year. Though each episode invariably starts and ends in Dixon Bainbridge's dilapidated zoo, the "Zooniverse", the characters of Vince and Howard often depart for other locations, such as the Arctic tundra and limbo.

A second series, shown in July 2005, saw Howard and Vince sharing Naboo's flat in Dalston with previously minor characters Naboo and his familiar, Bollo, a gorilla living at the "Zooniverse". This series had an even looser setting as the four characters leave the confines of the flat in every episode, travelling in their van to a variety of surrealistic environments, including Naboo's home planet "Xooberon".

Series three started in November 2007, still set in Dalston, but this time the foursome are selling 'Bits & Bobs' in their shop, the Nabootique. Their adventures and outings in this series focused more on the involvement of new characters (e.g. Sammy the Crab, or Lester Corncrake etc.) rather than just the two of them.

Although BBC America originally aired only series 1 in the U.S. (all episodes in their entirety), The Mighty Boosh began airing in North America on Cartoon Network's Adult Swim block (with up to 6 minutes cut from each episode), starting 29 March 2009 with the third series. In February 2016 series 1 of The Mighty Boosh was made available to watch via the online service BBC iPlayer for six weeks; this included every episode minus the final episode of the first series 'Hitcher'.

=== The Mighty Boosh Night ===
On 22 March 2008, BBC Three broadcast a whole night of The Mighty Boosh from 9:05 pm, starting with a new documentary titled The Mighty Boosh: A Journey Through Time and Space, documenting the history of the Boosh from their first amateur performances to their then-upcoming 2008 tour. This was followed by six of Barratt and Fielding's favourite episodes from the three series: "Party", "The Power of the Crimp", "The Nightmare of Milky Joe", "The Priest and the Beast", "The Legend of Old Gregg", and "Tundra". The pair also appeared in live links throughout the night, in a similar style to the openings of Series 1 episodes. On 23 December 2008, BBC3 held a Merry Booshmas Party featuring the entire series 3 as well as a broadcast of The Mighty Boosh Live.

== Film ==
On 8 February 2012, whilst sledging, Noel Fielding said that he and Barratt had discussed plans to make a Mighty Boosh film.

== Festival ==
On 5 July 2008, the Boosh held their own festival in the Hop Farm in Kent. It featured musical acts, Robots in Disguise, The Charlatans, The Kills, Gary Numan, and The Mighty Boosh Band, as well as comedy acts including Frankie Boyle, Josie Long and Ross Noble.

== Media ==
=== Audio CDs ===
Title	Release date	Contents	Bonus material
The Mighty Boosh	8 November 2004	All 6 episodes of the Boosh's radio series across 3 discs	Interview with producer Danny Wallace, outtakes
The Mighty Boosh Live	13 November 2006	Audio recording of their live show at Brixton Academy	N/A

According to an official MySpace page for PieFace Records (the fictitious music label mentioned throughout the series), Barratt and Fielding are to release an album of music from the show, "along with extras, versions, remixes and rare unreleased stuff all to be released later in the year on their own label—this one". In interviews since, The Mighty Boosh have confirmed they will be releasing an album of their music. On 21 October 2013 episode of Never Mind the Buzzcocks, Fielding stated that the Boosh have recorded an album, but don't know when it will be released.

=== DVDs ===
Title	UK Release date	US Release date	Contents	Special features
The Mighty Boosh	29 August 2005	21 July 2009	All 8 episodes of the first television series across 2 discs	Inside the Zooniverse, history of the Boosh, Boosh music, out-takes, picture gallery, commentary on "Bollo", "Tundra", "Electro" and "Hitcher"
The Mighty Boosh 2	13 February 2006	21 July 2009	All 6 episodes of the second series, plus a second disc of special features	Boosh pilot, Boosh publicity, making of Series Two, commentary on all six episodes, photo gallery, out-takes, deleted scenes, Sweet
The Mighty Boosh: Series One & Two	13 February 2006	n/a	Box set of first and second series DVDs, plus exclusive booklet	Identical to individual releases
The Mighty Boosh Live	13 November 2006	n/a	Recording of their live show at Brixton Academy	Backstage & tour documentary, the Ralfe Band, a deleted scene, The Culture Show piece
The Mighty Boosh 3	11 February 2008	21 July 2009	All 6 episodes of the third series across 2 discs	Making Boosh 3, Boosh publicity, deleted scenes, Mint Royale promo, Boosh music, out-takes, Boosh 3 trailer, audio commentaries
The Mighty Boosh Special Edition DVD	17 November 2008	13 October 2009	Box set of first three series DVDs, plus seventh disc	Identical to individual releases, plus stickers, postcards, 'A Journey Through Time and Space' documentary, behind the scenes of a live night, footage from the Royal Television Society Awards, Dave Stewart interview, the making of Sammy the Crab, outtakes and deleted scenes from the pilot, pre-recorded live night links, cinema trailer, crimping collection, Unnatural Acts zoo-keeper sketches, Bob Fossil audio
Boosh Live; Future Sailors Tour	9 November 2009	n/a	A DVD release of Boosh Live at the Manchester Apollo on 3 & 4 December 2008	Features the full show, commentary, audience participation option, Bob Fossil's Vietnam Video Diaries, highlights from The Mighty Boosh Festival and performances from the Teenage Cancer Trust concert at the Royal Albert Hall. Footage was filmed during the aftershow party that week at Club Academy, and members of the audience in costumes were filmed and photographed throughout the week, which may also add towards the additional features. There will also be a "Limited Edition".
Mighty Boosh On Tour: Journey Of The Childmen	15 November 2010	n/a	A documentary charting The Mighty Boosh on their Future Sailors tour.	n/a

Previously most of the DVDs were only released in Region 2 but as a result of a growing fan base in the U.S., the BBC rereleased in Region 1, Series 1–3 individually on 21 July 2009, and a Special Edition Series 1–3 Boxset on 13 October 2009.

=== Australian releases ===
- Series One – 11 April 2007
- Series Two – 12 April 2007
- Series Three – 6 August 2008
- Live – 3 December 2008
- Special Edition – 6 August 2009
- Future Sailors Tour – 10 November 2009
- Series One: Episodes 1–3 (Comedy Bites) – 4 March 2010

=== Books ===
On 18 September 2008, Canongate Books published The Mighty Book of Boosh, designed and compiled by Dave Brown and written by Noel Fielding, Julian Barratt, Rich Fulcher, Dave Brown, Richard Ayoade and Michael Fielding. The book includes original stories, crimps, concept art, behind-the-scenes photography, comics, and various other things, featuring old and new Mighty Boosh characters. On 1 October 2009, a paperback version was released under the name The Pocket Book of Boosh.

== Awards ==
Particularly popular among followers of the indie and electro music genres catered to by NME magazine, The Mighty Boosh has been recipient of the Shockwaves NME Awards Best TV Show for three consecutive years, even though there were no new episodes broadcast for the latter two of the three years.

Year	Award	Category	Nominee	Result
1998	Edinburgh Festival Fringe	Perrier Best Newcomer Award	Mighty Boosh	Won
1999	Edinburgh Festival Fringe	Perrier Comedy Award	Arctic Boosh	Nominated
2000	Melbourne International Comedy Festival	Melbourne International Comedy Festival Award	Autoboosh	Won
2001	Douglas Adams Award	Innovative Writing	The Boosh (radio series)	Won
2004	British Comedy Awards	Best New TV Comedy	Series 1	Nominated
2004	Loaded LAFTAS	Funniest TV Programme	Series 1	Nominated
2005	RTS Craft & Design Awards	Costume Design – Entertainment and Non Drama Productions	June Nevin; Series 2	Nominated
2005	BAFTA Television Awards	Best New Director (Fiction)	Paul King; Series 2	Nominated
2008	Alistair Baldwin Comedy Awards	Best Stage Show	The Mighty Boosh Live	Nominated
2006	Loaded LAFTAS	Funniest TV Programme	Series 2	Nominated
2006	Loaded LAFTAS	Funniest Double Act	Julian Barratt and Noel Fielding; Series 2	Nominated
2006	Loaded LAFTAS	Funniest DVD	Series 2	Nominated
2007	Chortle Awards	Best Full-Length Solo Show	The Mighty Boosh Live	Won
2007	Loaded LAFTAS	Funniest TV Programme	Series 3	Won
2007	Loaded LAFTAS	Funniest Double Act	Julian Barratt and Noel Fielding; Series 3	Nominated
2007	NME Awards	Best TV Show	Series 3	Won
2008	NME Awards	Best TV Show	Series 3	Won
2008	RTS Programme Awards	Situation Comedy and Comedy Drama	Series 3	Won
2009	NME Awards	Best TV Show	Series 3	Won
2010	NME Awards	Best DVD	Future Sailors	Won

== Controversy ==
In 2020, Netflix took The Mighty Boosh TV show, together with The League of Gentlemen, down from their program roster because of concerns about blackface in some episodes. As of 2025, all episodes of the TV show remain available via other streaming services including the BBC iPlayer and Apple TV+.
