= The Mighty Book of Boosh =

The Mighty Book of Boosh The Pocket Book of Boosh
- Cover of the hardback edition
- Author: Julian Barratt; Noel Fielding; Rich Fulcher; Dave Brown; Richard Ayoade; Michael Fielding
- Illustrator: Dave Brown
- Language: English
- Publisher: Canongate Books
- Publication date: 18 September 2008 (hardcover); 1 October 2009 (paperback)
- Publication place: United Kingdom
- Media type: Print (hardcover, paperback)
- Pages: 304
- ISBN: 978-1-84767-322-0 (hardcover); ISBN 978-1-84767-414-2 (paperback)

The Mighty Book of Boosh, known as The Pocket Book of Boosh in the paperback version, is a collection of original and archive material relating to The Mighty Boosh, published in 2008. The book contains original stories featuring popular Mighty Boosh characters, as well as concept art and behind-the-scenes photography from the stage shows and television series.

== Contents ==
The book consists of short stories and articles presented as contributed by various fictional characters from world of The Mighty Boosh. Also included are lyrics to all the crimps to feature in the television series, and a comic book written and illustrated by JAKe, the art designer for The Mighty Boosh's original television pilot. The Mighty Book of Boosh also includes character profiles and short stories linked to various episodes of the television series.

== Critical reception ==
The book gained a positive reception.

- 'If Salvador Dalí, Dr. Seuss and Douglas Adams had ever cracked open a bottle of absinthe and written a sitcom, it might have turned out like this.' (Radio Times)
- 'If there had ever been a collaboration between David Bowie, Anthony Burgess and Maurice Sendak, author of Where the Wild Things Are, it might have turned out something like this.' (The Observer)
- 'Morecambe and Wise reinvented by Lewis Carroll' (The Independent)
- 'Charming, audacious and genuinely innovative' (The Times)
- 'Julian, Noel and Dave (Bollo) Brown have created something quite special in this peculiar and magical lumber room of a book. Stories, comic strips and new insights into the Boosh world make this a must-have for any devotee.' (Time Out)
