= The Mighty Boosh Live: Future Sailors Tour =

2008–2009 tour by The Mighty Boosh

Future Sailors Tour
- Comedy tour by The Mighty Boosh
- DVD cover
- Location: United Kingdom; Republic of Ireland
- Start date: 11 September 2008
- End date: 17 January 2009
- No. of shows: 91

The Mighty Boosh concert chronology
- The Mighty Boosh (2006); Boosh Live (2008–2009)

The Mighty Boosh Live: Future Sailors Tour was a stage-show written and performed by Noel Fielding and Julian Barratt, also known as The Mighty Boosh. Michael Fielding, Rich Fulcher and Dave Brown also performed in the show, along with the Boosh Band.

The show toured the UK and Ireland from September 2008 through to January 2009.

== Act I ==
The show begins with Vince Noir (Fielding) and Howard Moon (Barratt) performing "Future Sailors" – Noir entering the stage in a large pirate ship, Moon following in a rubber dinghy. The first act of the show features a series of sketches starring a number of different characters. Bob Fossil (Fulcher) is introduced, and guides the audience through a series of moves from his Dance Academy. Naboo (M. Fielding) and Bollo (Brown) follow this, Naboo now a gangsta rapper in Los Angeles, and Bollo shows off his latest invention – the frisbee clock.

After this, The Moon makes his first appearance; Tony Harrison introduces his own chat-show themed 'nugget' of the show, including a set from a Lithuanian taxi-driver turned stand-up comic Kraków (Fulcher), and The Crack Fox tells a cautionary tale about a party lifestyle and subsequent drug use. When he leaves, The Hitcher is introduced, leading the Boosh Band on a performance of Eels.

== Act II ==
The second act of the show revolves around a play written by Howard Moon about the end of the world, entitled No Future? Moon has enlisted the help of Naboo, Fossil, Bollo and Vince to perform the play, but Noir is quick to point out its ridiculous content, and hijacks the play by blackmailing Howard about a jazz-porn photo shoot he mistakenly got roped into.

At Vince's insistence, the cast (now with Brown out of the Bollo costume again) perform his play about aliens from the planet Camden. Vince plays Sunflash (who speaks with a Chinese/Chav accent, which Vince believes people will speak in the future) and Fossil as Booblay (a future pleasure-robot). Sunflash transforms the mutants from Moon's play into beautiful versions of themselves, thanks to his sponsor Jean-Claude Jacquetti. The increasingly humiliated Howard is made to wear a silver corset and blonde pigtails, and together with Dave Brown's Mutant character, performs the Mutants song from the first series.

Moon tries to halt the play and leave the theatre, but is lured back in with a crimp. The Boosh Band reappears and together with Vince, Howard, Naboo, Bollo and Bob Fossil, they perform a medley of crimps from the series. During this, the Honey Monster appears, and the gang use Vince's giant Jean-Claude Jacquetti hairdryer to decapitate him and stick his head on a spike: a reference to a Sugar Puffs advertisement which they believed had plagiarised their 'crimping' style earlier that year. The band perform the song "Nanageddon" to end the show, sometimes followed by performances of "I Did A Shit on Your Mum" and "Charlie".

== Early versions and changes ==
The previews and early performances were introduced by stage manager Bob Fossil, who would run through a series of safety features with the audience, before the "Future Sailors" number, but this was soon dropped. Over time, many sections become elongated – during the November shows, Bollo's frisbee clock joke was built upon greatly, for example.

Some parts of the show were dropped altogether – previews included prototype versions of The Crack Fox sketches, but were replaced on the early tour dates by a sequence involving Rudi, who would then join The Hitcher during the performance of Eels. Also, early performances featured the Bingo Caller from Nanageddon instead of Eleanor.

For the DVD recording nights at Manchester Apollo on 3 and 4 December, The Moon's reworking of the Jay-Z track, 99 Problems, was removed due to copyright clearance, but it has been performed on almost every other night of the tour (apart from one of the early Glasgow shows where the Moon did not appear due to technical issues), including the other shows that week. Eleanor also switched from throwing her usual ballpit-style balls into the audience during the bingo section, instead throwing and kicking giant, numbered, inflatable balls into the crowds – on the DVD filming nights, these were also signed by the cast.

Some sections change simply because of either audience participation, or due to mistakes on the night. Bollo tripping over the globe, for example, was added after Dave Brown slipped several times in early October, and by the end of the month it was a regular part of the performance. Similarly, Tony Harrison slipping in his chair, and the following dialogue, was added after Noel Fielding found it increasingly difficult to stay upright in such an enclosed space.

There have been rare performances of Love Games from The Legend of Old Gregg during the final band set.

== DVD ==
Boosh Live: Future Sailors Tour was released on DVD on 16 November 2009 with special and limited edition copies of the DVD being made available at the same time. Recorded at the Manchester Apollo on 3 and 4 December, the DVD features the full show with commentary. The Special and Limited Editions also contain a bonus disc with backstage clips and scenes from Journey of the Childmen, a documentary about the Future Sailors Tour. Journey of the Childmen was shown at film festivals and received a full DVD release in 2010.

The 'Normal Edition' includes the 2008–9 Live Show. The 'Special Edition' includes the 2008–9 Live Show, the 2006 Live Show, and a set of Boosh Outrage playing cards in the style of Top Trumps.

The 'Limited Edition' includes the 2008–9 Live Show, the 2006 Live Show, a set of Boosh playing cards, and a Boosh belt buckle.

== Tour dates ==
Date	City	Country	Venue
Europe
20 August 2008	London	England	Riverside Studios
21 August 2008	London	England	Riverside Studios
1 September 2008	London	England	Riverside Studios
11 September 2008	Edinburgh	Scotland	Edinburgh Festival Theatre
12 September 2008	Edinburgh	Scotland	Edinburgh Festival Theatre
13 September 2008	Glasgow	Scotland	Pavilion Theatre
14 September 2008	Glasgow	Scotland	Pavilion Theatre
16 September 2008	Dublin	Ireland	Olympia Theatre
17 September 2008	Dublin	Ireland	Olympia Theatre
18 September 2008	Dublin	Ireland	Olympia Theatre
19 September 2008	Dublin	Ireland	Olympia Theatre
20 September 2008	Dublin	Ireland	Olympia Theatre
22 September 2008	York	England	Grand Opera House
23 September 2008	York	England	Grand Opera House
24 September 2008	York	England	Grand Opera House
25 September 2008	York	England	Grand Opera House
26 September 2008	Harrogate	England	Harrogate Theatre
27 September 2008	Harrogate	England	Harrogate Theatre
29 September 2008	Huddersfield	England	Lawrence Batley Theatre
30 September 2008	Huddersfield	England	Lawrence Batley Theatre
1 October 2008	Buxton	England	Buxton Opera House
2 October 2008	Buxton	England	Buxton Opera House
3 October 2008	Wakefield	England	Theatre Royal
4 October 2008	Wakefield	England	Theatre Royal
6 October 2008	Sheffield	England	Sheffield City Hall
7 October 2008	Sheffield	England	Sheffield City Hall
8 October 2008	Sheffield	England	Sheffield City Hall
9 October 2008	Sheffield	England	Sheffield City Hall
10 October 2008	Sheffield	England	Sheffield City Hall
11 October 2008	Sheffield	England	Sheffield City Hall
14 October 2008	Liverpool	England	Echo Arena Liverpool
15 October 2008	Liverpool	England	Echo Arena Liverpool
16 October 2008	Blackpool	England	Opera House Theatre
17 October 2008	Blackpool	England	Opera House Theatre
18 October 2008	Cardiff	Wales	Cardiff International Arena
20 October 2008	London	England	O_{2} Academy, Brixton
21 October 2008	London	England	O_{2} Academy, Brixton
22 October 2008	London	England	O_{2} Academy, Brixton
23 October 2008	London	England	O_{2} Academy, Brixton
24 October 2008	London	England	O_{2} Academy, Brixton
25 October 2008	London	England	O_{2} Academy, Brixton
27 October 2008	Bristol	England	Bristol Hippodrome
28 October 2008	Bristol	England	Bristol Hippodrome
29 October 2008	Bristol	England	Bristol Hippodrome
30 October 2008	Bristol	England	Bristol Hippodrome
31 October 2008	Birmingham	England	NIA Academy
1 November 2008	Birmingham	England	NIA Academy
3 November 2008	Oxford	England	New Theatre Oxford
4 November 2008	Oxford	England	New Theatre Oxford
5 November 2008	Wolverhampton	England	Wolverhampton Civic Hall
6 November 2008	Wolverhampton	England	Wolverhampton Civic Hall
7 November 2008	Nottingham	England	Trent FM Arena Nottingham
8 November 2008	Nottingham	England	Trent FM Arena Nottingham
10 November 2008	Portsmouth	England	Portsmouth Guildhall
11 November 2008	Portsmouth	England	Portsmouth Guildhall
12 November 2008	Brighton	England	Brighton Centre
13 November 2008	Brighton	England	Brighton Centre
14 November 2008	Brighton	England	Brighton Centre
15 November 2008	Brighton	England	Brighton Centre
17 November 2008	Plymouth	England	Plymouth Pavilions
18 November 2008	Plymouth	England	Plymouth Pavilions
19 November 2008	Bournemouth	England	Windsor Hall
21 November 2008	Bournemouth	England	Windsor Hall
22 November 2008	Bournemouth	England	Windsor Hall
24 November 2008	Cardiff	Wales	Cardiff International Arena
25 November 2008	Cardiff	Wales	Cardiff International Arena
26 November 2008	Newcastle	England	Telewest Arena
27 November 2008	Newcastle	England	Telewest Arena
28 November 2008	Glasgow	Scotland	Clyde Auditorium
29 November 2008	Glasgow	Scotland	Clyde Auditorium
1 December 2008	Manchester	England	O_{2} Apollo Manchester
2 December 2008	Manchester	England	O_{2} Apollo Manchester
3 December 2008	Manchester	England	O_{2} Apollo Manchester
4 December 2008	Manchester	England	O_{2} Apollo Manchester
5 December 2008	Manchester	England	Manchester Evening News Arena
6 December 2008	Manchester	England	Manchester Evening News Arena
8 December 2008	Leeds	England	Grand Theatre
9 December 2008	Leeds	England	Grand Theatre
10 December 2008	Leeds	England	Grand Theatre
11 December 2008	Leeds	England	Grand Theatre
12 December 2008	London	England	Wembley Arena
13 December 2008	Brighton	England	Brighton Centre
15 December 2008	London	England	Wembley Arena
17 December 2008	London	England	The O_{2} Arena
18 December 2008	London	England	The O_{2} Arena
22 December 2008	Birmingham	England	National Indoor Arena
23 December 2008	Manchester	England	Manchester Evening News Arena
4 January 2009	Belfast	Northern Ireland	Odyssey Arena
5 January 2009	Dublin	Ireland	The O_{2}
7 January 2009	Sheffield	England	Sheffield Arena
9 January 2009	Nottingham	England	Trent FM Arena Nottingham
10 January 2009	Nottingham	England	Trent FM Arena Nottingham
14 January 2009	Glasgow	Scotland	Scottish Exhibition and Conference Centre
15 January 2009	Glasgow	Scotland	Scottish Exhibition and Conference Centre
16 January 2009	Aberdeen	Scotland	Press & Journal Arena
17 January 2009	Aberdeen	Scotland	Press & Journal Arena
