= Arctic Boosh =

1999 stage show

Promotional poster for the 1999 show

Arctic Boosh was a 1999 stage show written and performed by Noel Fielding and Julian Barratt, along with Rich Fulcher. It was the second incarnation of what would eventually become The Mighty Boosh. It was directed by Stewart Lee.

== Overview ==
In 1999, after having a residency at The Hen and Chickens Theatre in Islington, London, Noel Fielding, Julian Barratt and Rich Fulcher returned to the Edinburgh Festival with a new show, Arctic Boosh, which sold out every night and was nominated for the Perrier Award.

Instead of featuring zookeepers like in The Mighty Boosh (1998 stage show), the show featured Noel and Julian playing postmen. The plot of the show was loosely based around what would become the "Tundra" episode of The Mighty Boosh (TV series).

This was the first time Dave Brown worked on a Boosh show playing a variety of characters, as well as acting as choreographer and photographer.
