= Unnatural Acts (TV series) =

- Also known as: (Un)natural Acts
- Genre: Sketch comedy
- Starring: Julian Barratt; Seán Cullen; Rich Easter; Noel Fielding; Rich Fulcher; Jessica Hynes; Mark Caven
- Theme music composer: Julian Barratt
- Country of origin: United Kingdom
- Original language: English
- No. of seasons: 1
- No. of episodes: 6

Production
- Producer: Gary Reich
- Running time: 25 minutes

Original release
- Network: Paramount Comedy
- Release: 1998

Related
- The Mighty Boosh

Unnatural Acts (also spelt (Un)natural Acts) is a British sketch comedy series featuring comedians Julian Barratt and Noel Fielding. It was first broadcast in 1998 on the Paramount Comedy Channel, now known as Comedy Central. Other stars included Seán Cullen, Rich Easter, and Rich Fulcher.

== Recurring sketches ==
=== The Zookeepers ===
One of the recurring sketches shows Julian Barratt and Noel Fielding as zookeepers, having the same kind of wordy, bragging discussions that later became an integral part of The Mighty Boosh. Some of the topics from Unnatural Acts were kept in The Mighty Boosh, e.g. "don’t touch me", "never tremble with a newt" and "his eyes are like black holes", as well as the many threats of the nature "I'll come through your flesh like soft cheese", "I'll take your arms off gently, it will tickle, but then I'll punch your stumps" or "I'll get forty trained grasshoppers to kick your eyes out and replace them with wheat. You’ll be known as 'wheat eyes'".

The zookeepers are called Alan and George, but there are mentions of a person called Bob Fossil. Parts of Bob Fossil's traits in The Mighty Boosh can be spotted in some of Rich Fulcher's characters in Unnatural Acts.

=== Street vendor ===
Another recurring sketch is a distinctively northern English crazy street vendor (Julian Barratt) who attempts to sell such things as chicken puppets, earrings and batman capes.

=== Gay policemen ===
Another recurring sketch is two policemen who instead of focusing on the job flirt and/or have little relationship fights with each other.

=== The Lighthouse ===
An old man and a little boy get up to shenanigans in a lighthouse, such as playing hide-and-seek or opening the refrigerator door repeatedly. The "wind" joke from the Mighty Boosh series one episode "Charlie" originated in this sketch.

=== "It's too hard." ===
A husband (Julian Barratt) and wife attempt to do simple things (read a bus schedule, play Monopoly) but are hindered by their farsighted inability to read anything, and quickly give up, often muttering, "It's too hard."

== Connections with The Mighty Boosh ==
- The recurring Alan and George characters are played by Julian Barratt and Noel Fielding and work in a zoo, much like Howard Moon and Vince Noir.
- Alan and George mention a zookeeper called Bob Fossil.
- A character played by Rich Fulcher is referred to as 'Bob' and another as 'Robert'.
- An alien creature played by Rich Fulcher resembles Tommy Nookah.
- A tramp played by Julian Barratt is shown selling Batman capes. The Mighty Book of Boosh and Boosh Live reference Howard as previously being a tramp who sold Batman capes.
- The lighthouse keeper searches for the source of a wind blowing, which turns out to be his young child companion. Vince performs a similar trick on Howard in Charlie.
- In a conference, Julian Barratt refers to eels. Similarly, Mighty Boosh has an episode and song titled 'Eels'.
