= The Mighty Boosh (1998 stage show) =

1998 Stage Show

Promotional poster for the 1998 show

The Mighty Boosh was a 1998 stage show written and performed by Noel Fielding and Julian Barratt, along with Rich Fulcher. It was one of the first incarnations of what eventually became The Mighty Boosh.

== Overview ==
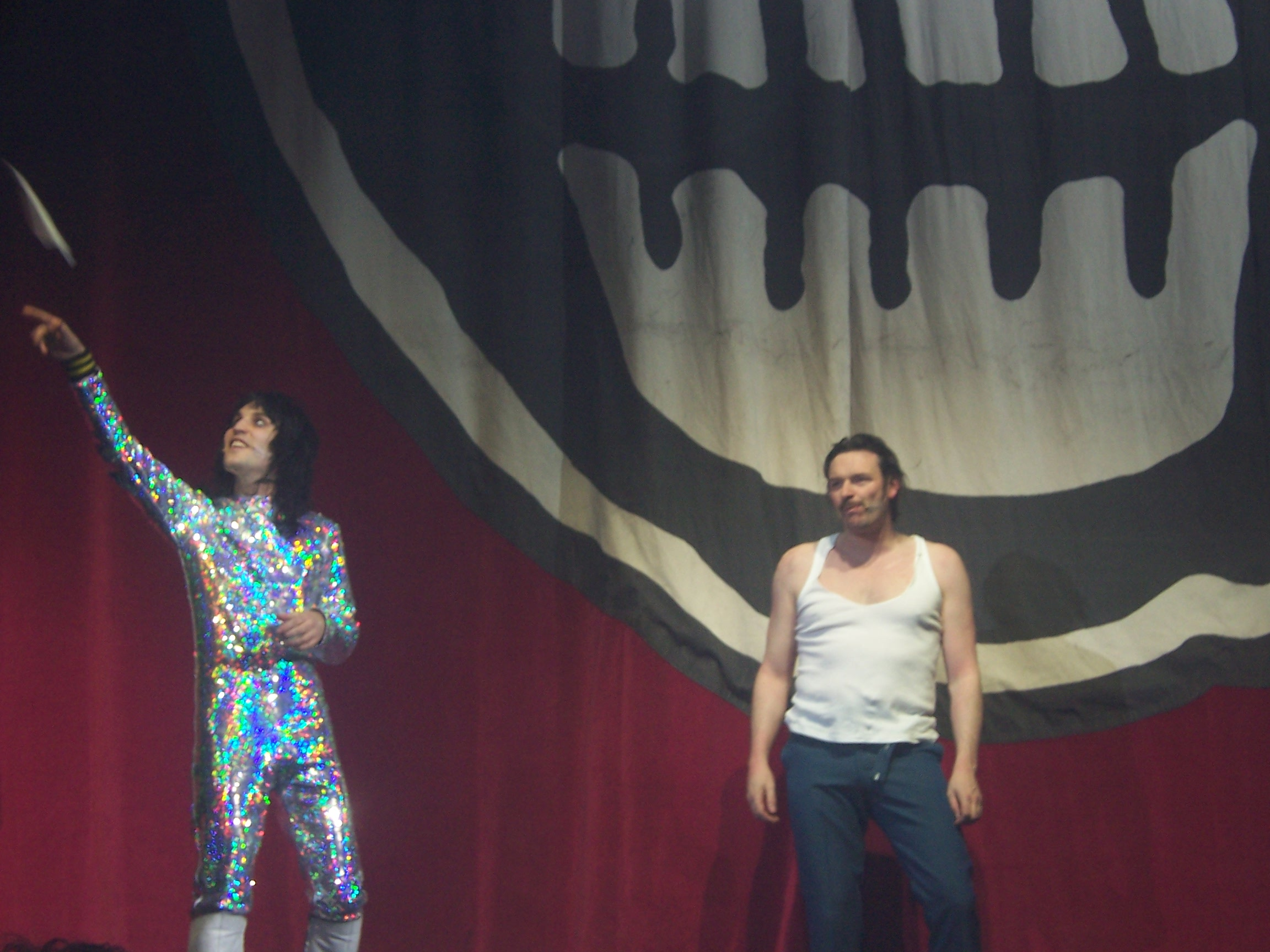
Noel Fielding and Julian Barratt as Vince Noir and Howard Moon in the 2006 stageshow The Mighty Boosh Live at the Brighton Dome.

Fielding and Barratt first conceived of The Mighty Boosh whilst working on Stewart Lee's Edinburgh show, King Dong vs. Moby Dick, in which they played a giant penis and a whale respectively.

They then put on the first show that they had made together and it was commented by Nigel Coan with whom they collaborated on Mighty Boosh that "They did their first gig at Oranje Boom Boom which is sort of in Chinatown in London, and ah, which was ridiculous, I mean it was really, like, ridiculous costumes and um, they didn't know what... they really [didn't] know what they were doing... It was very raw, but it was, it was hilarious... They thought let's do a show, an Edinburgh show. I think they started to think about doing that. So they got a gig at Hen and Chickens...". Dave Brown who also collaborated on the Mighty Boosh with them commented further on their time at the Hen and Chickens which is a theatre bar in Islington, London, "They would use the Hen and Chickens as this kind of... place to, a platform to just try stuff out and it was just a great little place they could do a regular spot... where they would probably write and have ideas in the week, try stuff out for half of that and then for the rest of it, it would just be improv and mucking about. Then they took the, um, took The Mighty Boosh up to Edinburgh and then two more shows Arctic Boosh (1999), Autoboosh (2000)...".

Whilst Fielding and Barratt were being interviewed together, Fielding commented on their time at Hen and Chickens "...'cos it'd be stand up and people would come on and do straight stand up. And then we used to put potted plants all around the gig and music on... to try and make it into a sort of play... People couldn't believe the audacity. It got some sort of reputation as being sort of enigmatic but we're just really unprofessional. We didn't know anything about theatre or what you did." with Barratt responding to Fielding, "Speak for yourself, I was in a Sartre play at university I'll have you know. Huis Clos." Fielding has commented further on the 1998 Mighty Boosh live show “Julian had a song about a mammoth that he wanted to sing to a girl in the audience, and I had a few ideas for some weird sketches... We started working on our ideas together... We were zookeepers and we got sucked through our bosses’ eyes and into a magic forest..."

After recruiting fellow comedian Rich Fulcher (whom the pair had met working on a television series called Unnatural Acts), the trio decided to take the show to the Edinburgh Festival Fringe, where they won the Perrier Best Newcomer Award.
