= The Mighty Boosh (TV series) =

British television comedy series

- Genre: Surreal comedy
- Created by: Julian Barratt; Noel Fielding
- Written by: Julian Barratt; Noel Fielding; Rich Fulcher
- Directed by: Paul King
- Starring: Julian Barratt; Noel Fielding; Michael Fielding; Rich Fulcher; Dave Brown; Matt Berry; Richard Ayoade
- Theme music composer: Julian Barratt
- Country of origin: United Kingdom
- Original language: English
- No. of series: 3
- No. of episodes: 20

Production
- Executive producers: Steve Coogan; Mark Freeland; Henry Normal; Lindsay Hughes
- Producers: Spencer Millman; Alison MacPhail
- Production location: 3 Mills Studios
- Camera setup: Single camera
- Running time: 28–30 minutes
- Production company: Baby Cow Productions

Original release
- Network: BBC Three
- Release: 18 May 2004 – 20 December 2007

Related
- Noel Fielding's Luxury Comedy

The Mighty Boosh is a British surreal comedy television series written by Julian Barratt and Noel Fielding, originally broadcast on BBC Three from 2004 to 2007. Three series totalling twenty episodes were made. Set in a surreal universe, the series follows the adventures of Howard Moon (Barratt) and Vince Noir (Fielding), two eccentric and failing musicians. The pair are joined by a supporting cast of characters—shaman Naboo the Enigma (Michael Fielding), zookeeper Bob Fossil (Rich Fulcher) and Bollo the Gorilla (Dave Brown), who comprised The Mighty Boosh as a comedy group. They navigate the bizarre situations around them with elaborate musical numbers in different genres and an array of creatures. It also features animated sequences, puppets and special effects.

While beginning as a niche stage and radio act, The Mighty Boosh rapidly gained a cult following, and eventually won the Shockwaves NME Award for Best TV Show in both 2007 and 2009. Its surreal innovation earned it the 31st spot on Rotten Tomatoes' list of the 200 Best Comedy Series of All Time. In 2019, the show was ranked 98th on The Guardian's list of the 100 best TV shows of the 21st century. It has been noted for its impact on mid-2000s popular culture and alternative humour.

== Production ==
Before its television debut, The Mighty Boosh was developed from a trio of stage shows performed by Julian Barratt and Noel Fielding: The Mighty Boosh (1998), Arctic Boosh (1999), and Autoboosh (2000).

The success of the stage shows led to The Boosh, a six-part BBC Radio 4 series, which aired in October and November 2001.

Steve Coogan, who had seen their live performances, spent £40,000 on pilot episode for the series through his production company, Baby Cow Productions. The pilot was directed by Steve Bendelack and filmed in front of a live studio audience at Pinewood Studios in May 2003.

The BBC then commissioned the first series, with rehearsals taking place later that year and filming commencing at Three Mills Studios in January 2004. It was directed by Paul King and produced by Baby Cow Productions.

== Plot ==
The Mighty Boosh follows the surreal adventures of two eccentric, failing musicians: Howard Moon and Vince Noir. The series changes its primary setting with each series: a dilapidated London zoo called the "Zooniverse" in Series 1, a flat in Dalston in Series 2, and a second-hand shop named the "Nabootique" in Series 3.

Despite these shifts, the narrative relies on the contrasting personas of the central duo to drive the plot. Howard is portrayed as a socially awkward, jazz-obsessed intellectual who aspires to be a serious artist, while Vince is a carefree, fashion-centric narcissist who succeeds with little effort. Other characters include: mystical alien shaman Naboo the Enigma, Bollo the Gorilla, and deranged and inept zoo manager Bob Fossil.

Episodes typically begin with a mundane domestic or workplace conflict which escalates into a fantastical journey. To resolve these conflicts, the characters frequently travel to surreal locations such as the Arctic Tundra, the "Black Lake," or "Planet Xooberon". These sequences mainly use painted backdrops, puppetry, and practical effects, which is supplemented by computer-generated imagery. The narrative is often interrupted by musical numbers in various genres, most notably "crimping"—short, a cappella songs involving scat singing, lyrically characterised by non-sequiturs that are rhythmically similar to beatboxing, which became a signature element of the show's format.

Unlike the radio series, the characters in the TV series all seem aware that they are part of a TV show, and Vince especially will often break the fourth wall to address the audience and comment on the situation. The series maintains a loose continuity, often disregarding the consequences of previous episodes. Characters who die or suffer major injuries, such as Bollo and the belligerent shaman Saboo, often return in subsequent episodes without explanation. This allows for the introduction of bizarre supporting characters played by the core cast, including the "Hitcher", a green cockney bogeyman, and "Old Gregg", a hermaphroditic merman ("Some say he’s half man half fish, others say it’s a 70:30 mix of the two. Whatever the percentage, he’s one fishy bastard.”), who serve as antagonists.

== Characters ==
=== Main characters ===
Though there are many recurring characters, the "central cast" consists of five characters:

- Howard Moon (Julian Barratt)
- Vince Noir (Noel Fielding)
- Naboo (Michael Fielding)
- Bollo (Dave Brown)
- Bob Fossil (Rich Fulcher)

Recurring characters include:

- Dennis (Julian Barratt)
- Dixon Bainbridge (Matt Berry)
- The Hitcher (Noel Fielding)
- Kirk (Kirk Gaitskell-Kendrick)
- Lester Corncrake (Rich Fulcher)
- The Moon (Noel Fielding)
- Old Gregg (Noel Fielding)
- Rudi van DiSarzio (Julian Barratt)
- Saboo (Richard Ayoade)
- Tony Harrison (Noel Fielding)

Notable guest actors and actresses include:

- Dee Plume and Sue Denim ("Mutants", "Electro", "Nanageddon", "The Strange Tale of the Crack Fox")
- Gary Numan ("The Power of the Crimp")
- The Horrors ("The Chokes")
- Razorlight and Roger Daltrey ("The Priest and the Beast")
- Diva Zappa ("Party")

== Reception ==
=== Critical reaction ===
==== Contemporary ====
Upon its television debut in 2004, The Mighty Boosh was identified by critics as a "comedy revolution," distinguished by its rejection of the prevailing realist sitcom trend—archetyped by The Office—in favour of "neon-soaked surrealism" and a "lo-fi, DIY aesthetic". Reviewers praised the show's "unmatched combination of imagination," noting that while the surrealism was its calling card, the series was grounded by the "warm" and "odd-couple" chemistry between Howard Moon and Vince Noir. The series led to the emergence of cult following often termed "Booshmania," particularly among the youth and "nu-rave" subcultures of the mid-2000s, although the BBC cut the budget for the third series, which resulted in the show receiving criticism over its perceived declining quality.

==== Retrospective ====
The show is regarded as a landmark in British television comedy, frequently cited as a "comedy revolution" that defined the "NME generation". However, Emma Garland of Vice described the show as moving from "supremely cool to supremely uncool" within the space of five years, as the specific cultural moment it satirised and celebrated evolved. Despite this, it has maintained a strong critical rating over time, holding an 8.4/10 on IMDb and a 100% Tomatometer score on Rotten Tomatoes.

In recent years, the show has faced scrutiny regarding its use of blackface; in 2020, Netflix removed the series from its platform over a character called "The Spirit of Jazz" in an episode titled Electro. Comedian Jack Carroll criticised the removal as "an arbitrary gesture that means [Netflix] doesn’t have to put any real work into combatting actual instances of racial discrimination." The series was kept on BBC iPlayer but a content warning was added before each episode.

==== Awards and legacy ====
The show's unique style was recognised early on when it received the Douglas Adams Award for innovative comedy writing. Following its television launch, it was nominated for Best Comedy Newcomer at the 2004 British Comedy Awards. At the Shockwaves NME Awards it won the Best TV Show award for three consecutive years from 2007 to 2009.

== Episodes ==
=== Series overview ===
Series	Episodes	Originally released	
Series	Episodes	First released	Last released
1	8	18 May 2004	6 July 2004
2	6	26 July 2005	30 August 2005
3	6	15 November 2007	20 December 2007

=== Series 1 (2004) ===
No. overall	No. in series	Title	Directed by	Original release date
1	1	"Killeroo"	Paul King	18 May 2004
2	2	"Mutants"	Paul King	25 May 2004
3	3	"Bollo"	Paul King	1 June 2004
4	4	"Tundra"	Paul King & Steve Bendelack	8 June 2004
5	5	"Jungle"	Paul King	15 June 2004
6	6	"Charlie"	Paul King	22 June 2004
7	7	"Electro"	Paul King	29 June 2004
8	8	"Hitcher"	Paul King	6 July 2004

=== Series 2 (2005) ===
No. overall	No. in series	Title	Directed by	Original release date
9	1	"Call of the Yeti"	Paul King	26 July 2005
10	2	"The Priest and the Beast"	Paul King	2 August 2005
11	3	"Nanageddon"	Paul King	9 August 2005
12	4	"Fountain of Youth"	Paul King	16 August 2005
13	5	"The Legend of Old Gregg"	Paul King	23 August 2005
14	6	"The Nightmare of Milky Joe"	Paul King	30 August 2005

=== Series 3 (2007) ===
No. overall	No. in series	Title	Directed by	Original release date
15	1	"Eels"	Paul King	15 November 2007
16	2	"Journey to the Centre of the Punk"	Paul King	22 November 2007
17	3	"The (Power of the) Crimp"	Paul King	29 November 2007
18	4	"The Strange Tale of the Crack Fox"	Paul King	6 December 2007
19	5	"Party"	Paul King	13 December 2007
20	6	"The Chokes"	Paul King	20 December 2007

== Home media ==
=== DVD releases ===
In the United Kingdom, the Mighty Boosh has been fully released on DVD both individually and in boxsets: Series 1 was released on in August 2005, Series 2 in February 2006 and Series 3 was released in February 2008.

As a result of a growing fan base in the United States, the BBC released seasons 1–3 individually on North American NTSC-formatted DVDs on 21 July 2009. The North American series 1–3 boxset was released on 13 October 2009.

DVD Title	No. of discs	Year	No. of episodes	DVD release		
DVD Title	No. of discs	Year	No. of episodes	Region 1	Region 2	Region 4
Complete Series 1	2	2004	8	21 July 2009	29 August 2005	11 April 2007
Complete Series 2	2	2005	6	21 July 2009	13 February 2006	12 April 2007
Complete Series 3	2	2007	6	21 July 2009	11 February 2008	6 August 2008
Complete Series 1 & 2	4	2004–2005	14	—	13 February 2006	—
Complete Series 1–3 (Special Edition)	7	2004–2007	20	13 October 2009	17 November 2008	6 August 2009
Complete Series 1–3 (HMV Edition)	6	2004–2007	20	—	17 November 2008	—

== Sources ==
- Hunt, Leon (2015). "The 'Zooniverse' and other (furnished) comic worlds". Cult British TV Comedy. Manchester University Press. pp. 147–164. ISBN 978-0719089220.
- Brown, Dave (8 October 2024). "'Noel and Julian were possibly aroused': The Mighty Boosh turns 20 – in pictures". The Guardian.
