= The Mighty Boosh series 3 =

The Mighty Boosh
- Season 3
- DVD cover art
- No. of episodes: 6

Release
- Original network: BBC Three
- Original release: 15 November – 20 December 2007

Series chronology
- ← Previous; Series 2

The Mighty Boosh's third series was originally broadcast between 15 November 2007 and 20 December 2007. The series features five main cast members; Julian Barratt, Noel Fielding, Rich Fulcher, Michael Fielding and Dave Brown. The third series revolves around Howard Moon and Vince Noir (Julian Barratt and Noel Fielding), and the adventures they have whilst running a second-hand shop. A DVD of the series was released on 11 February 2008 in Region 2 and 7 August in Region 4.

== Overview ==
=== Setting ===
Whereas the second series was set mainly in a flat in Dalston, England, the third series was set in a second hand shop below the flat called the Nabootique, owned by Naboo, and run by Howard Moon and Vince Noir. The flat, however, is re-used for most of the setting of the episode "Party".

=== Production ===
Series 3 had the smallest budget of all three series to date. Filming for the series took place in seven weeks, from July to September 2007, in a warehouse in a disused Ministry of Defence site in Surrey, England. The reason the show was on a two-year break was because there was a 55 performance live tour happening in 2006.

=== Reception ===
The first episode, "Eels", attracted 1 million viewers, making it the most-watched programme in BBC3's history.

== Episodes ==
No. overall	No. in series	Title	Directed by	Original release date
15	1	"Eels"	Paul King	15 November 2007
Naboo and Bollo go away to go to Dennis the Head Shaman's stag party, leaving Howard and Vince in charge of Nabootique. The two challenge one another to a sales contest, each trying to sell their latest fads; Elbow Patches and The Indie Celebrity Radar, respectively. Later, while Vince is out to tag Pete Neon for his Celebradar, Howard is paid a visit by The Hitcher, who frightens Howard with eels into a protection racket. Howard proceeds to prostitute himself to a transvestite called Eleanor for the required €1,000, but when the Hitcher comes to collect the money, he decides to kill Vince and Howard anyway. Before being able to do so, he is shot by Eleanor. The Hitcher awakens, having been saved by the Survival Elbow Patch he had stolen from Howard earlier. Feeling dejected, he turns to leave, before being stopped by Vince and Howard, who convince him to perform a song about eels with them in the New Rave style.
16	2	"Journey to the Centre of the Punk"	Paul King	22 November 2007
Howard acquires a rare Jazz record ("Voodoo Scat" by Howlin' Jimmy Jefferson) which Vince, now a punk, bites into, submitting to peer pressure from his new punk bandmates. It transpires that "Voodoo Scat" was made with a drop of Howlin' Jimmy Jefferson's blood, infecting Vince's bloodstream with a malignant rogue Jazz cell, causing him to embarrass his bandmates by scat singing at their gig in the Velvet Onion, which causes a riot. Vince is rushed back to the Nabootique, delirious, as the Jazz cell begins killing his cells. To save him, Naboo shrinks Howard and his blind friend Lester Corncrake down to microscopic size and injects them into Vince's body to kill the invasive cell. Howard eventually succeeds in reaching the brain, where the Jazz cell begins to chase him. Howard and Lester catch it, and regrow to normal size. The Jazz cell is now also normal size, but is defeated by Lester, who stabs him with Sid Vicious' safety pin, causing him to stumble away crying, falling over one of the now dead former bandmates and dying in the doorway.
17	3	"The (Power of the) Crimp"	Paul King	29 November 2007
Vince arrives at work late, depressed and distraught that a copycat named Lance Dior is stealing his style. Howard attempts to cheer him up by showing him Gary Numan and by telling him its what's inside that counts. Howard quickly abandons this philosophy when he has his style stolen by Lance Dior's partner, Harold Boom (Simon Farnaby), who together become The Flighty Zeus. As The Flighty Zeus become increasingly more popular, The Mighty Boosh become increasingly dejected, feeling the Zeus are always one step ahead of them. The Boosh almost give up, before having the idea of premiering their music invention, crimping, at a gig at The Velvet Onion. They arrive to find The Flighty Zeus plagiarising an earlier crimp of theirs. The Boosh challenge the Zeus to a crimp-off, eventually winning by way of a four-way crimp, involving Howard, Vince, Naboo, and Bollo.
18	4	"The Strange Tale of the Crack Fox"	Paul King	6 December 2007
Howard departs to a jazzercise class, leaving Vince to sort out the towering pile of bin bags in the back alley behind the Nabootique. Whilst doing so, Vince meets an urban crack addict fox named The Crack Fox, whom he invites into the Nabootique. The Crack Fox then knocks Vince unconscious, and steals Naboo's powerful Shaman juice. Vince lies to Naboo, saying it is Howard who is responsible. Naboo then fires Howard, and is imprisoned by the Board of Shaman to be executed. Vince eventually decides to attempt to save Naboo, meeting Howard, who has taken up his old bin man job again, on the way. Howard and Vince descend to the sewers, discovering the Crack Fox, who has taken some of the stolen Shaman Juice and now wields supernatural powers. Howard and Vince recover the Shaman Juice, and are chased through the sewers by the Crack Fox, who is eventually crushed to death by a bin lorry, which is waiting for him at the sewer exit. Howard and Vince then rescue Naboo, and the Board of Shaman celebrate by taking drugs.
19	5	"Party"	Paul King	13 December 2007
Vince convinces Howard (by paying a female friend of his to feign an interest in jazz and stationery) to allow him to throw a party in the flat, supposedly in celebration of Howard's birthday, but in reality for Vince to show off his new outfit. He invites all his friends, who are seemingly unaware of who Howard is, or what his involvement in the party might be. After a short game of spin the bottle downstairs in the Nabootique, which is broken up by Naboo, Howard inadvertently reveals that he is a virgin. As everyone awkwardly heads back upstairs, Vince is propositioned by the wife of Dennis the Head Shaman in the stock room. When Vince discovers her identity he leaves immediately, claiming that Dennis will kill him, and sure enough, once he has discovered his wife's infidelity Dennis vows to kill Vince. Attempting to hide on the roof, Vince finds a dejected Howard. Dennis then catches up with Vince, who pretends to be in love with Howard by kissing him. This repulses Dennis into leaving, but has an inadvertent effect on Howard... The two then fall off the roof and on to Vince's present for Howard: a bouncy castle. Howard proceeds to renounce his new-found homosexuality as soon as he sees the jazz girl from the start of the episode, but Vince is heartbroken and claims he will never love again; until his female friend walks outside. The episode ends with the whole party on the bouncy castle.
20	6	"The Chokes"	Paul King	20 December 2007
Vince is MCing a night at the Velvet Onion, which is being headlined by The Black Tubes, who have a strict thin-legs policy. Although Vince is desperate to join as their singer, they will only allow him to if he can fit into a pair of drainpipe trousers that they give him. After learning that Jurgen Haabermaaster, a Danish art-house director, will be in the audience to see acclaimed actor Sammy the Crab, Howard tries to get onto the bill in a bid to win a part in one of Jurgen's films. However, Vince won't let him as he suffers from The Chokes, an intense form of stage fright. To cure him of this, Howard is involved in an acting montage with aged actor Montgomery Flange, who has a heart attack after absorbing Howard's Chokes and showing him his impersonation of a crab. The Black Tubes, unaware that Sammy the Crab is a raging alcoholic, pour beer in his tank upon his request, and he proceeds to run amok, killing support act The Blue McEnroes in the process. Vince phones Howard as a replacement, who stuns everyone – including Jurgen and a cheese plant – with his impressive acting. Vince eventually gets his drainpipes on, but the excess weight is squeezed up to his head, causing him to overbalance onstage, ruining the gig. It later transpires that Sammy The Crab has replaced him as the frontman of The Black Tubes. Howard returns from working with Jurgen Haabermaaster, dissatisfied with the work he was offered. It turns out his only role was the Angry Crab of Trapped Wind in a trapped wind commercial, much to the amusement of Naboo, Bollo and Vince.
