= Autoboosh =

2000 stage show

Autoboosh was a 2000 stage show written and performed by Noel Fielding and Julian Barratt, along with Rich Fulcher, and, for the first time, Dave Brown, Michael Fielding, and Pete Kyriacou. It was the third incarnation of what would eventually become The Mighty Boosh.

== Overview ==
In 2000, Julian Barratt, Noel Fielding, Rich Fulcher, and Dave Brown (who played a variety of characters, as well as being the choreographer and photographer) brought their third stage show, Autoboosh, to the Melbourne International Comedy Festival, where they won the festival's Barry Humphries Award. Noel's brother Michael and his friend Pete went along for the journey, but ended up going on stage with the cast every night. Michael then became a permanent fixture, playing Naboo, whilst Pete continued to assist by playing minor characters.

Due to the success of Autoboosh, Barratt and Noel Fielding were commissioned by BBC Radio 4 to do a six-part radio series, The Boosh (radio series).
