= The Boosh (radio series) =

British radio series

- Other names: The Mighty Boosh
- Genre: Surreal comedy, double act
- Running time: 30 minutes
- Country of origin: United Kingdom
- Language: English
- Home station: BBC London Live
- Syndicates: BBC Radio 4 BBC Radio 4 Extra
- TV adaptations: The Mighty Boosh
- Starring: Julian Barratt; Noel Fielding; Rich Fulcher; Lee Mack; Richard Ayoade
- Produced by: Danny Wallace
- Original release: 16 October – 20 November 2001
- No. of series: 1
- No. of episodes: 6
- Audio format: Stereo
- Website: BBC Programmes page

The Boosh (released on CD as The Mighty Boosh) is a 2001 radio series, written and performed by The Mighty Boosh (Julian Barratt, Noel Fielding, and Rich Fulcher), and originally broadcast on BBC London Live, then BBC Radio 4, and later BBC 7.

== Overview ==
The Boosh were signed by the BBC soon after the success of Autoboosh and in October 2001 The Boosh, produced by Danny Wallace, was first broadcast on BBC London Live, then BBC Radio 4, and later BBC 7. This six-part series won the Douglas Adams Award for innovative comedy writing. The set is available from the BBC on audio CD, titled The Mighty Boosh. According to the interview track included in the set, Julian Barratt did the primary editing for the radio show. The plots to all the episodes were reworked extensively and reused in the first TV series.

The Mighty Boosh returned to radio on 22 October 2004, when they did a comedy special for The Breezeblock, a show on BBC Radio 1. Instead of the plot driven nature of the series, this show featured improvised conversational comedy with Barratt, Fielding and Fulcher, combined with the show's usual mix of electronic music.

== List of episodes ==
No.	Title	Producer	Original release date
1	"Stolen"	Danny Wallace	16 October 2001
A mysterious character called "The Phantom" is stealing animals from the zoo. Howard and Vince go on a mission to find the thief and the sinister figure behind the plot.
2	"Jungle"	Danny Wallace	23 October 2001
Tired of Bob Fossil's management, Howard and Vince venture into the zoo's Jungle Room in search of former zoo boss Tommy Nookah, (Howard's Idol) who disappeared there long ago.
3	"Jazz"	Danny Wallace	30 October 2001
Vince forms a rock band, but after annoying the guitarist Dave, and driving him to quit, he calls on Howard to overcome the Spirit of Jazz and join them.
4	"Mutants"	Danny Wallace	6 November 2001
When keeper Joey Moose is savagely bitten, Howard and Vince investigate and discover Bob Fossil is breeding mutant animals to sell to wealthy Japanese businessmen.
5	"Tundra"	Danny Wallace	13 November 2001
Bob Fossil sends Vince to Spain and Howard to the Arctic to collect more animals for the zoo. The two end up back together facing the perils of the tundra.
6	"Hitcher"	Danny Wallace	20 November 2001
Howard and Vince take Tony the prawn to the Zoo For Animal Offenders. Along the way they meet a mysterious hitch-hiker, and end up in the bizarre world of "The People of the Box".

On 8 November 2004, a 3 disc set was released by BBC Audiobooks containing all 6 episodes from the series, plus extra material.

In April 2020 the full first series was made available on the BBC Sounds audio player.
