= The Mighty Boosh series 1 =

The Mighty Boosh
- Season 1
- DVD cover art
- No. of episodes: 8

Release
- Original network: BBC Three
- Original release: 18 May – 6 July 2004

Series chronology
- Next → Series 2

The first series of The Mighty Boosh was originally broadcast between 18 May 2004 and 6 July 2004. It features five main cast members: Julian Barratt, Noel Fielding, Rich Fulcher, Michael Fielding and Dave Brown, and centres on Howard Moon and Vince Noir (Julian Barratt and Noel Fielding), and the adventures they have whilst working at a zoo. A DVD of the series was released on 29 August 2005 in Region 2. Series 1 began to air in America on Adult Swim from 29 March 2009.

== Overview ==
=== Setting ===
The series is set in a dilapidated zoo known as the "Zooniverse". Howard Moon and Vince Noir work there as zookeepers under manager Bob Fossil and owner Dixon Bainbridge. Naboo the Enigma also works there as the resident shaman. Howard and Vince often leave the Zooniverse for various adventures throughout the series, visiting locations such as Limbo, Monkey Hell, and the Arctic tundra.

=== Production ===
A pilot episode for the series was filmed in front of a live studio audience and Matt Lucas and David Walliams were present in the audience. Certain scenes from the pilot were reused in the episode "Tundra" and it was directed by Steve Bendelack. The BBC then commissioned the series in May 2003 and rehearsals took place throughout 2003, and filming took place in Studio 11 of Three Mills Studios in London, England, from January 2004, directed by Paul King. Episodes were shot on tape, then filmized in post-production; the outtakes on the DVD are presented raw, pre-filmization. Following series were shot digitally at 25 frames per second.

=== Reception ===
The series was a nominee for The Best Newcomer at the British Comedy Awards 2004.

== Episodes ==
No. overall	No. in series	Title	Directed by	Original release date
1	1	"Killeroo"	Paul King	18 May 2004
Howard is blackmailed by Bob Fossil into participating in an illegal underground boxing match with a violent kangaroo. Howard thinks that by winning the fight he will impress Mrs Gideon, Head of Reptiles, so Vince decides to help him by training him up. He wins by Vince tightly squeezing the kangaroo's testicles whilst Howard punches the kangaroo in the face. Oly Ralfe, vocalist of the Ralfe Band, makes a cameo in this episode as Jimmy the Reach. He is seen in both the gym and at the very end of the episode.
2	2	"Mutants"	Paul King	25 May 2004
Animals at the Zooniverse are rapidly disappearing without a trace; when Mrs Gideon's python and a zookeeper go missing, Howard and Vince decide to investigate. They soon discover Dixon Bainbridge's secret laboratory within the zoo and find out the terrible secret of the missing animals. He is kidnapping people and surgically joining them with the zoo's animals to create mutant hybrids.
3	3	"Bollo"	Paul King	1 June 2004
Bollo, a gorilla at the zoo, becomes terminally ill. When the Grim Reaper comes to take him away, he mistakenly takes Howard, who is wearing a gorilla suit, so that Bob Fossil can continue to accept sponsorship money for the gorillas. Vince travels to Limbo and Monkey Hell to save Howard from death.
4	4	"Tundra"	Paul King & Steve Bendelack	8 June 2004
Dixon Bainbridge boasts to the Zooniverse staff about his adventures in the arctic tundra, so Howard travels there with Vince to retrieve the Egg of Mantumbi and prove that he is more of a man. They come face-to-face with the hideous ice demon Black Frost. They are rescued by a polar bear which Vince had recently become friends with. They bring back what they think is the egg, but it is found to be fake. Bainbridge obtains the real egg.
5	5	"Jungle"	Paul King	15 June 2004
Bainbridge is selling the Zooniverse so that a road can be built through it. Howard is determined to stop this, so he and Vince venture into the mysterious Jungle Room in search of Tommy, the missing former owner of the zoo.
6	6	"Charlie"	Paul King	22 June 2004
Howard attempts to write a novel in order to impress Mrs Gideon. At the same time, Vince's illustrated stories about a hideous bubble-gum creature named Charlie are suddenly discovered by a publisher, instantly turning him into a famous writer. However, his dream is quickly shattered by Dixon Bainbridge. Meanwhile, Howard undergoes psychiatric help from resident shaman Naboo, and Bob Fossil uses Vince to start a new breeding program for the zoo's pandas.
7	7	"Electro"	Paul King	29 June 2004
Vince joins an up-and-coming electro band called Kraftwork Orange, but causes Johnny Two-Hats, the band's keyboard player, programmer, songwriter and manager, to leave the band in disgust. Out of desperation, he calls on Howard to overcome the Spirit of Jazz and help him out for an important concert. The episode features guest stars Sue Denim and Dee Plume of Robots in Disguise.
8	8	"Hitcher"	Paul King	6 July 2004
After a bear named Ivan goes wild and attacks Bob Fossil, Howard and Vince are tasked with transporting him to The Zoo for Animal Offenders. On the way, they get lost in the forest and encounter a mysterious hitch-hiker.
