= The Breezeblock =

Music programme on BBC Radio 1

The Breezeblock was a weekly radio programme on BBC Radio 1 that premiered on 17 February 1997 and focused on electronic music. The show's earliest broadcasts were unmixed and featured individual songs, some of which were recordings of live sessions from BBC's Maida Vale Studio. Soon, however, its format shifted to setlists mixed by a variety of electronic acts, both mainstream and underground. This change reflected the show's increasingly eclectic musical sensibility as it equally embraced the populist and the avant-garde.

The style of music featured on The Breezeblock was consistently wide-ranging, and included (among others) alt-country, chillout, acid jazz, hip-hop, techno, funk, and reggae—with selections coming from all eras. Still, the show's ostensible focus was on experimental (or "leftfield") electronic music. As such, it was common to hear songs from more exotic genres like IDM, drum & bass, post-rock, glitch, and turntablism on many broadcasts. The show was also influential in promoting grime and dubstep, two subgenres—then little known—that arose from the London music scene in the late 1990s and early 2000s.

The show was hosted by Mary Anne Hobbs throughout its history, with occasional fill-ins by other BBC Radio 1 personalities. Highlights of the show's long run include ambitious sets by Jason Pierce of Spiritualized, DJ Shadow, and The Bug, and also special presentations that introduced listeners to specific topics—for example, the genre oldschool jungle or the urban music culture of Berlin. Notably, the tribute to Aphex Twin (an alias of Richard D. James) that aired on 7 December 2005 is also well-received despite the fact that James was not personally involved with the set. In 2000 Radio 1 listeners voted for Jon Carter as the Breezeblock Mix of 1999 at the NME Premier Awards, co-hosted by Hobbs.

On 25 September 2006 the Breezeblock moniker was dropped and the show renamed to Mary Anne Hobbs: BBC Radio 1's Experimental Show. Though accompanied by a time slot change, the show's format, purpose, and breadth of genre have remained very similar. The last live Breezeblock/Experimental Show aired 2 September 2010, two repeats (Dubstep Wars from 10 January 2006 and Sonar 2010 Special from 24 June 2010) were aired on 9 September 2010.

- The Breezeblock is named after the breeze block (cinder block) in the sense that the show was seen as a promotional foundation for emerging forms of electronic music.
- The show briefly featured the comedy double act of Ricky Gervais and his mate Steve in a short comedy segment each show wherein they would appraise the latest goings on in the alternative music scene.

== See also ==
- Annie Mac
- Essential Mix
