= Michael Fielding =

British comedian and actor (born 1982)

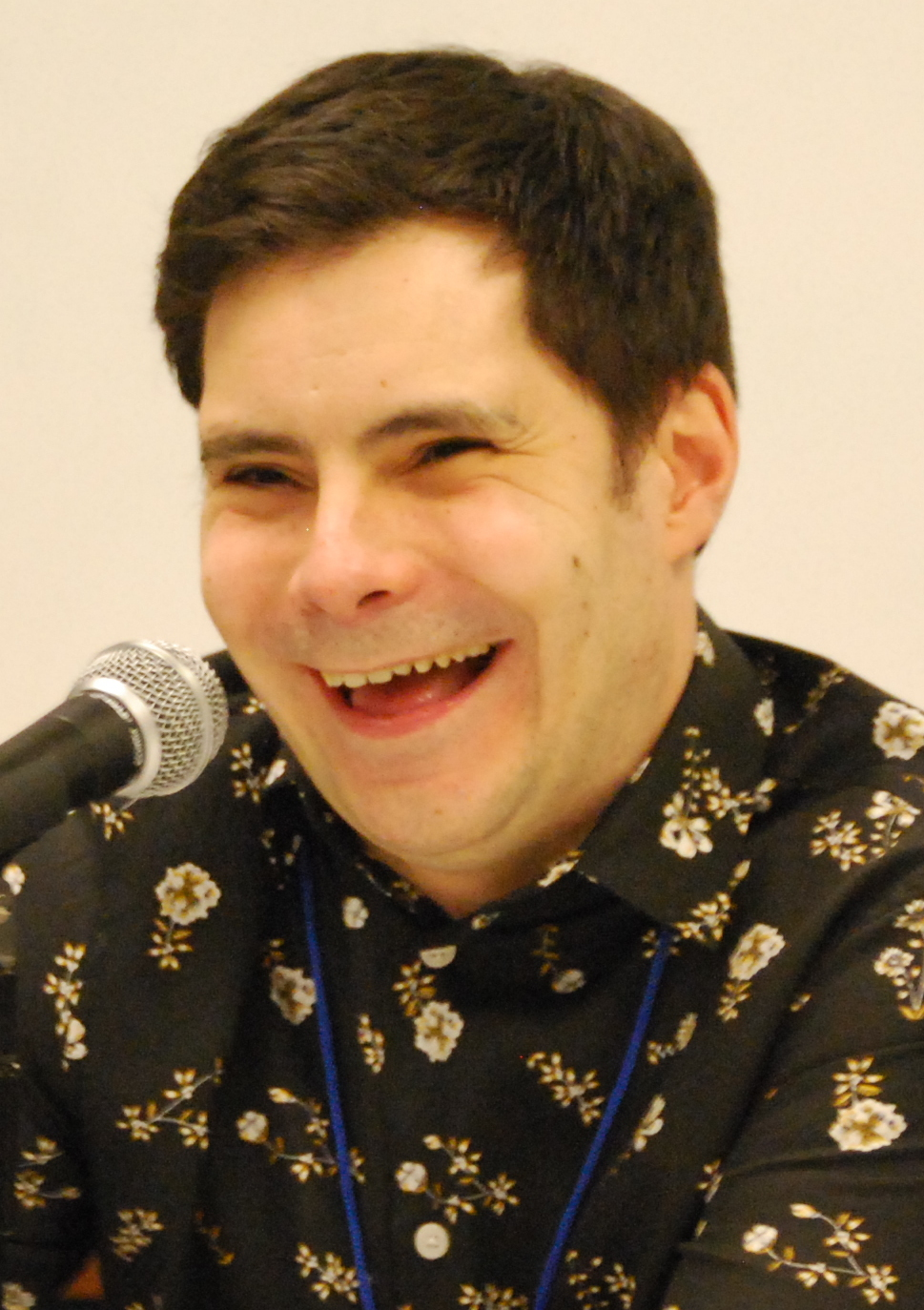
- Fielding in 2018
- Born: 23 January 1982 (age 44); London, England
- Notable work: Naboo the Enigma in The Mighty Boosh
- Relatives: Noel Fielding (half-brother)

Comedy career
- Years active: 1997–present
- Medium: Stand-up, television, radio
- Genre: Comedy

Michael Fielding (born 23 January 1982) is a British comedian and actor, known for his role as Naboo in the British surreal comedy The Mighty Boosh. He was born in Westminster, London, England and raised in Mitcham, Southwest London. Other works include the role of Smooth, the butler, in Noel Fielding's Luxury Comedy, and more recently Benny Turpin in The Completely Made-Up Adventures of Dick Turpin.

== Career ==
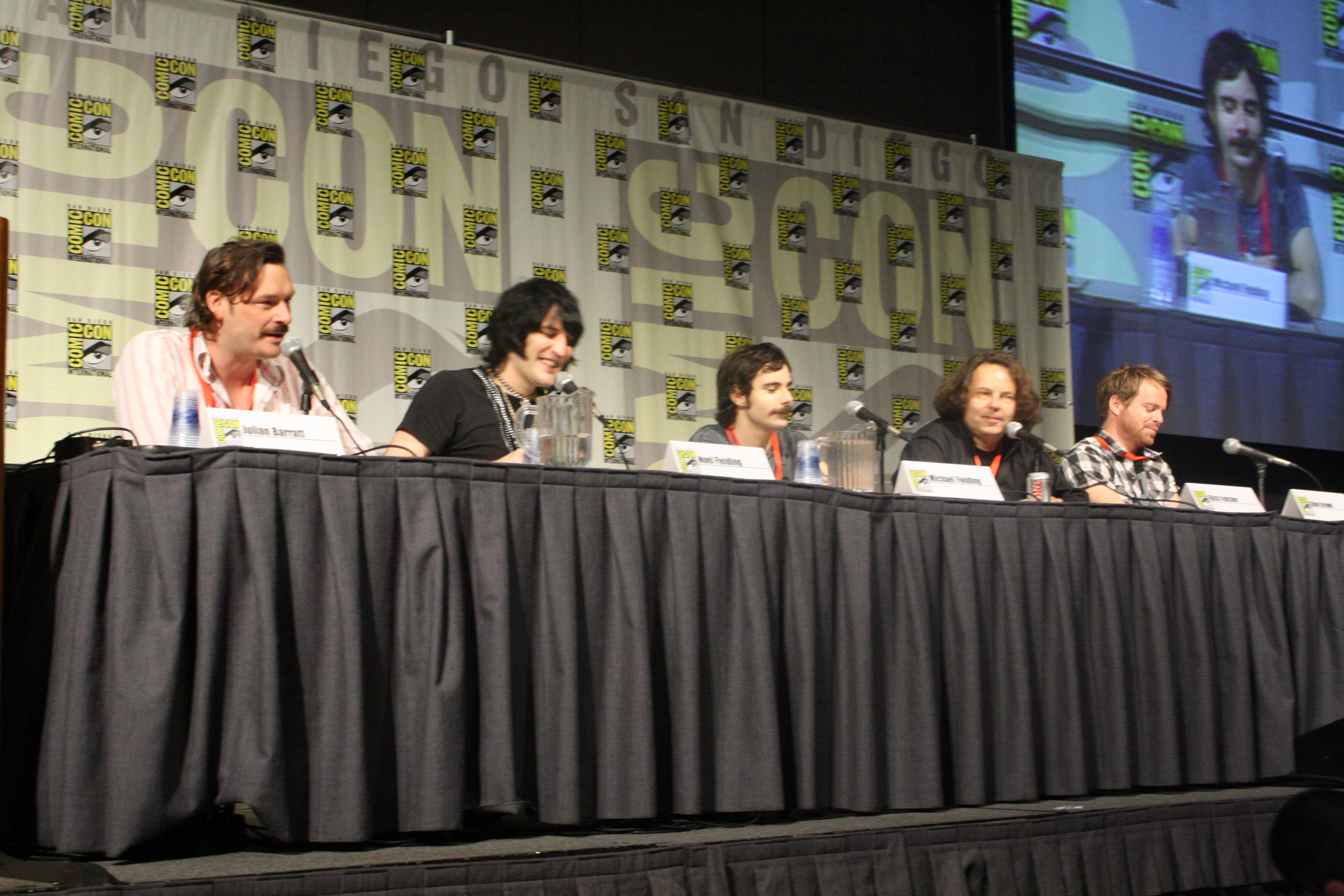
The cast of the Mighty Boosh at Comic-con; from left to right Julian Barratt, Noel Fielding, Michael Fielding, Rich Fulcher, Dave Brown (2009)

Fielding appeared on his elder brother Noel Fielding and Julian Barratt's show, The Mighty Boosh. Fielding starred in all three series as well as live tours including The Mighty Boosh Live and the Future Sailors Tour. He performs as Naboo the Enigma, as well as other minor characters. In addition, he starred in Noel Fielding's Luxury Comedy. Fielding played Benny Turpin, the brother of Noel Fielding's title character in the 2024 series The Completely Made-Up Adventures of Dick Turpin.

=== The Mighty Boosh ===
Fielding is best known for playing Naboo the Enigma, the shaman on The Mighty Boosh, co-written by and co-starring his elder brother, Noel Fielding. He first became part of The Mighty Boosh when a stage show version of it was taken to Australia for the Melbourne comedy Festival titled Autoboosh. His character is often seen with a hookah pipe and makes a few drug references throughout the series.

Noel said in an interview with Jonathan Ross that the abstract name of the show came about from one of Michael's Portuguese friends who described his hair as being like a "mighty bush", owing to Michael's curly hairstyle as a child. Michael has since confirmed his brother's story about The Mighty Boosh name, but revealed that his friend was actually Spanish.

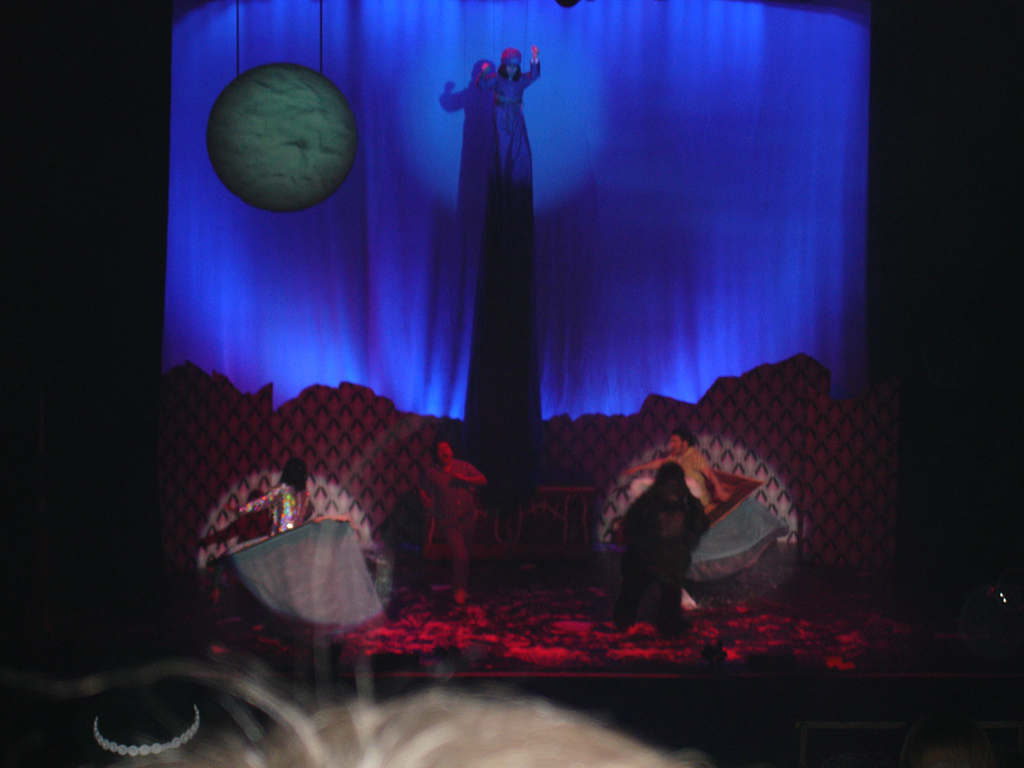
The magic carpet finale of the Mighty Boosh Live stageshow. March 2006

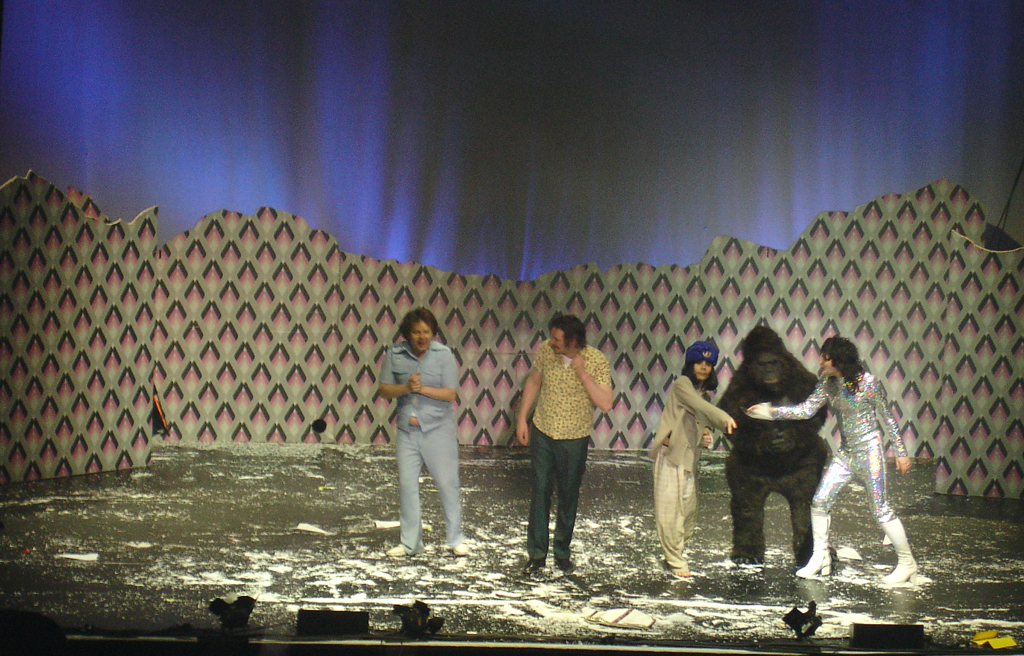
The Mighty Boosh Live stage show. March 2006

=== Noel Fielding's Luxury Comedy ===
Michael Fielding is also known for his roles in Noel Fielding's Luxury Comedy. He played the main character Smooth, Noel's purple anteater-like butler. He also played the minor character Doo Rag.

== Personal life ==
Following the end of the run of Autoboosh at the Melbourne Comedy Festival in 2000, Fielding and a friend toured around Australia for two months and then moved into a flat in St. Kilda, having received a year long visa to stay in Australia. Whilst living in St Kilda Fielding worked as a "glassie" at the same venue, "Hi-Fi", where they had performed the shows for Autoboosh, as well as working in the cloak room. In an audio commentary on the DVD release of the first season of The Mighty Boosh, Noel commented that his brother and friend only lived there for a year but they 'had the time of their lives'.

Fielding is openly gay and is in a relationship with his partner Mark.
