= Dave Brown (comedian) =

British comedian, designer and photographer (born 1973)

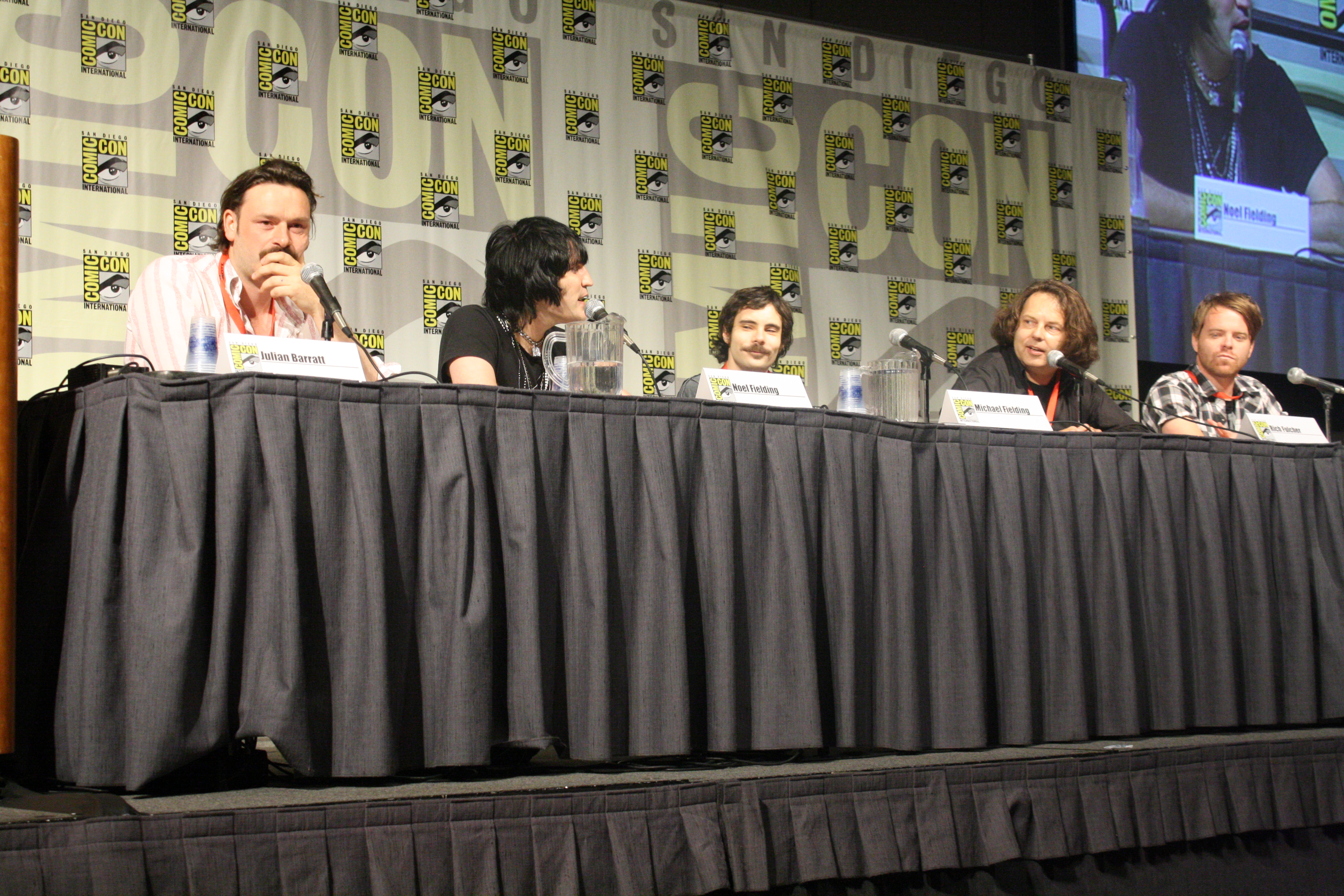
The cast of the Mighty Boosh at comic-con; from left to right Julian Barratt, Noel Fielding, Michael Fielding, Rich Fulcher and Dave Brown. 2009

Dave Brown (born 24 August 1973) is a British comedian, designer and photographer. In The Mighty Boosh television series and live stage shows, he played Bollo the Ape, as well as several other minor characters. He also choreographed the dance routines.

== Biography ==
He is originally from Southend in Essex, where he attended South East Essex College.

In 1992, he began studying graphic design and advertising at Buckinghamshire Chilterns University College from which he later graduated.

Brown first met Mighty Boosh collaborator Noel Fielding whilst Fielding was studying for a foundation course in fine art at Croydon Art College. Between 1992 and 1995, Fielding also began studying for a BA in Graphic Design and Advertising at Buckinghamshire College of Higher Education in High Wycombe. Whilst at Buckinghamshire College both Dave Brown and Nigel Coan were studying the same course as Fielding and all three shared a student house together. Nigel Coan also collaborated with Fielding on the Mighty Boosh.

It has also been commented that whilst Noel Fielding and Brown were both art students at Buckinghamshire College of Higher Education "They were both regular visitors to the Hellfire Comedy nights next to the Wycombe Swan Theatre in High Wycombe, which is where Noel first met future Boosh co-creator, Julian Barratt". Brown also used to live with Fielding and fellow mighty Boosh collaborator Nigel Coan in a flat in Hackney, London.

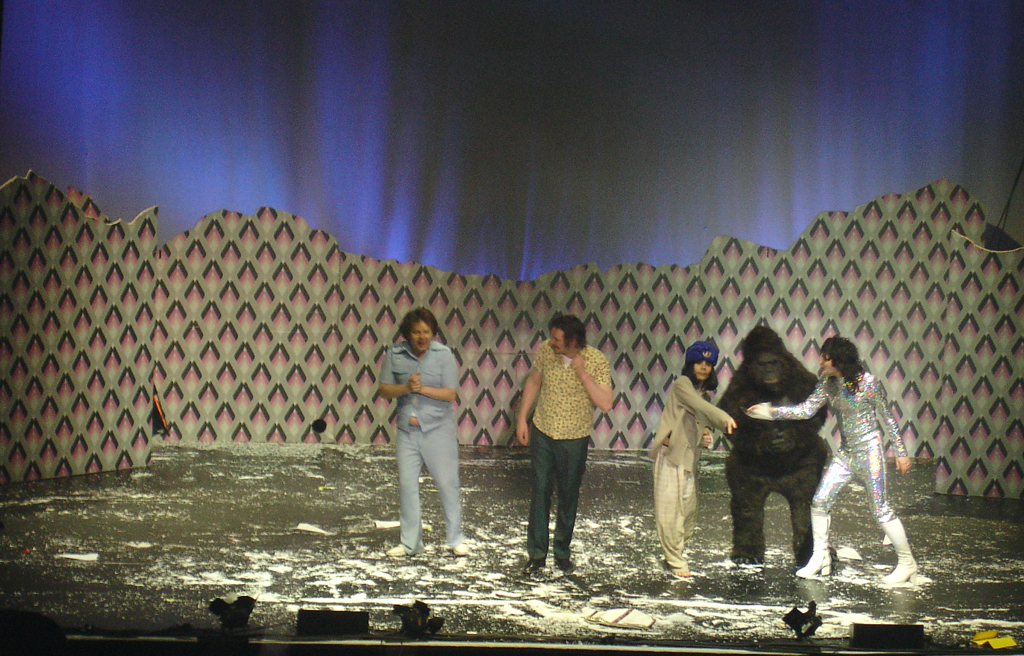
Dave Brown performing as Bollo in The Mighty Boosh Live 2006 stage show. From left to right: Rich Fulcher, Julian Barratt, Michael Fielding, Dave Brown and Noel Fielding. March 2006

Brown designed the DVD cover for the Mighty Boosh live tour and boxset and also "...designed and compiled The Mighty Book of Boosh..." as well as all the publishing output for the Mighty Boosh.

In 2005, Brown participated in a documentary on The Mighty Boosh in which he describes how in 1998 in the shows early days it was performed in a theatre bar, the Hen and Chickens in London and then also in 1998 it was taken to the Edinburgh Fringe Festival and then later from 2004 to 2007 it was put on Television on BBC Three.

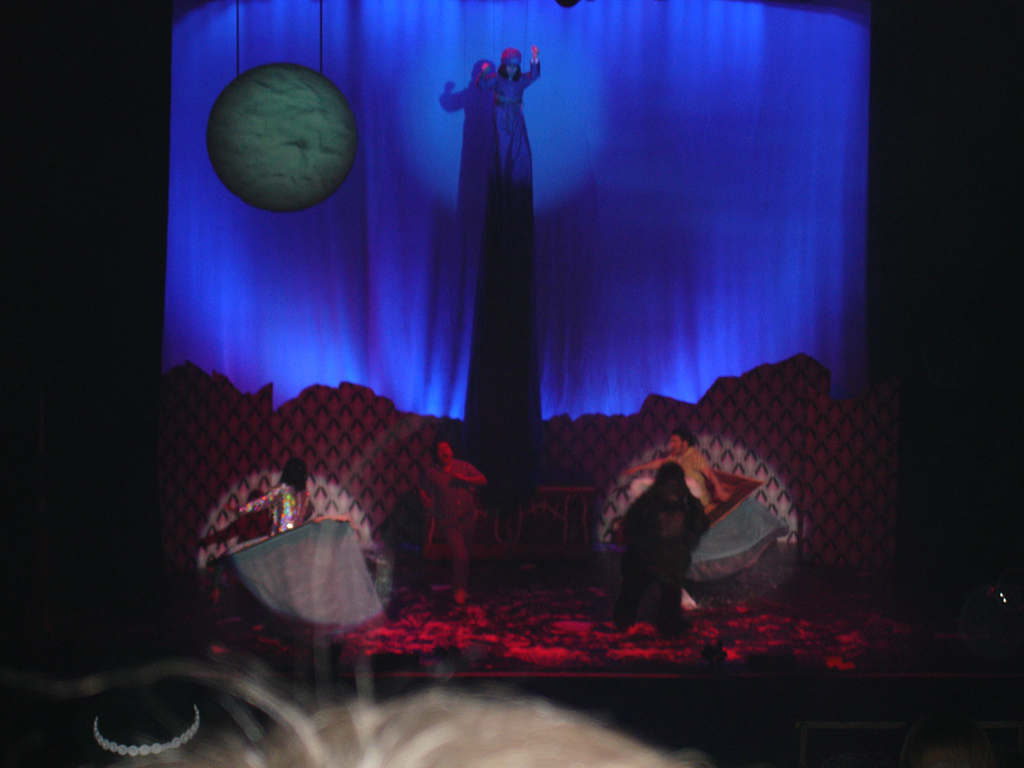
From Left to right;Noel Fielding as Vince Noir, Rich Fulcher as Bob Fossil, Michael Fielding as Naboo, Dave Brown as Bollo and Julian Barratt as Howard Moon. Performing in the stageshow the Mighty Boosh Live. March 2006

In 2012, it was commented that Brown was showing "...an exhibition of comedians' photographs. ...at London's Strand Gallery..." The exhibition called "Tough Crowd" included photos of Jimmy Carr, Harry Hill, Bill Bailey, Tony Law, Noel Fielding and Lee Mack. Limited edition, signed prints were available to purchase, with all profits going to AfriKids, a charity operating in Ghana to try and alleviate the acute child suffering, for which Brown is an Ambassador. Brown worked with Jimmy Carr during one of his tours as stage hand/photographer.

In relation to the exhibition at the Strand Gallery Brown commented that "Comedians are, by their very nature, tough – they have to be. We always see them mucking about with big smiles on their faces, the funny man, the wacky women telling jokes, getting the laughs, the awards, the fame. But before all this, in the early days, when they were starting out, it has to be one of the hardest jobs in the world.Travelling to the darkest corners of the country often on their own, all to stand in the corner of a beer stained room on an upturned crate, shouting their hard thought through, well crafted, deeply personal material to six alcoholics and a comatose dog, you don't get much tougher than that! At some point in their careers they've all been heckled by a drunk, dropped by an agent, cancelled on a bill and delivered a punchline to total silence. I want to capture a glimpse of these thick skinned, seriously tough, complex, moody characters and try to show them in a different light to the usual smiley happy go lucky comedy world image we're used to."
