= Seven Dwarves (disambiguation) =

The Seven Dwarves are characters in the fairy tale "Snow White".

Seven Dwarves may also refer to:

- Seven Dwarves (TV series), a British seven-part documentary reality television series
- 7 Dwarves – Men Alone in the Wood, a German 2004 comedy film
- "The seven dwarves", a series of small defensive emplacements built between 1912 and 1916 as part of the fortifications of Metz
