= The Mighty Boosh series 2 =

The Mighty Boosh
- Season 2
- DVD cover art
- No. of episodes: 6

Release
- Original network: BBC Three
- Original release: 26 July – 30 August 2005

Series chronology
- ← Previous; Series 1 Next → Series 3

The Mighty Boosh's second series was originally broadcast between 26 July 2005 and 30 August 2005. The series features five main cast members: Julian Barratt, Noel Fielding, Rich Fulcher, Michael Fielding and Dave Brown. The second series centers on Howard Moon (Barratt) and Vince Noir (Fielding), and the adventures they have whilst living in their flat. A DVD of the series was released on 13 February 2006 in Region 2, and on 21 July 2009 in Region 1. The DVD also included the pilot episode for 'The Boosh', made in 2003, before the first series. The episode was titled 'Tundra' and was remade for the first series.

== Overview ==
=== Setting ===
The series is set in a flat in Dalston, England, where Howard Moon and Vince Noir, Naboo the Enigma and Bollo the Ape moved into after leaving the Zoo-niverse. Many of the episodes revolve around Howard and Vince's attempts at building a career out of their band, often leaving the flat during their adventures. The adventures of Naboo, now a freelance shaman, and Bollo, now Naboo's familiar, often serve as a subplot.

=== Production ===
A second series was commissioned by the BBC in July 2004, after the success of the first series. This was followed by extensive writing sessions, lasting until the actual filming, which took place from June to July 2005. Unlike the first series, (which by the plots were based upon the radio series) series 2 storylines were completely original and introduced new characters such as the Moon and Old Gregg, as well as a reappearance of the Hitcher from series 1.

=== Reception ===
The second series of The Mighty Boosh was the first BBC programme to be made available online before being shown on television, a method which drew in at least 36,000 viewers.

== Episodes ==
No. overall	No. in series	Title	Directed by	Original release date
9	1	"Call of the Yeti"	Paul King	26 July 2005
Howard takes Vince, Naboo and Bollo on a weekend holiday to a cabin in the woods, owned by a yokel, Kodiak Jack. Naboo and Bollo, bored by the prospect of a lecture from Howard, go shopping, leaving Vince with Howard. Kodiak Jack arrives, taking a liking to Vince, who is once again mistaken as a female and informing Howard, who is having delusions of grandeur about being a photographer, of the Yeti. Howard sets out to photograph the Yeti at "Piney Ridge", leaving Vince with Kodiak Jack. While shopping, Naboo learns of the Yeti's breeding night, as Vince fends off Kodiak Jack's advances. Meanwhile, Howard is captured and brainwashed by the Yeti. Vince, Naboo, and Bollo set out to save Howard, and also end up brainwashed by the Yeti. As they are all about to be raped, they are saved by Kodiak Jack, who is then instead apparently raped. However, his last words are "Oh yeah!" They flee back to the cabin, pursued by the Queen Yeti, who is eventually defeated after stepping on Vince's bulging suitcase, catapulting her through the roof. Howard, Vince, Naboo, and Bollo then return to Dalston.
10	2	"The Priest and the Beast"	Paul King	2 August 2005
Howard and Vince are up late, struggling to find a new musical direction in order to get signed the next morning by Pie Face Records. To inspire them, Naboo tells them the story of Rudi van DiSarzio and Spider Dijon; the Bongo Brothers, who form the band Rudi & Spider. Rudi and Spider wander the desert in search of inspiration, looking for the New Sound. After an argument, Spider leaves with the intention of drumming for Carlos Santana, becoming temporarily distracted by a town populated only by women. Rudi soon happens upon the town, meeting and bonding with an inhabitant of the town called Monkey, who tells him of a bandit called Betamax, who regularly terrorizes the town. Rudi and Spider reconvene; the latter then earns himself a Door of Cuckundu by refusing tickets to Santana in Rio de Janeiro from Rudi, and together go to face Betamax. Spider eventually defeats him by rewinding him with his Door of Cuckundu. Rudi & Spider then showcase their newly found sound; found inside their own minds. This is of no help to Howard and Vince, to whom Naboo gives Lucozade, telling them it is a magic potion to help their performance. Rated TV-14-S in the US. Features cameos from Razorlight and Roger Daltrey.
11	3	"Nanageddon"	Paul King	9 August 2005
Vince offers Howard the chance to spend the night with two goth girls, Anthrax and Ebola, under the agreement that he dresses like a goth. It transpires Vince drunkenly bragged to the girls that he was a Warlock, stealing Naboo's book of black magic. Vince then inadvertently summons Nanatoo; the most evil spirit known to man. The goth girls depart in disgust, as Nanatoo looks like a harmless old lady, distracting Howard and Vince from Nanatoo, who steals the book of black magic and also departs. Naboo and Bollo return, and immediately suss that Howard and Vince have summoned a demon. Naboo warns Howard and Vince of the imminence of Nanageddon, and is then summoned to the Board of Shaman who decide to remove his shaman powers, and send Saboo and Tony Harrison to retrieve the book of black magic, which neither succeed in doing. Meanwhile, Howard and Vince retrieve the book from Nanatoo at the bingo, and flee back to the flat, pursued by Nanatoo and her army of Nanas. Naboo reverses the spell, causing Nanatoo to disappear. The next day, a gothic Naboo and Bollo accompany the goth girls out, leaving Howard and Vince disgruntled. Features another appearance by the members of the band Robots in Disguise.
12	4	"Fountain of Youth"	Paul King	16 August 2005
Howard has an age crisis after being heckled at a gig of his and Vince's. After hearing from Bollo about the Fountain of Youth on Naboo's home planet Xooberon, Howard and Vince steal his amulet and travel there, where they wander the Desert of Nightmares and meet the Xooberon Tribe. Back at the flat, Naboo finds out about Howard and Vince stealing his amulet, and is annoyed that he has to save them. The Xooberon Tribe notice Vince has the amulet and make him their leader, and Howard his slave. Meanwhile, The Hitcher overviews these events, planning to steal the amulet for himself. Vince's status as the Chosen One is tested when a beast named Sandstorm threatens the Xooberon Tribe; Vince befriends him by giving him gloves which he uses to masturbate. Howard is tricked into stealing the amulet by The Hitcher, who knocks Howard out and leaves. He awakens with Vince, buried up to their necks in sand; a punishment from the Xooberon Tribe for losing the amulet. Naboo and Bollo arrive, and accompany Vince and Howard to the Fountain of Youth, hindered by an evil tree; Vince summons Sandstorm who destroys the tree. Naboo then flushes the toilet of the Fountain of Youth, liquefying The Hitcher. The King who first gave Naboo the amulet and sent him to earth in 1978 arrives and congratulates Naboo. On the way back to earth, Howard and Vince drink Youth Juice against Naboo's advice, reverting them both into newborn babies.
13	5	"The Legend of Old Gregg"	Paul King	23 August 2005
After a bad gig Howard and Vince travel to a village called Black Lake to take a break. At the pub they get the idea of going fishing; in which Vince seems instantly proficient. Vince soon leaves a disgruntled Howard to fish by himself. Vince returns to the pub where he learns about Old Gregg. Howard then inadvertently catches Old Gregg (an intersexual merman with female genitalia the creature refers to as a 'mangina') who takes him to his underwater cave. Vince phones Naboo to help him rescue Howard which Naboo grudgingly agrees to do. While having a meal with Old Gregg Howard learns of his possession of The Funk and ends up getting engaged to Old Gregg. While Old Gregg is preoccupied, Vince, Naboo and Bollo arrive in a submarine - driven by a game of Pac-Man - and rescue Howard, who steals The Funk from Old Gregg. They use it to perform at the pub; singing a song about having "The Funk". They then leave, planning to bring the funk back to London. Old Gregg is shown to be riding atop their van in a wedding dress while exposing his mangina.
14	6	"The Nightmare of Milky Joe"	Paul King	30 August 2005
Howard and Vince plan to travel to America to perform on the Pie Face Showcase. Due to Howard's fear of flying they travel by boat. However, after Vince gives the captain a mullet haircut whilst he sleeps, the two are thrown overboard and stranded on a desert island. Howard's condition quickly deteriorates due to lack of nourishment, so they decide to eat coconuts. Howard begins keeping a journal, and Vince fashions bamboo drainpipes. Howard and Vince begin arguing, and build separate huts: Vince's elaborate and complicated, compared to Howard's board on a stick. Howard fashions a male companion out of a coconut, calling it Milky Joe and eventually builds a proper hut with the "help" of Milky Joe. Milky Joe is highly intellectual, with particular interests in both fossils and Jean-Paul Sartre. Vince then fashions female companions out of coconuts called Ruby and Precious Lilywhite. Vince dates Ruby and Howard eventually ends up with Precious who turns out to be physically abusive. While Vince has a party on the beach, Howard accidentally kills Precious which he and Vince try to cover up, but they are caught on film (by a coconut filming the party) burying Precious. After a "car chase" they are caught by the coconut police and sent to coconut court, where they are found guilty of murder, and used as attractions in a coconut shy run by The Hitcher. At this point, Howard and Vince are splashed with water by a sailor, which awakens them from what turns out to be a rancid coconut-induced nightmare or "Coco-Loco" as he calls it. They return home to watch the televised version of the Pie Face Showcase; headlined by Milky Joe and the Coconuts, much to Vince & Howard's horror and disappointment.
