= Dark Nature =

Dark Nature may refer to:

- Dark Nature (2009 film), British film
- Dark Nature (2022 film), Canadian film
