= List of recurring The Mighty Boosh characters =

The central cast of The Mighty Boosh From left to right: Howard Moon (Julian Barratt), Bollo (Dave Brown), Naboo the Enigma (Michael Fielding), Vince Noir (Noel Fielding) and Bob Fossil (Rich Fulcher), as portrayed in series 3

The Mighty Boosh is a British comedy troupe featuring comedians Julian Barratt and Noel Fielding. Recurring characters from the television series, the radio series, and the various stage shows are listed below. Most of the recurring characters are played by Barratt, Noel Fielding, Michael Fielding, Rich Fulcher or Dave Brown.

== Central cast ==
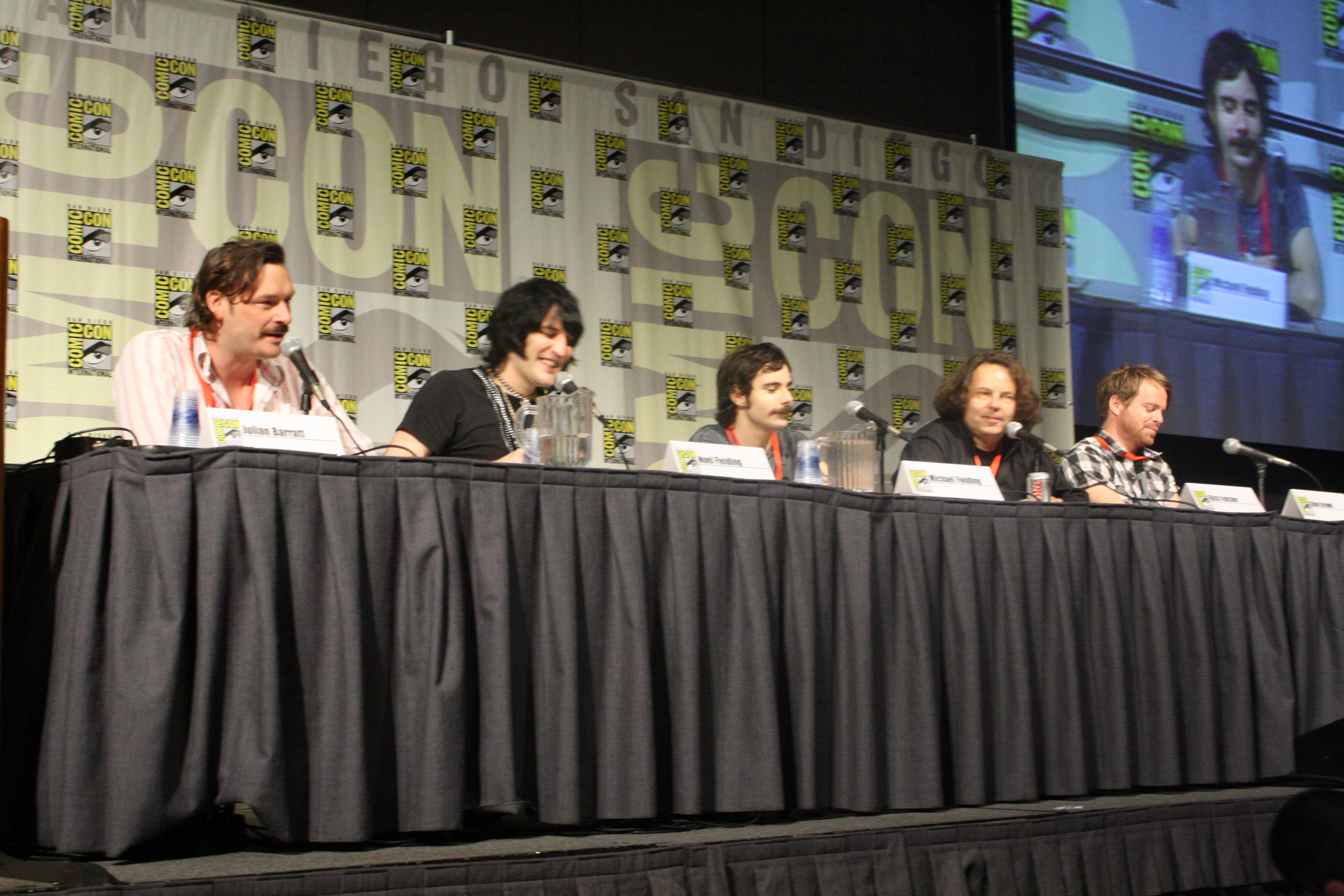
The cast of the Mighty Boosh at comic-con; from left to right Julian Barratt, Noel Fielding, Michael Fielding, Rich Fulcher and Dave Brown. 2009

The Mighty Boosh centres on the adventures of Howard Moon (Barratt) and Vince Noir (Fielding), aided by the other two members of the central cast, Naboo the Enigma (Michael Fielding) and Bollo (Peter Elliott/Dave Brown), who by series 3 they share a flat with. Bob Fossil (Rich Fulcher) is part of the central cast in series 1, becoming a recurring character thereafter.

In the course of the series a variety of bizarre and surreal recurring characters cross their paths, mostly also played by the same cast doubling up.

=== Howard Moon ===
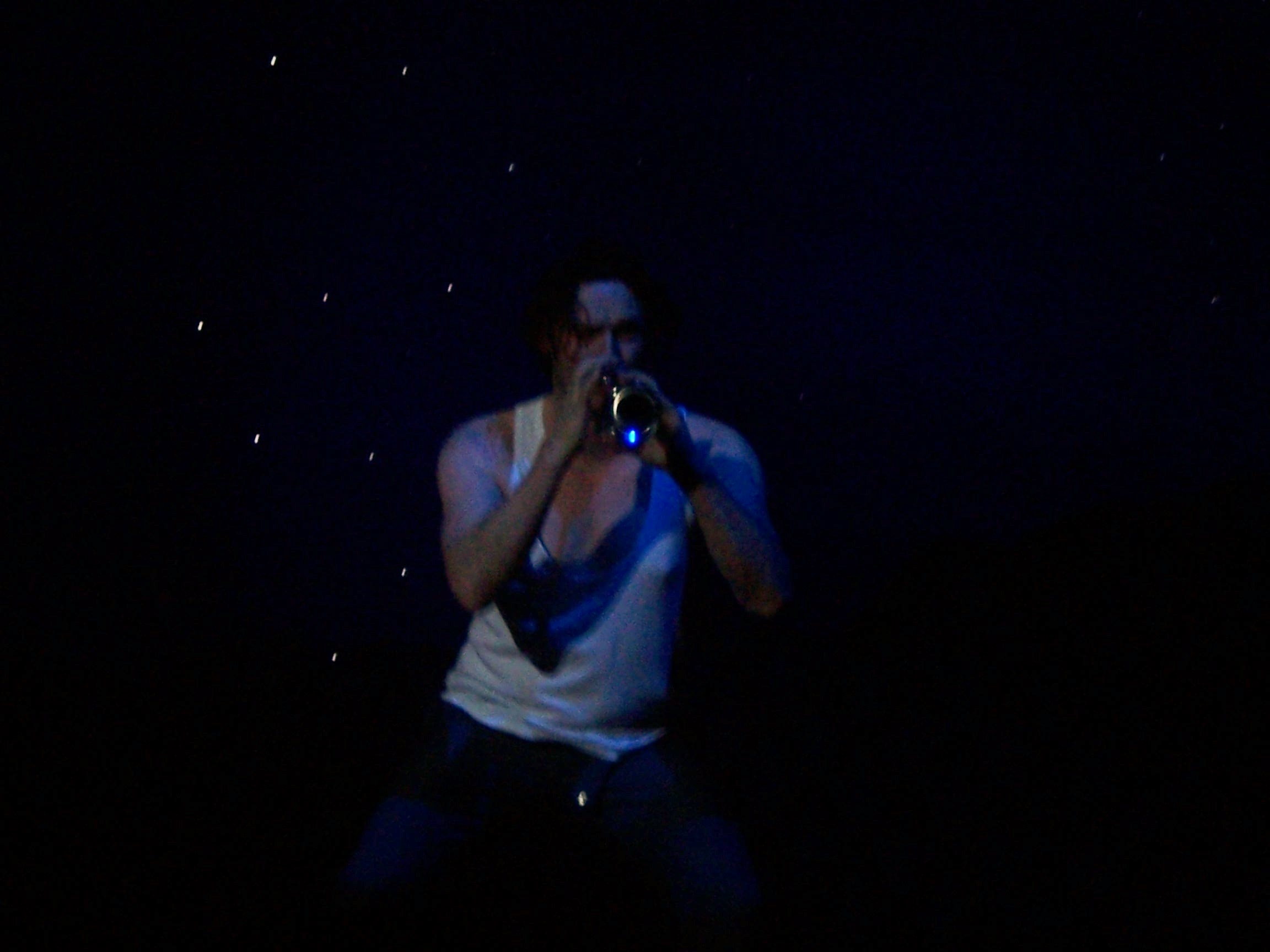
Howard Moon sending the audience into "...a jazz trance." at the Mighty Boosh Live stage show. Brighton Dome. February 2006

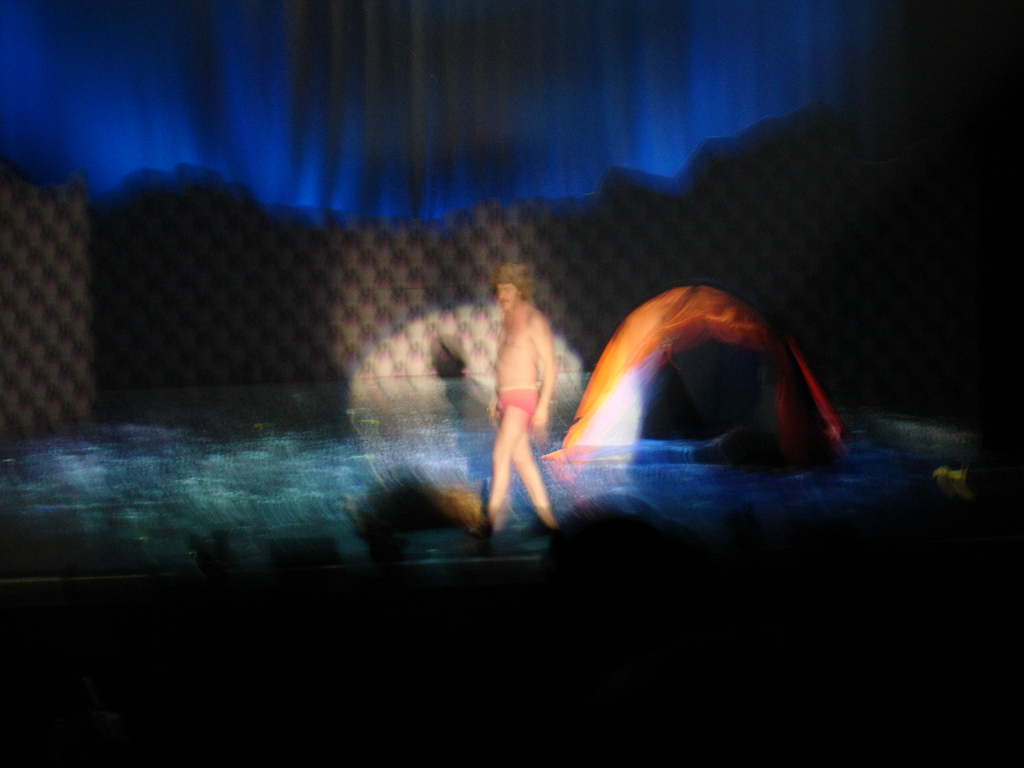
Howard Moon in the stageshow The Mighty Boosh Live. March 2006

Howard Tommy Jerry Moon is portrayed by Julian Barratt. Howard is an aspiring musician, actor, poet, novelist and photographer. In the first series he works at the Zooniverse as a zookeeper, alongside Vince. In the second series, Howard and Vince have left the zoo and formed a band together. He is vain, despite being described as "generic-looking" and often makes outrageous claims which often turn out to be true (he claims, for instance, to have turned down a lucrative offer extended by Walt Disney himself to sort all of Disney's felt-tip pens). He is unlucky in love, and in series one is in love with reptile keeper, Mrs Gideon. In the series three episode "Party", it is revealed that he is a virgin. Later in the episode Vince and Howard share a kiss in order to save Vince's life, leading Howard to announce that he has now discovered his own homosexuality and is in love with Vince. Vince is horrified, but he becomes jealous moments later when Howard begins flirting with a girl.

Whenever Howard is near to death, he pleads not to die, saying, "Don't kill me. I've got so much to give". While Vince is always dressed very flashily and into the current fashion, Howard tends to look unkempt and shabby. In the episode "Killeroo", Howard possesses an unseen disfigurement on his torso.

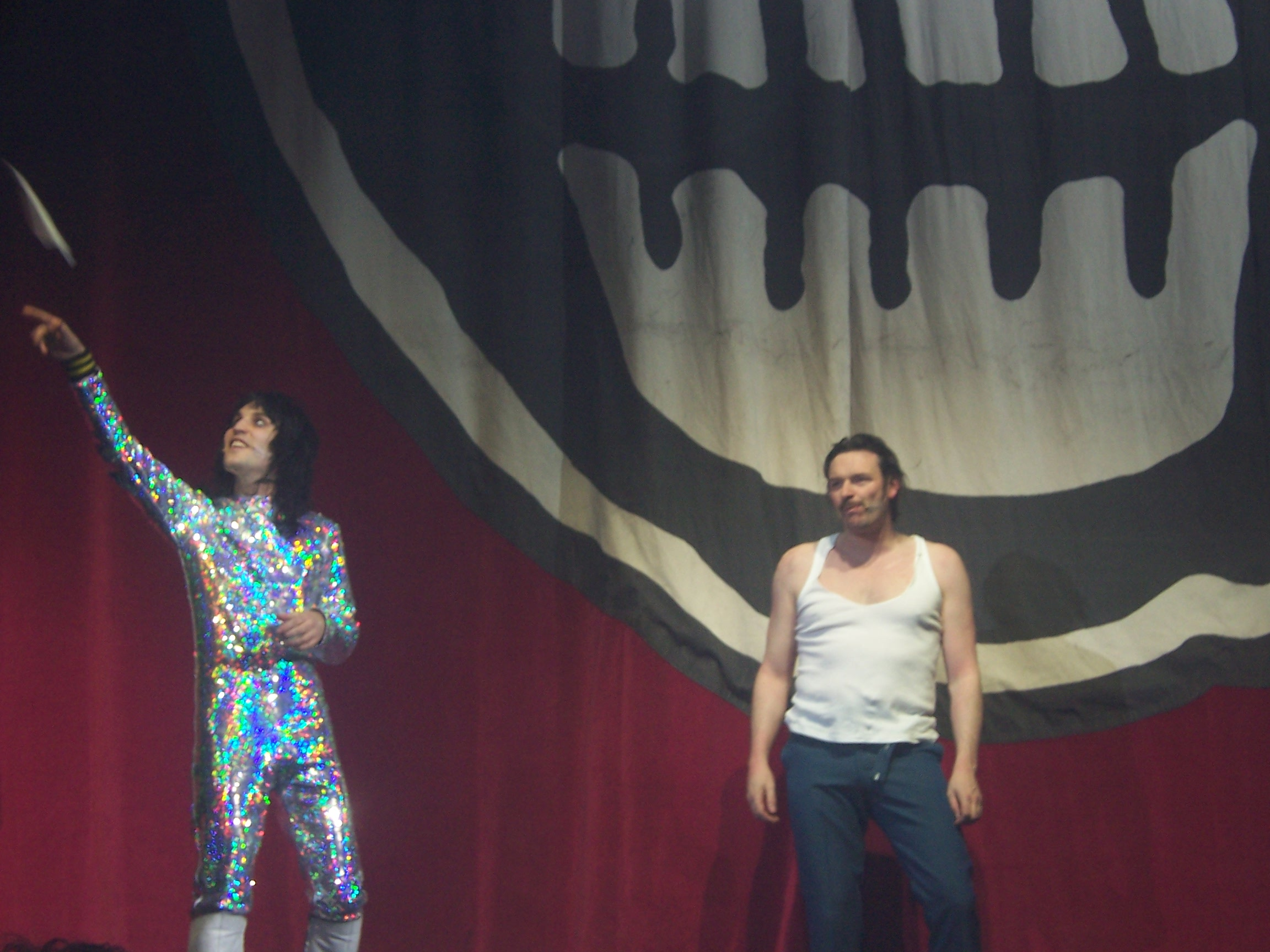
Noel Fielding and Julian Barratt as Vince Noir and Howard Moon in the stageshow The Mighty Boosh Live at the Brighton Dome. February 2006

Howard and Vince tease each other constantly, but there is a deep bond between them and both have demonstrated repeatedly that they will risk death to rescue each other from various dangerous situations. When facing death, the two will often reminisce about very mundane things—"like that one time they ate soup". This usually leads into a 'crimp': a short, completely random song and dance that quickly strays off-topic and often involves harmony.

Howard's exact age is uncertain. In the episode "Party" when Vince tells him that fifty is not that old, he corrects Vince by telling him that he is only thirty-two and goes on to state that that is ten years older than Vince is. Yet in "Fountain of Youth", during a flashback to the pair's school days, he exclaims that he is the same age as Vince, despite looking much older, and it is mentioned several times throughout the series that they went to both primary school and college together.

=== Vince Noir ===
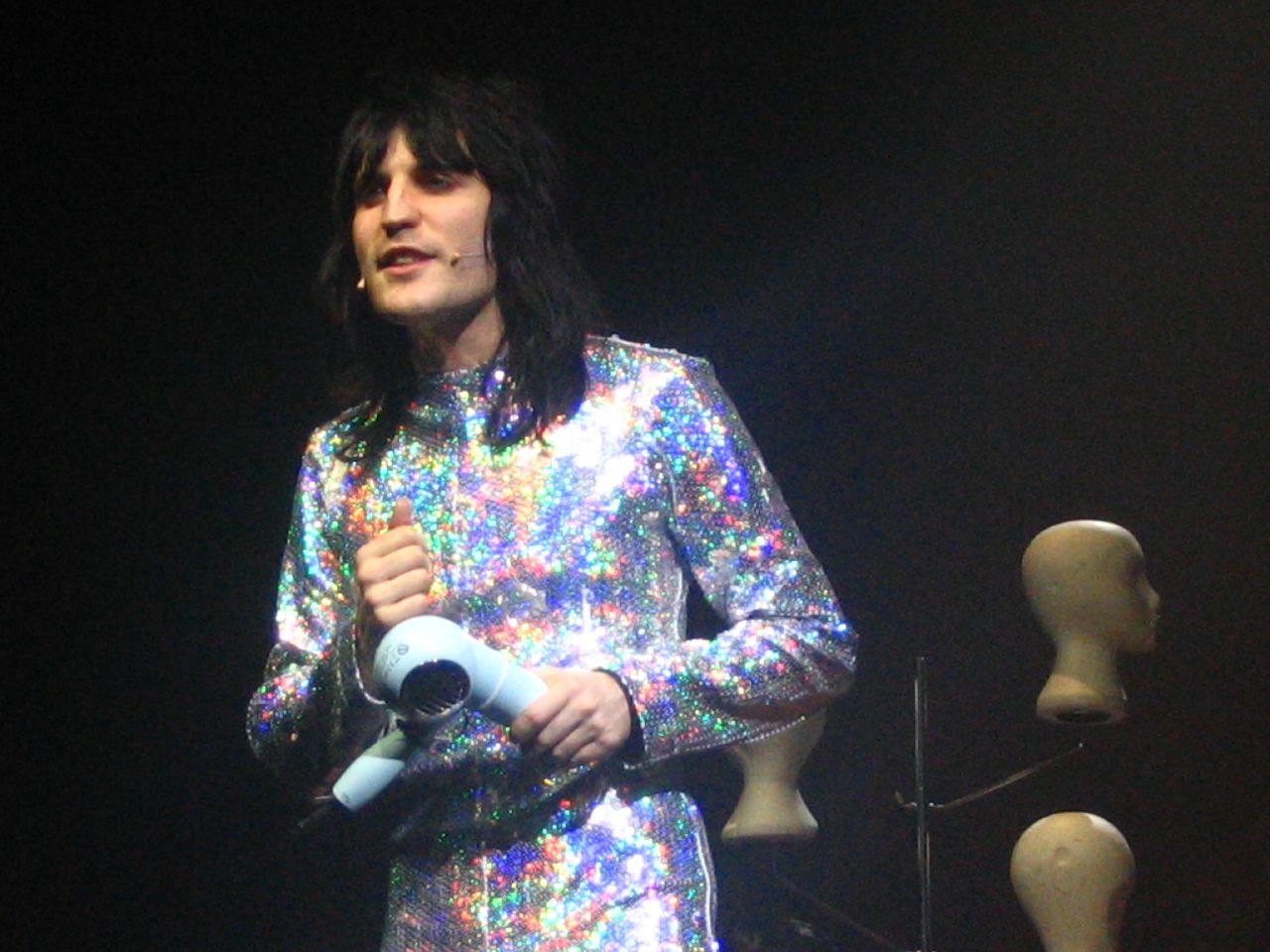
Noel Fielding playing Vince Noir in the Mighty Boosh Live stage show. 2006

Vince Noir was originally created by Noel Fielding for the 1998 stage show The Mighty Boosh. Vince Noir went on to appear in three more stage shows, a radio series and a TV series on BBC Three.

During the course of the stage shows, the radio series and the TV series, it is implied that he was born in the mid-1980s, and spent much of his early life as an orphan, being raised in a forest by Bryan Ferry, and then proceeded to spend the latter part of his childhood in civilisation in England, where he befriended Howard Moon at primary school. He left secondary school in his mid-teens, after being convinced by Howard to work at a local zoo called the Zooniverse, despite mentioning at various points that he took a gap year, achieved at least two BTEC National Diplomas, and went to college. At the Zooniverse, he befriended Naboo the Enigma, Bollo the Ape, and Bob Fossil. He and Howard also went on several adventures whilst working at the Zooniverse, including visiting the Arctic tundra, Limbo, and going on a road trip. In the second series, he was living in a flat in Dalston with Howard, Naboo and Bollo, and playing in a band with Howard. In the third series, Vince and Howard were working in the Nabootique, a small second-hand shop owned by Naboo.

Vince's main personality trait is his relaxed outlook on life, living with perpetually laid back ease, socialising easily with those around him. Vince is often the voice of reason when Howard is being pretentious, although Vince has also been known to have a particularly naïve and somewhat childlike outlook on life. Vince is also shown to be vain and sometimes narcissistic, putting great pride in his appearance and his hair and sometimes neglecting his friend Howard in episodes of self-absorption. Vince usually conforms to specific subcultures which he considers vogue, such as mod, goth, punk, and New Rave,

Though he seems much more confident and secure than Howard, Vince is desperate to be admired as an individual and a trendsetter. In one episode he invites party guests to "bask in the glory of [his] outfit". When a doppelgänger calling himself Lance Dior arises, Vince's optimism crumbles and he becomes insecure.

It was implied in the third series that Vince had bisexual tendencies. Such tendencies are first noted in the episode "Journey to the Centre of the Punk" when his singular brain cell remarks to Howard that he "does swing both ways" but did not really feel "it" with him. Several such references are made in the episode "Party", especially when he kisses Howard passionately to avoid being beheaded by Dennis the head shaman.

Vince is a fan of electro music (including Gary Numan and The Human League), The Rolling Stones, punk rock, and glam rock (including Kiss). Mick Jagger is Vince's hero. He is highly disdainful of jazz, going as far as to claim to be allergic to it. Vince has sung for various bands, including a glam-folk band, an electro band, his and Howard's own band, and a punk band. Vince is also a keen artist having gained a BTEC National Diploma in Art, as well as hair design; he also claims to be a novelist, writing novellas and publishing them independently.

Vince initially claims to have a cockney boxing instructor as an uncle, but it is later revealed that his uncle is actually a French Duke.

Vince also claims he is the "King of the Mods". In the season two episode entitled "Fountain of Youth", Howard Moon claimed to be the same age as Vince but in a later episode in season three, Vince is ten years younger. Vince is often sarcastic towards Howard and sometimes acts out similar to a teenager with a parent, but he always sticks by him in the end.

=== Naboo the Enigma ===
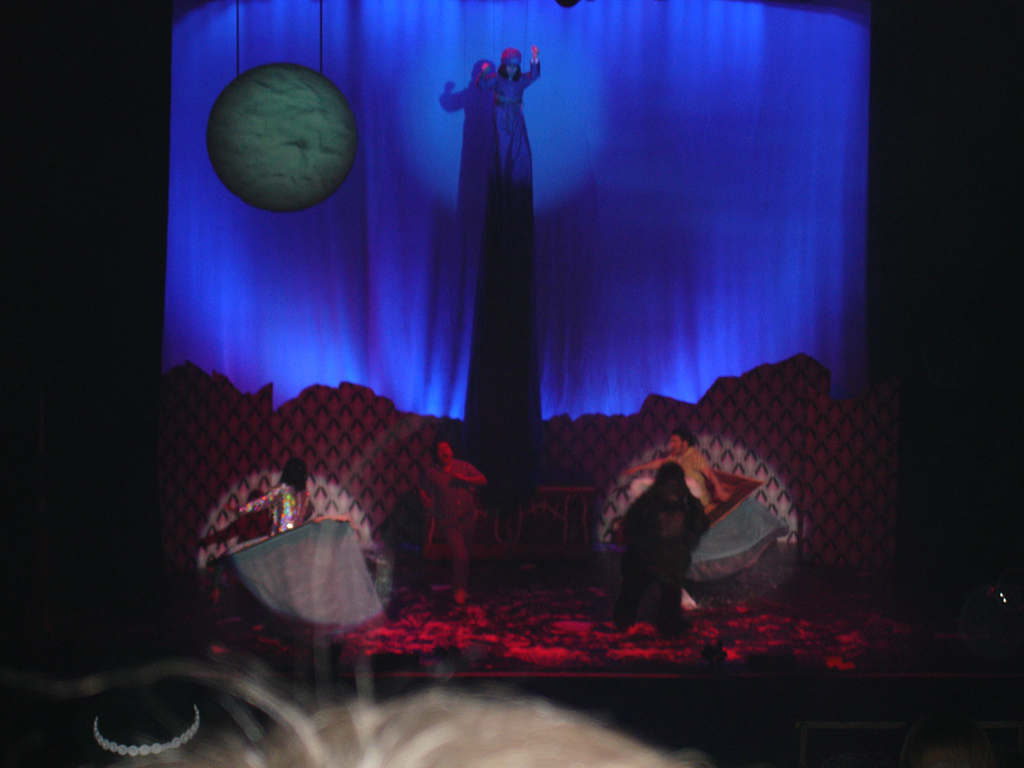
The magic carpet-assisted finale of the Mighty Boosh Live stageshow. From Left to right;Noel Fielding as Vince Noir, Rich Fulcher as Bob Fossil, Michael Fielding as Naboo, Dave Brown as Bollo and Julian Barratt as Howard Moon. Performing in the stageshow the Mighty Boosh Live. March 2006

Naboo Randolph Ropitibopiti the Enigma is portrayed by Michael Fielding. He was created for the 2000 stage show, Autoboosh, and later went on to appear in the pilot and all three series of the TV series, as well as both stage shows.

Naboo is a freelance shaman from the alien planet Xooberon, and has the ability and knowledge of many spells; and is also a recreational drug user and a drug dealer. He is a member of the Board of Shaman, and like many members he is a heavy drinker and rides on a magic carpet.

In 1978, Naboo was mistakenly sent to Earth by the King of Xooberon to protect the amulet of the planet's Fountain of Youth. He became a drug dealer for Rudi and Spider at one point in the 1970s, and eventually went on to work as a kiosk vendor at the Zooniverse. While at the Zooniverse, he would help Howard and Vince out of situations they often found themselves in, typically their explanations being followed by his catchphrase, "I don't believe this!" Naboo left the Zooniverse to become a freelance shaman, moving into a flat in Dalston with Howard, Vince and Bollo, the last now being his familiar spirit. In the episode "Party" of series 3, it is revealed that Naboo has no genitals. By the 2006 stage show, he had opened a second hand shop called the Nabootique (sometimes known as Naboo's Nik-Naks). In the episode "Fountain of Youth" Bollo reveals that Naboo is 406 years old.

=== Bollo ===
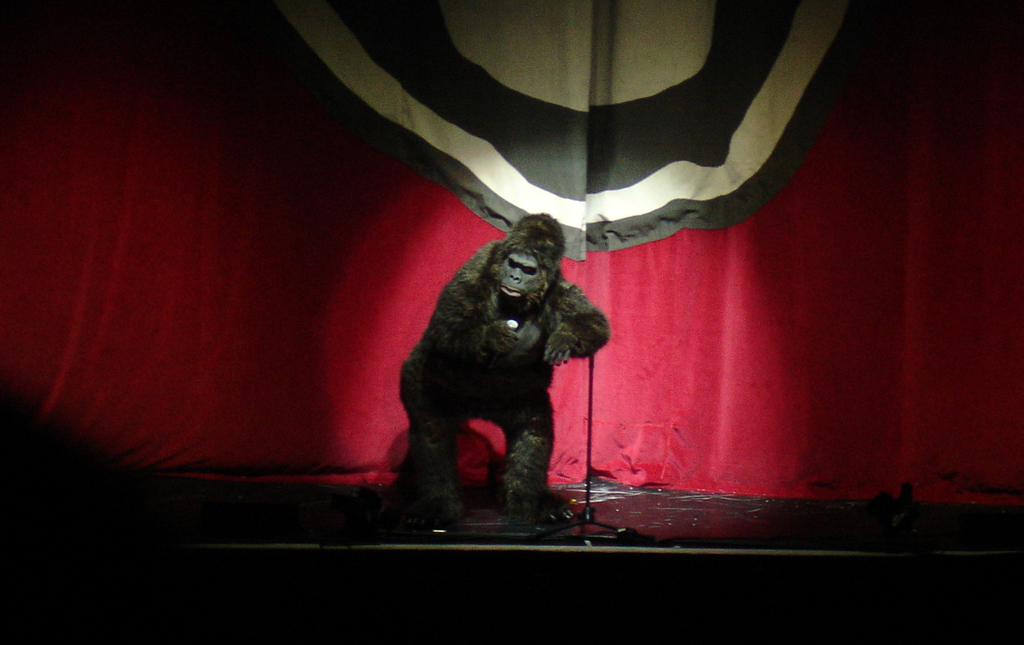
A performance of the stage show The Mighty Boosh Live. Dave Brown as Bollo. 11 March 2006

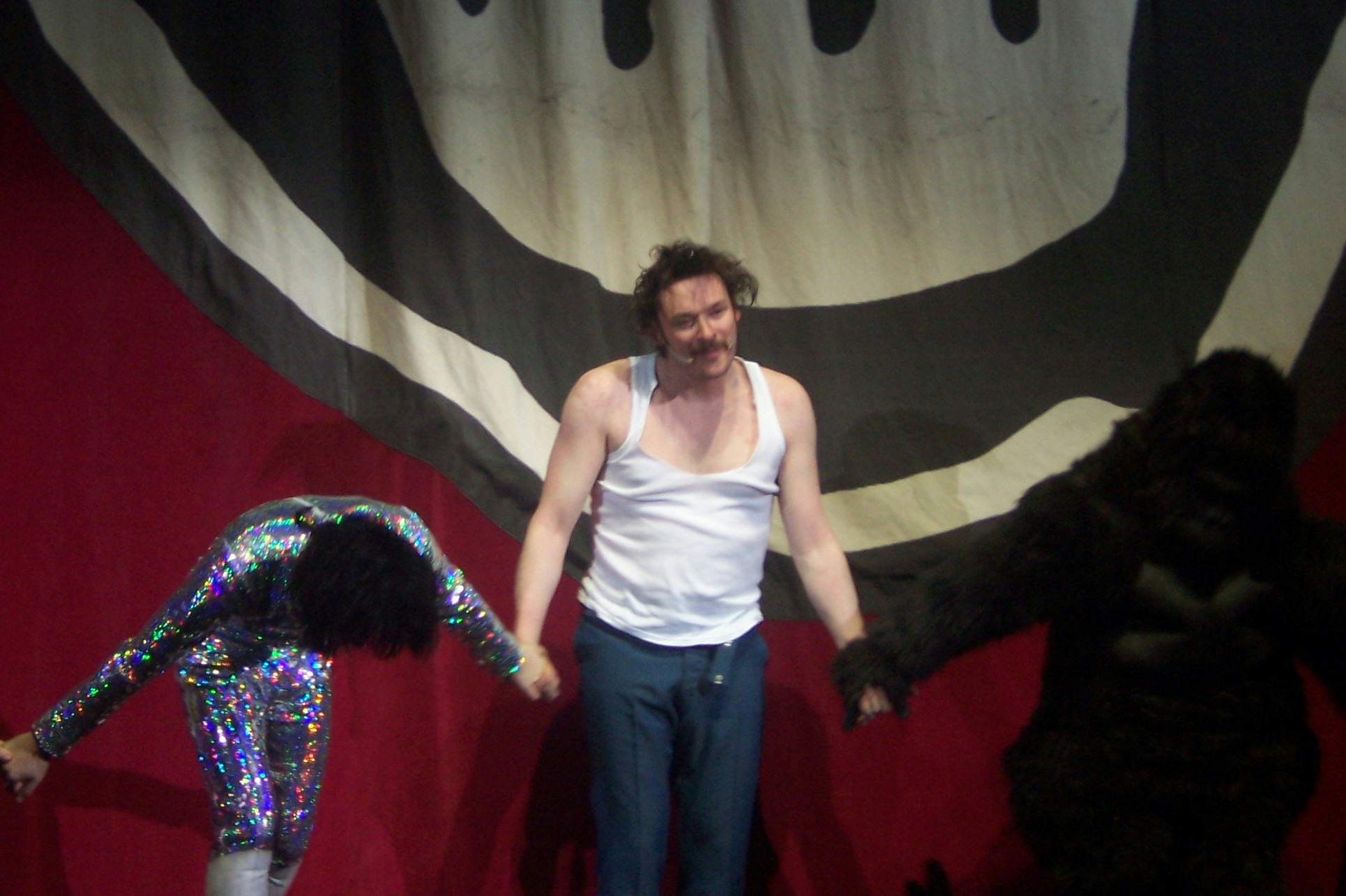
A performance of the stageshow The Mighty Boosh Live at the Brighton Dome. From left to right; Noel Fielding, Julian Barratt, Dave Brown. February 2006

Bollo was originally portrayed by Dave Brown, and also portrayed in the first TV series by Peter Elliot. He first appeared in "Jazz", an episode of the 2001 radio series. He went on to appear in all three series of the TV show and the 2006 stage show.

Bollo is an anthropomorphic gorilla who has been portrayed as inept yet immensely strong. He and Vince are very close, a stark contrast to his relationship with Howard. His catchphrase is "I've got a bad feeling about this...", a reference to Star Wars and said in every show since "The Call of the Yeti". He also DJs at the London nightclub Fabric on Tuesdays.

He first appeared in "Jazz", an episode of a radio series, portrayed by Dave Brown. He next appeared in "Mutants", where he is stolen by Bainbridge to mutate. He then appeared in "Bollo", where he is gravely ill, escaping death when the Grim Reaper takes Howard instead of him. He briefly appears in "Electro", smashing up a guitar in the style of Jimi Hendrix. By the second series he has become Naboo's familiar spirit, and has appeared in every episode since.

=== Bob Fossil ===
Bob Fossil is portrayed by Rich Fulcher. In the radio series Fossil is the ill-tempered owner of Bob Fossil's Funworld, an inept zoo. In the TV series, he is the manager of the Zooniverse and zoo owner Dixon Bainbridge's right-hand man. He is loud and brash and is normally portrayed as Howard and Vince's enemy, often trying to set them up for disaster, although on occasion he has expressed attraction to both of them. On radio, Fossil liked Vince and hated Howard, while on television he generally dislikes both of them, although by season 3 he's friendly to Vince, and his radio persona is somewhat replaced by employer Bainbridge. Fossil has a desperate crush on Bainbridge.

In the TV series Fossil is portrayed as incompetent and bizarrely unaware of common terms; for example he does not know how to dial with a phone and calls a portable tape recorder his "talk box". He is often very childlike and emotional. Though Fossil is chief zoo keeper, he knows nothing about animals, describing the elephant as "the grey leg-face man" and a bear as "the hairy Russian carpet guy". According to the radio series, Fossil also had a traumatic childhood. In the series, Fossil has his own theme song for the zoo: "Nicey nicey zoo zoo, for him and her and me and you!" In the radio series, Bob has a brother called Wilbur who reunites him and his mother, who had believed that Bob died in Vietnam.

Though Fossil and the zoo were absent from the second television series, he makes a brief reappearance at the end of The Nightmare of Milky Joe as the presenter of "The Pie Face Showcase" TV music programme. In this appearance he makes a joke about his wife; she is also mentioned in the radio series ('I got a tiny wife to support'). He returns in the third episode of series 3, "The Power of the Crimp", as the owner of the Velvet Onion club, where Vince and Howard regularly gig. It is revealed that his mother thinks he is in a Vietnamese prisoner of war camp and that he has sent a bundle of sticks to his brother, Donny. Fossil was last seen on the TV show, in the episodes "Party" and "The Chokes".

== Board of Shaman ==
=== Dennis ===
Dennis is portrayed by Julian Barratt. He was originally created for the 2005 TV episode "Nanageddon", and later appeared in three episodes of the third TV series in 2007.

Dennis is the head of the Board of Shaman. He is married to an extreme sports calendar model who tried to seduce Vince in the episode 'Party'. He originally trained Naboo in the ways of the Shaman. He beheaded Lester Corncrake at Howard Moon's birthday party. He is skilled with a sword, and defeats three attackers in the party episode.

=== Saboo ===
Saboo is portrayed by Richard Ayoade. He was originally created for "Nanageddon", an episode of the second series of The Mighty Boosh and later appeared in three episodes of the third series, "Eels", "The Strange Tale of the Crack Fox" and "Party".

Saboo is a shaman, and a member of the Board of Shaman. He is also a DJ. He is close to Kirk but dislikes Tony Harrison, whom he has attempted to kill, and Naboo, whose propensity for getting in trouble with the Board of Shaman often results in Saboo attempting to make an example of him. During his first appearance, he frequently referred to 'the crunch,' criticising other characters for their lack of familiarity with it. He was Maheshwari.

=== Tony Harrison ===
Noel Fielding as Tony Harrison, right, with Richard Ayoade as Saboo

Tony Harrison is portrayed by Noel Fielding. He was originally created for a 2005 episode of the second series of The Mighty Boosh, "Nanageddon", and later returned for three episodes of the third series.

Tony Harrison is a disembodied pink head, with eight or so tentacle-like appendages sprouting from his neck, and a coarse, nasal East London brogue. He is a shaman, and member of the Board of Shaman. Tony is barely mobile within the show, but is frequently outraged at suggestions that this is the case. Tony is married, and makes frequent reference to Mrs Harrison who, as yet, has not been seen on the show. Tony's catchphrase, "This is an outrage!" has been spoken by him during every appearance in the show. He is an ardent fan of Fleetwood Mac, to the extent of suggesting playing the album Tusk in its entirety while DJing Howard's birthday party with Saboo.

Tony first appeared, alongside the rest of the Board of Shaman, in the 2005 TV episode "Nanageddon", where he and fellow Shaman Saboo are given the task of finding and exorcising the powerful demon Nanatoo, which ends in Saboo ejecting him from his magic carpet out of annoyance. He next appears in the 2007 TV episode, "Eels", accompanying the other Shaman on Dennis's stag weekend. He then appears briefly in the 2007 TV episode, "The Strange Tale of The Crack Fox" being Naboo's executioner for the crime of giving a malevolent fox access to shaman juice. His latest appearance was in the 2007 episode "Party" where he and Saboo DJ'd at Howard's birthday party.

=== Kirk ===
Kirk is portrayed by Kirk Gaitskell-Kendrick. He is a nephew of Noel Fielding's former girlfriend Dee Plume, although Noel referred to Kirk as his own nephew. He first appeared in the 2005 episode, "Nanageddon", and later appeared in three 2007 episodes.

Kirk is a child Shaman, and a member of the Board of Shaman. Kirk is renowned by the other members of the Board of Shaman for having the greatest capacity for taking drugs. A deleted scene from "Nanageddon" reveals that Saboo trained Kirk in the ways of the Shaman.

== Other recurring characters ==
=== Dixon Bainbridge ===
Dixon Bainbridge was portrayed by Richard Ayoade in the pilot episode, and by Matt Berry throughout the first series. He originally appeared in the pilot and several episodes of the first series of the TV show, and in the 2006 stage show, The Mighty Boosh.

Bainbridge is the owner of the Zooniverse, as well as being an admired adventurer. Bob Fossil is deeply in love with Bainbridge, which often results in Bainbridge beating him up.

His first appearance is in the pilot episode of the TV series, portrayed by Richard Ayoade. He then appears in "Mutants", where he steals and mutilates the various animals and keepers of the Zooniverse. He next appears in "Tundra", a remake of the original pilot episode. He inspires Howard and Vince to travel to the Arctic Tundra and find the Egg of Mantumbi, which Bainbridge later finds himself, escaping the Black Frost by using the heat stored in his own moustache. Bainbridge later tries to sell the Zooniverse to build a road over it in "Jungle"; a plan which is later averted by Howard and Vince. Bainbridge finally appears in "Charlie", where he steals credit for Vince's work as a novelist, causing Charlie, the subject of Vince's novels, to appear and attack Bainbridge and his publisher. He was last seen delivering a box to the Nabootique.

It was revealed in The Mighty Book of Boosh that Bainbridge had been knighted in a story that involved Bainbridge rescuing his kidnapped wife in Brazil.

=== Lester Corncrake ===
Lester Corncrake is portrayed by Rich Fulcher. He appeared in several episodes of the third series of the TV show.

Lester Corncrake is a blind vinyl doctor who is close friends with Howard Moon, and also an avid jazz fan. He mistakenly believes he is black.

Lester first appeared in the 2007 episode, "Journey to the Centre of Punk" in which he accompanies Howard on his microscopic journey inside Vince to eliminate the jazz virus he has ingested. He next appears briefly in the 2007 episode "The Power of the Crimp", disowning Howard after his and Vince's poor performance at a gig at the Velvet Onion where they were sabotaged by their new rivals, the Flighty Zeus. His last appearance to date was in the 2007 episode, "Party", where he is a guest at Howard's birthday, where he is mistakenly beheaded by Dennis, then raped by Tony Harrison. He is briefly mentioned in the third series finale.

=== Rudi van DiSarzio ===
Rudi van DiSarzio is portrayed by Rich Fulcher and Julian Barratt. He was originally created for the 1998 stage show, The Mighty Boosh, and also appeared in an out-take for the "Jazz" episode of the 2001 radio series The Boosh, both portrayed by Rich Fulcher. He was then portrayed by Julian Barratt in the 2004 episode "Jungle", and the 2005 episode "The Priest and the Beast" of the TV series. He last appeared in the 2006 stage show, Boosh Live.

Rudi is a High Priest of the Order of the Psychedelic Monks. He and Spider Dijon quarrel often, but are very close despite having starkly different personalities. Rudi's behaviour and attitude is extremely puritanical; he thinks of alcohol and women as "distractions" in stark contrast to the animalistic nature of Spider Dijon, and even went so far as to say that he considered all women "strange and evil". Whenever he is asked for his name, Rudi's initial response will often be "I go by many names..." followed by a list of odd names. Some of his many names include "Shatoon, Bringer of Corn", "Mickey Nine, The Dreamweaver", "Photoshop", "Trenu, The Boiler", "Marjorie Keek", "Mystery Man", "The Shadow Dweller", "Diviner of Mysteries", "Rudi the Prudey", "Miraculous Mark", "Domino, the Bounty Hunter", "Clive" and "Cillit Bang", He is often called "Peppercorn" by the Dutch. A similar character, Howard's uncle Pedro, appears in the radio episode "Tundra", also claiming to go by many names.

In Jungle and some other appearances he has a tiny (puppet) body and he appears attached to a mobile backdrop; in most appearances he is of normal size and wears a long purple robe. In all of his appearances on stage or TV, Rudy has large buck teeth, browned skin and a large afro haircut with a door in it, called the door of Kukundu, that can open to take people on bizarre psychedelic trips. He claims to have earned his door by becoming spiritually enlightened as a monk.

=== Mrs Gideon ===
Mrs Gideon is portrayed by Victoria Wicks. She was mentioned briefly in The Boosh as Howard's band partner and lover, until the smooth talking Rudy Mancheigo (a precursor to the character of Rudi van DiSanio) wooed her with empty wisdoms.

Mrs Gideon was the Head of Reptiles at the Zooniverse in the first series of the TV show. She was the chief love interest of Howard in Series 1 but as she could not remember his face, his love went unrequited. She was, however, interested in Vince, admiring his paintings, remarking that Vince's portrait of Howard (a featureless face atop a Zooniverse uniform) looked just like him, and going to Vince when her snake was stolen by Bainbridge, much to Howard's disgust and envy.

=== Old Gregg ===
Old Gregg is portrayed by Noel Fielding. He was created for "The Legend of Old Gregg", a 2005 episode of the TV series. He later went on to appear in the 2006 stage show, The Mighty Boosh.

Old Gregg is an intersex merman who occasionally refers to his vagina, which emits a blinding light that "makes you feel tingly", as his "mangina". He inhabits a cave below the lake in a village called Black Lake. Old Gregg is in love with Howard Moon; singing a song with him entitled "Love Games", chronicling his obsession and Howard's reluctance, and later proposing to Howard. A deleted scene from "The Legend of Old Gregg" documents many rumours about Old Gregg—which number 29, the "same number of sailors in Nantucket"—including his cannibalistic nature, and his age at over 1,200 years old. It is also noted that he once fainted after reading a pelican's mind, painted his pubic hairs yellow so he could "read in the bed", and that when he breaks wind people in Africa go "Haaaah". Before meeting Faye, Old Gregg was obsessed with Slash, the former Guns N' Roses guitarist, to the point of kidnapping him. It was mentioned that it ended badly, involving Gregg being very upset and Slash plummeting from a helicopter down 1,000 feet onto some sharp rocks. He also claims that he said, "You should build a Velvet Revolver and go and live in it."—Velvet Revolver being Slash's new band.

Old Gregg is first seen in the 2005 episode, "The Legend of Old Gregg" in which he meets and falls in love with Howard, who is then rescued by Vince. Old Gregg then joins Howard in the 2006 stage show, after tracking him down and having himself delivered in a box, where they sing a rendition of "Love Games" and are later seen kissing. Old Gregg last appeared in a deleted scene from the 2007 episode, "Party", disguised as a woman who has taken a liking to Howard.

=== The Hitcher ===
Noel Fielding as The Hitcher in series 3 of the TV show

The Hitcher is portrayed by Noel Fielding. He was created for the 1999 stage show Autoboosh, and later appeared in the 2001 radio series, four episodes of the television series, and the 2006 stage show, The Mighty Boosh, in which he is the main antagonist, killing all the main characters at one point.

The Hitcher is an old cockney man with long grey hair, green skin, a large Polo mint over his left eye, a top hat and black and red clothing. He is evil, threatening to kill Howard and Vince whenever he meets them, and killing the whole cast in the stage show. His real name is Baboo Yagu, but he is almost always referred to as The Hitcher. He is also a proponent of jazz fusion, especially proficient at playing slap bass.

The Hitcher has a confused history; he states in "The Hitcher" that as a child his parents were ashamed of his small thumb (prompting him to seek out the Hornet Shaman). However, in "Eels" he reveals that Elsie, proprietor of the Pie and Mash Shop, gave him free eels "on account of [him] being an orphan n' that" (Eels). In The Mighty Book of Boosh, it is stated The Hitcher trained a man called Ian in the ways of a Cockney. Ian later goes on to become Jack the Ripper, and the Hitcher murders him as punishment for 'slashing Women'.

The Hitcher is sometimes accompanied by two short, rotund henchmen called the Piper Twins. The Piper Twins are dressed similarly to the Hitcher, with similar Polo mint eyes, but wear bowler hats and have long red moustaches, made from strawberry bootlaces. They are portrayed by Rich Fulcher and Dave Brown

The Hitcher's first appearance was in Autoboosh, where he encounters Howard and Vince, trapping them in a box and then rapping about it. This plot was the template for a 2001 radio episode and a 2004 television episode, both titled "Hitcher".

In the television episode, he is proprietor of the "Zoo for Animal Offenders". He later appears in the 2005 television episode, "Fountain of Youth", where he plans to use the fountain of youth's magical qualities for himself with the motive to rule the universe. Next he appeared in the episode "The Nightmare of Milky Joe" as one of the coconut people. He then appeared in the 2006 stage show, The Mighty Boosh, which contained elements of both Autoboosh and the 1999 stage show, Arctic Boosh. His latest appearance was in the 2007 television episode, "Eels", in which he attempts to run a protection racket on The Nabootique.

The Hitcher' appearance changes somewhat between appearances. In the first-series episode "The Hitcher" he has an abnormally large thumb, as well as nose and chin. He explains his huge thumb as stemming from his visiting a Hornet Shaman in the bin of a primary school and asking him to enlarge his thumb by stinging it repeatedly. In the second series his thumb is normally sized. In the third series he has a normal chin and nose. As he melted at the end of prior appearance while washing in the Fountain of Youth, this last change of appearance could stem from being de-aged.

In commenting on his eponymous appearance in series one, Fielding said that the Hitcher is based on his grandfather crossed with the character Fagin from the play Oliver Twist.

=== The Spirit of Jazz/Howlin' Jimmy Jefferson ===
The Spirit of Jazz as he appears in Electro

The Spirit of Jazz/Howlin' Jimmy Jefferson is portrayed by Noel Fielding. He appears in three separate forms over the course of the series. In the series 3 episode, Journey to the Centre of Punk, he is described as having been a famous jazz musician that lived by the swamps of Mississippi. When he was alive he had black and white skin, red eyes and wore a white suit and top hat. When he discovered he was dying of a "strange swamp fever" he decided to make one final record called Voodoo Scat and mixed it with a drop of his own blood.

The series 1 episode "Electro" is the first appearance of Howlin' Jimmy Jefferson. His ghost is featured in this episode and referred to as the Spirit of Jazz. In this form he looks the same as he did when he was alive but now has a number of supernatural powers and uses them to possess people such as Howard. Howard ignorantly made a deal with him years ago, which the spirit claimed would make Howard one of the greatest jazz musicians of all time (in Yorkshire).

Howard later obtains the voodoo scat record that Howlin' Jimmy made and Vince eats a piece of it which causes one of Howlin' Jimmy's blood cells (referred to as the jazz cell) to try and take over Vince's body. Howard along with Lester Corncrake shrink down and enters Vince's body in an attempt to defeat the jazz cell but end up bringing it out of Vince's body with them and making it much larger. It is eventually defeated by an infected safety pin (previously used by Sid Vicious) and walks away complaining, falling over just outside the door of the Nabootique.

In June 2020, Netflix removed The Mighty Boosh from distribution because of concerns that the Spirit of Jazz might be considered a blackface performance.

=== The Moon ===
The Moon is portrayed by Noel Fielding with his face covered in shaving foam. He was originally created for Fielding's 2002 stand-up show Voodoo Hedgehog at the Edinburgh Festival. He later appeared in all episodes of series two and three of The Mighty Boosh, and in the 2006 and 2008 live shows. The Moon always appears to be simple-mindedly cheerful and tells anecdotes which act as bookends between sketches. He has a poor grasp of English, and is described by Tony Harrison as "an alabaster retard".

The Moon made a cameo appearance in the first episode of Noel Fielding's Luxury Comedy, and in June 2013 he made an appearance in a video message at Channel 4's Comedy Gala.

=== Tommy Nookah ===
Tommy Nookah was originally portrayed by Richard Ayoade. He appeared in the radio episode "Jungle" and later in revised form during the first series of the TV show, where he was played by Rich Fulcher rather than Ayoade. In both versions he is the previous owner of the zoo where Howard and Vince work; he is assumed by many to be dead. Howard sees him as an idol and mentor. Howard later enters the jungle room of the zoo to find Tommy. In the TV version Tommy has subsisted for years on nothing but cheese, and as a result his head has turned into cheese. Tommy considers himself King of the Rockers, and flies into a rage when confronted by mods.

=== The Parka People ===
The Parka People wear parkas that completely obscure their features. They appear in the "Tundra" storyline and the third-series episode "Party". By looking deep into the parka, one can see one's deepest desire. The Parka People guard the Egg of Mantumbi. One of the Parka people appears in the stage show, played by Noel Fielding.

=== Leroy ===
Leroy is a recurring character who only appears on screen once in the television series when Vince creates a band which was a glam rock/folk fusion in episode 7 of series 1, "Electro". He is said to have helped Howard edit the show's script in the series 1 episode "Tundra", cutting out the scene where Vince has the legs of a ram. Leroy also goes on secret spy skiing missions in the Alps as is mentioned in the series 3 episode "Eels". He is mentioned in the episode "Electro" as having tried to form a glam-folk-rock band with Vince. He is played by Olly Ralfe in this short scene. He is also referred to briefly in episode 1 of season 1 Killeroo when Vince states that Leroy had told him earlier he saw Howard dancing for Fossil in the moonlight in "little blue pants" and is later referenced in "The Ape of Death" talking to Vince on a cellphone when Howard is "haunting" him.
