= Mindhorn =

2016 British comedy film by Sean Foley

- British release poster
- Directed by: Sean Foley
- Written by: Julian Barratt; Simon Farnaby
- Produced by: Jack Arbuthnott; Laura Hastings-Smith
- Starring: Julian Barratt; Simon Farnaby; Essie Davis; Steve Coogan; Richard McCabe; Andrea Riseborough; Russell Tovey; Robin Morrissey; David Schofield; Harriet Walter; Jessica Barden; Simon Callow; Nicholas Farrell; Tony Way; Kenneth Branagh (uncredited)
- Cinematography: David Luther
- Edited by: Mark Everson
- Music by: Keefus Ciancia; David Holmes
- Production companies: Isle of Man Film; Pinewood Pictures; BBC Films; British Film Institute; Scott Free Productions; Baby Cow Productions
- Distributed by: Netflix (International); StudioCanal (United Kingdom)
- Release dates: 9 October 2016 (London Film Festival); 5 May 2017
- Running time: 89 minutes
- Country: United Kingdom
- Language: English

Mindhorn is a 2016 British independent comedy film directed by Sean Foley, written by Julian Barratt and Simon Farnaby, and executive produced by Steve Coogan and Ridley Scott. It stars Barratt, Farnaby, Essie Davis, Russell Tovey and Andrea Riseborough, with cameo appearances by Kenneth Branagh and Simon Callow as themselves. Barratt plays Richard Thorncroft, a faded television actor drawn into negotiations with a criminal who believes his character Detective Mindhorn is real.

== Plot ==
Richard Thorncroft is a former television actor, known for playing Detective Bruce Mindhorn, a detective with a cybernetic eye that enables him to see truth (described as an optical lie detector), on the 1980s TV show Mindhorn. Twenty-five years later, on the Isle of Man, where the series was filmed, police hunt the escaped lunatic Paul Melly, who's wanted for murder. Melly says he will only speak to Detective Mindhorn, believing Mindhorn is real.

Richard is now washed up, making a living advertising embarrassing products. Hoping to boost his career, he returns to help the case, irritating the local police with his arrogance. Melly's scheduled call to the police station leads to a meeting, ending in Melly's arrest. Richard sets out to reconnect with his Mindhorn co-star and ex, Patricia, discovering she lives with his former stuntman Clive, and daughter Jasmine.

Another of his Mindhorn co-stars, Pete Eastman, now stars in a successful spin-off series. Pete invites Richard around with the promise of a DVD release of Mindhorn, only to mock him. Dejected, Richard parties with his former manager Moncrieff, is detained after a night of drunkenness and cocaine-snorting, and dropped by his agent.

Waiting for his ferry home, Richard opens fan mail, and realises that it's from Melly, including a videotape showing the mayor committing the murder. Richard shows the tape to Moncrieff, who proposes using it to blackmail the mayor. He refuses to give the tape back, but appears to concede after a brief altercation. Richard meets Melly and the police, but discovers Moncrieff has swapped the tape. Moncrieff independently tries to blackmail the mayor but is killed by DS Baines, the mayor's niece and part of the conspiracy.

Melly and Richard escape to Melly's secret lair, filled with Mindhorn merchandise and homemade espionage equipment. Melly equips him with an extensive Mindhorn outfit, explaining he has a copy of the tape in the classic car used in Mindhorn. They escape Baines when Melly throws defective Mindhorn-brand truth powder in her face.

At Patricia and Clive's, Richard finds the car is in the local parade. Patricia finds letters to her from Richard that Clive hid from her. Richard, Melly and Patricia go to get the car from the parade, and are pursued by DS Baines to the beach. Richard finds the "copy" of the tape is just a plasticine model Melly made. Melly is hit by a bullet and appears to die. Baines arrives, and appears to kill Patricia and injure Richard. Richard records Baines' confession on a Mindhorn recorder belt that Melly had him wear.

The police arrive and Richard and Pat get up, having tricked Baines into using a gun with blanks. They prove Baines' and the mayor's roles in the murders with the tape. Richard then rescues Jasmine from Baines as she fires at him, with a gun he believes is also full of blanks. When told that he actually just narrowly dodged several real bullets, Richard faints. After recovering, Richard and Patricia get back together, Baines and the mayor are jailed, and Melly is found alive in his lair.

== Cast ==
- Julian Barratt as Richard Thorncroft
- Simon Farnaby as Clive Parnevik, Richard's stunt double on Mindhorn and later Patricia's lover
- Essie Davis as Patricia Deville
- Steve Coogan as Peter Eastman
- Richard McCabe as Jeffrey Moncrieff, Richard's former manager
- Andrea Riseborough as Detective Sergeant Elena Baines
- Russell Tovey as Paul Melly
- Robin Morrissey as PC Green
- David Schofield as Chief Inspector Derek Newsome
- Harriet Walter as Richard's agent
- Jessica Barden as Jasmine, Patricia's twenty-year-old daughter
- Simon Callow as himself
- Nicholas Farrell as the Mayor of the Isle of Man
- Tony Way as dad with newspaper
- Kenneth Branagh as himself (uncredited)

== Release ==
Mindhorn went on general release in the UK on 5 May 2017, and was screened at the Belfast Film Festival. Netflix acquired the rights to broadcast in all territories outside of the UK between 12 May 2017 and May 2023. The film was nominated for a best debut screenwriter award by the British Independent Film Awards in 2017.

== Reception ==
On Rotten Tomatoes the film has an approval rating of 92% based on reviews from 48 critics. The site's consensus was, "Led by a committed performance from Julian Barratt, Mindhorn offers audiences a laugh-out-loud comedy whose sublime silliness is enhanced by its more thoughtful moments."
