= Robin Morrissey =

British screen and theatre actor

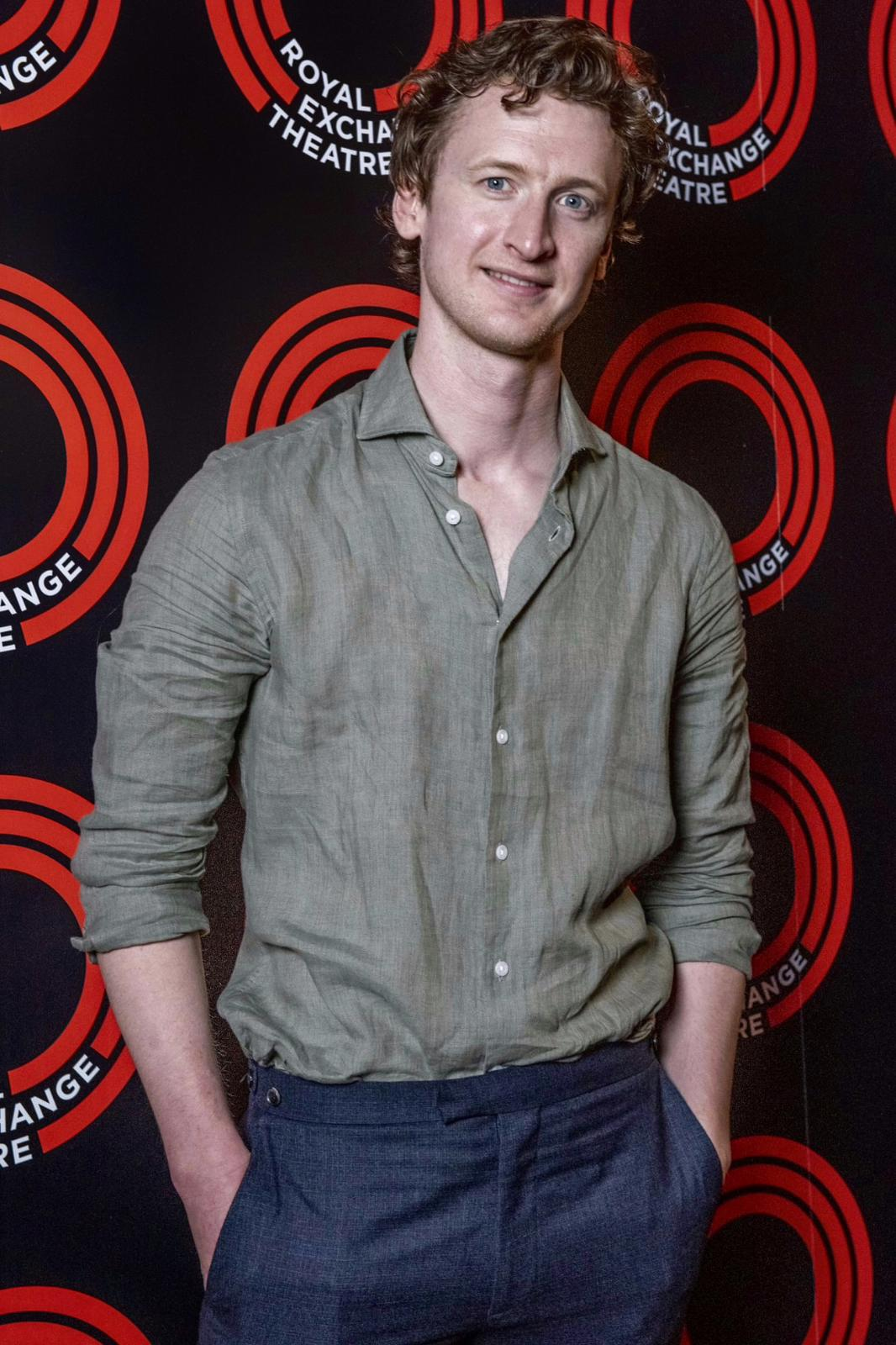
- Morrissey in 2024
- Born: 21 June 1989 (age 37); Liverpool, England
- Citizenship: United Kingdom
- Education: RADA
- Occupation: Actor
- Years active: 2012–present
- Notable work: Cloud Atlas (2012); Mindhorn (2016); Apple Tree Yard (2017)

Robin Morrissey (born 21 June 1989) is a British screen and theatre actor. He is known for his roles in the films Cloud Atlas (2012), and Mindhorn (2016). He also has an extensive stage career.

== Early life and education ==
Morrissey attended Merchant Taylors' Boys' School, Crosby. In 2011 Morrissey graduated with an acting BA degree from the Royal Academy of Dramatic Art. His uncle is David Morrissey, an English actor and filmmaker.

== Career ==
In 2012, Morrissey made his professional debut playing Young Cavendish in the fantasy film Cloud Atlas directed by the Wachowskis and Tom Tykwer. In the same year, he played Bruno in the comedy horror film Love Bite.

In 2013, Morrissey starred as the young Paul O'Grady in the comedy-drama Little Crackers.

Morrissey made his stage debut at the Royal Exchange in Manchester in 2013. He played Tom in the First World War play The Accrington Pals by Peter Whelan. Dominic Cavendish of The Daily Telegraph described him as "the picture of innocence as the dreamy Tom". In 2014, Morrissey played Valentine in Twelfth Night in the opening production of the new Liverpool Everyman Theatre, Charles Bentham in Juno and the Paycock at the Bristol Old Vic, and Ben Ballard in Sex and the Three Day Week at the Liverpool Playhouse.

In 2016, Morrissey continued his film career playing PC Green, in the independent comedy film, Mindhorn.

Morrissey starred as Khlestakov in The Government Inspector for Ramps on the Moon in 2016. The production was nominated for an Olivier Award for outstanding achievement by an affiliate theatre. Reviewing the production for The Guardian, Alfred Hickling wrote that Morrissey played the man mistaken for a government official with "an expression that suggests he can scarcely believe his luck".

In 2017, he played Jamie in the BBC four-part series Apple Tree Yard alongside Emily Watson. He also played the title role of Gabriel in the UK Tour of Moira Buffini's WWII drama, Gabriel, alongside Paul McGann. In The Daily Telegraph, Cavendish wrote that McGann had to "cede his erstwhile heart-throb status to fine, upstanding newcomer Robin Morrissey as Gabriel".

In 2018, Morrissey guest starred as Will Hurran, the nephew of Jimmi Clay (Adrian Lewis Morgan), in fourteen episodes of Doctors on the BBC.

In 2019, Morrissey played Leo in the UK tour of Edmond de Bergerac.

He has played Fred Thompson in The Tower since 2021.

In 2024, Morrissey played Felix in Coronation Street. He also starred as Jack Worthing in The Importance of Being Earnest at the Royal Exchange, Manchester. Chris Bartlett of The Stage praised his "assured turn as the duplicitous Jack".

In 2025, Morrissey starred as Snowball in Animal Farm for Stratford East and Leeds Playhouse. The production was nominated for an Olivier Award for Best New Production in Affiliate Theatre. WhatsOnStage described him as "brilliant as the pigs' visionary, Snowball; a strong, charismatic leader". He also appeared as Scott Beddows in Casualty.

In 2026, Morrissey played Macbeth in Macbeth at Storyhouse, Chester, with reviewers labelling his performance "a masterclass in acting". He also played the lead role of Phil in Brassed Off at Leeds Playhouse, where he was praised for his depiction of depression and mental trauma in the face of financial trouble. WhatsOnStage drew comparisons with the Yosser Hughes breakdown from Boys from the Blackstuff: "His divided loyalties are agonising at times, especially in his crazy speech as a clown at a children's party, his loss of self-respect taking us back to Yosser Hughes." He made a guest appearance as Tony in season 3 of the ITV comedy G'wed.

Later in 2026, Morrissey played Luke Sanderson in Stef Smith's stage adaptation of Shirley Jackson's The Haunting of Hill House on a UK tour that included Richmond Theatre and Theatr Clwyd. Lucinda Everett of The Guardian commended his performance as being "cocksure yet brittle".

== Filmography ==
=== Film ===
Year	Title	Role
2012	Cloud Atlas	Young Cavendish
2012	Love Bite	Bruno
2017	Mindhorn	PC Green

=== Television ===
Year	Title	Role
2012	Holby City	Tom Ross
2013	Little Crackers	Paul O'Grady
2017	Apple Tree Yard	Jamie
2018	Doctors	Will Hurran
2020	Home	Ian
2021	The Tower	PS Fred Thomson
2024	Coronation Street	Felix
2025	Casualty	Scott Beddows
2026	G'wed	Tony

=== Theatre ===
Year	Title	Role	Theatre	Director
2013	The Accrington Pals	Tom	Manchester Royal Exchange	James Dacre
2014	Twelfth Night	Valentine	Liverpool Everyman	Gemma Bodinetz
2014	Juno and the Paycock	Charles Bentham	Bristol Old Vic	Gemma Bodinetz
2015	Sex and the Three Day Week	Ben Ballard	Liverpool Playhouse	Serdar Bilis
2016	The Government Inspector	Khlestakov	Birmingham Repertory Theatre	Roxana Silbert
2017	Gabriel	Gabriel	UK Tour	Kate McGregor
2019	Edmond de Bergerac	Leo	Birmingham Rep / UK Tour	Roxana Silbert
2022	Deep Blue	Matt	Liverpool Everyman	Nicole Behan
2023	Richard III	Rivers	Rose Theatre Kingston	Adjoa Andoh
2024	The Importance of Being Earnest	Jack Worthing	Manchester Royal Exchange	Josh Roche
2025	Animal Farm	Snowball	Leeds Playhouse	Amy Leach
2026	Macbeth	Macbeth	Storyhouse, Chester	Jamie Sophia Fletcher
2026	Brassed Off	Phil	Leeds Playhouse	Amy Leach
2026	The Haunting of Hill House	Luke Sanderson	Theatr Clwyd / UK Tour	Martin Constantine
