= Love Bite =

2012 film by Andy De Emmony

- Theatrical release poster
- Directed by: Andy De Emmony
- Screenplay by: Cris Cole; Ronan Blaney
- Produced by: Joni Levin
- Starring: Jessica Szohr; Robin Morrissey; Ed Speleers; Luke Pasqualino; Daniel Kendrick; Adam Leese; Kierston Wareing; Rosie Sansom; Robert Pugh; Timothy Spall
- Cinematography: Tat Radcliffe
- Edited by: Matt Platts-Mills
- Music by: Burkhard Dallwitz
- Production companies: WestEnd Films; Ecosse Films; Notting Hill Films; Scope Pictures
- Distributed by: Entertainment Film Distributors
- Release date: 9 November 2012 (United Kingdom)
- Running time: 87 minutes
- Country: United Kingdom
- Language: English
- Budget: £2.5 million
- Box office: $238,177

Love Bite is a 2012 British comedy horror film directed by Andy De Emmony, based on a screenplay by Cris Cole and Ronan Blaney. The film revolves around a mysterious traveller girl who is suspected of being a werewolf. It stars Jessica Szohr, Ed Speleers, Luke Pasqualino and Timothy Spall. It was released on 9 November 2012.

== Synopsis ==
School is over and summer has begun in the dead-end seaside town of Rainmouth. While Jamie's friends seem to be happy working in the local pie factory by day and looking for sex by night, Jamie is bored out of his mind, running his pot-head mother's B&B. He's desperate to get out of there. But when he meets American traveler Juliana at a party, he's smitten - the world is not so small after all. But soon after Juliana's arrival, strange things start happening. One of the local teens goes missing at a party. Then, another. Jamie is warned by an enigmatic stranger that a werewolf is in town - and preying solely on virgin flesh! The only way to be safe seems to be to pop your cherry. As the locals are picked off one by one, the boys fear that a werewolf is indeed after them. And for all their talk, it turns out none of them have ever had sex before... Pretty soon, everyone is dying to get laid.

== Cast ==
- Jessica Szohr as Juliana
- Ed Speleers as Jamie
- Timothy Spall as Sid
- Luke Pasqualino as Kevin
- Kierston Wareing as Natalie
- Imogen Toner as Mandy
- Robert Pugh as Sergeant Rooney
- Paul Birchard as Reverend Lynch
- Adam Leese as Malik
- Ben Keaton as Father John
- Robin Morrissey as Bruno
- Daniel Kendrick as Spike
- Joy McAvoy as Berit

== Production ==
Shooting for Love Bite took place in Clacton-on-Sea, Essex, Glasgow, Largs, Millport, Cumbrae and near North Berwick, East Lothian. Filming started on 15 September 2011.

The film wrapped on 14 November 2011, after a five-week shoot in Scotland.

== Design ==
=== Creature effects ===
Matt Wavish, writing for the Horror Cult Films website and giving the movie only 2.5 stars out of 10 in his review, was one of few reviewers who admired the werewolf effects: "When the werewolf does finally appear, it is quite cool. Clever lighting and camera angles hide the films low budget, and enable the rather large monster to actually look impressive for most of the time."

Reviewer Karl De Mesa mourned the underabundance of werewolf sightings: "when we do see the beast the darn CGI makes it look like this one might just fall into the B-movie bin."

Reviewer Ellis Whitehouse expressed some outrage: "The wolf itself is a disgustingly ugly piece of CGI work, with it changing size and shape as the scenes progress, one minute it'll be twice the size a human with the fattest head in existence, next it'll be a puny mongrel cowering in front of a car on the road."

== Marketing ==
De Emmony shopped Love Bite at the American Film Market 2011 event, allegedly hoping to appeal to the audience of The Inbetweeners Movie.

The movie's tagline is "Dying...to get laid." Two official trailers were released.

== Release ==
The film was released on 9 November 2012.

== Reception ==
Movie reviews were mixed. Michael Juvinall of the Horror Society liked it - "a clever mix of horror and humor" - with the proviso, "We don't see too much of the werewolf in the film and what we do see is CGI, which was a little disappointing for me." A reviewer for GMA News Online was also mostly positive: "Add a generous tone of comedy to this naughty UK horror movie and what you've got are well-sketched characters and great plot potential that, unfortunately, just drags in the execution. There's a lot of side stories here that never get developed and left unresolved like stray threads. For all its faults though, Love Bite is as entertaining as its mix of supernatural and sex promises. Credit the young actors for this. There's genuine chemistry between Szohr and Speleers..."

Horrornews.net reviewer Lizzie Duncan "found none of the main characters that likeable, and this is the key reason why the entire thing seemed to drag on (despite being a relatively short film). ... The whole film is rather vile and crude..." Ellis Whitehouse, giving 1 out of 10 points, begins by referencing Shaun of the Dead and Zombieland and asks, "Is Love Bite the latest in an emerging trend of comedy-horror triumphs? No; it is the exact opposite"; he calls the script "pathetic" and the dialogue "basic, uninspiring, unintelligent and down-right insulting."
