= Imogen Toner =

British art director and actress

- Occupations: Art Director, Actress
- Years active: 2005–present

Imogen Toner is a British art director and actress of stage and screen. Aside from appearances in multiple fringe plays including The Not So Fatal Death of Grandpa Fredo and more recognised works such as Casualty, Waterloo Road, River City and Snow White, and Around the World in 80 Days she is perhaps best known for her appearances in the Scottish thriller films The Inheritance (2007) and Dark Nature (2009).

== Filmography ==
Year	Title	Role	Notes
2006	A Woman in Winter	Eve	
2007	The Inheritance	Tara	
2009	An Paiste Beo Bocht	Mae Brodie	
2009	Dark Nature	Chloe	
2012	Love Bite	Mandy	
2014	What We Did on Our Holiday	Beth Williams	(final film role)
