= Lyre Productions =

Scottish film company

Lyre Productions is a Scottish film company making original independent feature films.

== History ==
Lyre Productions were formed in January 2007 in order to make contemporary, Scottish feature films.

The debut feature film from Lyre was The Inheritance – an award-winning, independent, micro budget Scottish road movie, directed by Charles-Henri Belleville, written and produced by Tim Barrow, and executive produced by David Boaretto. David Boaretto | Producer, Additional Crew, Director The film stars Tim Barrow, Fraser Sivewright, Imogen Toner, and Tom Hardy. The Inheritance was released on DVD partnered by a 60 minute making-of documentary.

Lyre's second feature was The Space Between – an Edinburgh love story, following 2 strangers, brought together in a redemption tale. Shot in September 2009 in 17 days for £15,000, the film stars Vivien Reid, Tim Barrow, and David Whitney. Written and directed by Tim Barrow, the film premiered at Edinburgh Filmhouse in March 2011. The Space Between was released by Lyre on DVD in December 2012.

The third feature from Lyre is Riptide - a Scottish schizophrenia love story, currently in post-production. The film stars Tim Barrow, Elspeth Turner, David Whitney and David Tudor.
