= Freemoore =

Scottish multi-instrumentalist musician

Freemoore is the stage name of Andy Moore, a Scottish, Edinburgh based multi-instrumentalist musician, playing double bass, trumpet, guitar, synths, also sampling and singing. He is a former member of Edinburgh band The Ruffness. Freemoore's music was featured in the 2007 film The Inheritance, directed by Charles-Henri Belleville. He has played and recorded with the Dresden Dolls' Amanda Palmer; he plays the horn on her single "Leeds United" (2008). Freemoore also performed with the comedian Phil Kay in 2009. He currently deps for The Horndog Brass Band, and has been a member of the NoFit State Circus band since March 2010, on their shows 'Tabu' and 'Labyrinth'.
