= The Accrington Pals (play) =

The Accrington Pals is a 1981 play by Peter Whelan. It is based on the Accrington Pals unit in the First World War and contrasts its life at the front and experiences in the 1916 Battle of the Somme with the women left behind in Accrington.

== History ==
=== Production history ===
Whelan's inspiration for The Accrington Pals, he wrote, stemmed from his fascination with a "fuzzy snapshot of [his] mother taken in the First World War." It has been likened to the "documentary plays" of the 1960s.

The play was premiered at the Warehouse in London on 10 April 1981 by the Royal Shakespeare Company.

Among contemporaneous theater critics, Michael Billington noted the debut's "combination of theatricality and truth, likening it to the works of Harold Brighouse and Stanley Houghton; he would later call its 2013 revival "one of the best plays ever about the first world war. John Barber was less enthusiastic, claiming the work was Whelan "not at his happiest."

The play's American premiere took place on December 18, 1984 at the Off-off-Broadway Hudson Guild Theatre in Manhattan, New York City. It was directed by Daniel Gerroll. John Beaufort in his review in The Christian Science Monitor called it "a concerned and articulate drama... a play of atmosphere, character social commentary, and local color . Mr. Whelan clearly cherishes these spirited Lancastrians," while Frank Rich in The New York Times, said that the play "is by no means a complete waste of time. However plodding and humorless...it contains a scattering of crisply drawn scenes and characters. In the Hudson Guild's production, The Accrington Pals also proves an occasion for some exemplary acting." He also praised the direction, with minor reservations.

=== Premiere cast and crew ===
- Janet Dale (May)
- Nicholas Gecks (Tom)
- Peter Chelsom (Ralph)
- Trudie Styler (Eva)
- Sharon Bower (Sarah)
- Hilary Townley (Bertha)
- Brenda Fricker (Annie)
- Andrew Jarvis (Arthur)
- Jack Marcus (Reggie)
- Bob Peck (C.S.M. Rivers)
- Bill Alexander (Director)
- Kit Surrey (Design)
- Michael Calf (Lighting)
- John A. Leonard (Sound)
- Peter Washtell (Music arrangement)

=== Other productions ===
- In February 2013 James Dacre directed a revival at the Royal Exchange, Manchester with Emma Lowndes as May, Sarah Ridgeway as Eva, Robin Morrissey as Tom and Gerard Kearns as Ralph. The production won a UK Theatre Award for best design.
- In October 2017 Dumbarton People's Theatre performed the play.

=== Publication history ===
The play was first published by Methuen London Ltd in 1982.

== Scenes ==
Act 1

- 1) May's market stall
- 2) Recruiting office
- 3) May's stall
- 4) May's kitchen
- 5) May's kitchen (doubling as Tom's watch post.)
- 6) May's kitchen
- 7) May's stall (doubling as Caernarvon)
- 8) May's stall
- 9) May's kitchen
- 10) May's stall

Act 2

- 1) May's kitchen/France
- 2) May's kitchen/France
- 3) May's kitchen
- 4) The Somme front, France
- 5) Sarah's backyard
- 6) May's kitchen
- 7) May's stall
- 8) May's stall
