= The Space Between (2011 film) =

- Directed by: Tim Barrow
- Written by: Tim Barrow
- Produced by: Tim Barrow
- Starring: Vivien Reid; Tim Barrow; David Whitney
- Cinematography: Chris Martin
- Edited by: Anthony Bueno
- Music by: Fiona Rutherford; Freemoore; Gregor Douglas
- Release date: 10 March 2011
- Running time: 83 minutes
- Country: United Kingdom
- Language: English

The Space Between is an Edinburgh love story and redemption tale, produced by Lyre Productions. Filmed over 17 days in Edinburgh, for only £15,000, it was written & directed by Tim Barrow, and stars Barrow, Vivien Reid, and David Whitney.

== Production ==
The film was shot by DOP Chris Martin and edited by Anthony Bueno. The soundtrack comes from Edinburgh music-makers, including Fiona Rutherford and Freemoore. The sound mixer was Dan Johnson

The Space Between premiered at Edinburgh Filmhouse in 2011, and toured cinemas in Scotland, England and Berlin until 2013, completing 57 screenings, including at Screenplay film festival in Shetland in 2011.

Stills photography was shot by Louise Lacaille. Her exhibition of work was displayed at Henderson's in Edinburgh, and the Genesis cinema in London.

Artwork for the film created by Art Director Halla Groves-Raines was exhibited at Flaubert Gallery during the screening in Edinburgh, and at the Genesis cinema for the London premiere in 2013.

== Reception ==
The Space Between was named a "20th century Edinburgh love story" by The Scotsman, called "a tenderhearted romantic drama" by Screen Daily, and described as "beautifully shot" by Reel Scotland.
