= The Inheritance (2007 film) =

- Film poster
- Directed by: Charles-Henri Belleville
- Written by: Tim Barrow
- Produced by: Tim Barrow; David Boaretto
- Starring: Tim Barrow; Fraser Sivewright; Imogen Toner; Tom Hardy
- Cinematography: Chris Beck
- Edited by: Man Chong Li
- Music by: Fiona Rutherford; Freemoore; Rachel Newton
- Release date: October 2007 (Raindance)
- Running time: 62 minutes
- Country: United Kingdom
- Language: English

The Inheritance is micro-budget road movie following two Scottish brothers on a dark search to find their late father's inheritance. John Robbins, writing for Raindance Film Festival said the film is a "dark, touching look at brotherhood, identity and the stereotype of the Scotsman's inability to express his feelings."

As the debut feature film by director Charles-Henri Belleville, The Inheritance was filmed in February 2007 with a £5000 budget, in miniDV format. With a run time of 62 minutes, the film runs about half the two hours of the average feature film.

The Inheritance stars Fraser Sivewright, Tom Hardy, Imogen Toner and Tim Barrow. Barrow founded Lyre Productions, which made the movie. Barrow also served as the film's primary writer.

== Plot ==
Two brothers meet at their father's (Tom Hardy) funeral. David (Tim Barrow) has come up from London, Fraser (Fraser Sivewright) lives in the village where he grew up.

In their father's workshop they discover a note instructing them to find his inheritance located somewhere on the Isle of Skye. They set off in his VW van finding conflict, comedy and memories — confronting their past and each other.

Picking up a hitchhiker, Tara (Imogen Toner), brings them to breaking point as they reach Skye. She leaves, and David heads off on foot through the island searching for a place named Cille Chriosd. On a remote beach, as the sun sets, David and Fraser face their final confrontation.

== Production ==
The Inheritance was directed by Charles-Henri Belleville and written & produced by Tim Barrow. It was filmed in 11 days on miniDV by a cast and crew of 11, on location in Scotland — using natural light. The script allowed improvisation and the story was adapted to suit circumstances.

"Originally we were going to improvise everything – work with actors I knew, get a minibus, shoot at specific locations, drive north, film everything, live it, breathe it, edit together and present accordingly. But we needed a story to match the scenery and the music. So I wrote it."
Tim Barrow

Those involved worked full-time, editing through the night and weekends. By September the film was finished and premiered at the Raindance Film Festival in October 2007.

At the British Independent Film Awards, The Inheritance won the Raindance Award. Festival screenings followed, as well as cinema screenings in London and Scotland.

== Reception ==
The Inheritance screened at 11 film festivals including its premiere at Raindance Film Festival where it was nominated Best UK Feature and won the Raindance Award at the 2007 British Independent Film Awards. Further nominations include Best Director & Best Producer at 2008 BAFTA Scotland New Talent Awards, and Best Debut UK Feature at London's East End Film Festival.

In January 2009, the film was released on DVD, along with a documentary about making a micro budget, independent feature film.
