= Seven Dwarves (TV series) =

- Narrated by: Julian Barratt
- No. of series: 1
- No. of episodes: 7

Production
- Producers: Channel 4, The Garden
- Running time: 60 mins

Original release
- Network: Channel 4
- Release: 16 August – 27 September 2011

Seven Dwarves is a seven-part documentary reality television series commissioned by Channel 4 in the United Kingdom. The show follows seven dwarf actors as they prepare for and take part in the pantomime Snow White and the Seven Dwarfs.

The series began broadcasting on 16 August 2011 in the 9pm primetime slot. The first episode attracted more than 2.5 million viewers. The subsequent episodes were equally popular, with the second episode being watched by 2.77 million people.

== Cast ==
=== Featuring ===
- Max Laird (Grumbly)
- Karen Anderson (Blusher)
- Craig Garner (Prof)
- Jamie John (Cheeky)
- Josh Bennett (Sniffly)
- Ryan Webb (Snoozy)
- Laura Whitfield (Loopy)
