= Julian Barratt =

English comedian and musician (born 1968)

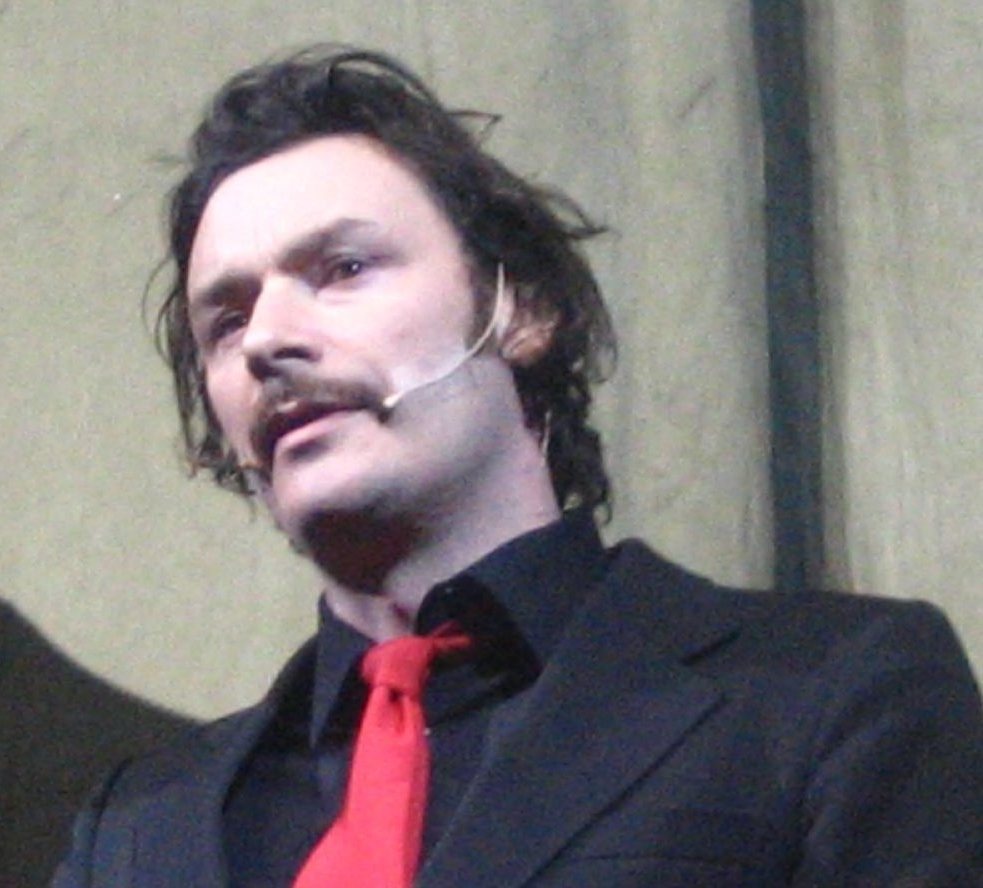
- Barratt in 2006
- Born: Julian Barratt Pettifer; 4 May 1968 (age 58); Leeds, Yorkshire, England
- Education: University of Reading
- Occupations: Comedian; actor; musician
- Years active: 1995–present
- Partner: Julia Davis
- Children: 2

Julian Barratt Pettifer (born 4 May 1968) is an English comedian, actor, and musician. As a comedian and comic actor, he is known for his use of surreal humour and black comedy. During the 2000s he was part of the Mighty Boosh comedy troupe alongside his comedy partner Noel Fielding.

Born in Leeds, West Yorkshire, Barratt attended the University of Reading and first performed stand up comedy while at university. In 1997 he first met Mighty Boosh collaborator Noel Fielding when he attended one of Barratt's solo stand-up gig's at the Hellfire comedy club. After this Barratt and Fielding began performing regular solo stand-up gigs together and they soon realised that they liked each other's stuff and began writing and doing the gigs together. Sometime around 1998 they then performed their first comedy show together in London which was a mix of both stand up and sketch comedy and then in 1998 they took the show, The Mighty Boosh, to the Edinburgh fringe festival and returned again in 1999 with Arctic Boosh and in 2000 with Autoboosh. In 2001 The Mighty Boosh became a six-part radio show on BBC London Live, called The Boosh later transferring to BBC Radio 4. This was followed by the television show The Mighty Boosh, which ran for three series on BBC Three from 2004 to 2007. The show generated a cult following and won a variety of awards. From February to April 2006 they went on tour around the UK with the stage show The Mighty Boosh Live and then toured the UK for a second time from September 2008 to January 2009 with The Mighty Boosh Live: Future Sailors Tour.

Alongside Fielding, he has starred in Unnatural Acts, Nathan Barley and Garth Marenghi's Darkplace. Barratt also co-wrote and starred in the 2017 film Mindhorn. He starred in the Channel 4 black comedy-drama sitcom Flowers.

== Early life and education ==
Barratt was born Julian Barratt Pettifer in Leeds, West Yorkshire, where he grew up. His father was a science teacher and a fan of jazz music. Barratt's father made an appearance in the first series of The Mighty Boosh, and both his parents appeared in the second series.

As a teen, Barratt played in a band, and has described how when he was 17 he wanted to begin playing in a jazz band in London, but was not successful.

He began studying a course in American studies at Reading University, but left before graduating. Barratt adopted his middle name as his surname to distinguish himself from reporter Julian Pettifer.

== Career ==
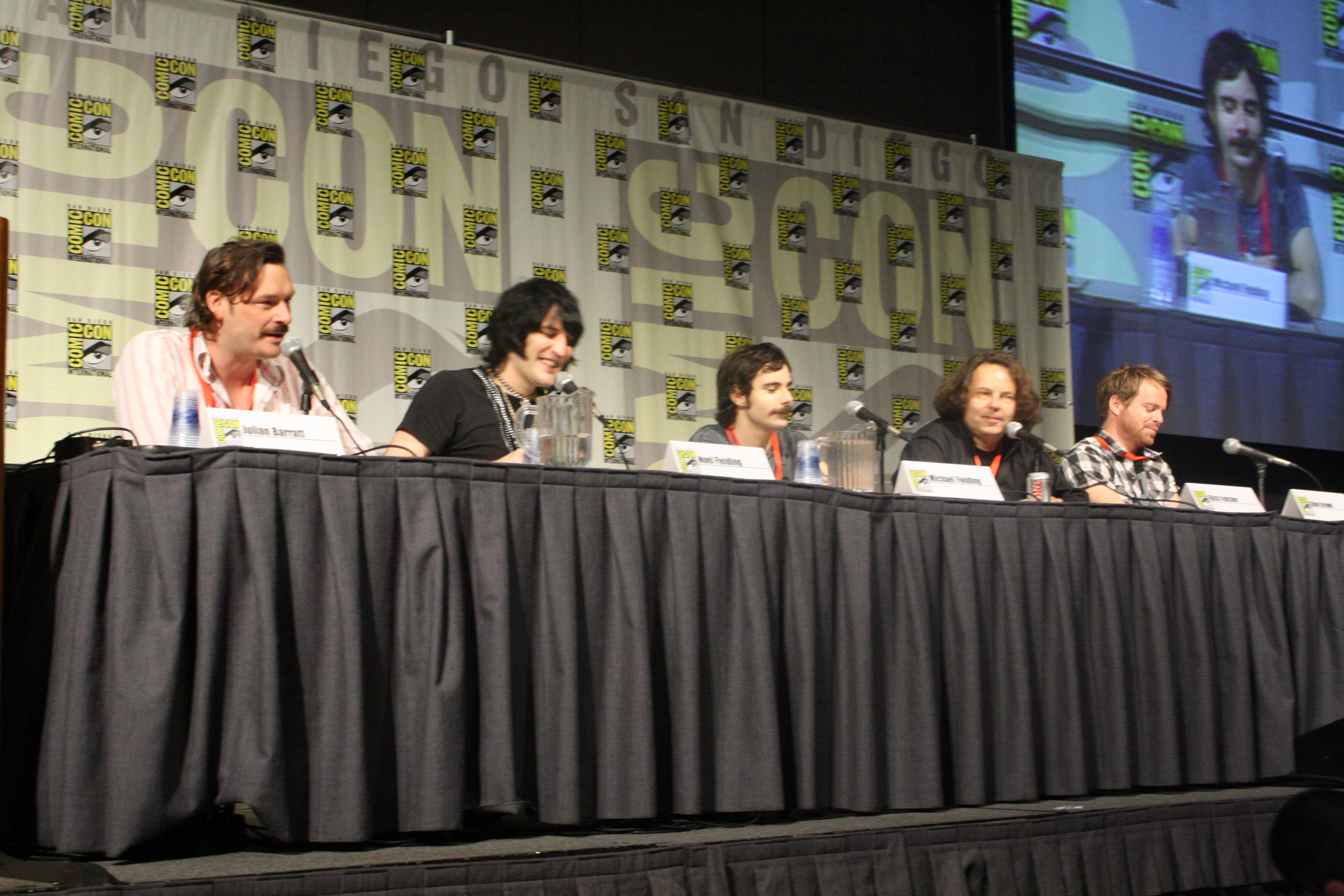
The cast of the Mighty Boosh at comic-con; from left to right Julian Barratt, Noel Fielding, Michael Fielding, Rich Fulcher and Dave Brown. 2009

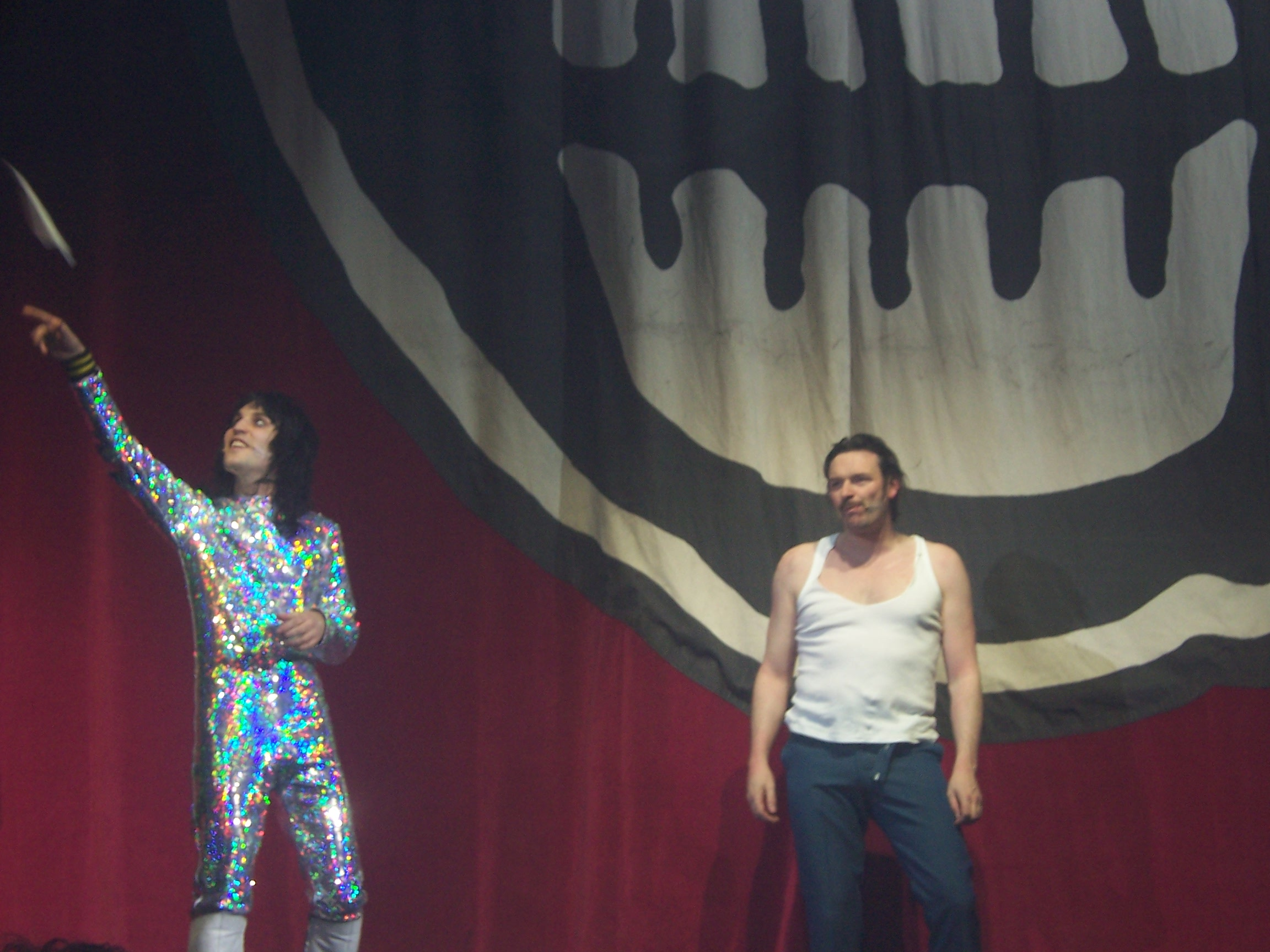
Noel Fielding and Julian Barratt as Vince Noir and Howard Moon in the stageshow The Mighty Boosh Live at the Brighton Dome. February 2006

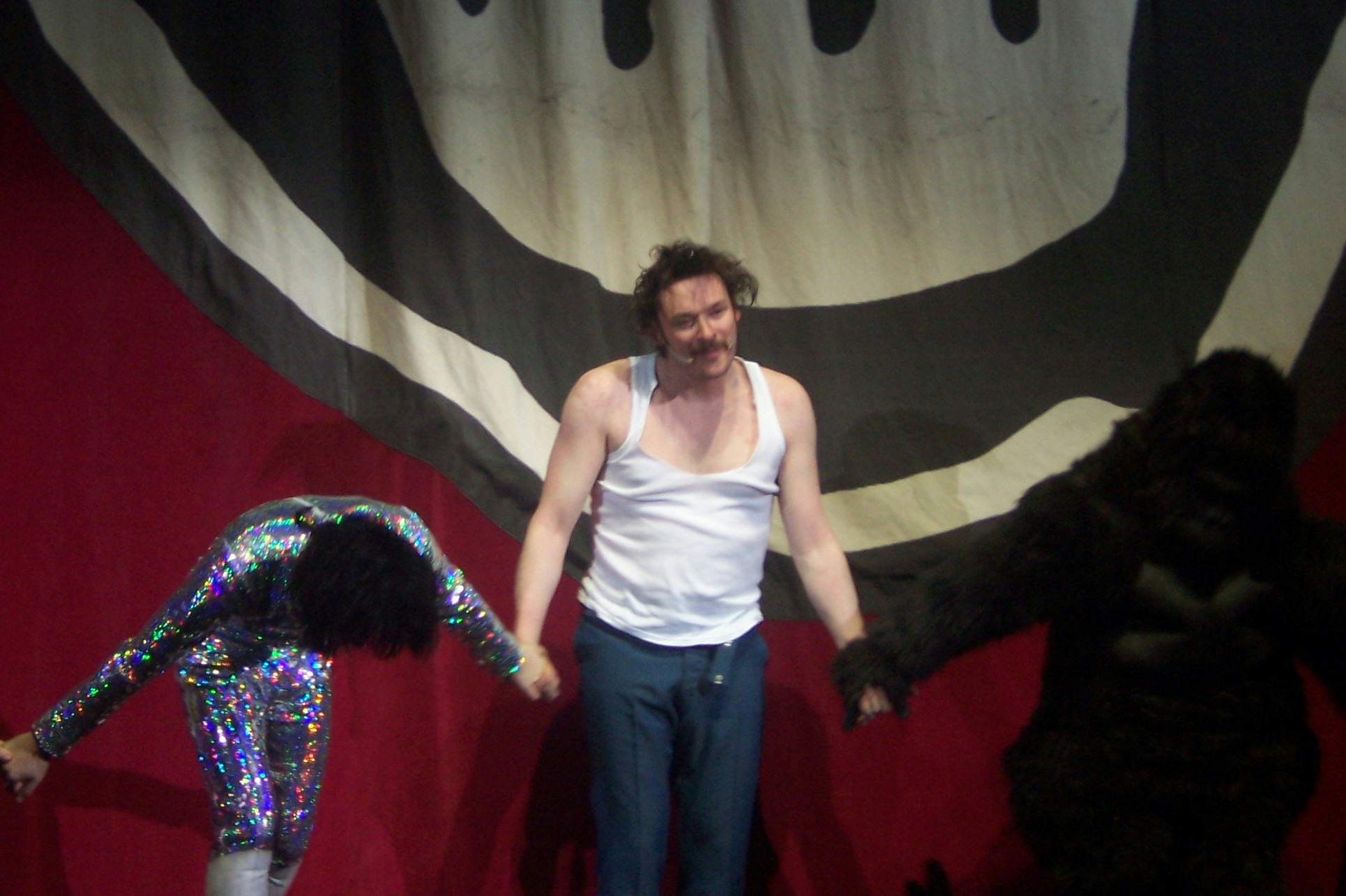
A performance of the stageshow The Mighty Boosh Live at the Brighton Dome. From left to right; Noel Fielding, Julian Barratt, Dave Brown. February 2006

=== Stand Up ===
On his beginnings in stand up Barratt has commented that "I was never like Noel [Fielding] or Lee Mack, who are just funny all the time. No one ever said to me, you should be a comedian mate. But I watched a lot of stand-up at uni – people like Mark Lamarr, Sean Hughes, Eddie Izzard, just standing on a stage doing these phenomenal routines. And I could see how you could do it. So I started doing it myself, and I was so shocked when it worked. I remember one time I completely forgot what I was about to say, and I just ran out of the venue." It has also been commented that this occurred "...during his first standup sketch at Reading University..." and that he "...ran through the back door mid-act and through fields to a lake." Barratt has further commented that after he left the venue "...the manager came out after me and said: 'Get back in there, it's going well.' So I went back. I suppose that was a big turning point for me."

Barratt has further commented on his beginnings in theatre that "I'm looking at a big poster of myself now and I know my 16-year-old self would see that and think, what is going on there? He would be amazed that people actually like what I do. When Noel and I started gigging together and found people were really enjoying it, it was such a thrill. It was a validation of what felt like a long process of growing up, coming up against all these difficulties if you're shy and you have all these dreams and thoughts you can't communicate. It was very exciting to finally find a way to express myself, and seeing people enjoying that. I suppose I'm interested in communicating a pretentious, pompous person a lot of the time, and I have to recognise there is that in me. I did a few serious things before I got into comedy, which make me shudder now. I remember having my mate film me, all shadowy, doing performance poetry. My goodness."

He first met Noel Fielding when he attended one of Barratt's solo stand-up gig's at the Hellfire comedy club and Fielding approached Barratt after his gig had finished. After Fielding entered The Daily Telegraph open mic award and attended the final at the Edinburgh comedy festival he was signed to Avalon talent agency and through Avalon began performing on the same comedy bills as Barratt. Whilst performing on the comedy network together on the same bill they realised they liked each other's stuff and began writing and doing gigs together.

In 2006 Fielding commented that "We were doing stand-up and were on the same bill together. I was on first and usually you can only have about one weird comedian on a line-up. He'd been doing it a bit longer than me... [Barratt was like]'...Let's write together'. I've been stuck with him ever since and that was about eight years ago or something." Whilst Barratt and Fielding were on The Jonathan Ross Show, Ross asked them "And did you perform as solo acts ever, did you do like stand up..." with Barratt responding "yeah, yeah, that's how we sort of met really on the circuit, doing stand up, yeah.", with Ross responding "But, but was it similar to the Boosh stuff, 'cos the Boosh stuff it seems to be so much of a partnership I can't imagine it being taken apart and being served up separately.", with Barratt responding that "We were both doing quite surreal stuff, eh...", with Fielding adding "It was quite weird wasn't it, alot [sic]weirder than the show in a way...", with Barratt continuing "...but we sort of, when we first met we kind of liked each others comedy but we didn't know that it would work, we didn't know whether it was gonna cancel each other out and make....", with Fielding responding "Yeah, too weird to make sort of, straight...", with Barratt continuing "...might just become geography or something else or... this sort of thing, but it worked for some reason...", with Fielding adding "We had quite a good chemistry straight away."

On the day they met they both went back to Julian's place that night where Barratt played music on his Akai sampler whilst Fielding used a ping-pong ball to make an eye patch. Fielding has commented on their shared interest in music that "I was sort of a bit more rock n roll and pop and he [Barratt] was a bit more jazz but then we sort of met in the middle with electro... but Julian was... I think he left university to join a band, we were both in bands before we were in the Boosh, so we sort of came from that background. Lot of our friends were in bands." They also found they both shared common interests in comedy including the work of Vic Reeves and Bob Mortimer.

=== Film and television ===
==== The Mighty Boosh ====
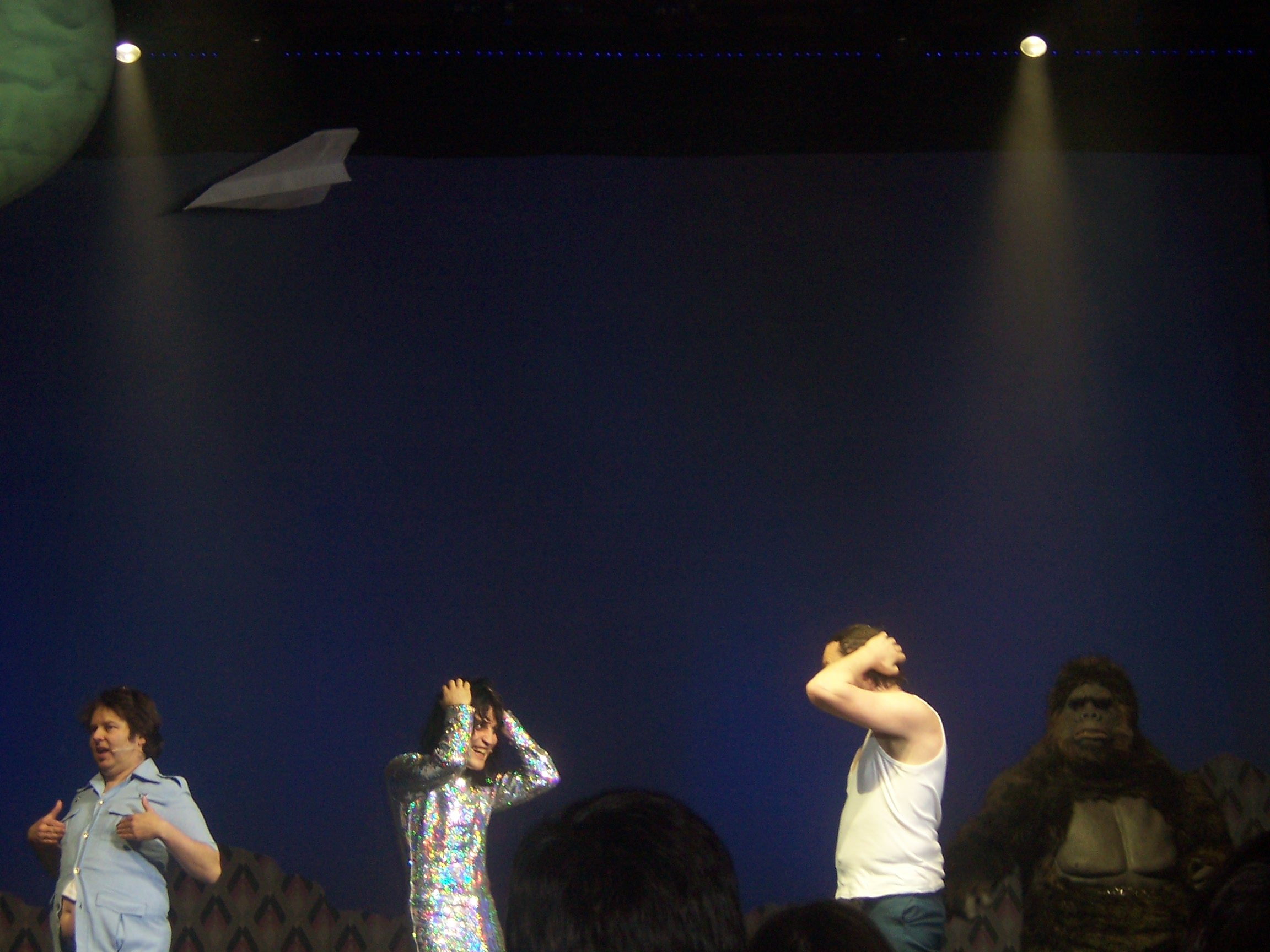
A performance of the stageshow The Mighty Boosh Live at the Brighton Dome. From left to right; Rich Fulcher, Noel Fielding, Julian Barratt, Dave Brown. February 2006

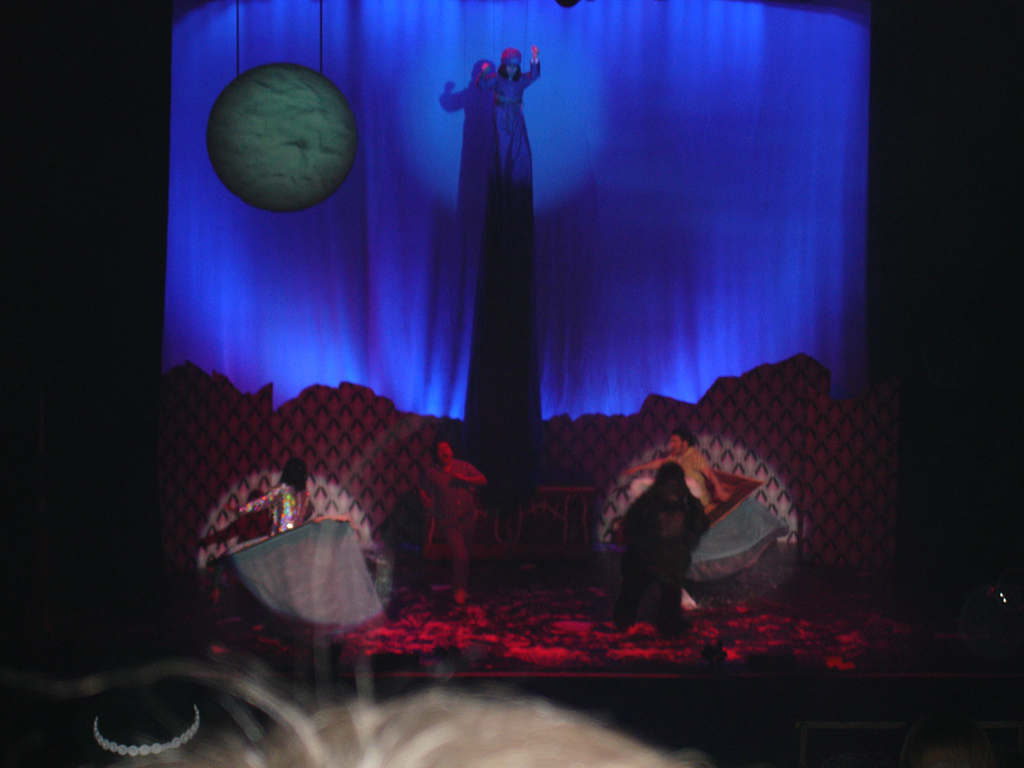
The magic carpet-assisted finale of the Mighty Boosh Live stageshow. From Left to right;Noel Fielding as Vince Noir, Rich Fulcher as Bob Fossil, Michael Fielding as Naboo, Dave Brown as Bollo and Julian Barratt as Howard Moon. Performing in the stageshow the Mighty Boosh Live. March 2006

Barratt and Fielding have commented on the beginning of The Mighty Boosh, with Barratt commenting that "We performed together for the first time in ... was it in that show by Stewart Lee?", with Fielding replying "yeah, Stewart Lee's show, Moby Dick and King Dong (At the Edinburgh Fringe Festival, 1997) ... Julian played King Dong's penis...", with Barratt replying "...an enormous penis...", and then with Fielding replying "perfect King Dong... then we thought let's do a show together."

Sometime around 1998 they then put on their first comedy show and it was commented by Nigel Coan with whom they collaborated with on Mighty Boosh that "They did their first gig at Oranje Boom Boom which is sort of in Chinatown in London, and ah, which was ridiculous, I mean it was really, like, ridiculous costumes and um, they didn't know what... they really [didn't] know what they were doing... ...It was very raw, but it was, it was hilarious... ...They thought lets do a show, an Edinburgh show. I think they started to think about doing that. So they got a gig at Hen and Chickens...". Dave Brown who also collaborated on the Mighty Boosh with them commented further on their time at the Hen and chickens which is a theatre bar in Islington, London, "They would use the Hen and Chickens as this kind of... place to, a platform to just try stuff out and it was just a great little place they could do a regular spot... ...where they would probably write and have ideas in the week, try stuff out for half of that and then for the rest of it, it would just be improv and mucking about. Then they took the, um, took The Mighty Boosh up to Edinburgh and then two more shows Arctic Boosh (1999), Autoboosh (2000)...". Both Michael Fielding and Richard Ayoade appeared in a performance of the Mighty Boosh at the Hen and Chickens in 2002 during a live run through of a Mighty Boosh pilot.

Fielding and Barratt commented on their time at the Hen and Chickens, with Fielding commenting that "...cos it'd be stand up and people would come on and do straight stand up. And then we used to put potted plants all around the gig and music on... ...to try and make it into a sort of play... people couldn't believe the audacity. It got some sort of reputation as being sort of enigmatic but we're just really unprofessional. We didn't know anything about theatre or what you did." with Barratt responding to Fielding "Speak for yourself, I was in a Sartre play at university I'll have you know. Huis Clos." Fielding has commented further on their first live show, The Mighty Boosh, “Julian had a song about a mammoth that he wanted to sing to a girl in the audience, and I had a few ideas for some weird sketches... ...We started working on our ideas together... ...We were zookeepers and we got sucked through our bosses' eyes and into a magic forest..."

In 2001 The Mighty Boosh became a six-part radio show on BBC London Live, later transferring to BBC Radio 4 and Barratt has humorously commented that "...so we did a radio show, we did, we sort of recorded it in a sort of old railway sort of arch...", with Fielding adding "in Shoreditch"... with Julian continuing "...built our studio out of weird... little children's toys...". Barratt and fielding have also commented on the process of moving the show from the stage to TV, with Barratt commenting "...we wanted to get on TV but it'd been a lot of trouble because they thought it was eh, the scripts we sort of gave them were sort of like massive epic adventures that sounded like it would cost them a million pounds to make so they said this isn't, I don't know how this is going to work on stage, well actually what happened is..." with Fielding adding "We wrote it for Channel 4 originally", and with Julian continuing "...[we spoke to them] before we'd done a stage show and they said how is this going to work on TV cos it is ridiculous. So we wrote, we did a stage show and then they said hows that going to work on TV because its really good live, so, perhaps we should've done it inside a television set."

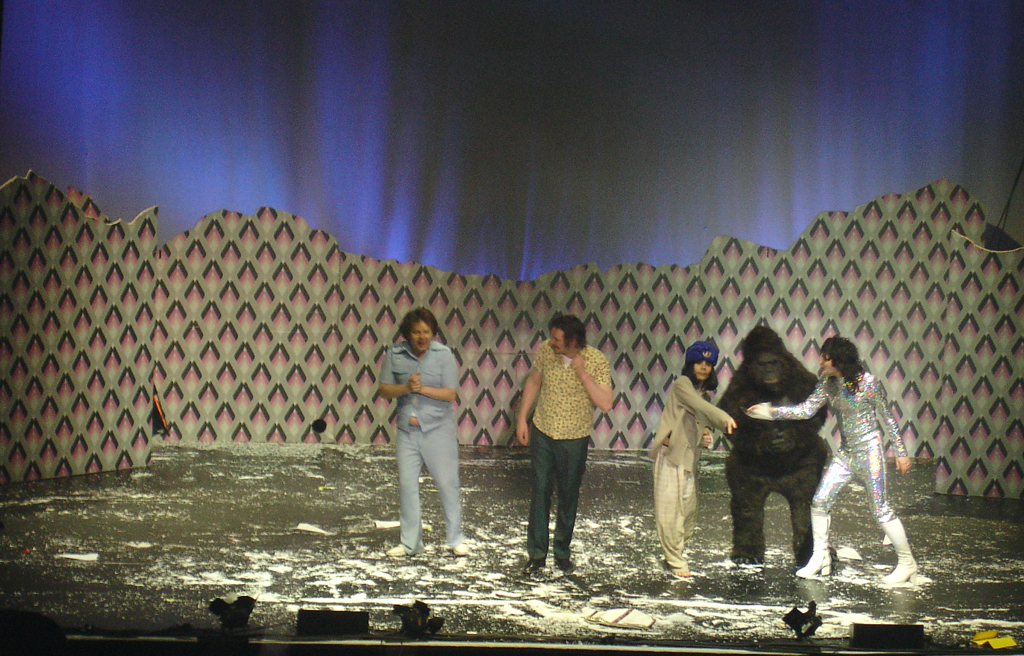
The Mighty Boosh Live stage show. From left to right: Rich Fulcher, Julian Barratt, Michael Fielding, Dave Brown and Noel Fielding. March 2006

In 2004 it became an 8 part TV show which aired on BBC Three with a second series airing in 2005 and a third airing in 2007 with there being 20 episodes created over three series. In each series the setting changes, with the first series set in a zoo operated by Bob Fossil, the second in a flat and the third in a secondhand shop in Dalston called Nabootique. In 2006 Fielding and Barratt went on tour with a new theatre show The Mighty Boosh Live. Fielding has commented in relation to touring that "The touring lifestyle is quite hard... ...In The Boosh tour we did a 100 day tour and we had one day off a week to travel and we were playing arenas and we partied every single night and we got up for sound check at six o'clock. So we were like Dracula. I was like Dracula. So I'd wake up at six, do a sound check, wake up, do the show, go to a party, stay up till five in the morning, sleep all day, every day for a hundred... ." Fielding has further commented about the Mighty Boosh that "It was crazy cos we were just going.... ...it was never meant to be, we were never meant to be playing the O2 and Wembley and being on the cover of Time Out and... ...being on Jonathan Ross I don't think we ever thought that would happen... ...We always sort of just made it in our bedroom and then brought it out and stuff happened. We were as surprised as anyone when we won the Perrier and we were surprised when it got put on telly. We were like 'Wow this is great' we weren't ever sort of planning it. Like... ..we didn't even know if we could make a living from it." Fielding has commented further that "We always thought we'd make one show and that'd be the end of it. But after we won the Perrier, everyone was telling us that we had to do another, which we did and brought it to Melbourne and won the Barry, and then we made a radio show that won the Douglas Adams Award. We won loads. It was manic. We always thought we'd do a couple of years together and go our separate ways. We went from stages to the radio show to television to live shows. It went on and on." Barratt has also commented that "Me and Noel went to HBO once and pitched this really ludicrous idea about us driving around in a haunted car and they just stared at us. Literally stared at us!... ...Luckily, we were together so we could laugh about it..."

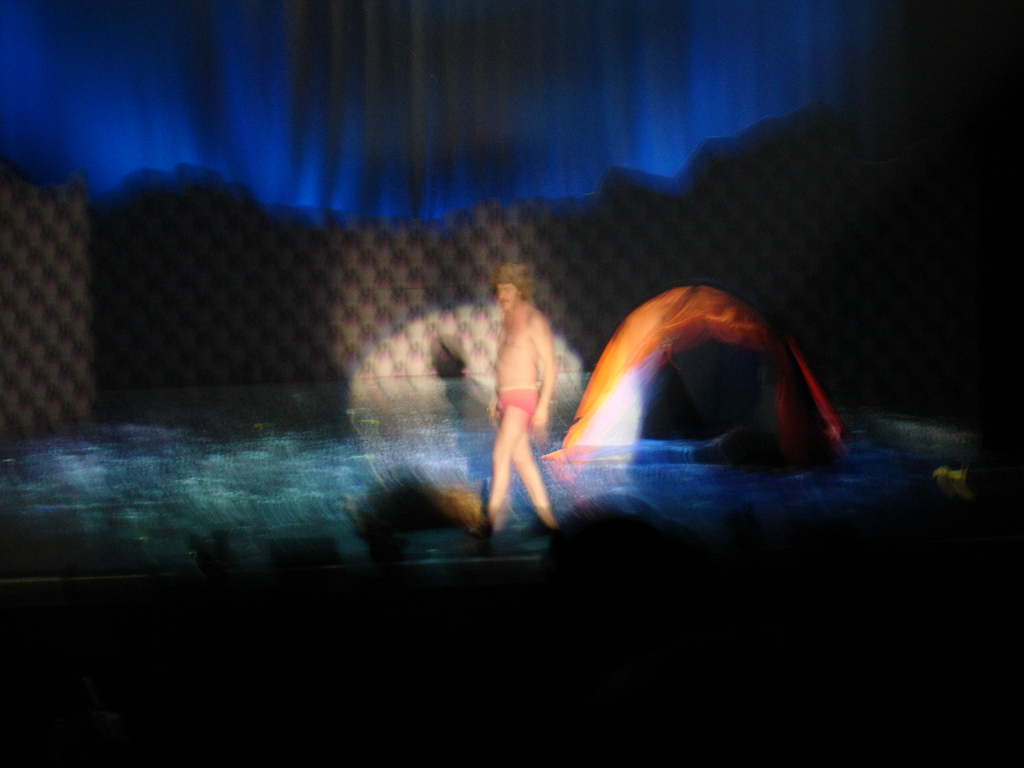
Julian Barratt as Howard Moon in the stageshow The Mighty Boosh Live. March 2006

In the Mighty Boosh, Barratt plays the character Howard Moon opposite Noel Fielding's Vince Noir. Howard labels himself a "jazz maverick" and claims to be a multi-talented intellectual, calling himself a "man of action", but he is actually unsuccessful in his literary and romantic ventures. He is unpopular with many of the characters, including Mrs. Gideon (who always forgets his name), Bob Fossil (who often uses Howard as a puppet for his bizarre schemes), and Bollo (who often says his name wrongly or ignores him completely).

Fielding commented in 2015 that a film was something he talked about writing with Barratt and he also commented in 2013 that "I would love to do a Boosh film I really would. I hope we do cos I feel like that's what we started out wanting to do. We really wanted to do a film, really,... ...we wanted to do a film, and then we thought alright we'll do a live show. We didn't really know how to do a live show we thought we'd just learn, and then we sort of... ...we did a radio show, we did a TV show, we never quite got around to doing a film..." In 2008 it was also commented that "A film is the first thing we ever wanted to do, so we've always come up with ideas and stuck them in a drawer." and in 2014 it was commented that "The pair have written two film scripts in the past, though neither made it to production. One was a "Rocky Horror Picture Show type thing," according to Fielding, in which Barratt played a character who has woken up believing himself to be the last man on earth. The other was an Arctic adventure – 'because we always liked the Arctic'."

Fielding commented in 2015 that while creating Noel Fielding's Luxury Comedy that "Originally I used to do all the paintings for the animations. This meant that I was filming in the day and staying up until 5 am painting. After three weeks of this I started to feel unusual so Ivana Zorn, who is Nigel Coan's partner, now does a majority of the painting and I just design the main characters. Nigel animates everything like a futuristic goose." Fielding formed "Secret Peter Productions" with Nigel Coan who, along with Fielding and Zorn, helped to animate series 1 and 2 of the Mighty Boosh TV show, An evening with Noel Fielding and Noel Fielding's Luxury Comedy. Coan also directed Noel Fielding's Luxury Comedy as well as helping to write it along with Fielding. Dave Brown also contributed to graphics for the Mighty Boosh including the DVD cover art for the Mighty Boosh Live 2006 stage show. Brown also "...designed and compiled The Mighty Book of Boosh..." as well as all the publishing output for the Mighty Boosh. It has been commented that Barratt "...composed all the music for The Mighty Boosh." with Barratt also commenting that "I write the music, eh, but we both sort of write, we both write the lyrics, and we, I do the music mostly..." with Fielding replying to Barratt that "I have a go at the melodies then he goes away and makes it..." and then with Barratt replying "...tweaks, tweaks it a bit". Fielding also made drawings that formed a basis for the characters costumes and make-up in the Mighty Boosh TV show. Regular Boosh collaborators include Michael Fielding, Rich Fulcher, Dave Brown, Nigel Coan, Richard Ayoade, Matt Berry and Ivanna Zorn. In 2002 during a live run through of a Mighty Boosh pilot Richard Ayoade played adventurer Dixon Bainbridge, but Matt Berry replaced him in the first television series, since Ayoade was under contract with Channel 4.

The Mighty Boosh "... almost didn't make it to television. Around 2000, Barratt and Fielding disappeared into development hell. They had done a sketch show for Radio 4, but no one was sure how to translate their act on to TV. That's until Steve Coogan, who had seen them in Edinburgh in 1999 when they were performing as Arctic Boosh, moved things along. His production company... ...sold the concept to the BBC simply by saying: 'If we were young, we'd want to be them.'" The style of humour in the Mighty Boosh is often described as surreal, as well as being escapist and new wave comedy. Fielding has further commented that "I think our show is magical and fantastical. We tell very intricate, weird stories. Vince Noir is quite modern, a bit of an indie kid; Howard Moon is... ...eccentric... ...and we rely heavily on Julian's music and my animation... ...It's such a weird shambles of stuff."

The name "Mighty Boosh" was originally a phrase used by a friend of Michael Fielding's to describe the hair that Michael had as a child. From August 2008 to January 2009 they went on tour for a second time with a new stage show of the Mighty Boosh.

==== Other ====
Barratt has had parts in other dramas, often alongside his Mighty Boosh partner Noel Fielding. He starred as Dan Ashcroft, a frustrated magazine writer, in the Channel 4 media satire Nathan Barley, and appeared in the surrealistic black comedy series Asylum alongside Simon Pegg and Jessica Stevenson (who wrote and starred in Spaced). The character of Brian Topp in Spaced was written for Barratt, but eventually went to Mark Heap. Barratt played Jackson, a musician, in How Not to Live Your Life. He starred in the "Freelance Scientist" commercial for Metz alcopop. He appeared as The Padre in the spoof horror series Garth Marenghi's Darkplace. He also starred in (and was a writer for) the 1998 sketch show Unnatural Acts, alongside Fielding. Before this, Barratt was one half of an experimental comedy duo called "The Pod" with friend Tim Hope, in which they billed themselves as a "Cyberdance Collective". During this time he also appeared in the 2001 film Lucky Break.

Barratt made his directing début for Warp Films with theatre director Dan Jemmett. Curtains is set in a Norfolk seaside town. It is a dark comedy about a Punch and Judy man. In 2012, Barratt directed his first music video, for the song "All of Me" by Tanlines. He can be heard as the voiceover on many adverts, such as More Th>n Car, House and Pet insurance, and the Directgov advert. He appeared in the music video for Mint Royale's "Blue Song", alongside Noel Fielding, Nick Frost, and Michael Smiley. In 2010, Barratt took part in Sky Comedy's Little Crackers. He wrote and directed a 15-minute film based on his teen band, Satan's Hoof. On 12 March 2011, he made a brief appearance as Heathcliff in Noel Fielding's "Wuthering Heights" dance on the Let's Dance for Comic Relief finale. He also narrated the 2011 documentary Seven Dwarves.

In 2012, Barratt appeared in the miniseries Treasure Island on Sky1, as well as narrating the BBC Two documentary The Tube. He also had a part as an art teacher in the BBC drama White Heat. In 2013, he appeared in the fifth series of Being Human, playing a werewolf named Larry Chrysler. He also narrated the BBC Two documentaries The Route Masters: Running London's Roads and The Fifteen Billion Pound Railway. In April 2014, he collaborated with Julia Davis and Joe Frank on Frank's radio show "Isolation," which was broadcast as part of KCRW's UnFictional series.

In April 2016, he starred as Maurice Flowers, a children's author battling depression, in the Channel 4 series, Flowers, a 6 part dark comedy mini series which follows the eccentric and dysfunctional members of the Flowers family. He reprised the role for the second series in 2018.

He plays the title character in the film Mindhorn, which he co-wrote with Simon Farnaby. It was released through Netflix on 12 May 2017.

In 2019, Barratt appeared in the Killing Eve episode "Nice and Neat" as a sinister man (also named Julian) who helps an injured Villanelle before attempting to trap her in his home. That same year, he voiced Mr. Swan in an advert for Sipsmith gin.

In 2024, Barratt appeared in series 2 of Extraordinary as a special powers counsellor. The lead character had a crush on him and they shared a kiss after having described him as a DILF to her friend Carrie. He also appeared in the miniseries Knuckles as Jack Sinclair.

Since late 2024, Barratt provides voiceovers for Absolute Radio.

=== Stage ===
From 3 June to 9 July 2011, Barratt played the Mayor in a production of Nikolai Gogol's classic comedy The Government Inspector at the Young Vic Theatre. In October 2012, he returned to the stage in Lucy Kirkwood's play NSFW at the Royal Court.

=== Music ===
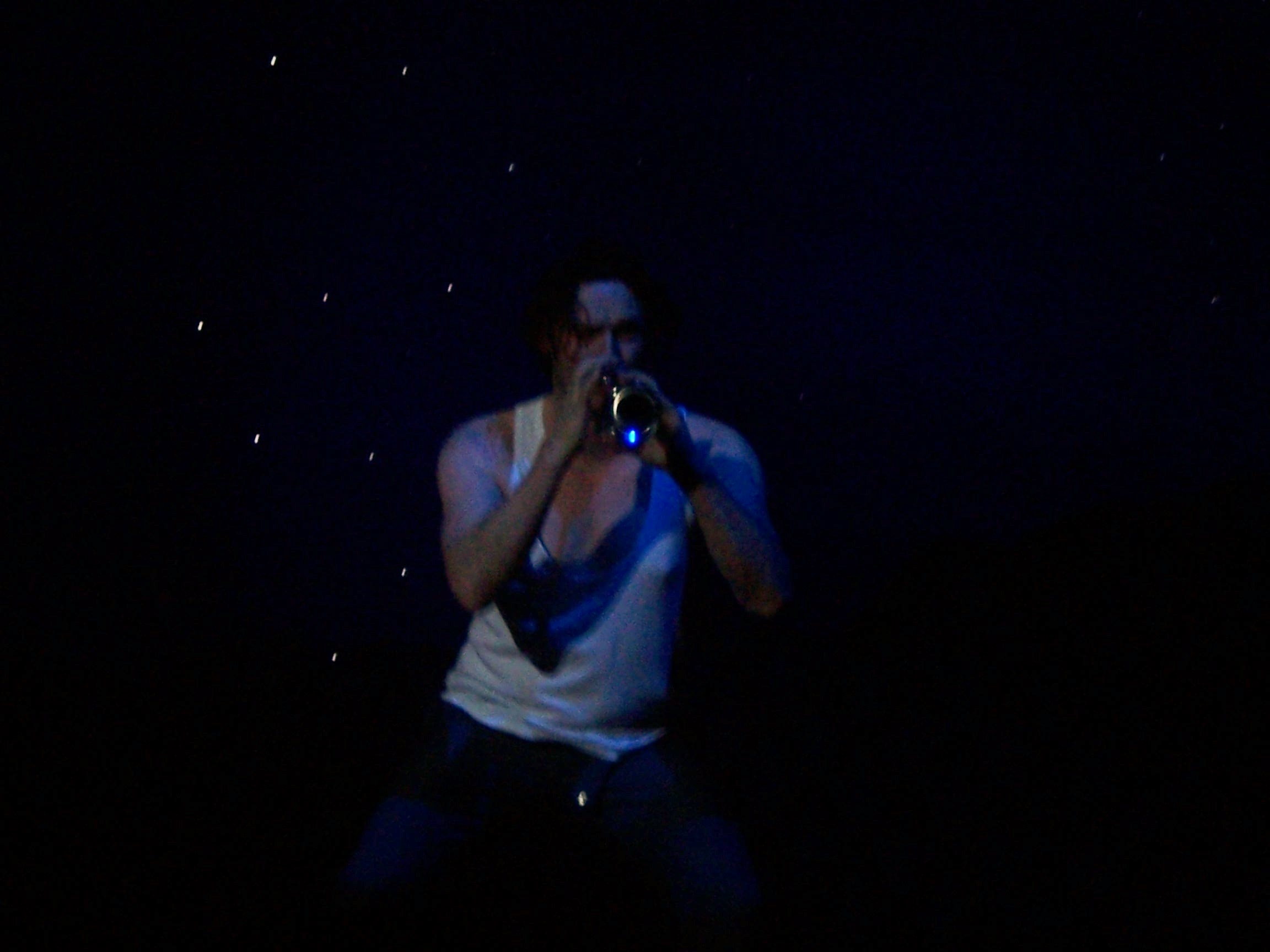
Julian Barratt as Howard Moon sending the audience into "...a jazz trance." at the Mighty Boosh Live stage show. Brighton Dome. February 2006

Barratt has commented that "At 16 I was into jazz fusion. Not even jazz, just jazz fusion. Rock instruments played like jazz. Really not fashionable in any way. People like Weather Report, Jack Pastorius. My dad was bang into it, so I thought it was normal. Until I played some to my mates. Then when I saw their reaction, it became my dirty secret. I could play guitar pretty well. Or pretty fast anyway. Me and my mate had duels, trying to outspeed each other to become the fastest guitarist in Yorkshire. That was all that mattered to me... ...I got into heavy metal because you could legitimately play solos. Van Halen was a big influence... ..And I played a lot of long, fast guitar solos."

Barratt and Fielding have commented on the end of one of the episodes of the Mighty Boosh with Barratt commenting that "There's a scene at the end of one of the episodes where I get to do a really long guitar solo for about five minutes. So fulfilling one of my childhood dreams..." with Fielding adding "...Roger Daltrey was there... ...He got to watch Julian's solo..." with Barratt replying "...Noel was playing bongos..." and with Fielding replying "Really badly" and Barratt replied "You can't play bongos " with Fielding adding "I was playing a bongo player... ...you did it really well and I did it really badly... We'd been hanging out with Keith Moon someone who can really play the drums and I couldn't play at all..."

In the early 1990s Barratt was in a band called Groove Solution with Dave Westlake. In 2012 he played jazz guitar live on stage with Tenacious D. He has also played bass with Chris Corner in IAMX, and played guitar for Little Chief during their European tour.

== Personal life ==
Barratt is in a relationship with comedian and collaborator Julia Davis. The couple have twin sons, born in 2007. In 2010, they performed together in a production of Chekhov's The Bear for Sky Arts 2 and in Sally4Ever, which Davis also wrote and directed. Barratt is known to be shy, quiet, and self-deprecating. Unlike his comedy partner Noel Fielding, he prefers not to appear on comedy quiz shows or make similar public appearances, stating that he would rather "stay at home with a good book".

== Filmography ==
=== Film ===
Year	Title	Role	Notes
2000	Sweet	Stitch	
2001	Lucky Break	Paul Dean	
2002	Surrealisimo: The Trial of Salvador Dalí	Rosey	
2003	How to Tell when a Relationship is Over	Him	
2003	The Reckoning	Gravedigger	
2003	The Principles of Lust	Phillip	
2008	Curtains		Short film; writer, director
2009	Bunny and the Bull	Atilla	
2013	The Harry Hill Movie	Conch	
2013	A Field in England	Commander Trower	
2014	ABCs of Death 2	Peter Toland	Segment "B is for Badger"; also writer, director
2015	Aaaaaaaah!	Jupiter	
2016	Brakes	Ray	
2017	Mindhorn	Richard Thorncroft / Mindhorn	Co-writer
2018	In Fabric	Stash	
2021	The Electrical Life of Louis Wain	Dr. Elphik	
2022	Rogue Agent	Phil	

=== Television ===
Year	Title	Role	Notes
1996	Asylum	Victor / Julian	6 episodes; also writer
1998	Unnatural Acts	Various	6 episodes; also writer and composer
2004	Garth Marenghi's Darkplace	The Padre	3 episodes
2004	AD/BC: A Rock Opera	Tony Iscariot	Television special
2004–2007	The Mighty Boosh	Howard Moon / Various	20 episodes; also co-creator, composer and writer
2005	Nathan Barley	Dan Ashcroft	6 episodes
2009	How Not to Live Your Life	Jackson	Episode "Don the Singer"
2010	Little Crackers	Himself	Episode: "Satan's Hoof"; also writer, director
2010	Comedy Shorts	Smirnoff	Episode: "The Bear"
2012	White Heat	Derek Bowden	2 episodes
2012	Treasure Island	Thomas Redruth	Miniseries
2012	Being Human	Larry Chrysler	Episode: "Pie and Prejudice"
2013	NTSF:SD:SUV::	Lockheed	Episode: "U-KO'ed"
2015	Prison Night	Narrator	
2016	Mid Morning Matters with Alan Partridge	Blackbird Goodbrooke	Episode: "Blackbird + Gangster"
2016–2018	Flowers	Maurice	12 episodes
2018	Sally4Ever	Nigel	7 episodes
2019	Killing Eve	Julian	Episode: "Nice and Neat"
2019	Mao Mao: Heroes of Pure Heart	Rufus (voice)	Episode: "Outfoxed"
2019	Moominvalley	Mr. Brisk (voice)	Episode: "Moomin's Winter Follies"
2020	Truth Seekers	Dr. Peter Toynbee	5 episodes
2021	Ultra City Smiths	The Most Dangerous Man in the World (voice)	6 episodes
2021	Summer Camp Island	Poppa Woppa McCallister (voice)	2 episodes
2021–2022	Bloods	Lawrence	16 episodes
2021–2023	The Great	Dr. Vinodel	9 episodes
2022	The Witchfinder	Dennis	1 episode
2022	Dodger	M	1 episode
2023	The Following Events Are Based on a Pack of Lies	Benjy Dhillon	5 episodes
2023	Bob's Burgers	Ian	Episode: "The (Raccoon) King and I"
2024	Knuckles	Jack Sinclair	2 episodes
2024	Extraordinary	George	6 episodes
2024	Super Happy Magic Forest	Hoofius	1 season
2025	We Baby Bears	Monkey	1 episode
2026	Kill Jackie	Tucker	

=== Stage ===
Year	Title	Role	Notes
1998	The Mighty Boosh	Howard Moon / Various	Edinburgh Fringe Festival
1999	Arctic Boosh	Howard Moon / Various	Edinburgh Fringe Festival and Melbourne International Comedy Festival
2000	Autoboosh	Howard Moon / Various	Edinburgh Fringe Festival and Melbourne International Comedy Festival
2006	The Mighty Boosh	Howard Moon / Various	Tour; 55 shows
2008–2009	The Mighty Boosh Live: Future Sailors Tour	Howard Moon / Various	Tour; 91 shows
2011	The Government Inspector	The Mayor	Young Vic Theatre
2012	NSFW	Aidan	Royal Court

== Awards ==
- 2022 The Great nominated Outstanding Performance by an Ensemble Cast in a Comedy Series 28th Screen Actors Guild Awards.
- 2019 Killing Eve nominated Best Guest Actor in a Drama Series Online Film and Television Awards, Killing Eve 2018.
- 2016 Mindhorn nominated Best Debut Screenwriter British Independent Film Awards 2016.
- 2014 ABCs of Death 2 nominated Audience Choice Award Chicago International Film Festival.
- 2010 The Mighty Boosh won Best Live Show with Future Sailors at the Shockwaves NME Awards 2010.
- 2009 The Mighty Boosh won Best TV Show at the Shockwaves NME Awards 2009
- 2008 The Mighty Boosh won Best TV Show at the Shockwaves NME Awards 2008.
- 2007 The Mighty Boosh won Best TV Show at the Shockwaves NME Awards 2007.
- 2001 The Boosh, first on London Live, then on Radio 4.
- 2000 Arctic Boosh won the Barry Award at the Melbourne International Comedy Festival
- 1999 Perrier nominee with Noel Fielding as Arctic Boosh
- 1998 Perrier Best Newcomer winner with Noel Fielding as the double act The Mighty Boosh
- 1995 Won BBC New Comedy Award
- 1995 Won Open Mic Award, Edinburgh
