= Steve Oram =

English actor, comedian, writer, and filmmaker (born 1973)

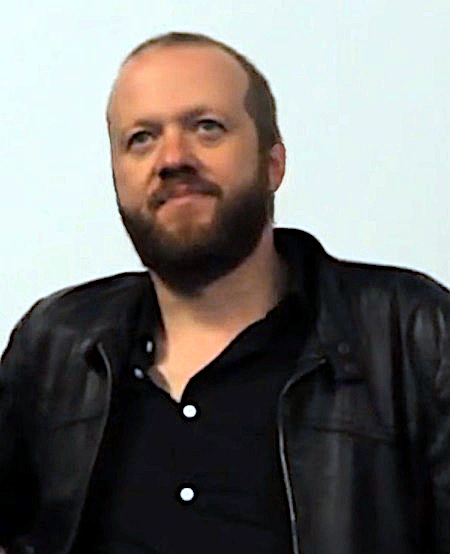
- Steve Oram at Sightseers Premiere at the 2012 Dublin Film Festival
- Born: Stephen John Oram; 1973 (age 52–53); Melton Mowbray, Leicestershire, England
- Occupations: Actor; comedian; writer; filmmaker
- Years active: 2001–present

Stephen John Oram (born 1973) is an English actor, comedian, writer, and filmmaker. He is known for his role in the 2012 film Sightseers, which he also co-wrote. His other credits include People Like Us (2001), It's All Gone Pete Tong (2004), Tittybangbang (2006–2007), Suburban Shootout (2006), The Mighty Boosh (2007), Connections (2008), The World's End (2013), Wipers Times (2013), The Secrets (2014), The Canal (2014), Altar (2014), Paddington (2014), Glue (2014), Aaaaaaaah! (2015), The Living and the Dead (2016), A Dark Song (2016), The End of the F***ing World (2017–2019), Ghosts (2019), Doctor Who (2021), Killing Eve (2022), and D.I Ray (2022–2023).

== Life and career ==
Oram was born in 1973, in Melton Mowbray, Leicestershire, England. He studied at the University of East Anglia, taking degrees in both English and film.

== Career ==
He started as a character comedian on the comedy circuit and performed several comedy shows at the Edinburgh Fringe with comedy partner Tom Meeten during the early 2000s. He also appeared at Ealing Live, a comedy night at Ealing Studios, where he met and started working with Alice Lowe.

In 2002, Oram and Meeten wrote, composed the music and starred in Channel 4's Matthew & Tone: Tales of Friendship and Innocence. It was directed by Dominic Brigstocke and screened in season 5 of the Comedy Lab series.

Oram appeared in various TV & film roles throughout the 2000s including the second series of People Like Us (2001), the feature film It's All Gone Pete Tong (2004) starring Paul Kaye, Tittybangbang (2006–07) and Suburban Shootout (2006). He also played Donnie the tramp in the series written by and starring Julian Barratt and Noel Fielding, series 3 of The Mighty Boosh (2007).

In 2008, his short film Connections screened at Cannes Film Festival as part of the official Straight 8 selection.

He also appeared alongside Alice Lowe as a support act in Steve Coogan's 2008–09 stand up tour "Steve Coogan is.....Alan Partridge and other less successful characters".

Oram has written and directed numerous short films under the pseudonym "Steve Aura" and released under the banner of Lincoln Studios.

With Meeten, he performs a long-running comedy show in London called Oram & Meeten's Club Fantastico.

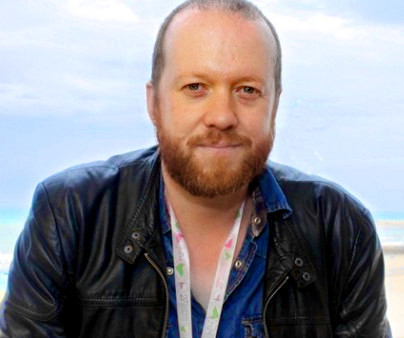
Oram at Mar del Plata Film Festival (2013)

In 2012, Oram and Lowe starred in Ben Wheatley's dark comedy Sightseers. The film was written by Oram and Lowe with additional material by Amy Jump.

Since then, Oram has taken on roles in films including Edgar Wright and Simon Pegg's The World's End (2013), The Canal (2014), Altar (2014) and Paddington (2014).

On television, he has appeared in Wipers Times (2013) written by Ian Hislop and Nick Newman, an episode of The Secrets (2014) alongside Alison Steadman and Olivia Colman, an episode of Noel Fielding's Luxury Comedy (2014), the Jack Thorne series Glue (2014) and The Living and the Dead (2016).

Oram released his directorial debut Aaaaaaaah! in 2015, a film in which the characters communicate entirely in ape-like grunts. It starred Oram himself alongside Julian Barratt, Toyah Willcox, Julian Rhind-Tutt, Noel Fielding and Holli Dempsey. The film's soundtrack features a number of tracks from the King Crimson ProjeKcts albums.

In 2016, he starred as Joseph Solomon in A Dark Song.

In 2019, he appeared as Terry in the BBC series Ghosts.

== Filmography ==
=== Film ===
Year	Title	Role	Notes
2002	Ant Muzak	Marco	Short film
2004	It's All Gone Pete Tong	Blinky	
2005	The Wingnut Tapes	Dad	Short film. Co-writer
2008	Connections	Man	Short film; Writer/director
2011	Kill List	Radio Reporter	
2012	Sightseers	Chris	Also co-writer
2013	Welcome to the Punch	Journalist	
2013	The World's End	Motorcycle Policeman	
2014	The Last Summer On Earth	Ginger Goofball	Short film. Co-writer
2014	Cuban Fury	Security guard Kevin	
2014	The Canal	McNamara	
2014	Altar	Nigel Lean	
2014	Paddington	Paddington Station Security Guard	
2015	Captain Webb	Professor Fred Beckwith	
2015	The Bad Education Movie	Officer Rowe	
2015	Aaaaaaaah!	Smith	Writer / Director
2015	Sarah Chong Is Going To Kill Herself	The Bosses	Short film
2016	A Dark Song	Joseph Solomon	
2018	In Fabric	Clive	
2022	This is Christmas	Conductor	
2022	Mind-set	Paul	
2023	Love Again	Richard Hughes	
2023	Sky Peals	Jeff	

=== Television ===
Year	Title	Role	Notes
2001	People Like Us	Policeman/Sound Engineer	
2002	Live Floor Show	Mr Richards	
2002	Hardware	Builder	
2002	Green Wing	Security Guard	
2002	Comedy Lab: Matthew & Tone: Tales of Friendship and Innocence	Tone	
2005	Twisted Tales	Detective Sergeant Jack Tanner	Episode: "Death Metal Chronicles"
2005	Comedy Lab: Skin Deep	Carl	
2006	Suburban Shootout	Plumber	
2006–2007	Tittybangbang	Various characters	
2007	Where Are the Joneses?	Carston Whelk	
2007	The Mighty Boosh	Donni	The Strange Tale of the Crack Fox
2008	LifeSpam: My Child is French	Various characters	
2011	Dick and Dom's Funny Business	Teacher	
2011	The Increasingly Poor Decisions of Todd Margaret	Officer Petty Hurt	
2012	Miranda	Policeman	
2013	Life's Too Short	Paul Jacobs	
2013	Heading Out	Daniel	
2013	The Wipers Times	Sergeant Harris	
2013	NTSF:SD:SUV::	Mr Smyth	
2014	The Job Lot	Keith Taylor	
2014	The Secrets	Shaun	The Dilemma
2014	Noel Fielding's Luxury Comedy	Terry	Series 2 Episode 2 Fantasy Block
2014	Glue	George	
2016	Midsomer Murders	Nathan Tonev	
2016	The Living and the Dead	John Roebuck	
2017	The Moorside	DC Alex Grummit	
2017–2019	The End of the F***ing World	Phil	
2018	Death in Paradise	Dean Shanks	S7:E3 "Written in Murder"
2018	Hang Ups	Neil Quinn	
2018	Sally4Ever	Mick	
2019	Ghosts	Terry	
2019	Not Going Out	Dave the builder	Series 10 (Episode 7)
2021	Line of Duty	Medical counsellor	Series 6 (Episode 7)
2021	Doctor Who	Joseph Williamson	Series 13
2022	Killing Eve	Phil	
2022–present	D.I Ray	DS Clive Bottomley	

== Awards and recognition ==
- 2012: Awarded Best Screenplay (with Alice Lowe) by British Independent Film Awards for Sightseers
- 2012: Nominated Best Actor by British Independent Film Awards for Sightseers
- 2012: Awarded Best Screenplay (with Alice Lowe) by Mar del Plata Film Festival for Sightseers
- 2012: Awarded Best Screenplay (with Alice Lowe) by Sitges Film Festival for Sightseers
- 2013: Nominated Best Male Newcomer by Empire Awards for Sightseers
- 2013: Awarded Breakthrough British Filmmaker (with Alice Lowe) by London Critics Circle Film Awards for Sightseers
- 2013: Nominated ALFS Award – British Actor of the Year by London Critics Circle Film Awards for Sightseers
- 2013: Nominated Best First Feature-Length Film Screenplay (with Alice Lowe) by Writers' Guild of Great Britain for Sightseers
- 2015: Nominated The Discovery Award by British Independent Film Awards for Aaaaaaaah!
- 2016: Special Jury Mention New Direction Competition by Cleveland International Film Festival for Aaaaaaaah!
