= My Best Friend's Girl =

My Best Friend's Girl may refer to:

- "My Best Friend's Girl" (song), a song by the Cars from the album The Cars (1978)
- "My Best Friend's Girl", a song by Steps from the album Steptacular (1999)
- My Best Friend's Girl (2008 film), a romantic comedy starring Dane Cook and Kate Hudson
- My Best Friend's Girl (1983 film), a film directed by Bertrand Blier
- My Best Friend's Girl (novel), a book by Dorothy Koomson

== See also ==
- My Best Friend's Girlfriend, a 2008 Filipino romantic comedy film
- "The Girl of My Best Friend", a song
