= Noel Fielding's Luxury Comedy =

- Series one intertitle
- Genre: Surreal comedy, new wave comedy
- Created by: Nigel Coan; Noel Fielding
- Written by: Nigel Coan; Noel Fielding
- Directed by: Nigel Coan; Noel Fielding
- Starring: Noel Fielding; Michael Fielding; Tom Meeten; Dolly Wells; Rich Fulcher; Richard Ayoade
- Opening theme: "Luxury Comedy Theme" by Loose Tapestries (Series 1); Variation of "Luxury Comedy Theme" by Loose Tapestries (Series 2–present)
- Composers: Sergio Pizzorno; Noel Fielding; Tim Carter
- Country of origin: United Kingdom
- Original language: English
- No. of series: 2
- No. of episodes: 12

Production
- Executive producer: Derrin Schlesinger
- Running time: 25 minutes
- Production company: Secret Peter

Original release
- Network: E4
- Release: 26 January 2012 – 28 August 2014

Related
- The Mighty Boosh; Bunny and the Bull

Noel Fielding's Luxury Comedy, known as Luxury Comedy 2: Tales from Painted Hawaii for series two, is a British surreal comedy television series written and directed by Noel Fielding and Nigel Coan. The initial format for the series changes after the first series, with series one being a surreal sketch show, and series two being a sitcom. The series stars Noel Fielding, his brother Michael Fielding, Tom Meeten, Dolly Wells, and occasionally Rich Fulcher, Dave Brown, and Richard Ayoade. The first episode premiered on 26 January 2012 on E4. The music for the first series was written by Noel Fielding and Kasabian's Sergio Pizzorno, a good friend of Fielding's, under the band name Loose Tapestries. The duo were joined for the second series by Kasabian touring member, Tim Carter.

It is described on the Channel 4 website as "a psychedelic character based comedy show half filmed and half animated". The first series started airing on 26 January 2012 and lasted for seven episodes. Channel 4 commissioned a second series, which started airing on E4 on 31 July 2014. The series format has switched from sketch show to sitcom, set mainly in a Hawaiian coffee shop. It features many new characters as well as the majority of characters from the first run. The series is given the subtitle Tales from Painted Hawaii.

== Plot ==
Each episode is structured around a plot involving Noel and his friends, accompanied by sketches featuring strange characters who are usually not connected to the main story. The first series is set in Noel's treehouse in a red and blue jungle, while the second series Tales from Painted Hawaii is set on a fictional island in Hawaii, where Noel runs a coffee shop. There are fewer sketches in the second series than in the first, with most of the character sketches being set around the Hawaiian island. During the second series, most episodes revolve around the characters having to complete a task before the end of the show.

== Characters ==
=== Main ===
- Noel (Series 1- ) Noel Fielding (playing an exaggerated version of himself) - Noel is portrayed as imaginative yet childlike and irresponsible. In the first series, he lives in a treehouse in a red and blue jungle, and dresses in elaborate costumes and brightly coloured face paint. In the second series, Noel is the manager of "Luxury Coffee", a coffee shop on a fictional island in Hawaii named "Painted Hawaii". He stops wearing face paint and wears the same costume, his Luxury Coffee uniform, in every episode of the second series. He is the lead singer in the band who perform the show's theme tune.
- Smooth (Series 1- ) (played by Michael Fielding) - Smooth is a grey human-anteater hybrid, describing himself as "mixed race" because his father is a human and his mother is an anteater. He often serves as the voice of reason and maturity, often pointing out the flaws in Noel's plans. He plays the bass guitar in the cast band and is also shown to play the double bass.
- Dolly (Series 1- ) (played by Dolly Wells) - Noel's friend and former girlfriend. She is a fashion model from Berlin, and is obsessed with fashion, art and the latest cultural trends. She is the drummer in the cast band.
- Warhol (Series 1- ) Andy Warhol (played by Tom Meeten) - An exaggerated version of the famous painter, who started out as Noel's cleaner in Series 1. In Series 2 he works in the coffee shop with Noel and Smooth. He talks and acts like a robot, with his voice mimicking a voice synthesiser, and he is often neurotic and insecure. A recurring joke in the second series includes Andy meeting with other famous artists, musicians and writers from the 20th century, such as George Orwell and Yoko Ono, for leisure activities. He plays the keyboard in the cast band.

=== Recurring ===
All characters listed are played by Noel Fielding, unless stated otherwise.

- Secret Peter (Series 1- ), Noel's landlord. He is a purple blob creature covered in multi-coloured crystals, and speaks and acts in a stereotypical East London dialect. He is named after the production company which makes the series.
- Roy Circles (Series 1- ), an anthropomorphic chocolate finger biscuit who works as a PE teacher and once served in the army (presumably in the Brigade of Guards). He has post-traumatic stress disorder and often talks about how depressed he is because his wife died.
- Sergeant Raymond Boombox (Series 1- ), an incompetent, obese New York cop with yellow skin and extensive facial hair and perm. In the first series, he tells stories of his past cases, and in the second series he serves as law enforcement on Painted Hawaii. He is an old friend of Smooth's and likes reggae music.
- The Gash (Series 1- ), a talking wound on Sergeant Raymond Boombox's left arm who often insults the Sergeant for his failures. He likes to devour credit cards and argues with a second gash on Boombox's stomach who does impressions of Michael Caine and Harry Dean Stanton.
- Hooper (Series 1- ) (voiced by Tom Meeten), assistant to Raymond Boombox. He never appears on screen but Boombox constantly shouts at him. According to The Gash he is having an affair with Boombox's wife and according to Boombox he was nearly gang-raped by sailors whilst on assignment in Miami after being mistaken for a prostitute.
- Tony Reason (Series 1- ), an anthropomorphic manta ray who lives in a fish tank across a bridge from Luxury Coffee. He works as a music producer and often talks about his past experiences with famous musicians such as Jim Morrison and Bon Jovi.
- Todd Lagoona (Series 1- ) (played by Richard Ayoade), an anthropomorphic hammerhead shark. He is Tony Reason's friend, a fellow music producer and sometimes appears in the same fish tank as Tony.
- Joey Ramone (Series 1, 2- ), a stop-motion, plasticine version of the punk rock star, portrayed with comically long legs, blue hair and no arms. The Joey Ramone sketches parody children's television programmes from the 1960s and 1970s, having stop-motion characters in front of an illustrated background, with a mild-mannered narrator commenting passively on everything that happens and speaking for each character. He was up for eviction back to reality when Painted Hawaii was made into a Reality television show.
- Fantasy Man (Series 1, 2- ), a superhero who goes on self-imposed quests in an electronic, operatic fantasy world similar in appearance to Tron. He rarely achieves his goals; often being snapped back into reality by a passer-by and getting into some sort of trouble for his delusional actions. His voice and mannerisms are a parody of Don Quixote. It is revealed his real name is Sandy, he is gluten intolerant and has a pet cat called 'The Dream Tiger' whom he employs as an improvised weapon when attacked by street thugs.
- Big Chief Woolabum Boomalackaway (Series 1, 2- ) (played by Tom Meeten), Fantasy Man's sidekick. He is a Native American chief who likes Rave music, wears a brightly coloured headdress made of household objects, and claims to be able to see up to fifteen minutes into the future. He is a parody of Tonto.
- Dondylion (Series 1- ), an anthropomorphic lion. In the first series he is held in a run-down zoo and is quickly driven insane by his small enclosure and poor living conditions. He keeps a framed photograph of David Lee Roth, which he talks to as if it were a real person and refers to as "The King of the Lions"'. He was killed off in Series 1 but still reappeared in Series 2.
- Doo Rag (Series 1- ) (played by Michael Fielding), a man with a bowl haircut and moustache, who dresses in blue racing leathers. He speaks in a soft American accent, and a tiny red race car occasionally drives across the white stripe in his hair. In the second series, Doo Rag works as a doctor in a "Coolness Clinic" (where people go for tests to see how cool they are) on Painted Hawaii.

=== Others ===
- Renny & Gaviskon (Series 1), French chefs who cook at high speeds and go on a trip to The Moon.
- Tip Baker (Series 1) (played by Rich Fulcher), a NASA spokesperson, who sits on a trapeze on the edge of space.
- The Moon (Series 1), a cameo appearance by The Mighty Boosh character.
- Daddy Push, a man with a giant winkle shell for a head. He appears exclusively in surreal sketches where he does not speak and engages in bizarre activities.
- Pelé (Series 1), a drawing of the football star that comes to life.
- Figo (Series 1) (played by Tom Meeten), a fruitfly that escapes from a drugs bust.
- John (Series 1), the zookeeper that abuses Dondylion.
- Daran Cache (Darren Cache) (Series 1), art critic with stationary for facial features.
- Lysergic Casserole (Series 1) played by Noel Fielding and Rich Fulcher. Californian 1960s psychedelic rock band that Noel listened to. They only ever released one album and took so much LSD that they have been trapped on a motorcycle circling inside a guitar case ever since.
- Diamondback (Series 1), a country-western singer with silver skin, a ginger mullet and moustache made from copper scouring pads and numerous small googly eyes all over his face, which he uses as percussion to his songs.
- Mrs Diamondback (Series 1), a pink plastic flamingo seen in some of the scenes.
- Jeremy Beautiful Chest (Series 1) (played by Dave Brown), a man with a large red heart on his chest.
- Ghost of A Flea (Series 1), a character based on William Blake's real life recital to a friend of a visitation from The Ghost of a Flea.
- God (Series 1- ) (played by Tom Meeten).
- William Jessop (Series 1) (played by Rich Fulcher), a lonely 100-year-old man who eats bug soup and summons creatures from other dimensions to party with.
- Little Chrissy, Claw, Spoon Snake & McCoy (Series 1), characters made of coloured paper that go to visit the Jelly Fox.
- Jelly Fox (Series 1), a super magic man who lives in a blue fabric castle and has special powers to grant wishes and give you what you need.
- John Travolta (Series 1), a drawing of the film star that stuffs bumper packs of crisps in the front of his shorts and eats them in a window.
- Frida Kahlo (Series 1) (played by Tom Meeten), Andy Warhol's friend who appears to fill in as a cleaner while he's supposedly on holiday.
- Hawkeye (Series 1), a machine used to decide if Dolly's idea was a joke or a concept.
- King Tutta (Series 1), a mountain which tuts at Noel from afar, alongside two other mountains (played by Jimmy Lazer and Dave Brown).
- Dee Dee Ramone (Series 1), a stop-motion, plasticine version of the punk rock star.
- Colin Montgomery (Series 1), a stop-motion, plasticine version of the golfer.
- The Bobbatron (Series 1), a schizophrenic police officer in reality, and a flag guarding a bridge in the fantasy world.
- Golden Needle (Series 1) (played by Dolly Wells), used to stitch up the hole in the internet
- Sugar Bone Thompson (Series 1), a stiff brim hat used to warn Noel of someone stealing his Fab Lollies, whom Dolly falls for.
- City Gent (Series 1) (played by Richard Ayoade), an extremely dapper, well spoken businessman who begins each of his sketches by decrying the state of modern art, education and other intellectual topics, before abruptly blaming all their shortcomings on other characters.
- Ice Cream Eyes (Series 1), a man with black skin, long blonde hair and strawberry and vanilla ice cream scoops in place of eyes, who often gets blamed by City Gent for the state of the aforementioned topics.
- Tony Coins (Series 1), a mafiosi-esque man who lives in a till and has piles of coins in place of eyes. Ice Cream Eyes passes the blame on to him after being blamed by City Gent.
- Adam Printout (Series 1), a printed sheet of paper with holes for eyes who speaks with a timid Northern accent. He is blamed by Tony Coins, but claims he was drinking weak tea and eating a lemon slice and passes it on to Eugene Secret Note Passed Under the Door.
- Eugene Secret Note Passed Under The Door (Series 1), a man with cut out letters from magazines and newspapers on his face, who speaks in panicked nonsense after getting blamed by Adam Printout.
- Martin Rogers (Series 1), monkey with flashing head and wrist bands, who accuses Noel of touching him.
- Dolphin Bomber (Series 1), a sketched dolphin in a bomber plane.
- The Audience (Series 1), a strange, laughing clown, who speaks entirely in short statements on matters concerning mashed potato and fish fingers. His stomach contains a series of cogs and gears that processes mashed potatoes into life shapes.
- Ian Guage (Series 1), a man with a seemingly deformed face, who sings in a nonsense language which may be a parody of French.
- Count Ziggenpuss (Series 1), a fish-finger jewellery thief whose calling card is a single steaming baked bean on a golden spoon.
- Ravi (Series 1), a monkey seen with Dondylion, who allegedly cannot talk but can write. He is asked to write a postcard to Dondylion's family.
- Donald Nevereach (Series 1), a bomb who gets dropped by Dolphin Bomber and explodes in Sergeant Raymond Boombox's hands.
- Alfie (Series 1), a talking pineapple who has Noel's eyes.
- The Brooklyn Ice Box Throttler (Series 1) (played by Michael Fielding), escapes and kills the Vice President.
- The Vice President (Series 1) (played by Tom Meeten), killed by The Brooklyn Ice Box Throttler.
- Allan Key (Series 1), opens the door for Dondylion to escape the zoo, played by Warhol.
- The Tiger with Chlamydia (Series 1), sketched character that passes on chlamydia with his large arrow penis.
- Kurt Russell (Series 1), catches chlamydia from The Tiger with Chlamydia.
- W. G. Disgrace (Series 1), gives Smooth Shin splints in the same method as The Tiger with Chlamydia.
- Kite Headed Ferry (Series 1), Bryan Ferry in kite form.
- Brian Eno Frisbee (Series 1), Brian Eno in Frisbee form.
- Helen Daniels (Series 1), a hedgehog with a screwdriver that clogs The Audience's stomach gears, and gets imprisoned in a potato waffle cage by Doo Cloth.
- Doo Cloth (Series 1), Doo Rag's friend that traps Helen Daniels in a potato waffle cage.
- Burnt Sausage (Series 1) (played by Joey Page), the burnt sausage that sets fire to the show in the last episode of Series 1.
- Tutankhamun (Series 1), this character was not seen in the televised episodes but appeared in the Outtakes of Series 1.
- Paul Panfer (Series 2), a blue surfing Panther that is an internet sensation.
- Terry (Series 2) (played by Steve Oram), the only Luxury Comedy viewer. He is killed by an asteroid.
- Fantasy Block (Series 2) (played by Dave Brown), a Michelin Man shaped creature that smashes Noel's creative ideas with his two gold mallets as in a game of Whac-A-Mole.
- Reality Man (Series 2) (played by Richard Ayoade), he attempts to turn Noel's show into a reality show, due to not liking fantasy, but fails.
- George Orwell (Series 2) (played by Simon Farnaby), Andy Warhol's salsa dancing friend.
- Geometric Box Fish (Series 2) (played by Dave Brown), a rare fish who's a pyromaniac disaffected youth.
- The Head Cucumber of Cool (Series 2) (played by Rich Fulcher), captain of a spaceship from a cool planet, searching the galaxy to destroy the uncool.
- Francis Cucumber of Cool (Series 2) (played by Stuart Silver), second cucumber in command.
- Cucumber of Cool (Series 2) (played by Barunka O'Shaughnessy), cucumber operator of "The Machine".
- Yoko Ono (Series 2) (played by Michael Fielding), plays Conkers with Andy Warhol.
- Noel Rain (Series 2), a version of Noel trapped in one of Andy Warhol's tears.
- Alison Mosshart (Series 2), a stop-motion, plasticine version of the musician.
- Jamie Hince (Series 2), a stop-motion, plasticine version of the musician.
- Slash (Series 2), a stop-motion, plasticine version of the musician.
- Plasticine Police (Series 2), a stop-motion, plasticine policemen who maintain order on the part of the Painted Hawaii island that's made of plasticine.
- Danny Bullet (Series 2) (played by Arnab Chanda), Noel's Los Angeles agent.
- Airline Hostess (Series 2) (played by Tanya Wade), works on Didier Drogba's Learjet.
- Plasticine Iggy Pop (Series 2), a stop-motion, plasticine version of the musician.
- Plasticine Captain Birdbrain (Series 2), a stop-motion, plasticine ship's captain.
- Plasticine Punk Rock Whale (Series 2), a stop-motion, plasticine whale.
- Mr. O'Sullivan (Series 2) (played by Tom Meeten), a TV snooker player.
- Bathroom Policeman (Series 2) (played by Kim Noble), wonders how he will explain Mr. Fantasy and Big Chief in the tub to his wife.
- Greg Somebodyorother (aka Pinocchio) (Series 2) (played by Joey Page), appears inside Punk Rock Whale.

== Episode list ==
=== Series 1 (2012) ===
No. overall	No. in series	Title	Directed by	Original release date
1	1	"Pelé"	Nigel Coan and Noel Fielding	26 January 2012
A mystery package arrives which turns out to be Secret Pieces cereal sent by Noel's Landlord Secret Peter. French chefs Renny and Gaviskon take 'a Trip to the Moon'. Roy Circles talks about his transport home from School and gets the Swingball Blues. Sgt. Raymond has an anecdote about his failed drugs bust in Miami where Figo escapes. Dondylion talks about his missing penis and zoo food before having a claustrophobic attack. Daddy Push dances to Sherlock. Noel frames his felt tip drawing of Pelé holding a china tea cup. "Is it the ball, or is it the saucer for the cup?" After blowing Andy's mind and viewing by Daran Cache, Roy Circles accuses Noel of tracing the drawing which leads to Pelé coming to life. Characters in order of appearance: Noel, Smooth, Secret Peter, Renny, Gaviskon, Tip Baker, The Moon, Pelé, Daddy Push, Sgt. Raymond Boombox, The Gash, Figo, Dondylion, John, Dolly, Warhol, Daran Cache (credited Darren Cache).
2	2	"The Jelly Fox"	Nigel Coan and Noel Fielding	2 February 2012
Noel helps Lysergic Casserole escape their own guitar case using a ramp made of Ryvita. Tony Reason talks about his producing pouch. Diamondback gives us a tune from the Pet Shop. Daddy Push tries his hand at origami. Noel paints a picture with the help of Jeremy. Noel and Dolly argue about whether things are a "concept" or a joke. God and the Flea crashes a 100th birthday party. Warhol goes on holiday or does he? Dolly paints Noel's face. Four characters made of paper cutouts visit the Jelly Fox, "he'll give them what they need". Characters in order of appearance: Noel, Smooth, Lysergic Casserole, Tony Reason, Diamondback, Jeremy Beautiful Chest, Doo Rag, Ghost of A Flea, God, William Jessop, Warhol, Little Chrissy, Claw, Spoon Snake, McCoy, Dolly, Hawkeye.
3	3	"King Tutta"	Nigel Coan and Noel Fielding	9 February 2012
Noel gets angry with King Tutta, tutting at him from afar. Joey loses his legs, Colin Montgomery uses the left one to win the Masters. Noel uses his typewriter to make characters travel "by television". Roy Circles talks about his army present. Fantasy Man runs into The Bobbatron on the way to seal up a crack in the internet. Dolly falls for Sugar Bone Thompson the Fab watching Hat, Daddy Push chops onions. City Gent blames a lack of art contribution on Ice Cream Eyes. Characters in order of appearance: Noel, Smooth, King Tutta, Joey Ramone, Dee Dee Ramone, Colin Montgomery, Dolly, Warhol, Jeremy Beautiful Chest, Fantasy Man, Big Chief Whoolabum Boomalackaway, The Bobbatron, Golden Needle, Sugar Bone Thompson, City Gent, Ice Cream Eyes, Tony Coins, Adam Printout, Eugene Secret Note Passed Under The Door.
4	4	"The Phone Cake"	Nigel Coan and Noel Fielding	16 February 2012
Noel wears a flashing headband and wins a speedboat made of bananas. Joey Ramone has a costume mix up at the beach. Smooth tricks people by making cakes that look like a phone. Roy Circles is upset about being banned from Christmas. Tony Reason has a special way to cut the tension and argues with his cleaner. City Gent blames a lack of stage production on Ice Cream Eyes. Fantasy Man searches for the Dream Tiger. Characters in order of appearance: Noel, Martin Rogers, Secret Peter, Joey Ramone, Joey Ramone's Mother, Smooth, Roy Circles, Warhol, Tony Reason, City Gent, Ice Cream Eyes, Cleaner, Fantasy Man
5	5	"Mash Potato Utopia"	Nigel Coan and Noel Fielding	23 February 2012
Flash Liechi jumps 10 Weetabix. The Audience creates a mash potato revolver. Roy Circles talks about South Africa. Daddy Push finds a remote control for a box of chicken. Secret Peter finds Alan Hansen in his peg bag. Sgt. Boombox anecdotes the 'Toffee Apple Diamond Heist'. An ice cream van disrupts a tennis match. City Gent blames a lack of education on Ice Cream Eyes, who in turn isn't impressed with being covered in peas. Ravi writes a postcard home for Dondylion. Sgt. Boombox is blown up by Donald Nevereach. Characters in order of appearance: Noel, Smooth, Dolphin Bomber, The Audience, Doo Rag, Roy Circles, Daddy Push, Ian Guage, Secret Peter, Squirrel, Sgt. Raymond Boombox, The Gash, Count Ziggenpuss, Dondylion, Ravi, Donald Nevereach
6	6	"Tiger with Chlamydia"	Nigel Coan and Noel Fielding	1 March 2012
Two Warhols appear and argue over which is the real one. Joey has a reaction to Grandma's oatcakes. Sgt. Raymond Boombox explains the reason behind his perm. Dondylion escapes the zoo to avoid Lionaids. The Tiger with Chlamydia causes chaos. Diamondback heads to Tesco Metro. Tony borrows Todd's Jeep to pick up the kids. Characters in order of appearance: Noel, Alfie, Warhol, Tony Reason, Joey Ramone, Grandma, Sgt Raymond Boombox, The Gash, The Brooklyn Ice Box Throttler, The Vice President, Dondylion, Alan Key, The Tiger with Chlamydia, Kurt Russell, Diamondback, Mrs Diamondback, Todd Lagoona, Roy Circles, Dolly, W. G. Disgrace
7	7	"BBQ Breakdown"	Nigel Coan and Noel Fielding	8 March 2012
Two Brians cause division which leads to a fight. Helen Daniel's puts a screwdriver in The Audience's works, Doo Cloth comes to the rescue. Joey is late for a gig. Fantasy Man finds the Promised Land with help from the Dream Tiger. Noel has a BBQ Breakdown and causes a fire, this in turn causes panic. Eventually the entire show burns done, leaving a pile of ash two days later. All characters are left in black limbo to sing the closing theme a-cappella. Characters in order of appearance: Noel, Smooth, Kite Headed Ferry, Brian Eno Frisbee, Tony Reason, The Audience, Doo Rag, Helen Daniels, Doo Cloth, Warhol, Joey Ramone, Fantasy Man, Narrator, Dolly, City Gent, Ice Cream Eyes, Roy Circles, Burnt Sausage (Full character appearance in end scene - including Tutankhamun)

=== Series 2 (2014) ===
No. overall	No. in series	Title	Directed by	Original release date
8	1	"Paul Panfer"	Nigel Coan and Noel Fielding	31 July 2014
The cast of Magnum P.I. try to sacrifice Noel to a volcano. All hopes of being rescued rest on Paul Panfer, an internet sensation who remakes Elvis films on his mobile phone. Characters in order of appearance: Noel, Smooth, Dolly, Warhol, Paul Panfer, Secret Peter, Magnum Pi, Tony Reason, Sergeant Raymond Boombox.
9	2	"Saving Terry"	Nigel Coan and Noel Fielding	7 August 2014
Noel gets fantasy block if he doesn't overcome this and write an ending to the show, Terry, his only viewer, will be killed by an asteroid Characters in order of appearance: Noel, Dolly, Smooth, Warhol, Terry, Roy Circles, Todd Lagoona, Tony Reason, Fantasy Block, Sergeant Raymond Boombox, Fantasy Man, Big Chief Whoolabum Boomalackaway.
10	3	"Reality Man"	Nigel Coan and Noel Fielding	14 August 2014
Noel's show is turned into a reality TV programme by fantasy terrorist Reality Man. Noel is evicted back to reality and gets a job working in a greasy spoon café. Luckily for Noel, Fantasy Man and Big Chief Woolabum are on hand to help, and hopefully save the day. Characters in order of appearance: Noel, Dolly, Smooth, Warhol, Reality Man, Todd Lagoona, Tony Reason, Ray Boombox, Roy Circles, Joey Ramone (appearance only), George Orwell, Joey Ramone (narrator), Fantasy Man, Big Chief Whoolabum Boomalackaway
11	4	"Cucumbers of Cool"	Nigel Coan and Noel Fielding	21 August 2014
Noel realises he is the only person in the show who isn't cool. He has until the end of the episode to become cool, otherwise he will be destroyed by a race of alien cucumbers who all worship the poet John Gay. Characters in order of appearance: Noel, Dolly, Smooth, Warhol, Geometric Boxfish, Doo Rag, Cucumbers of Cool, Yoko Ono, Joey Ramone
12	5	"Joey and The Whale"	Nigel Coan and Noel Fielding	28 August 2014
Noel has until the end of the episode to boost the ratings from nine to twenty-five. If he doesn't manage to do it in time, his show will be axed and he and all his characters will be put into storage and, ultimately, incinerated. Characters in order of appearance: Noel, Warhol, Dolly, Smooth, Danny Bullet, Roy Circles, Joey Ramone, Iggy Pop, Captain Birdbrain, Ronnie O'Sullivan, Raymond Boombox, Secret Peter, Tony Reason, Todd Lagoona, Dondylion, Peggy + Aussie Family, Pinnochio/Greg Somethingorother, Fantasy Man, Big Chief Whoolabum Boomalackaway, The Bobbatron

== Music ==
The show's soundtrack is provided by Fielding and close friend Sergio Pizzorno of rock band Kasabian, who formed the group Loose Tapestries to make music for the series. An album entitled Loose Tapestries Presents: the Luxury Comedy Tapes was released following the first series. Fielding and Pizzorno returned to create the soundtrack for series two with Kasabian guitarist, Tim Carter. The series one theme tune appears on the album as "Luxury Comedy" - a Hawaiian style variation of this theme tune is used for series two.

== Reception ==
Series 1 received mixed reviews, offering both high praise and scathing criticism.

The Guardian described it as a "neo-psychedelic riot of mirth that regurgitates decades of memories of broad, Technicolor TV entertainment from The Banana Splits onwards." Stephen Armstrong wrote in The Sunday Times that "Fielding grins down like a fiendish blend of Peter Gabriel, Syd Barrett, Samuel Beckett and a TV-age Antonin Artaud, unsettling and hypnotising in equal measure. In these dreary times it's as subversive as Bowie appearing on Tops of The Pops in a dress." Andy Johnson at Purple Revolver said that "if someone wanted to make TV for Salvador Dalí and Rene Magritte then Noel Fielding's Luxury Comedy would be it. The artwork, decadent use of colour and reckless abandonment of the rules of form is a delight to watch."

On the other hand, The Yorker said "The plots are too obscure to follow, so one is left with a lurid array of half-animated, half-real characters spouting phrases which seem to have been generated by flicking through the dictionary at random." The Scotsman said of Fielding: "as an absurdist comedian he's so painfully uninspired and laboured" and "I was left bewildered as to how anyone could ever fall for this charmless rubbish", and goes on to say "he patently thinks of himself as a mind-blowing surrealist bursting with astonishing ideas (A sentient chocolate finger! A Noo Yoik cop with a talking wound!). But in reality he's the tiresome equivalent of the unfunny office clown persistently proclaiming how mad he is."

Series 2 was rated 4/5 stars by the Daily Telegraph's Christopher Howse, who described it as "best watched drunk".

== International broadcast ==
In Australia, the first season commenced airing on ABC2 each Thursday at 10:30pm from 5 April 2012.
