= Holli Dempsey =

English actress (born 1990)

- Born: Holli Cara-Rhian Dempsey; 11 May 1990 (age 36)
- Years active: 2010–present
- Website: hollidempsey.com

Holli Cara-Rhian Dempsey (born 11 May 1990) is an English actress, writer and comedian. On television, she is known for her roles in the ITV drama The Ice Cream Girls (2013), the Channel 4 series Derek (2013–2014), the E4 series The Aliens (2016), and the Hulu series Harlots (2017–2019). Her films include Aaaaaaaah! (2015) and Dad's Army (2016).

== Early life ==
Dempsey is from East London. Her first experience of acting was in a school play, as Detective Bernstein in Little Shop of Horrors. Dempsey was trained in Joan Littlewood improvisation style as part of the junior group at Theatre Royal Stratford East.

== Career ==
In 2013, she had a regular role as Maureen Mulliganin in the TV series Breathless. In 2014, she appeared as Vicky for ten episodes of the Ricky Gervais comedy series Derek. In 2015, she appeared as Jolene in You, Me and the Apocalypse for a single episode: "Right in the Nuts".

In 2016, she played Holly in the TV series The Aliens, and appeared in ITV's Plebs. The same year, she was in 2016 film version of Dad’s Army. In 2016, she appeared in "Hated in the Nation", an episode of the anthology series Black Mirror.

In 2019, she appeared in After Life, then in 2020, she played a lead role as Emily Lacey in the TV series Harlots, alongside Samantha Morton. In 2020, she appeared in the BBC comedy Ghosts.

She has also appeared in an episode of BBC's Call the Midwife, as prostitute 'Bridget Cole', and ITV’s The Delivery Man (2015), and The Ice Cream Girls (2013), an ITV drama based on the novel by Dorothy Koomson. Dempsey also appears in the 2015 British comedy film Aaaaaaaah! directed by Steve Oram.

In 2021, Dempsey played the role of Grace Melbury in a BBC Radio 4 adaptation of the Thomas Hardy novel The Woodlanders. In 2022 and 2023, she took the lead role of Jess in three series of Matthew Broughton’s radio thriller Broken Colours.

== Filmography ==
=== Film ===
Year	Title	Role	Notes
2010	After Effects	Liz (Friend)	Short film. Credited as Holli Wood
2011	This Time Next Year	Jacqui Morgan	Video
2011	The Fighter's Ballad	The Fighter's Sister	
2012	Full Firearms	Bianca	
2013	Lost Girl	Tara Stokes	Short film
2014	A Wonderful Christmas Time	Charlotte	
2015	Aaaaaaaah!	Helen	
2015	Drift	Courtney	Short film
2016	Dad's Army	Vera	
2016	Donald Mohammed Trump	Campaign Helper	Short films
2017	Tom	Helen	Short films
2018	None of the Above	Cassie	Short films
2018	Songbird	Tara	Also known as Alright Now
2019	Londonstani	Mrs. Hancock	Short film
2019	A Guide to Second Date Sex	Bianca	
2020	A Christmas Carol	Fan (voice)	
2020	Ecstasy	Gary the Drug Dealer	Short film
2021	Evie: Evil Has a New Name	Evie	Premiered at Arrow Video FrightFest
2023	Bolan's Shoes	Zoe	
2024	Housewarming	Liz	Short film

=== Television ===
Year	Title	Role	Notes
2010	The Bill	Willow	Series 26; episodes 30 & 31: "Respect: Parts 1 & 2"
2011	Tracy Beaker Returns	Kali	Series 2; episode 11: "Snake Bite"
2011	Doctors	Titch	Series 13; episode 54: "Protection"
2011	Holby City	Alison Newton	Series 13; episode 48: "Night Cover"
2011	Doctor Who	Kelly	Series 6; episode 12: "Closing Time"
2012	Whitechapel	Elsa Durham	Series 3; episode 6
2012	Wizards vs Aliens	Meena	Series 1; episode 5: "Rebel Magic, Part 1"
2013	The Ice Cream Girls	Young Poppy Carlisle	Mini-series; episodes 1–3
2013	Big Bad World	Katie	Episode 4
2013	Breathless	Maureen Mulligan	Mini-series; episodes 1–6
2013–2014	Derek	Vicky	Series 1 & 2; 10 episodes
2014	New Worlds	Agnes	Mini-series; episodes 1–4
2015	Call the Midwife	Bridget Cole	Series 4; episode 4
2015	DCI Banks	Jodie Nash	Series 4; episode 1: "What Will Survive: Part 1"
2015	The Delivery Man	Claire Fisher	Episode 1: "Youth"
2015	You, Me and the Apocalypse	Jolene	Mini-series; episode 5: "Right in the Nuts"
2015	Jekyll and Hyde	Ginnie	Mini-series; episode 6: "Spring-Heeled Jack"
2016	The Aliens	Holly	Mini-series; episodes 1–3, 5 & 6
2016	Plebs	Alba	Series 3; episode 7: "The New Master"
2016	People Just Do Nothing	Atlantic Receptionist	Series 3; episode 2: "Record Deal"
2016	Black Mirror	Clara Meades	Series 3; episode 6: "Hated in the Nation"
2016	Blink	Herself - Contestant	Series 2; episode 2
2017–2019	Harlots	Emily Lacey	Main role. Series 1–3; 24 episodes
2019	Flack	Carly	Series 1; episode 2: "Summer"
2020	Endeavour	Jenny Tate	Series 7; episodes 1 & 3: "Oracle" & "Zenana"
2020	After Life	Plastic Surgery Woman	Series 2; episode 4
2020	The Alienist	Masie	Series 2; episode 6: "Angel of Darkness: Memento Mori"
2020	I Hate Suzie	Danielle	Series 1; episode 6: "Guilt"
2020	Ghosts	Isabelle	Series 2; episode 5: "The Thomas Thorne Affair"
2020–2022	The Emily Atack Show	Various characters	Series 1–3; 12 episodes
2022	Agatha Raisin	Chelsea / Samantha	Series 4; episode 2: "Love, Lies and Liquor"
2022	Murder in Provence	Delphine Jourdain	Episode 3
2023	Black Ops	Senior Nurse	Series 1; episode 1
2023	Mrs Sidhu Investigates	Amelie Cook	Episode 1: "Ripped"
2024	McDonald & Dodds	Lilith Wood	Series 4; episode 3: "Wedding Fever"
2024	Stags	Sam	Episode 1: "The Bath"
2024	Gut Punch	Viv	Mini-series. Also known as How to Break Up with Your Link
2024–2025	The Marlow Murder Club	DC Alice Hackett	Series 1 & 2; 10 episodes
2025	Grace	Sam Fordwater	Series 5; episode 2: "Dead at First Sight"
2025	Lynley	Emma Kilfoyle	Episode 4: "With No One as a Witness"

=== Video games ===
Year	Title	Role	Notes
2022	The Diofield Chronicle	Tremina Umbert (voice)	English versions
2022	Valkyrie Elysium	Valkyrie / Nora (voice)	English versions
