= Nigel Coan =

British animator, director, and writer

Nigel Coan is a British animator, director, and writer who contributed to the television series The Mighty Boosh and Noel Fielding's Luxury Comedy as well as the film Bunny and the Bull.

Coan first met Noel Fielding and fellow Boosh actor Dave Brown at Buckinghamshire Chilterns University College (now Buckinghamshire New University), where they lived and attended art school together. Along with his partner Ivana Zorn and their production company Nipple, Coan has produced work for companies such as Canon, Volvo, and Honda.

Coan was responsible for the animated sequences in The Mighty Boosh. With the Luxury Comedy series, he not only contributes animation but shares in the writing and directs episodes as well. He also directed the music video 'Can't Wait For Christmas' by The Loose Tapestries featuring Noel Fielding and Serge Pizzorno.
