= Loose Tapestries =

UK musical group

- Genres: Comedy; rock; new wave; psychedelic
- Years active: 2011–present
- Members: Noel Fielding; Sergio Pizzorno; Tim Carter

Loose Tapestries is an alternative music project consisting of Sergio Pizzorno (Kasabian), and comedian Noel Fielding. It was formed in 2012 to provide music for Noel Fielding's Luxury Comedy. Their first album, Loose Tapestries Presents the Luxury Comedy Tapes, was released on 2 March 2012 as a digital download, and made available as a very limited edition of 500 records for Record Store Day on 21 April 2012.

Kasabian touring members Ben Kealey and Tim Carter also worked on the album (with Carter credited at the end of the programme), while some of the designing was handled by regular Kasabian collaborator Aitor Throup.

Their second album, N.H.S., was released on 17 June 2016, and is the soundtrack from the show's second series, Noel Fielding's Luxury Comedy 2: Tales from Painted Hawaii, which began in July 2014. The album includes the track "Can't Wait For Christmas", which features a rap from Luther star Idris Elba, and which was originally released as a single in December 2015.

== Loose Tapestries Presents the Luxury Comedy Tapes ==
The album Loose Tapestries Presents the Luxury Comedy Tapes features music and audio snippets from Noel Fielding's Luxury Comedy. The music theme matches the psychedelic genre of the programme, being surreal and frequently described as "new wave".

=== Track listing ===
1. "Melon"
2. "Luxury Comedy Theme"
3. "The Decision"
4. "Eye ball Seesaw"
5. "Take Your Little Black Pants Off"
6. "Ghost of a Flea (Happy Birthday Song)"
7. "Surrounded by Shape Shifting Werewolves"
8. "Bing Bong Changes"
9. "The Jelly Fox Part 2"
10. "Me and My Flamingo"
11. "Moon Dog"
12. "Mash Potato Life Shapes"
13. "Spanish Brothers"
14. "Swing Ball Blues"
15. "Brown Hatted Son of a Bitch"
16. "The Jelly Fox Part 3"
17. "Strawberry Sunrise"
18. "The Adventures of Fantasy Man" (read by Ronnie O'Sullivan)
19. "Fantasy Man Theme"
20. "Alan Hansen's Peg Bag"
21. "Bye Bye Baby"

== N.H.S. ==
Loose Tapestries' second album N.H.S. features music and audio snippets from the television show Luxury Comedy 2: Tales from Painted Hawaii, as well as the single "I Can't Wait for Christmas", which features a rap by Idris Elba, and which was originally released in December 2015.

=== Track listing ===
1. "Boombox Adagio"
2. "Suck My Beans"
3. "Tales from Painted Hawaii"
4. "Paul Panfer"
5. "Live for the Night (Cocaine City)"
6. "Goblins"
7. "Saving Terry"
8. "Imagine a Mouse with Rulers for Legs"
9. "New York Cop"
10. "Don't Do Drugs"
11. "Hawaiian Stingray"
12. "In the Garden & The Cucumbers of Cool"
13. "Dr. Doorag"
14. "The Triangle Song"
15. "That Friday Feeling"
16. "Fantasy Zone"
17. "Fantasy vs. Reality"
18. "(I'd Rather Be) Plasticine"
19. "All Bleeding Coming Together"
20. "I Can't Wait for Christmas" (feat. Me Innit a.k.a. Idris Elba)"
