= Tom Meeten =

English actor and comedian

- Born: 30 April 1974 (age 52); Northampton, England, UK
- Education: Sheffield Hallam University
- Children: 2

Tom Meeten (born 30 April 1974) is an English comedian, actor and writer.

== Life and career ==
Meeten was born in Northampton. He graduated in 1996 from Sheffield Hallam University after studying Fine Arts. His performing career began in a comedy double act alongside Steve Oram, with whom he created three shows at the Edinburgh Festival, performed a monthly London live show Oram and Meeten's Club Fantastico with Waen Shepherd, Tony Way and Alice Lowe, and wrote and starred in Matthew and Tone: Tales of Friendship and Innocence for Channel 4.

He has appeared in many television comedies including The Mighty Boosh, Star Stories, Blunder (2006), Motherland, The IT Crowd, Detectorists, Miranda and Skins. He played numerous characters on the sketch show Noel Fielding's Luxury Comedy and toured with Fielding from 2014 to 2015. He has appeared in feature films Paddington, Aaaaaaaah! (directed by Oram), Tank 432, Prevenge, Burke and Hare, and Weekender.

He co-wrote and starred in Blunder, and wrote sketches for That Mitchell and Webb Look. In 2018 he was nominated for a BAFTA (Outstanding Debut by a British Writer, Director or Producer) for his role in producing on The Ghoul, a British psychological horror in which he also played the lead role.
