= Aaaaaaaah! =

2015 British horror comedy film

- Film poster
- Directed by: Steve Oram
- Produced by: Steve Oram; Andrew Starke
- Starring: Steve Oram; Tom Meeten; Julian Barratt; Toyah Willcox; Julian Rhind-Tutt; Noel Fielding; Holli Dempsey
- Cinematography: Matthew Wicks
- Edited by: Steve Oram
- Music by: King Crimson ProjeKcts; David Westlake
- Distributed by: Lincoln Studios; Rook Films Releasing
- Release date: 28 August 2015 (FrightFest)
- Running time: 79 minutes
- Country: United Kingdom

Aaaaaaaah! is a 2015 British horror comedy film conceived, directed, edited and produced by Steve Oram. The film contains no dialogue, with the cast communicating entirely in animalistic grunts. It premiered in August 2015 at London FrightFest Film Festival. In 2016 the film was released on DVD, Blu-ray and VOD on Icon Productions's Frightfest Presents label. The film has received a positive critical reception.

== Plot ==
Two men, Smith (Steve Oram) and Keith (Tom Meeten) arrive in a woodland clearing. Smith cries over a photograph of his estranged wife before he and Keith perform a ritual in which they urinate on the photograph. Keith dries Smith's eyes and penis and they head downhill towards a vast suburban sprawl.

In the Ryan family household, a young woman, Denise (Lucy Honigman), is preparing dinner with her mother, Barabara (Toyah Willcox). They watch a cookery show in which the topless host Carolla (Shelley Longworth) prepares a meat, potato and salt dinner. Barabara copies the recipe and tenderises a steak by bashing it on the kitchen door.

Smith and Keith arrive in town and decide to follow a scruffy man, Og (Sean Reynard) who masturbates in an underpass using a mouse. Smith and Keith rough him up and scare him. Og returns to his 'alpha', Ryan (Julian Rhind-Tutt) to tell him about these new threatening males, but Ryan gives him a beating and forces him to set up the new widescreen television. Ryan and Og sit down to play a motorbike game on the games console.

The family eats dinner, but Og tries to have sex with Denise and she leaves the room. In the kitchen she sees her father, Jupiter (Julian Barratt) looking sadly in at the kitchen window. She gives him a Battenburg cake and they share a tender moment before Jupiter returns to the garden where he now lives. He lies under a tree with his cake, a broken man.

We see a flashback of a previous time when Jupiter was the alpha male of the house. He serves a Sunday Roast human leg to Barabara, Denise and Og. But Og disrupts the happy scene by confronting him aggressively, an act that Jupiter fails to deal with properly. The washing machine breaks down and Barabara rounds on Jupiter also.

Back in the dinner room, the family eats pudding. Ryan initiates a food fight and covers Barabara with blancmange. Barabara retaliates and they have a huge fight. Denise storms out of the house, fed up with them all.

In the park Denise meets up with her streetwise cousin Helen (Holli Dempsey) and they drink vodka together. Helen has itchy VD and Denise suggests she pour vodka down her crotch which she does. They go shoplifting and are caught by a shop assistant, Carl (Noel Fielding). The shop manager (Waen Shepherd) interrogates them in the basement and masturbates in front of them before falling asleep on his desk. Carl then gets Helen to give him a blow job, but Helen bites his penis off. The girls flee with some money from the cash box.

A debauched party is now going on at the Ryan house. Denise and Helen return and flaunt the money they stole in front of Ryan, but he is paralytic on drink and drugs and passes out. Smith and Keith arrive at the party and piss on the walls, scent marking it. They graffiti Ryan's sleeping face, then Keith rests his testicles on Ryan's head and Smith photographs it on Ryan's phone, which he returns to Ryan's pocket. Smith and Keith disrupt the party and Smith has sex with Denise in the bathroom.

Smith, Keith and Denise leave the party. They break into an unoccupied house where Smith & Denise perform a 'wedding' ritual to celebrate their union.

Next morning Ryan awakes, hungover and graffitied. He smokes outside and Jupiter laughs at his face.

We see another flashback which charts Jupiter's fall from 'alpha' status. Barabara and Ryan, the washing machine repair man, flirt. Ryan then forms an alliance with Og before Ryan and Barabara have sex on top of the washing machine in front of Jupiter. Ryan and Og then beat Jupiter senseless, goaded on by Barabara, while Denise looks on distraught.

Ryan sees the photograph on his phone of Keith's testicles resting on his head and is furious. He and Og head out on the warpath and clash with Smith and Keith on some waste ground. Keith is stabbed by Og before Smith chases Og, smashing his head on the ground and killing him. Smith then rips Ryan's arm off and leaves him for dead.

Smith and Denise return to the house. Smith smashes up the kitchen in a display to convince Barabara of his new alpha status, but she is unconvinced. He tries to have sex with her but cannot get it up and Barabara laughs at him. Smith collects Keith's body and gives him a 'funeral' before placing his corpse in the wheelie bin. Barabara is also unimpressed by this.

Smith invites Jupiter into the house and tries to involve him in the new 'family' group, but Jupiter only manages to wet his pants before sitting alone repeatedly watching an inane children's TV show involving an animated chicken. Smith repairs the house and gradually begins to win Barabara over. They all sit down to watch a sitcom starring two big comedy stars (Tony Way and Alice Lowe) which features slo-mo action replays of lame pratfalls. They all enjoy it and Jupiter seems to get his 'voice' back. This delights Denise and they seem to be a happy 'family' at last.

In the night Jupiter stabs Barabara, Smith and Denise to death, then sits back down to watch the animated chicken on TV.

== Cast ==
- Steve Oram as Smith
- Tom Meeten as Keith
- Lucy Honigman as Denise
- Julian Barratt as Jupiter
- Holli Dempsey as Helen
- Toyah Willcox as Barabara
- Shelley Longworth as Carolla
- Sean Reynard as Og
- Julian Rhind-Tutt as Ryan
- Noel Fielding as Carl
- Alice Lowe as Sitcom Eudora
- Tony Way as Sitcom Lee
- Waen Shepherd as Manager

== Production ==
The film was shot over two weeks during the summer of 2014. The film's soundtrack features a number of tracks from the King Crimson ProjeKcts albums.

== Reception ==
The critical reception has been positive, with review aggregator Rotten Tomatoes giving it a rating of 79% based on 14 reviews. The film went on to receive a British Independent Film Awards Nomination, as well as a special jury mention at Cleveland International Film Festival.
