= The S.L.P. =

Solo musical project of Serge Pizzorno

- Genres: Alternative dance, rock
- Years active: 2019–present
- Spinoff of: Kasabian
- Members: Sergio Pizzorno
- Website: www.the-slp.com

THE S.L.P. is the solo musical project of Serge Pizzorno, the guitarist and lead songwriter of the rock band Kasabian. The name comes from the initials of his full name, Sergio Lorenzo Pizzorno. Its debut single, "Favourites", featured rapper Little Simz. It was released 14 May 2019, debuting on BBC Radio 1's Future Sounds with Annie Mac.

The second single, "Nobody Else", was released 20 June 2019 and also debuted on BBC Radio 1's Future Sounds with Annie Mac. At the same time a headline tour of the UK and Europe was announced, including two shows at London's EaRTh and concerts in Italy, Germany, and The Netherlands.

Pizzorno conceived the project while Kasabian was on a one-year hiatus, when he found himself wanting to explore the "extreme sides of my personality" as "an outlet to keep me sane". He recorded and produced the 11-track album himself at his Leicester studio. Released on 30 August 2019, it also includes a collaboration with Slowthai.

The track "Favourites" arose from a feeling of being troubled by the falseness of the way people present themselves on social media, in an age when, as he told Annie Mac, 'most people are pretending to be somebody else through their online persona.' The video, released at the end of May 2019 and promoted by MTV, DIY, NME, and others, was directed by designer Aitor Throup using a new time-remapping technique Throup developed.

== Discography ==
=== Studio albums ===
- The S.L.P. (2019) No. 7 UK Albums Chart

=== Singles ===
- "Favourites" featuring Little Simz (2019)
- "Nobody Else" (2019)
- "The Youngest Gary" (2019)
- "((trance))" (2019)
