= A Dark Song =

- Theatrical release poster
- Directed by: Liam Gavin
- Written by: Liam Gavin
- Starring: Steve Oram; Catherine Walker
- Cinematography: Cathal Watters
- Music by: Ray Harman
- Distributed by: Kaleidoscope Film Distribution
- Release date: 8 July 2016 (Galway Film Fleadh)
- Running time: 100 minutes
- Countries: Ireland, UK
- Language: English

A Dark Song is a 2016 Irish-British independent horror film, written and directed by Liam Gavin and starring Steve Oram and Catherine Walker. It was released to select theatres and digital streaming platforms on 28 April 2017. It is Gavin's directorial debut.

== Plot ==
A bitter and grieving Sophia Howard rents an isolated house in rural Wales to convince short-tempered occultist Joseph Solomon to lead her in a gruelling, months-long rite dictated from The Book of Abramelin to summon her guardian angel, whom Sophia can then ask to speak with her dead seven-year-old son. Solomon explains that once they begin, if they leave the house before the ritual is finished, they will be in grave peril, and that Sophia must endure months of punishing exercises in which they will deal with real demons and angels. She agrees. She then complies with dozens of painful, harrowing exercises, but refuses to do the forgiveness ceremony. To compensate for her refusal, Solomon insists she must drink his blood, and also says they must have sex as part of the ritual. After manipulating her into taking off her clothes, he masturbates, then tells her it was just for his own release, not for ritualistic purposes. Sophia gets revenge by urinating in his breakfast the next day.

They begrudgingly get to know one another over time. However, after months, a frustrated Sophia complains that it’s taking too long, and Solomon accuses her of impairing the ritual by not being honest about something. She admits that the real favour she will ask the angel is revenge upon whoever kidnapped and killed her son. That night he awakens her and says that because her dishonesty has made her impure, a re-birthing ritual in the tub is required. However, he drowns her, recites a spell, and revives her with CPR. Angered, she pushes him and he accidentally falls on a large kitchen knife, impaling him in the side. As she treats the wound with their meagre medical supplies, he explains that this is a sign that the ritual is beginning to work, and that she will have her revenge. He discloses that he will ask the angel to make him invisible for the rest of his life, to be away from people as he “want[s] some quiet before the howl.”

As Solomon soldiers on with the wound, Sophia begins seeing and hearing menacing presences in the house, including the voice of her son. When Solomon's wound becomes infected, he begins to fail and eventually dies in his sleep. When Sophia goes back to his books for further instruction, everything has been crossed out, unreadable. She steps beyond the perimeter of the house but her car won't start. After walking down an empty road, she is disturbed to realise that she has arrived back at the mansion.

She re-enters to discover various demons appearing. They drag her to the basement, torment her, and cut off a finger as she tells them how sorry she is. They retreat as a brilliant white light fills the house. She finds a massive, beatific angel in armour awaiting her. She asks it for the power to forgive, and it smiles. Later, she performs a water burial of Solomon, then drives away.

== Cast ==
- Steve Oram – Joseph Solomon
- Catherine Walker – Sophia Howard
- Mark Huberman – Neil Hughes
- Susan Loughnane – Victoria Howard
- Nathan Vos - Jack

== Release ==
A Dark Song premiered 8 July 2016 at the Galway Film Fleadh in Ireland, and was shown at the 2016 Fantastic Fest, the 2016 BFI London Film Festival and the 2016 Boston Underground Film Festival. It was released on 28 April 2017 in select theatres, video on demand and via digital streaming platforms.

== Reception ==
The film received mostly positive reviews. On review aggregator Rotten Tomatoes, it holds a 90% approval rating based on 41 reviews, with a rating average of 7.2/10. Its consensus reads: "A Dark Song offers atmospheric, unsettling horror — and marks writer-director Liam Gavin as one to watch."

Tara Brady of The Irish Times called it "a nifty, novel Irish horror." Stephen Dalton of The Hollywood Reporter wrote that the film is a "classy effort throughout, from cinematographer Cathal Watters' beautiful vistas of the rugged Welsh landscape to Ray Harman's spare, brooding, dread-filled score. Oram's typically sour, surly, slyly comic performance also grounds the plot in a grubby realism that serves its more fantastical elements well." Haleigh Foutch of Collider wrote, "A Dark Song spins many webs of mystery and keeps you puzzling out every mystery up until the audacious ending you definitely won't see coming."

Scott Weinberg of Nerdist wrote, "Two complete strangers cutting themselves off from the world inside of [sic] a dilapidated mansion? That's already a movie I want to see. But once A Dark Song starts delving into issues like love, loss, faith, and the natural human reaction to sudden tragedy, that's when it blossoms from a novel concept to a truly powerful piece of genre filmmaking."
