= The Ice Cream Girls =

- Genre: Crime drama
- Created by: Dorothy Koomson
- Written by: Kate Brooke
- Directed by: Dan Zeff
- Starring: Lorraine Burroughs; Jodhi May; Martin Compston; Nicholas Pinnock; Georgina Campbell; Holli Dempsey; Dominique Jackson; Bryan Dick
- Composer: Samuel Sim
- Country of origin: United Kingdom
- Original language: English
- No. of series: 1
- No. of episodes: 3

Production
- Executive producer: Andy Harries
- Producers: Lucy Dyke; James Flynn; Ronan Flynn
- Production locations: Bray, County Wicklow, Ireland
- Cinematography: Martin Fuhrer
- Editor: Úna Ní Dhonghaíle
- Running time: 60 minutes
- Production company: Left Bank Pictures

Original release
- Network: ITV
- Release: 19 April – 3 May 2013

The Ice Cream Girls is a three-part British television crime drama, first broadcast in 2013, based on the bestselling novel by Dorothy Koomson. The story follows two vulnerable teenage girls, Serena Gorringe (Lorraine Burroughs) and Poppy Carlisle (Jodhi May), who in the summer of 1995, are accused of murdering their schoolteacher, Marcus Hansley (Martin Compston) after becoming involved in a tryst of violence and sexual abuse. Although Serena is acquitted, Poppy is convicted of murder. In the following years, the two girls lead very different lives - Poppy's family rebuff her, leaving her to serve her prison sentence alone. Serena, however, finds love with university sweetheart Evan (Nicholas Pinnock) and has a daughter, Verity (Dominique Jackson).

But seventeen years later, Poppy and Serena are unexpectedly reunited, and they are forced to confront each other and reveal the truth behind their dark, shared history. The series, broadcast on ITV, was shot in Bray, County Wicklow, which is used to represent the town of Brighton. The series achieved good viewing figures, with the first episode gathering 5.53 million, 4.83 million tuning in for the second episode and 5.18 million for the final episode. Notably, the series has never been released on DVD.

== Critical reception ==
Sam Wollaston of The Guardian said of the first episode, "it shares this with The Poison Tree, too, there's an obviousness to it. An ITV drama-ness about it. It's so consciously trying to be a psychological thriller, not just your bog-standard thriller," and "I'll watch the rest, because it's enthralling enough for me to want to know what happens, or rather what happened. But I won't be lying awake at night thinking about it."

== Cast ==
- Lorraine Burroughs — Serena Farley (née Gorringe)
- Jodhi May — Poppy Carlisle
- Martin Compston — Marcus Hansley
- Nicholas Pinnock — Evan Farley
- Georgina Campbell — Young Serena Gorringe
- Holli Dempsey — Young Poppy Carlisle
- Dominique Jackson — Verity "Vee" Farley
- Bryan Dick — Al Francis
- Kathy Kiera Clarke — Marlene Riley
- Doña Croll — Rachel Gorringe
- Sara Powell — Fez Gorringe
- Eleanor Methven — Liz Carlisle
- Owen Roe — Jim
- Michael McElhatton — Brian
- Laura Jane Laughlin — Serena's Lawyer
- Dylan Tighe — Poppy's Lawyer

== Episodes ==
No.	Title	Directed by	Written by	Original release date	UK viewers (millions)
1	"Episode 1"	Dan Zeff	Kate Brooke	19 April 2013	5.53
After learning of her mother's failing health, Serena Farley (Lorraine Burroughs) decides to move back home to Brighton with husband Evan (Nicholas Pinnock) and daughter Verity (Dominique Jackson). Serena's childhood home, however, holds bad memories of the summer of 1995, in which she and another schoolgirl, Poppy Carlisle (Jodhi May) were accused of the murder of their schoolteacher, Marcus Hansley (Martin Compston). Meanwhile, Poppy, who was convicted and has served seventeen years for the murder, is released and struggles to adapt to life on the outside. Her mother's pleasure at finally having her daughter home is scuppered by her step-father, Jim, who has been convinced of her guilt from the very start. Unable to let her demons lie, Poppy sets about tracking Serena down in an attempt to finally reveal the truth about what happened that summer.
2	"Episode 2"	Dan Zeff	Kate Brooke	26 April 2013	4.83
As Poppy discovers that she has an unexpected ally in Al (Bryan Dick), Serena visits the probation service, angered that she wasn't warned about Poppy's release. Following Poppy's advice, Evan plans to surprise Serena with a trip to Wavenden Point, unaware that it holds the key to the terrible events of 1995. Poppy approaches Verity and attempts to find about more about her. Al offers to help Poppy uncover the truth about what happened that day, and attempts to track down Marcus' girlfriend at the time, Marlene Riley. However, unbeknown to Poppy, Al is secretly a journalist working on a story about her release, and now aware of who the second Ice Cream girl was, makes an unexpected visit to Serena.
3	"Episode 3"	Dan Zeff	Kate Brooke	3 May 2013	5.18
Serena's sister Fez calls the probation service, and Poppy is subsequently arrested. Facing recall to prison for breaking the conditions of her parole, Poppy is distraught and vows to uncover the truth. Al manages to track down Marlene Riley, but she denies all knowledge of the murder. During a heart-to-heart with Poppy, Serena realises that neither of them could have been Marcus' killer, and that a third party was involved. As Poppy recalls the tragic events of that night, Serena realises that her own mother could be the killer. As Evan comes to terms with his wife's true identity, Serena is forced to confront Rachel and finally get to the truth - before Poppy is sent back to prison for a crime she didn't commit.
