= Lorraine Burroughs =

British actress

- Born: 22 January 1981 (age 45); Birmingham, England
- Occupation: Actress
- Years active: 2003-present

Lorraine Burroughs (born 22 January 1981) is a British actress of stage and screen. She was born in Birmingham and attended Bishop Challoner RC School there. She later trained at RADA.

Burroughs is best known for her role in the play The Mountaintop for which she received an Olivier Award nomination for Best Actress in 2010.

Her TV appearances include DCI Banks, Lip Service, Top Boy, Spooks: Code 9, All About George, and Butterfly. Burroughs also starred in the New Tricks episode Good Morning Lemmings in 2010. She played Trix Warren in the 2012 film Fast Girls. She had lead roles as Serena Farley (Gorringe) in the 2013 three part drama The Ice Cream Girls and as DI Gina Conroy in Silent Witness episode Protection in 2015. In 2016, she appeared as Olga in the Christmas two-part special of Last Tango in Halifax on BBC1. In 2022, she recurred as supervillainess Virginia Devereaux / Clayface throughout the third season of Pennyworth.

Her radio drama credits include The Colour Purple and Burned To Nothing.

She currently lives in London.

== Filmography ==
=== Film ===
Year	Title	Role	Notes
2004	Red Rose	Monique	
2006	Wide Sargasso Sea	Amelie	Television film
2007	This Is What It Is	Kelly	
2010	Excluded	Belinda	Television film
2011	The Glass Man	Janie	
2012	Fast Girls	Trix Warren	
2017	Trendy	Olivia Latham	
2020	Muscle	Crystal	
2020	Spell	Veora Woods	

=== Television ===
Year	Title	Role	Notes
2003	Doctors	Macy Holyoake	Episode: "A Red Light Means Stop"
2004	Casualty	Wendy Collins	Episode: "Fallen Hero"
2004	Down to Earth	Kelly	Episode: "Unfinished Business"
2004	Hex	Sinead	Episode: "Pilot: The Story Begins"
2005	All About George	Jess	Series regular; 6 episodes
2007	Casualty	Tracey Cowley	Episode: "The Miracle on Harry's Last Shift"
2008	Doctor Who	Thalina	Episode: "The Fires of Pompeii"
2008	Spooks: Code 9	Sarah Yates	Series regular; 6 episodes
2010	Identity	Sophie Curtis	Episode: "Second Life"
2010	New Tricks	Gail Shaw	Episode: "Good Morning Lemmings"
2010–2012	Lip Service	Fin	Recurring role; 4 episodes
2010–2012	DCI Banks	DS Winsome Jackman	Recurring role; 14 episodes
2011	The Shadow Line	WPC Drewe	Miniseries; 1 episodes
2011	Law & Order: UK	Marci Wade	Episode: "Deal"
2013	The Ice Cream Girls	Serena Farley	Miniseries; 3 episodes
2013	Top Boy	Rhianna Parkes	Recurring role; 4 episodes
2015	Silent Witness	DI Gina Conroy	Episode: "Protection"
2016	The Five	Jennifer Kenwood	Miniseries; 5 episodes
2016	Last Tango in Halifax	Olga	Recurring role; 2 episodes
2017	Fortitude	Spindoe	Recurring role; 2 episodes
2018	Hard Sun	Simone Hicks	Miniseries; 5 episodes
2018	Moving On	Michelle	Episode: "Neighbour"
2018	Midsomer Murders	Freya Ferabbee	Episode: "Send in the Clowns"
2018	Butterfly	Paula	Miniseries; 3 episodes
2019	Carnival Row	Magrite	Episode: "Some Dark God Wakes"
2020	Death in Paradise	Shonelle Delport	Episode: "Pirates of the Murder Scene"
2020	Strike Back	Carolyn Fortier	Episode: "Vendetta"
2020	Maxxx	Tanisha	Episode: "Death"
2021	Close to Me	Helen	Miniseries; 4 episodes
2021	Red Election	Etta Cornwell	Series regular; 8 episodes
2021	On the Edge	Frankie	Episode: "Superdad"
2022	Pennyworth	Virginia Devereaux	Recurring role; 4 episodes
2024	Sweetpea	Claudia	Recurring role; 6 episodes
2026	Power: The Downfall of Huw Edwards	Angelica Masters	Docudrama film

== Awards and nominations ==
Year	Award	Category	Nominated work	Result	Ref.
2010	Laurence Olivier Awards	Best Actress	The Mountaintop	Nominated	
