= My Best Friend's Girl (novel) =

2006 novel by Dorothy Koomson

- First edition (publ. Sphere Books)
- Author: Dorothy Koomson
- Language: English
- Publication date: 2006

My Best Friend's Girl is a 2006 novel by Dorothy Koomson. The book's sales were boosted when it was chosen for the Richard and Judy's Summer Reads shortlist. The novel is about a woman called Kamryn Matika, who finds out that her best friend, Adele, is dying of cancer. Adele wants Kamryn to adopt her five-year-old daughter, Tegan after she dies. The book deals with themes of death and grief, innocence and forgiveness. The title is drawn from the 1976 song "My Best Friend's Girl" by The Cars.

== Plot ==
Kamryn Matika is a 32-year-old national marketing manager for a department store, who lives in Leeds. On her birthday, she receives a card—not a birthday card—from her former best friend, Adele Brannon, which says that she is in hospital and she is dying. Kamryn is reluctant to see her. Two years previously, she discovered that her partner and her best friend conceived a child together three years earlier. Kamryn had vowed never to speak to them again. However, she visits London anyway but when at the hospital she discovers that Adele has terminal cancer and is going to die soon. She is shocked when Adele says that she wants Kamryn to adopt her daughter Tegan. Kamryn thinks about it and reflects when she met Adele in university for a couple of hours before she goes to collect Tegan from Adele's father and step-mother, who have abused and neglected both Adele and Tegan. They let Tegan go as (a) they would be glad to see the back of her (b) Kamryn had threatened to phone the police. Tegan is somewhat quiet and is rather scared, but Kamryn reassures her everything will be ok. In the hotel room, Kamryn is shocked to see how much abuse Tegan had suffered at the hands of her grandparents. Kamryn decides to stick to a plan: bath, food, bed. This actually works in a bizarre way. A few days later, Kamryn receives a knock on her door to say that Adele had died during the night. This shocks Kamryn and she tries to tell Tegan but she refuses to believe it.

A few weeks later, Kamryn and Tegan move back up to Leeds. At first, there were issues such as they don't know what shampoo to get for Tegan. Kamryn is under suspicion as she is a black woman with a white child.

Kamryn once forgets Tegan and leaves her at a play group while she is having dinner with her new boss, Luke. The next day, Luke comes round and Tegan asks him to come to the zoo with her and Kamryn. Kamryn and Luke become closer and then they become lovers.

Just as they are settling in, Kamryn's former partner (and Tegan's father), Nate, comes back on the scene. Kamryn tells Nate about his daughter, to which he is now becoming used to even helping with her sixth birthday party, which goes badly wrong when Tegan has an allergic reaction. In the hospital, Kamryn and Nate share a kiss which is seen by Luke, resulting in a massive break-up between him and Kamryn.

About eighteen months later, Luke meets up with Kamryn and Tegan in a café and seems to have forgiven Kamryn. Tegan is now Kamryn's adopted daughter and says that they are going to get a cat.

== Characters ==
Kamryn Matika - aged 32, she lives in Leeds. She finds herself in a difficult situation with adopting Tegan. Kamryn is very self-conscious due to being bullied because she was larger as child, teenager and a young adult, and this causes her to be rather hostile towards men. At the end of the novel she is legally Tegan's mother.

Adele Brannon (formally Lucinda-Jayne Adele Hamilton-Mackenzie) - Kamryn's best friend of fourteen years and Tegan's real mother. Adele formally dressed like a nerd and spoke in a posh accent as her family is upper-class. Her mother died due to complications after Adele's birth and suffered abuse from her father and his new wife for years. She had Tegan after she slept with Kamryn's fiancé, Nate. As a result, Kamryn did not speak to her for two years. Adele had terminal cancer so she died early in the novel.

Luke Wiseman - Kamryn's boss and later boyfriend. Luke was a product of a teenage pregnancy and was taken into care at a young age. He sees Tegan as his own daughter and is rather protective of her, especially when Nate (who is Tegan's biological father) arrives.

Nate Turner - Tegan's father from a one-night stand with Adele and Kamryn's former fiancé. He has a bit of a minor breakdown after discovering his relation to Tegan and he tries to get involved with her but he is really just trying to get Kamryn back with him.

Tegan Brannon - Adele's five- (later seven-) year-old daughter from her affair with Nate. Despite the reminder of her biological mother's death, she still loves Kamryn all the same.
