= Noel Fielding =

British comedian (born 1973)

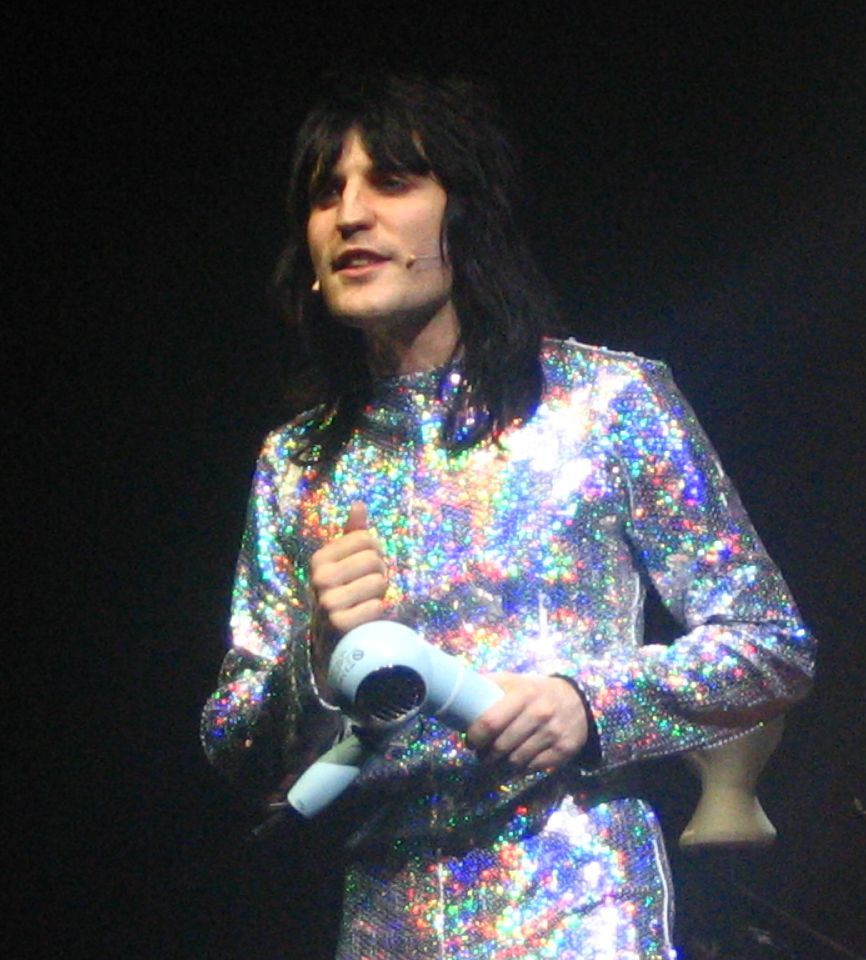
- Fielding in 2006
- Born: 21 May 1973 (age 53); Westminster, London, England
- Education: Croydon College of Art; Buckinghamshire New University (BA)
- Occupations: Comedian; actor; writer; television personality; artist; musician
- Years active: 1996–present
- Partner: Lliana Bird (c. 2010–present)
- Children: 2
- Relatives: Michael Fielding (half-brother)

Comedy career
- Medium: Television; radio; stand-up
- Genres: Dark comedy; surreal humour
- Website: noelfielding.co.uk

Noel Fielding (/ˈnəʊəl/; born 21 May 1973) is an English comedian, actor, writer, television personality and artist. Known for his dark and surreal comedic style, he gained prominence in the late 1990s as a member of the comedy troupe The Mighty Boosh.

Fielding began performing stand-up comedy when he graduated from art school in 1995. In 1997 he first met Mighty Boosh collaborator Julian Barratt when they both appeared on the same comedy bill at a pub in North London. In 1998, they performed their first comedy show together, then later they took the show, The Mighty Boosh, to the Edinburgh Fringe Festival. They returned to the festival in 1999 with Arctic Boosh and in 2000 with Autoboosh. In 2001, The Mighty Boosh became a six-part radio show on BBC London Live called The Boosh, later transferring to BBC Radio 4. In 2004, the Mighty Boosh became a television show, The Mighty Boosh, which ran for three series on BBC Three until 2007. The television show generated a cult following and earned them a variety of awards.

Fielding played the role of Richmond in the Channel 4 sitcom The IT Crowd (2006–2013) and wrote and starred in his own Channel 4 comedy show Noel Fielding's Luxury Comedy (2012–2014). He appeared as a team captain on the BBC Two panel show Never Mind the Buzzcocks (2009–2015; 2021–2025). Since 2017, has co-presented the Channel 4 baking competition show The Great British Bake Off. In 2024, he played Dick Turpin in the Apple TV+ comedy series The Completely Made-Up Adventures of Dick Turpin. Aside from his comedy and television career, Fielding has worked as a visual artist, exhibiting his artwork internationally. He has also occasionally worked as a musician, most notably as member of the band Loose Tapestries.

== Early life and education ==
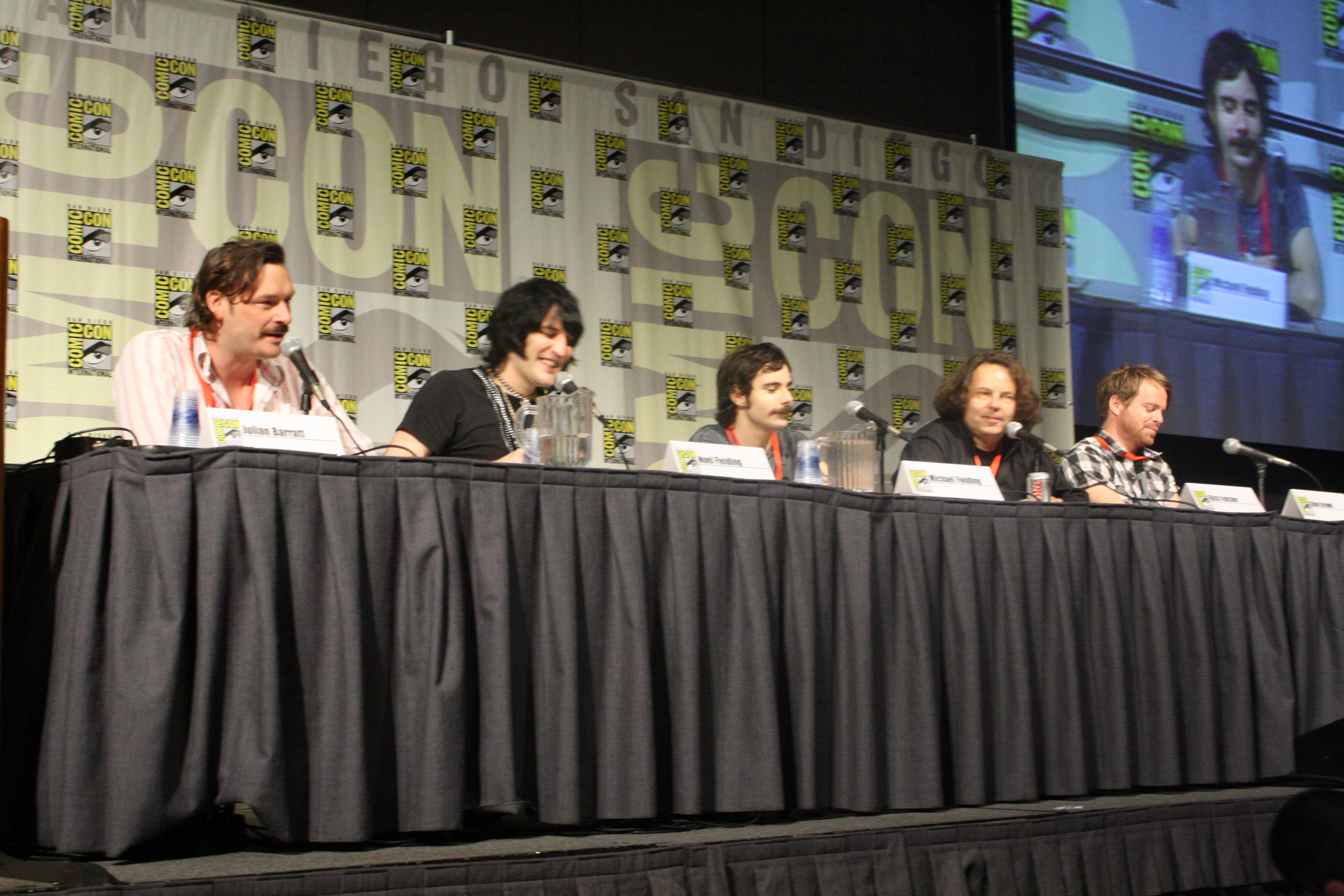
The cast of the Mighty Boosh at Comic-con; from left to right Julian Barratt, Noel Fielding, Michael Fielding, Rich Fulcher, Dave Brown (2009)

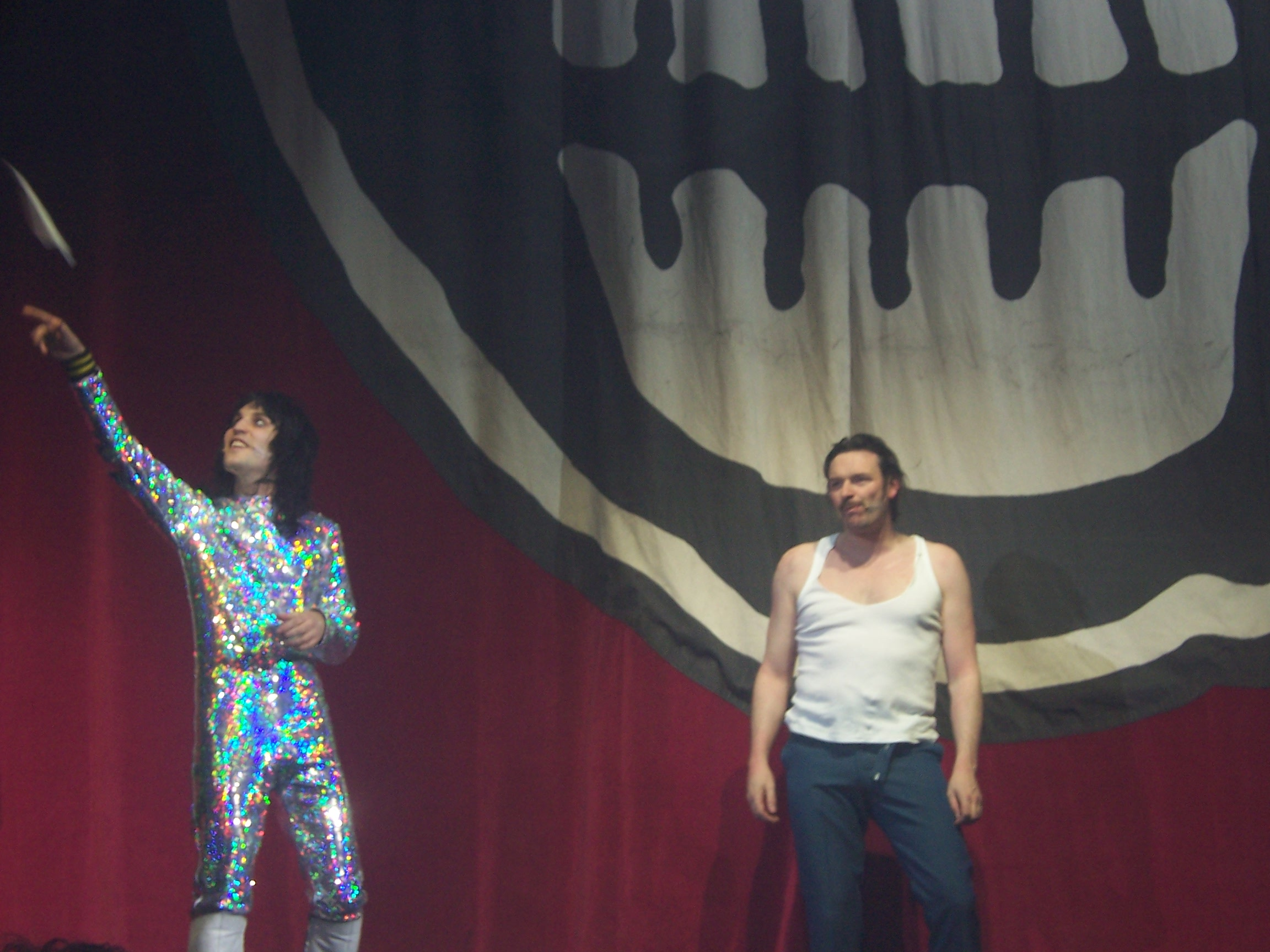
Fielding and Barratt as Vince Noir and Howard Moon in the stageshow The Mighty Boosh Live at the Brighton Dome (February 2006)

Fielding was born in the Westminster area of London in 1973, the son of Royal Mail manager Ray Fielding and Yvonne Fagan. He grew up in Mitcham, Southwest London.

He is of French descent through his father, whom Fielding has described as being "basically French". When Fielding was three years old, his father remarried and Fielding was mostly raised by his paternal grandmother.

His father and stepmother, Diane, would later become more involved in parenting during Fielding's mother's illness in the 1980s. His mother had two more children before dying in 1990, aged 37 years old, from complications caused by liver damage. Fielding has commented that, "My parents had lots of parties... They were hopelessly bohemian."

Michael Fielding, his younger paternal half-brother, later played various characters in The Mighty Boosh TV show and live stage shows as well as Noel Fielding's Luxury Comedy. His father, Ray Fielding, and his stepmother appeared in The Mighty Boosh TV show, with his father having several cameos as Chris de Burgh.

When Fielding was around 6 or 7, he was at a Kiss concert, wearing a Kiss costume and he was taken to the backstage dressing room of Kiss so that Gene Simmons could be shown his costume. At the age of 13, Fielding began writing comedy sketches. At the age of 15, Fielding became a goth and had goth girlfriends. At this time he first tried using makeup and said he loved being dressed up by his girlfriends.

Whilst studying at Croydon Art College, Fielding met Mighty Boosh collaborator Dave Brown. From 1992 to 1995, Fielding studied for a BA in graphic design and advertising at Buckinghamshire College of Higher Education in High Wycombe, graduating in 1995.

Whilst at Buckinghamshire College, both Dave Brown and Nigel Coan were studying the same course as Fielding and in their second and third year of university all three lived in a student flat together. Nigel Coan also collaborated with Fielding on the Mighty Boosh. After they had lived together in student housing, Fielding, Brown, and Coan also later lived together in a flat in Hackney, London.

== Career ==
=== Stand-up comedy ===
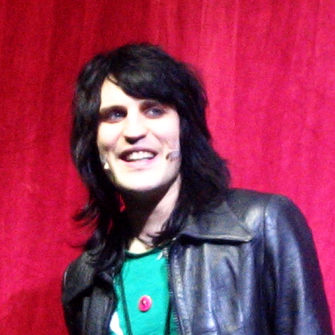
Fielding in 2006

Fielding began performing comedy while at university and he began performing stand up when he graduated in 1995.

He first met Mighty Boosh collaborator Julian Barratt when he attended one of Barratt's solo stand-up gig's at the Hellfire comedy club and Fielding approached Barratt after his gig had finished. Later, on The Jonathan Ross Show, Barratt said that they had liked each other's comedy but did not know if a collaboration would work, but, according to Fielding, they "had quite a good chemistry straight away". On the day they met, they both went back to Julian's place that night where Barratt played music on his Akai sampler while Fielding used a ping-pong ball to make an eye patch. They shared an interest in music, with Fielding more into rock and roll and pop, and Barratt preferring jazz, but both enjoyed electro and both had played in bands before meeting. They also shared common interests in comedy, including Vic Reeves and Bob Mortimer.

After Fielding performed at the final of The Daily Telegraph open mic award at the Edinburgh comedy festival, he was signed to Avalon talent agency and through Avalon began performing on the same comedy bills as Barratt. During this period, Fielding and Barratt were performing stand-up at the same gigs together and they realised they liked each other's stuff and began writing and doing gigs together as a duo.

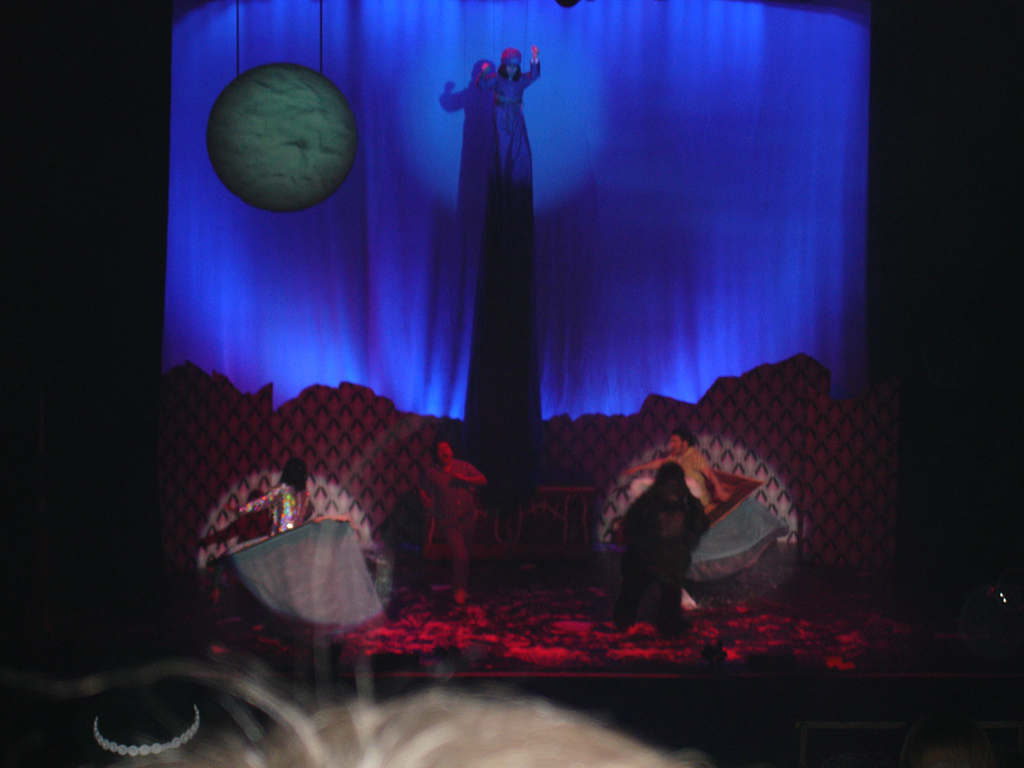
The magic carpet finale of the Mighty Boosh Live stageshow. From left to right: Noel Fielding as Vince Noir, Rich Fulcher as Bob Fossil, Michael Fielding as Naboo, Dave Brown as Bollo and Julian Barratt as Howard Moon. March 2006

In 2002, Fielding performed his solo show Voodoo Hedgehog at the Edinburgh festival; it included the characters "The Moon" and "The Jelly Fox" which later appeared in the Mighty Boosh TV series, and received a Perrier award nomination. In 2010, Fielding was going to perform a solo tour across the country, but then cancelled by announcing via Twitter that he was too busy as he wanted to concentrate on writing The Mighty Boosh film with Julian Barratt as well as creating a new album. In 2012, he toured Sydney and Melbourne performing a solo stand-up show as well as hosting a stand-up comedy gala as part of the Just For Laughs festival held in Sydney.

From 2014 to 2015, Fielding toured the UK and Australia with a new comedy show, An Evening With Noel Fielding, that included both stand-up comedy and sketch comedy. In addition to Fielding, the show included performances from his brother Michael Fielding and long-term collaborator Tom Meeten. Mighty Boosh collaborator Nigel Coan created the animation for the show.

In 2005 and 2010 Fielding performed a solo stand-up show at Montreal's Just For Laughs comedy festival. In 2020 the festival had to be moved online during the COVID-19 pandemic; during this period Fielding and Jimmy Carr live-streamed a conversation from their respective homes.

=== The Mighty Boosh ===
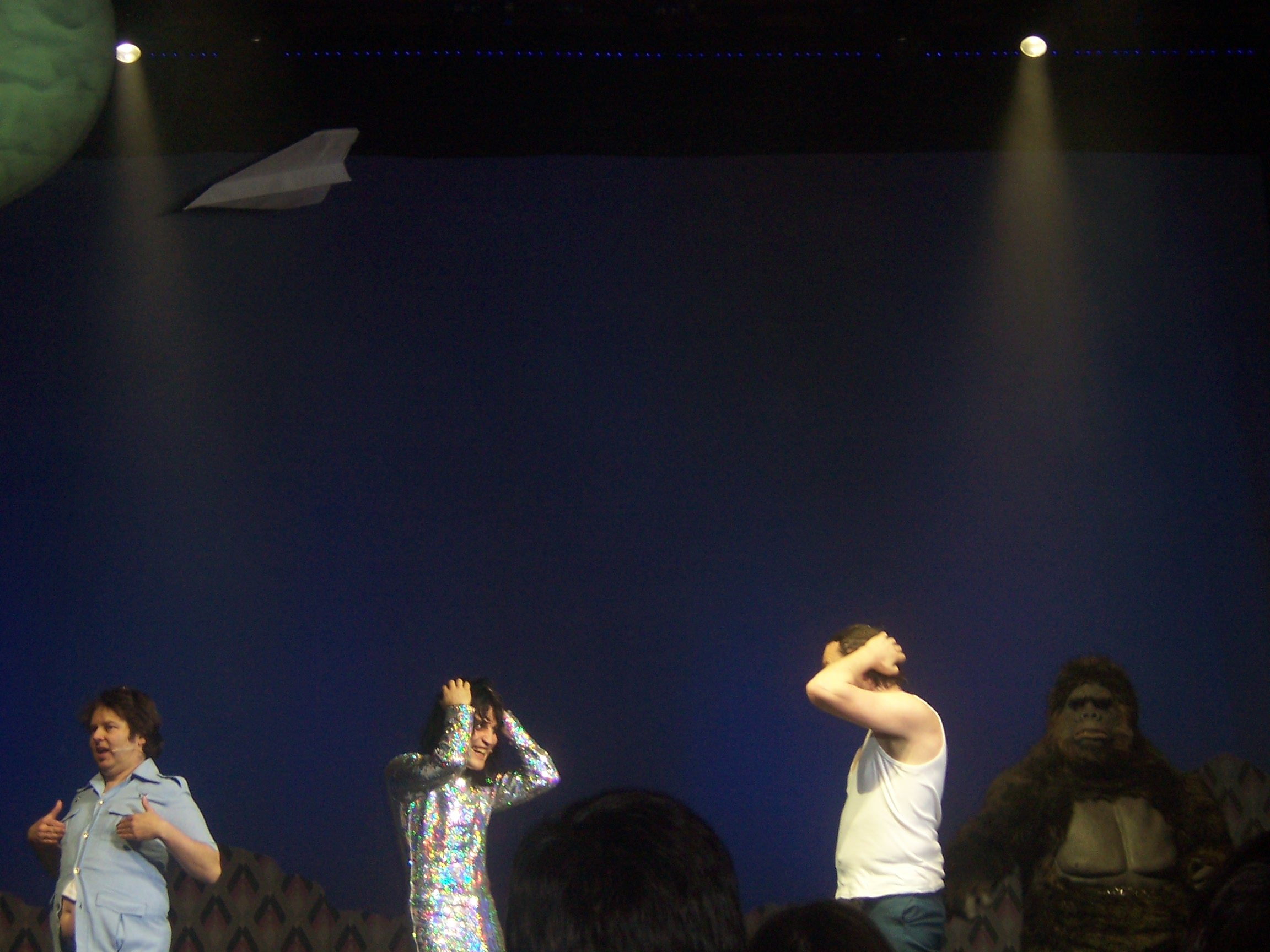
A performance of the stageshow The Mighty Boosh Live at the Brighton Dome. February 2006

Barratt and Fielding performed together for the first time in Stewart Lee's show, Moby Dick and King Dong (at the Edinburgh Fringe Festival, 1997), in which Barratt played King Dong's penis.

Sometime around 1998, they then put on their first comedy show at Oranje Boom Boom, which "was very raw, but... hilarious", and afterwards got a gig at Hen and Chickens Theatre, a theatre bar in Islington, London. They then took The Mighty Boosh up to Edinburgh in 1998, followed by Arctic Boosh (1999) and Autoboosh (2000). Fielding said about their first live show in 1998 that they had worked on their ideas together, and played "zookeepers [who] got sucked through our bosses' eyes and into a magic forest". Both Michael Fielding and Richard Ayoade appeared in a performance of the Mighty Boosh at the Hen and Chickens in 2002 during a live run through of a Mighty Boosh pilot. Fielding and Barratt said that they used to put potted plants all around the Hen and Chickens "to try and make it into a sort of play", but they "didn't know anything about theatre or what you did". The name "Mighty Boosh" was originally a phrase used by a friend of Michael Fielding's to describe the hair that Michael had as a child.

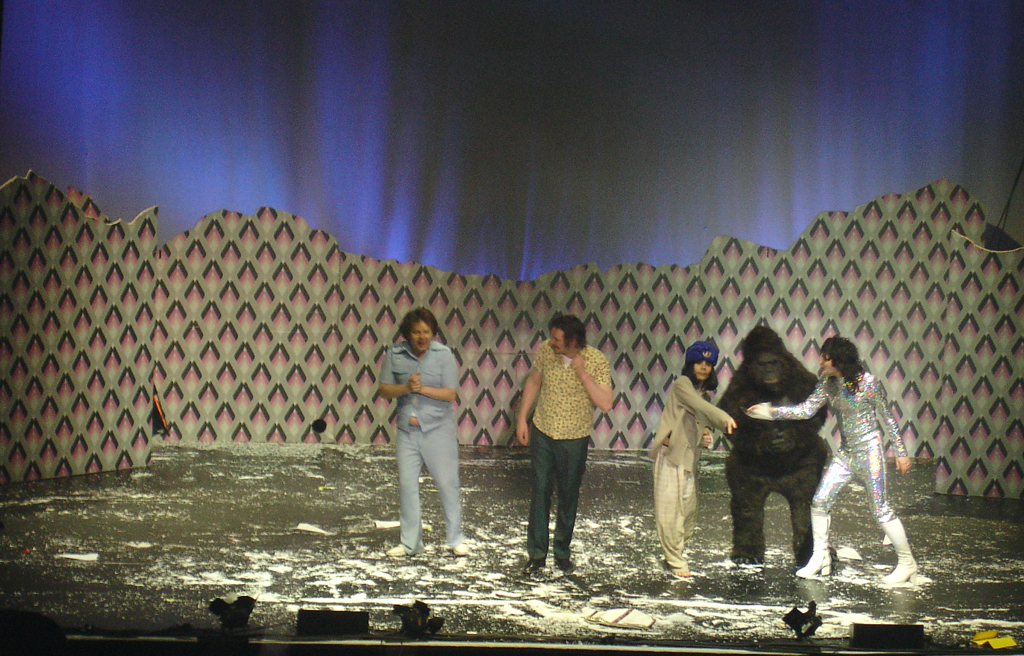
The Mighty Boosh Live stage show; from left to right: Rich Fulcher, Julian Barratt, Michael Fielding, Dave Brown, and Noel Fielding (March 2006)

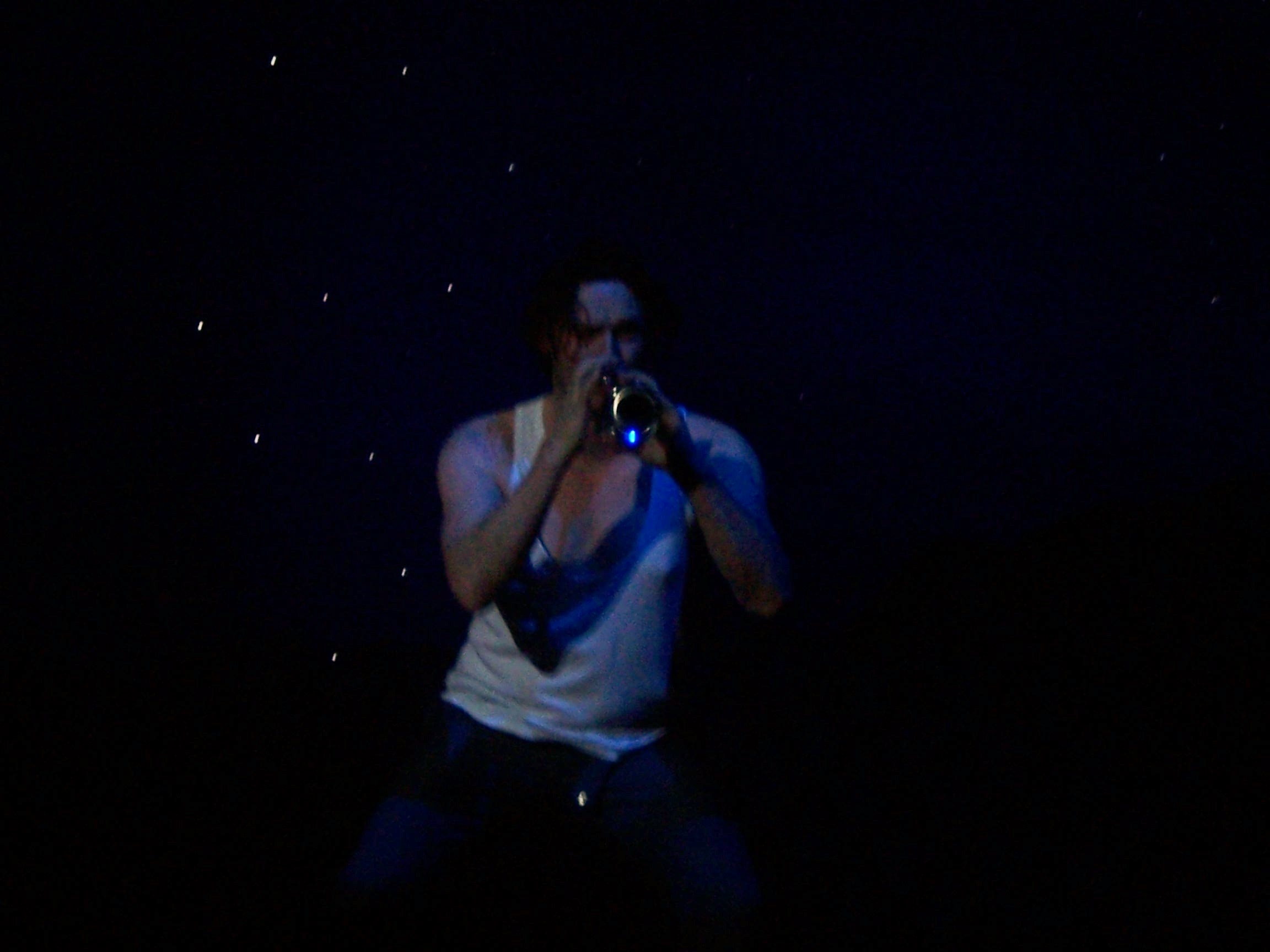
Julian Barratt as Howard Moon at the Mighty Boosh Live, Brighton Dome, Feb 2006

In 2001, The Mighty Boosh became a six-part radio show on BBC London Live, later transferring to BBC Radio 4.

In 2004, it became an 8-part TV show which aired on BBC Three, with a second series airing in 2005, and a third airing in 2007—20 episodes in all. In each series the setting changes, with the first series set in a zoo operated by Bob Fossil, the second in a flat, and the third in a secondhand shop in Dalston called Nabootique. The Mighty Boosh almost did not make it to television, until Steve Coogan's production company sold the concept to the BBC simply by saying: "If we were young, we'd want to be them". The style of humour in the Mighty Boosh is often described as being surreal, as well as being escapist and new wave comedy. Fielding has said "I think our show is magical and fantastical. We tell very intricate, weird stories. Vince Noir is quite modern, a bit of an indie kid; Howard Moon is... eccentric... and we rely heavily on Julian's music and my animation".

Fielding said that for the first three weeks of the TV show, he did all of the paintings for the animations, but this led to lack of sleep, so Ivana Zorn, Nigel Coan's partner, started doing most of the painting, with Fielding just designing the main characters. Fielding formed "Secret Peter Productions" with Nigel Coan and together with Ivana Zorn they animated series 1 and 2 of the Mighty Boosh TV show, An evening with Noel Fielding and Noel Fielding's Luxury Comedy. Coan also directed Noel Fielding's Luxury Comedy as well as helping to write it along with Fielding. Dave Brown also contributed graphics for the Mighty Boosh and Julian Barratt composed all the music. Other regular Boosh collaborators included Michael Fielding, Rich Fulcher, Dave Brown, Richard Ayoade, and Matt Berry

In 2006, Fielding and Barratt went on tour with a new theatre show The Mighty Boosh Live. Fielding later said "We always thought we'd make one show and that'd be the end of it. But after we won the Perrier, everyone was telling us that we had to do another, which we did and brought it to Melbourne and won the Barry, and then we made a radio show that won the Douglas Adams Award... It went on and on". The Mighty Boosh also won the Shockwaves NME Best TV Award three times in 2007, 2008, and 2010. From August 2008 to January 2009 they went on tour for a second time with a new stage show of the Mighty Boosh.

Fielding has said several times that he talked about writing a film with Barratt, and he would have loved to do so, but they never got around to it. They wrote two film scripts which did not make it to production. One was a "Rocky Horror Picture Show type thing", according to Fielding, in which Barratt played a character who has woken up believing himself to be the last man on earth. The other was an Arctic adventure – "because we always liked the Arctic".

=== Other television appearances ===
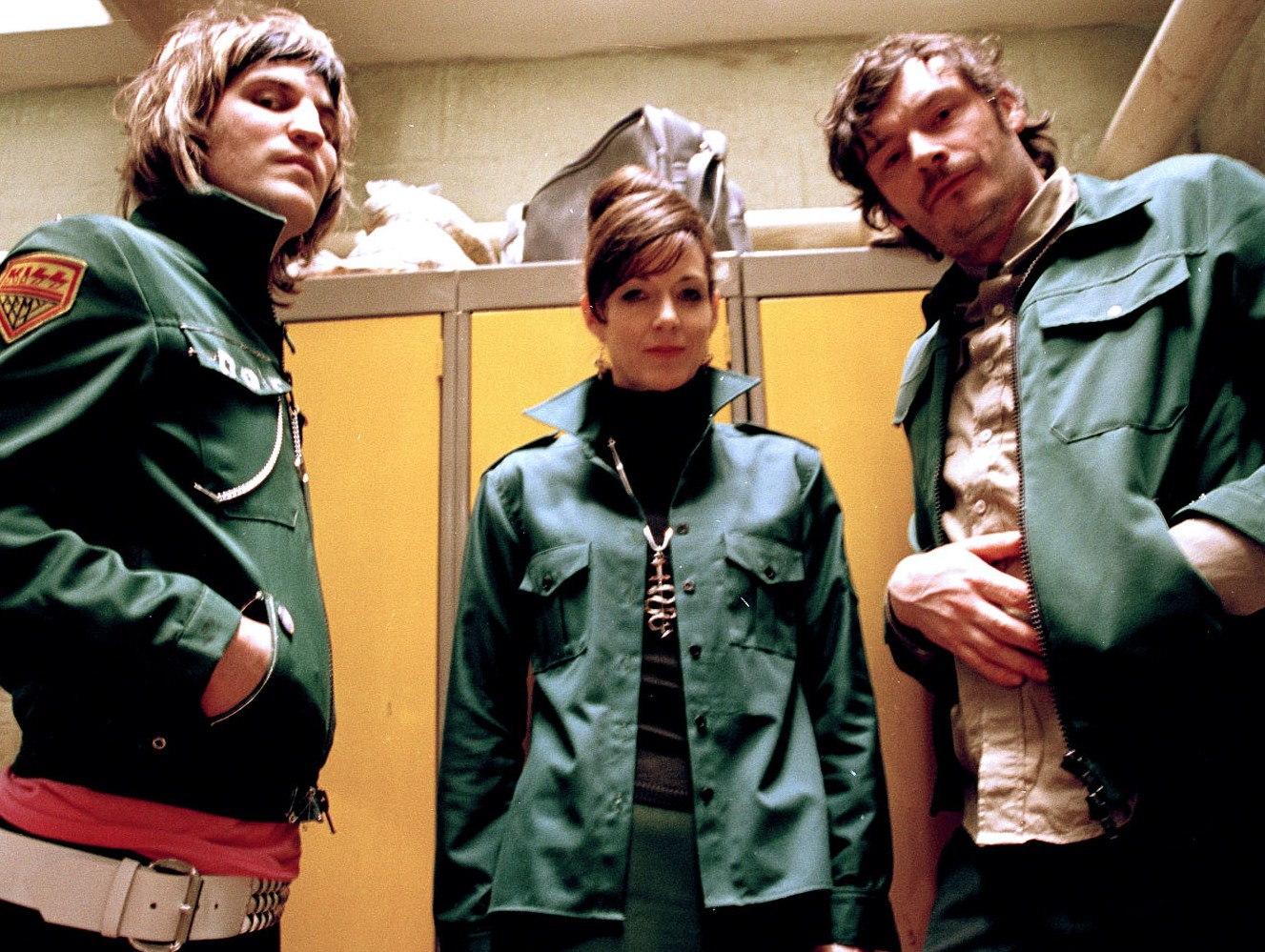
From left to right; Noel Fielding, Victoria Wicks, and Julian Barratt on the set of series one of The Mighty Boosh TV series (2004)

At Bill Bailey's request, Fielding stood in as a team captain for three episodes of Never Mind the Buzzcocks during series 21 in 2007 and when Bailey returned as team captain, presenter Simon Amstell made various jokes about Fielding's departure. Fielding also achieved a record for the highest team score ever on the show and in 2009, Bailey left the show and Fielding became one of the regular team captains.

In The IT Crowd, Fielding plays Richmond, a former executive who used to report to Denholm, the director of the company that he and the other main characters Maurice, Roy and Jen work for, but after he discovered black metal band Cradle of Filth he changed his appearance at work to that of a goth and began living in the IT department server room.

Between 2006 and 2019 Fielding appeared thirteen times on the quiz show The Big Fat Quiz of the Year as well as its spin-off shows The Big Fat Anniversary Quiz, The Big Fat Quiz of the Decade and The Big Fat Quiz of Everything. He appeared on the quiz show three times with Russell Brand, nine times with Richard Ayoade and once with Eddie Izzard.

In 2011, he took part in Catherine Tate's TV movie Laughing at the Noughties in which he and other British comedians discussed the comedy highlights of the noughties.

Fielding produced his first solo series for Channel 4 network's E4 channel in 2011, as the broadcaster invested an additional £5 million in its comedy budget following the cancellation of reality show Big Brother. Fielding said of the project, tentatively titled Noel Fielding: Boopus: "I want to make something in the spirit of Spike Milligan or the Kenny Everett Show but using modern techniques. Blending filmed comedy with animation. Television needs a madman! I want the show to be psychedelic and beautiful but have charm and personality. If Dalí made a show hopefully it would look like this." The show began broadcasting in January 2012, titled Noel Fielding's Luxury Comedy. The show's second series, titled Noel Fielding's Luxury Comedy 2: Tales From Painted Hawaii, was first broadcast on E4 in 2014.

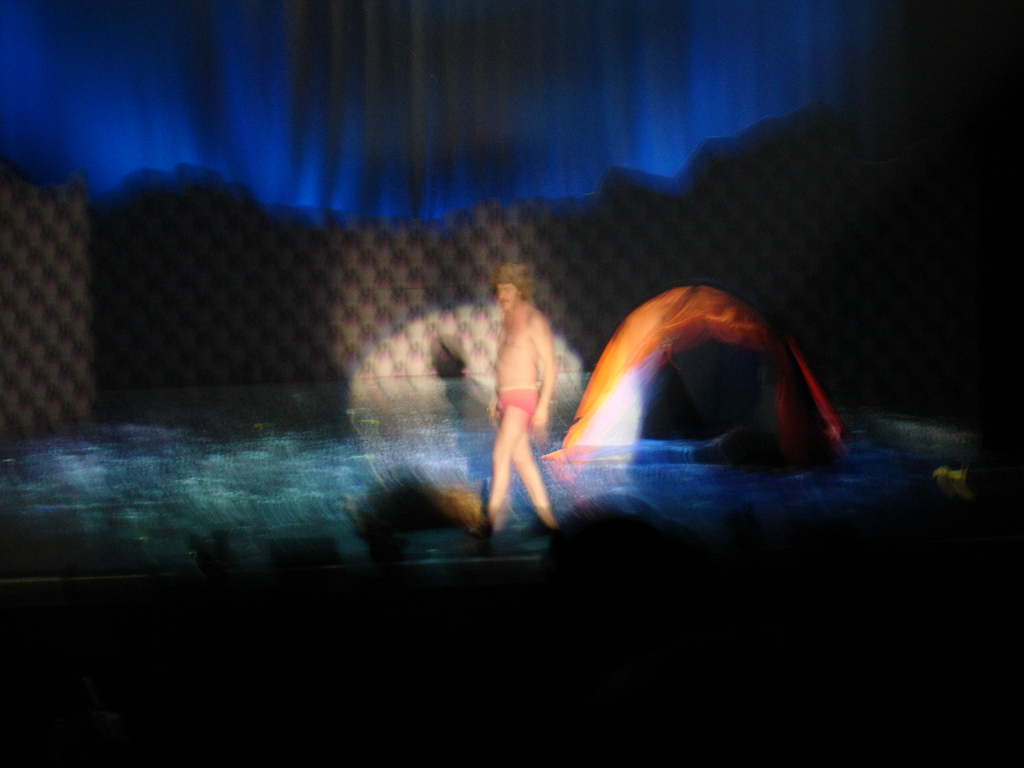
Julian Barratt playing Howard Moon in the stageshow The Mighty Boosh Live. March 2006

Also in 2011, Fielding performed Kate Bush's "Wuthering Heights" dance routine for Series 3 of Let's Dance for Comic Relief, and reached the grand final.

In 2010 and 2014, he took part in Channel 4's Comedy Gala, a benefit show held in aid of Great Ormond Street Children's Hospital.

In March 2017, it was revealed that Fielding would co-host the upcoming series of The Great British Bake Off alongside Sandi Toksvig.

Fielding appeared as a contestant on Series 4 of the Dave comedy panel game Taskmaster in 2017, hosted by Greg Davies and Alex Horne: he was the overall series winner.

From 2013 to 2018, he was on eight episodes of QI, including an appearance alongside Russell Brand and Aisling Bea in 2018.

In 2024, Fielding played Dick Turpin in an Apple TV+ comedy series, The Completely Made-Up Adventures of Dick Turpin.

=== Radio ===
In November 2007, Fielding starred in five episodes of BBC Radio 2 show Vic Reeves' House Arrest as a local vagrant who knocks on Reeves' door once a week to ask for work.

=== Music ===
In late 1999 Fielding's melding of comedy and music led to him collaborating with Midfield General on the song "Midfielding", in which Noel delivers a surrealist monologue about native British mammals traveling to Africa to "kick some butt".

Fielding has appeared in several music videos, including Mint Royale's "Blue Song", alongside Julian Barratt, Nick Frost and Michael Smiley. The video was directed by Edgar Wright and served as the inspiration for the opening sequence of his film Baby Driver (2017). He also made a brief appearance in the video for Razorlight's "In the Morning". He appeared in music videos for the Robots in Disguise songs "Girl" (alongside Chris Corner who was, at the time, boyfriend to Sue Denim), "The Tears", and "Turn It Up". In 2009, Noel was involved in the Kasabian video "Vlad the Impaler", in which he plays the titular character, and reprised the role at the 2014 Glastonbury Festival.

The music video was directed by Richard Ayoade. He was referenced in Kasabian's "La Fée Verte", a track on their Velociraptor! album (his friend Sergio Pizzorno said "The line, 'I met Dalí in the street.' Dalí is Noel Fielding. And he is the modern-day Dalí"). Fielding also makes a brief appearance as Vlad in the video for another Kasabian song, "Re-Wired", riding a five-seater bicycle with the band, and appears as a patient in a psychiatric hospital in "You're In Love With a Psycho", in which he re-enacts the broken mirror routine from the Marx Brothers film Duck Soup with Pizzorno and Tom Meighan. He has also appeared in Kate Bush's music video "Deeper Understanding" as a means of thanks for the Let's Dance For Comic Relief performance.

Fielding paired up with Sergio Pizzorno (Kasabian) to form a band, Loose Tapestries, formed to provide music for Noel Fielding's Luxury Comedy. Loose Tapestries released two albums and a Christmas single.

=== Art ===
Fielding has exhibited his paintings in London. He held his first exhibition of his paintings, entitled Psychedelic Dreams of the Jelly Fox, in a gallery above the patisserie Maison Bertaux, in Greek Street, Soho in December 2007. There Fielding listed some of his inspirations as Henri Rousseau, René Magritte, Willem de Kooning, Roy Lichtenstein, and Dexter Dalwood, a former tutor of his from the Croydon School of Art; Fielding has also cited Salvador Dalí as an inspiration. A second exhibition of his paintings entitled Bryan Ferry vs the Jelly Fox also took place at Maison Bertaux, from 5 July 2010 through to 5 January 2011.

In October 2011, Fielding released an art book called Scribblings of a Madcap Shambleton, which he produced along with The Mighty Boosh cast member Dave Brown. It features many of his old and new paintings, drawings and photography.

Fielding's video installation of The Jelly Fox was shown at the Saatchi Gallery, and in 2012 he created a unique piece inspired by The Beatles for Liverpool Love at the Museum of Liverpool. In March 2015, his exhibition He Wore Dreams Around Unkind Faces was shown at the Royal Albert Hall.

In January 2021, the luxury fashion house Fendi unveiled a collection featuring abstract takes on the brand's logo, created by Fielding.

On 18 November 2025, British rock band Pink Floyd released a newly mixed version of Shine On You Crazy Diamond (Parts I–IX) along with an official YouTube video featuring a time-lapse painting by Fielding inspired by founding Pink Floyd member Syd Barrett.

== Honours ==
On 6 September 2011, Fielding received an honorary master's degree from his alma mater, now called Buckinghamshire New University, for his ongoing interest in the graphics area and support for many art organisations.

== Personal life ==
Fielding was formerly in a relationship with Robots in Disguise lead vocalist Dee Plume, who made minor appearances in The Mighty Boosh and in its live adaptations. He began a relationship with radio DJ Lliana Bird sometime around 2010, and they have two children.

Fielding described himself as gender fluid in a 2024 interview, stating: "I'm always interested in clothes and makeup and I've always been quite gender-fluid".

During his time at art college, Fielding developed what was suspected to be the virus hepatitis A although it was later confirmed to be glandular fever. Nigel Coan, who studied the same course as Fielding at art college and also shared a flat with him during this time, helped Fielding during this period.

His paternal half-brother is Michael Fielding.

== Filmography ==
=== Film ===
Year	Title	Role	Notes
1999	Plunkett & Macleane	Brothel Gent	
2001	Sweet	Pete Sweet	Short
2009	Bunny and the Bull	Javier	
2010	Come on Eileen	Rex	
2011	Horrid Henry: The Movie	Ed Banger	
2015	Aaaaaaaah!	Carl	
2015	Set the Thames on Fire	Dickie	
2016	Brakes	Daniel	
2016	The Wonderful World of Death	Jones	
2018	The Festival	Hammerhead	
2019	The Lego Movie 2: The Second Part	Balthazar	Voice

=== Television ===
Year	Title	Role	Notes
1997–1998	Gas	Himself	Performed stand-up comedy in four episodes: Series 1 (8), Series 2 (2, 4, 6)
1998	Unnatural Acts	Various	
1998	Alexei Sayle's Merry-Go-Round	Various	Episode #1.2
1999	Comedy Cafe	Himself	Episode #1.7
2000	The Big Schmooze	Himself – Arctic Boosh	Episode #1.4
2000	Melbourne International Comedy Festival Gala	Himself	Stand-up comedy performed alongside Julian Barratt - Broadcast on ABC
2001	Melbourne International Comedy Festival Gala	Himself	Stand-up comedy performed alongside Julian Barratt - Broadcast on ABC
2002	Surrealissimo: The Scandalous Success of Salvador Dali	Bauer	TV movie - Appears alongside Julian Barratt
2002	Brain Candy	Himself	TV show with various comedians performing monologues
2003	Melbourne International Comedy Festival Gala	Himself	Stand-up comedy show titled "Voodoo Hedgehog"- Broadcast on ABC and Network Ten
2004	The British Comedy Awards 2004	Himself	TV special
2004	Garth Marenghi's Darkplace	Mutant "Ape-oid"	Series 1, Episode 4
2004	AD/BC: A Rock Opera	Shepherd	TV movie
2004–2007	The Mighty Boosh	Vince Noir / Various	3 Series, 30 Episodes
2005	28 Acts in 28 Minutes	Himself	TV special
2005	Nathan Barley	Jones	
2005	Just for Laughs	Himself	Just For Laughs Comedy Festival, Montreal - Stand-Up Comedy
2005	Breakfast	Himself	
2005	Alan Partridge Presents: The Cream of British Comedy	Himself	TV Special
2006	The Secret Policeman's Ball	Himself / Vince Noir	
2006	The British Comedy Awards 2006 Live	Himself	TV special
2006–2008	Friday Night with Jonathan Ross	Himself	Three Episodes
2006–2013	The IT Crowd	Richmond Avenal	Recurring character that appeared in 6 episodes in series 1, 2 and 4 as well as in the 2013 special.
2006–2019	The Big Fat Quiz of the Year	Himself	Annual TV Special – Seven episodes
2007	Dawn French's Boys Who Do Comedy	Himself	Episodes #1, #2, #3
2007	Comic Relief 2007: The Big One	Himself / Various	TV special
2007	Deadline	Himself	Episode #1.2
2007	The Charlotte Church Show	Himself	Episode #2.2
2007	Never Mind the Buzzcocks	Himself	Guest Team Captain, 3 episodes
2008	Shooting Stars: The Inside Story	Himself	TV movie
2009	Shockwaves NME Awards 2009	Himself	TV special
2009	Comic Relief 2009	Himself	TV special
2009	Comic-Con '09 Live	Himself	TV movie
2009	Shooting Stars	Himself	Episode #6.5
2009–2010	Late Night with Jimmy Fallon	Himself	Two Episodes
2009–2015	Alan Carr: Chatty Man	Himself	Five Episodes - Series 2, 12 - 15
2009–2015, 2021 -2025	Never Mind the Buzzcocks	Himself	Team Captain beginning series 23. 120 episodes in total
2010	How Not to Live Your Life	Marcus	Episode "Don's New Job"
2010	Shockwaves NME Awards 2010	Himself	TV special
2010	Teenage Cancer Trust Concerts 2010	Himself	TV movie
2010	Channel 4's Comedy Gala	Himself	TV special
2010	Just for Laughs	Himself	Just For Laughs Comedy Festival, Montreal - Episode "Cheech & Chong" - Stand-Up Comedy
2010	Michael McIntyre's Comedy Roadshow	Himself	Episode "Bristol" - Stand-Up Comedy
2010	Channel 4's Comedy Gala	Himself	TV Special
2011	Let's Dance for Sport Relief	Himself	Two Episodes
2011	24 Hour Panel People	Himself	Episode #1.5
2011	Dynamo: Magician Impossible	Himself	Episode "England"
2011	Horrid Henry's Movie Mayhem	Himself	TV movie
2011	Catherine Tate: Laughing at the Noughties	Himself	TV movie
2011	The Rob Brydon Show	Himself	Episode #2.8
2012	The Jonathan Ross Show	Himself	Episode #2.3
2012	The Secret Policeman's Ball	Himself	TV special
2012	Perspectives	Himself	Episode "John Sergeant: Sergeant on Spike"
2012	The Project	Himself	
2012	The Big Fat Quiz of the Decade	Himself	TV Special
2012–2014	Noel Fielding's Luxury Comedy	Himself / Various	
2013	Doll & Em	Noel	Episode "Six"
2013	Brand X with Russell Brand	Himself	Episode #2.1
2013	Gadget Man	Himself	Episode "Summer Holiday"
2013	Staying in with Greg and Russell	Himself	
2013–2018	QI	Himself	Eight episodes
2014	Alan Davies: As Yet Untitled	Himself	Episode "Cupped by a Shammy Hand"
2014	The Last Leg	Himself	Episode #5.2
2015	The Big Fat Anniversary Quiz	Himself	TV special
2015	Backchat	Himself	Episode #2.2
2015	Live at the Apollo	Himself	Episode #11.3 - Stand-Up Comedy
2015	An Evening With Noel Fielding Live	Himself / Various	Both stand-up and sketch comedy, broadcast on Comedy Central.
2016	Room 101	Himself	Episode #5.2
2016	Trailer Park Boys: Out of the Park	Lord Pumpwhistle / Himself	Episode "Europe – London"
2016	The Tonight Show Starring Jimmy Fallon	Himself	2 appearances
2016	The Entire Universe	Einstein	TV movie
2016	Travel Man	Himself	Episode "48 Hours in Copenhagen"
2016	Conan	Himself	1 appearance
2016	@midnight	Himself	
2016	Alan Carr's Happy Hour	Himself	Series 1 Episode 3
2016–2017	The Big Fat Quiz of Everything	Himself	Four Episodes
2017	Taskmaster	Himself	Series Four, Champion of Champions (special)
2017	8 Out of 10 Cats Does Countdown	Himself	Episode #12.1
2017	The One Show	Himself	
2017	Upstart Crow	Thomas Morley	Episode #2.4 "Food of Love"
2017–present	The Great British Bake Off	Co-presenter	Alongside Alison Hammond (2023–present) and formerly Matt Lucas (2020–2022) and Sandi Toksvig (2017–2020), replacing Mel Giedroyc and Sue Perkins
2018	Urban Myths	Alice Cooper	Episode "The Dali and the Cooper"
2018–2023	Disenchantment	Stan the Executioner	Voice
2019	Twelve Forever	Guy Pleasant	Voice
2020	Close Enough	Snail	Voice
2021–present	Never Mind the Buzzcocks	Himself	Team Captain
2024–2025	The Completely Made-Up Adventures of Dick Turpin	Dick Turpin	Main role. TV series
2024–present	Word Race	Himself	

=== Music videos ===
Year	Artist	Song Title	Notes
2000	Midfield General	"Midfielding"	
2003	Mint Royale	"Blue Song"	
2006	Razorlight	"In the Morning"	
2007	Robots in Disguise	"Girl"	
2008	Robots in Disguise	"The Tears"	
2009	Kasabian	"Vlad the Impaler"	Played the titular character
2011	Kate Bush	"Deeper Understanding"	Played a computer junkie
2011	Kasabian	"Re-Wired"	Played the aforementioned Vlad the Impaler.
2016	The Claypool Lennon Delirium	"Bubbles Burst"	
2017	Kasabian	"You're in Love with a Psycho"	
