= Serge Pizzorno =

English musician (born 1980)

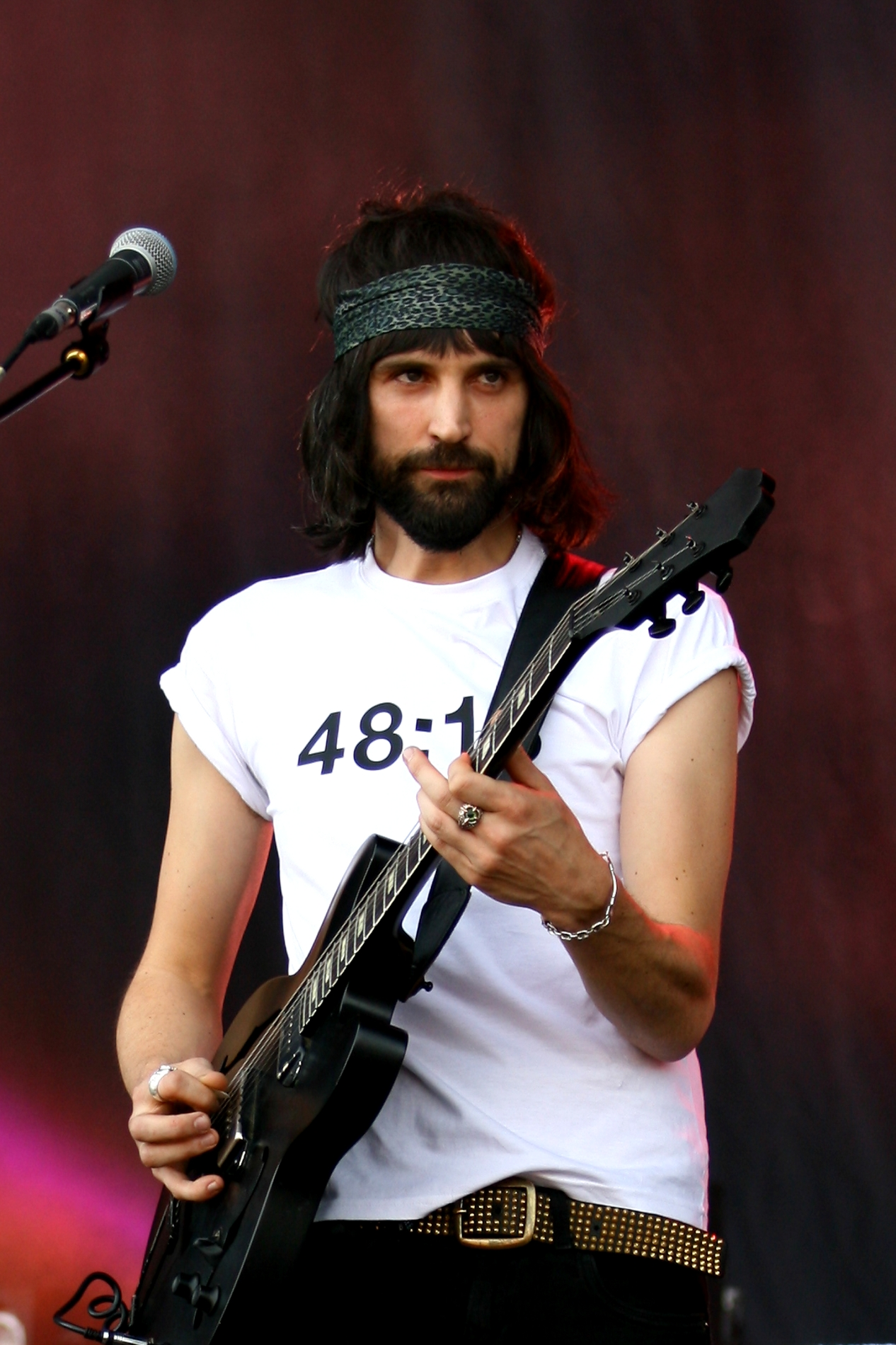
- Pizzorno performing in June 2014

Background information
- Born: Sergio Lorenzo Pizzorno; 15 December 1980 (age 45); Newton Abbot, Devon, England
- Origin: Leicester, England
- Genres: Indie rock; space rock; alternative rock; neo-psychedelia; electronic rock; electronica
- Occupations: Musician; singer; songwriter; record producer
- Instruments: Guitar; vocals; keyboards
- Member of: Kasabian; Loose Tapestries; The S.L.P.
- Website: kasabian.co.uk

Sergio Lorenzo "Serge" Pizzorno (born 15 December 1980) is an English musician, singer, songwriter, artist, and record producer. He is best known as the co-founder, guitarist, and second vocalist of the rock band Kasabian, for whom he became the primary songwriter after the departure of Christopher Karloff in 2006 and the sole vocalist following the firing of Tom Meighan in 2020. He is also a member of Loose Tapestries alongside Noel Fielding and fellow Kasabian member Tim Carter, a group put together to produce music for Fielding's TV series Noel Fielding's Luxury Comedy.

== Early life ==
Sergio Lorenzo Pizzorno was born in Newton Abbot on 15 December 1980. His Italian paternal grandfather moved to England from Genoa and settled in Leicester, where Pizzorno was raised. He has said that the only reason he was born in Newton Abbot is because his mother liked the hospital there. He originally intended to become a footballer, telling his careers adviser that he wanted to be "centre forward for Leicester City". He also began supporting Genoa CFC after his uncle took him to the Luigi Ferraris Stadium when he was visiting the family in Italy as a child.

== Career ==
Pizzorno is an admirer of Oasis, in particular former lead guitarist Noel Gallagher. He has said that "at our school, if you played guitar you got beat up for being a ponce. Then Oasis came along and suddenly playing guitar was cool. They inspired a whole generation of bands. When we started out as kids, it was Noel Gallagher who inspired me more than any teacher or historical figure I'd heard about." "For Oasis to ask us to go with them is an honour and a pleasure. I imagine they see a lot of themselves in us and I don't imagine they'd go on tour with a band they didn't like."

Kasabian are consistently referred to as an indie rock band, but, Pizzorno has said "We've never been an indie band, you know, and I sort of fucking hate indie bands." He has referred to the band's music as "future rock".

Following Pizzorno's decision to become the band's frontman after parting ways with Tom Meighan, he prepared for the role by studying his favorite artists such as Tyler, the Creator, Iggy Pop, Björk, PJ Harvey, Liam Howlett and Liam Gallagher.

=== Other work ===
Pizzorno has also worked with former Kasabian lead guitarist and songwriter Chris Karloff on the DJ Shadow track "The Tiger" from the album The Outsider. In August 2006, Pizzorno appeared on Soccer AM, where he took part in the "Road to Wembley II" segment, scoring a volley while wearing a pair of cowboy-style boots.

Pizzorno was at Wembley Stadium in November 2010 to make the draw for the FA Cup third round proper, along with former Oasis guitarist and good friend Noel Gallagher.

In 2010, he composed the music for the movie London Boulevard, starring Colin Farrell, Ray Winstone and Keira Knightley.

In 2011, Pizzorno joined forces with friend Noel Fielding to create music for his new E4 sketch show Noel Fielding's Luxury Comedy. They formed a project called Loose Tapestries. Together, they also wrote the music for the second series of the show, which aired in 2014.

Pizzorno was one of the celebrities to take part in the 2012 edition of Soccer Aid, a charity football match played by celebrities and ex-footballers, on 27 May. He played for the Rest of the World team against England and scored the opening goal of the game, lobbing former England international goalkeeper David Seaman from a tight angle. Although the Rest of the World went on to lose 3–1, Pizzorno won the Man of the Match award.

He also appears on the album Beyond Ugly by Bristol band Malachai.

In May 2019, Pizzorno launched a solo project under the name The S.L.P.; his first single was called "Favourites" and it featured British rapper Little Simz.

Pizzorno is listed as an executive producer on the film Walk Like a Panther (2018).

== Personal life ==
Pizzorno has described experiencing symptoms suggestive of synaesthesia; for example, he once saw a magician's equipment on television, which caused him to smell odours so foul that they triggered his gag reflex and made him lose his appetite. In another incident, he claimed the impulse buy of a Ford Focus was triggered by seeing Garth Crooks on an episode of Football Focus.

== Equipment ==
Pizzorno has played a red Rickenbacker 481 guitar in nearly all of Kasabian's music videos (excluding the video for "Switchblade Smiles") and nearly all their live performances. He also uses another rare guitar, a red 1966 Fender Coronado II with a golden pickguard, notable for unique guitar sound from their 2009 single "Underdog" despite the Rickenbacker 481 being shown in the music video. The Fender Coronado is used for their live performances of the song. The Fender Coronado is also used during live performances of their 2009 song "Where Did All the Love Go?"

Pizzorno's guitars include:

- FireGlo Rickenbacker 481
- JetGlo Rickenbacker 481
- MapleGlo Rickenbacker 480
- Red 1966 Fender Coronado II
- Vox Ultrasonic
- Epiphone Casino (resprayed with matte black finish)
- White Vox teardrop (resprayed with matte black finish)
- Mick Johnson Vox Teardrop
- A matte black Fender Jazzmaster
- Vox semi acoustic
- Gibson ES-335
- Gibson J-160e acoustic
- Gibson Hummingbird
- Gibson J-200
- 1950s Höfner Senator
- Zemaitis GZA200-SUN-NT

== Discography ==
With Kasabian

- Kasabian (2004)
- Empire (2006)
- West Ryder Pauper Lunatic Asylum (2009)
- Velociraptor! (2011)
- 48:13 (2014)
- For Crying Out Loud (2017)
- The Alchemist's Euphoria (2022)
- Happenings (2024)
- Act III (2026)

With Loose Tapestries

- Loose Tapestries Presents the Luxury Comedy Tapes (2012) – production, various instruments
- N.H.S. (2015)

With The S.L.P.

- The S.L.P. (2019)
