= Dorothy Koomson =

English writer (born 1971)

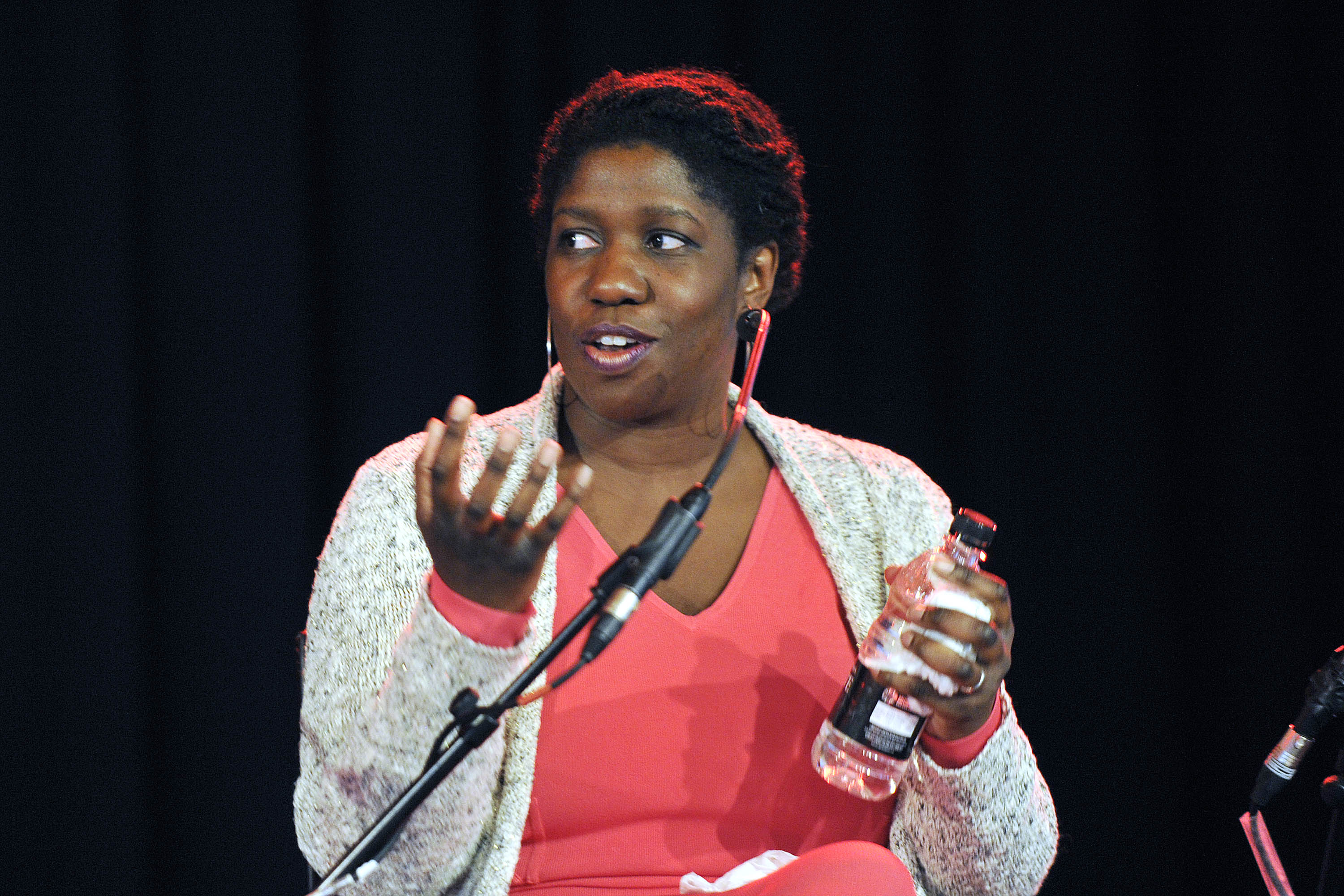
- 2014
- Born: 1971 (age 54–55); London, England
- Education: Leeds University (Trinity and All Saints College)
- Occupation: Writer
- Writing career
- Period: 2003–present
- Genre: Fiction
- Website: dorothykoomson.co.uk

Dorothy Koomson (born 1971 in London) is a contemporary British novelist of Ghanaian descent. She has been described as "Britain's biggest selling black author of adult fiction".

== Biography ==
Koomson has two degrees in Psychology and Journalism from Leeds University (Trinity and All Saints College). She has written for a number of women's magazines and newspapers, and has more than a dozen successful novels published in the UK and US. Koomson spent two years living in Sydney, Australia, and from 2007 on is currently living in Brighton, England.

Koomson wrote her first novel, the unpublished "There's A Thin Line Between Love And Hate", when she was 13. In 2003, her debut novel, The Cupid Effect, was published. Her second novel, The Chocolate Run, was published in 2004. In 2006, she published her third novel, My Best Friend's Girl. The book was chosen for the Richard and Judy's Summer Reads shortlist and it received a huge sales boost. Koomson's fourth and fifth novels, Marshmallows For Breakfast and Goodnight, Beautiful, were published in 2007 and 2008 respectively. Koomson's sixth novel, The Ice Cream Girls, was published in 2010. Koomson's seventh novel, The Woman He Loved Before, was released on 3 February 2011. Her eighth book, The Rose Petal Beach, came out in August 2012 and was released in paperback form in April 2013. Her ninth book, The Flavours of Love, was published in November 2013, after which she took a longer break before writing her tenth book, That Girl From Nowhere, which was published in April 2015. Her novels have been translated into more than 30 languages.

During the 2020 Black Lives Matter protests calling for racial justice, Koomson criticised the UK publishing industry as being a "hostile environment for black authors", stating that those in the industry have gaslighted Black authors and demeaned, demoralised, and discarded them in reality, while portraying an image of support to the public. Her experiences in the publishing industry were also discussed in an article responding to the "Rethinking 'Diversity' in Publishing" report.

Later that year, Koomson was recognised as one of the United Kingdom's 100 most influential people of African or African Caribbean heritage when she was included in the 2021 edition of the annual Powerlist. She is very much concerned about increasing child literacy, as according to a National Literacy Trust study in 2024 "just 1 in 3 children in the UK enjoy reading, the lowest percentage since 2005".

In 2020 Koomson launched a podcast intended to help 'demystify the book world'.

She was one of the judges for the Women's Prize for Fiction 2022.

== In popular culture ==
- The television adaptation of Koomson's novel The Ice Cream Girls by Left Bank Pictures was shown on ITV in the UK in 2013 and had nearly 5 million viewers.
- Koomson's work was referenced in Bernardine Evaristo's Booker Prize-winning novel Girl, Woman, Other.

== Bibliography ==
- The Cupid Effect, 2003
- The Chocolate Run, 2004
- My Best Friend's Girl, 2006
- Marshmallows For Breakfast, 2007
- Goodnight, Beautiful, 2008
- The Ice Cream Girls, 2010
- The Woman He Loved Before, 2011
- The Rose Petal Beach, 2012
- The Flavours of Love, 2013
- That Girl From Nowhere, 2015
- When I Was Invisible, 2015
- The Friend, 2017
- The Beach Wedding (Quick Reads), 2018
- The Brighton Mermaid, 2018
- Tell Me Your Secret, 2019
- All My Lies Are True (Ice Cream Girls 2), 2020
- I Know What You've Done, 2021
- My Other Husband, 2022
- Every Smile You Fake, 2024
