= Bunny and the Bull =

2009 British comedy film by Paul King

- Theatrical release poster
- Directed by: Paul King
- Written by: Paul King
- Produced by: Mary Burke; Mark Herbert; Robin Gutch
- Starring: Edward Hogg; Simon Farnaby; Verónica Echegui; Noel Fielding; Julian Barratt; Richard Ayoade
- Cinematography: John Sorapure
- Edited by: Mark Everson
- Music by: Ralfe Band; Love
- Production companies: Warp X Productions; Wild Bunch; Film4; ITV Yorkshire; ITV London; Screen Yorkshire; UK Film Council
- Distributed by: Optimum Releasing
- Release dates: 23 October 2009 (London Film Festival); 27 November 2009
- Running time: 101 minutes
- Country: United Kingdom
- Language: English
- Budget: £750,000
- Box office: $81,010

Bunny and the Bull is a 2009 British comedy film written and directed by Paul King. It stars Edward Hogg and Simon Farnaby in a surreal recreation of a road trip. King has previously worked on British television comedies The Mighty Boosh and Garth Marenghi's Darkplace; the film is made in a similar style and has cameo appearances from stars of those series.

== Plot ==
Stephen is an agoraphobic recluse who has not left his flat in nearly a year. Each of his days are structured around carefully planned routines, but one day his routine is disrupted when he discovers an infestation of mice in the kitchen cupboards. He contemplates leaving the flat to buy mouse traps, but can not bring himself to open the door, so he reminisces about the events leading up to his current situation, with objects around the flat triggering flash backs.

One year earlier, after being "friend zoned" by the woman he loved, Stephen went on a sightseeing holiday across Europe with his friend Bunny, who is addicted to gambling. They visit several bizarre museums, but Bunny finds them all boring and is more concerned with seducing women. At a seafood restaurant in Poland, Stephen and Bunny meet Eloisa, a Spanish waitress who has recently left her boyfriend and plans to return to Spain for an upcoming fiesta. Bunny wins the restaurant's delivery car in a bet, and Eloisa accompanies them on their journey towards Spain. They stop at a hostel in Switzerland, where Stephen plans to ask Eloisa on a date, only to discover that she has already started a sexual relationship with Bunny.

When they arrive in Spain, Eloisa is reunited with her brother Javier, an aspiring matador. Bunny decides he wants to fight a bull, so asks Javier to teach him everything he knows about bullfighting. Javier shows him a prized matador suit he keeps in a display cabinet, which Bunny later steals and subsequently loses in a bet. Elsewhere, Eloisa falls in love with Stephen and they sleep together, but the next morning Bunny explains about the lost matador suit and urges Stephen to come with him as he flees Spain. Eloisa finds out about the suit and breaks up with Stephen. On the train ride home, Stephen angrily confronts Bunny about his recklessness, but he misinterprets Stephen's frustrations as a challenge, so that night Bunny sneaks into a field and attempts to fight a bull. The bull kills him, and Stephen is left traumatised. When he returns home, Stephen's guilt develops into agoraphobia, and he has remained in his flat ever since.

In the present day, Stephen imagines a conversation with the ghost of Bunny, who asserts that his death was not Stephen's fault and urges him to talk to Eloisa. This conversation gives Stephen the confidence he needs to overcome his anxiety, so he contacts Eloisa and gains enough courage to leave the flat.

== Cast ==
- Edward Hogg as Stephen Turnbull
- Simon Farnaby as Bunny
- Verónica Echegui as Eloisa
- Noel Fielding as Javier
- Richard Ayoade as Museum Curator
- Julian Barratt as Atilla
- Rich Fulcher as Captain Crab (voice)

== Production ==
The film was produced by Mary Burke of Warp X, with financing from Film4, UK Film Council, EM Media and Screen Yorkshire. It was filmed at King's Meadow Campus of the University of Nottingham over 5 weeks. Paul King, having previously directed and associate directed cult favourites The Mighty Boosh and Garth Marenghi's Darkplace respectively on television, uses a similar surreal, nonsensical, and occasional dark style in the film. Like many projects made by ex-contributors of Garth Marenghi and Boosh, the film features several other ex-contributors such as Noel Fielding, Julian Barratt, Richard Ayoade and Simon Farnaby, along with animation sequences by Nigel Coan. King admits "I’ve basically cast it off my speed-dial."

== Reception ==
Bunny and the Bull received mostly positive reviews. Empire rated the film at four stars (out of a maximum five), describing it as "charmingly crafted and willfully daft". The film was compared to Michel Gondry's 2004 film Eternal Sunshine of the Spotless Mind in theme and appearance, with the exception that Bunny and the Bull "manages to tramp down its whimsy with a rich vein of very silly, very British comedy". Charles Watson of underground film magazine Slant said it was "a daft tale of wit and woe, with recognisable actors that go straight into their comfort zones making it as crafty and clever as possible."
