= Alice Lowe =

English actress, writer, and comedian (born 1977)

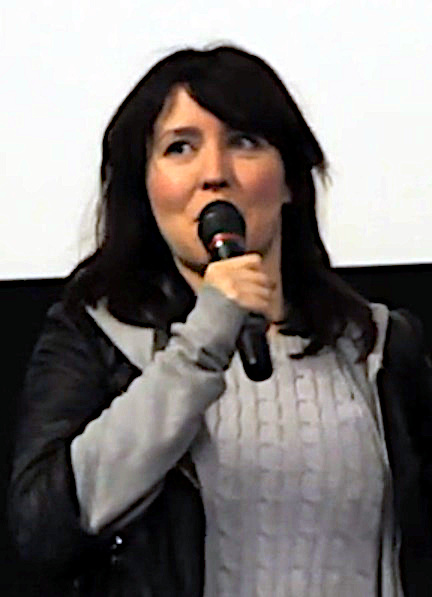
- Lowe in 2012
- Born: Alice Eva Lowe; 3 April 1977 (age 49); Coventry, West Midlands, England
- Education: King's College, Cambridge
- Occupations: Comedian; actress; writer; director
- Children: 2

Alice Eva Lowe (born 3 April 1977) is an English actress, writer, director, and comedian. She has appeared as Dr. Haynes in Black Mirror: Bandersnatch and Madeleine Wool/Liz Asher in Garth Marenghi's Darkplace. She wrote, directed, and starred in the 2016 film Prevenge and starred in and co-wrote the 2012 film Sightseers. She also starred in the educational children's television series Horrible Histories.

== Early life ==
Lowe was born in Coventry, West Midlands, England. She attended Kenilworth School and graduated from King's College, Cambridge, where she studied classics. At university she became involved in theatre and comedy.

== Career ==
Lowe began her career in surreal experimental theatre shows including City Haunts, Snowbound and Progress in Flying Machines co-devising and performing along with colleagues such as Robert Webb and David Mitchell.

Lowe worked under the directorship of Paul King, who has since directed her in The Mighty Boosh and Garth Marenghi's Darkplace. She was cast in Garth Marenghi's Fright Knight alongside fellow Cambridge graduates Richard Ayoade and Matt Holness and they were nominated for the Perrier Award at the Edinburgh Fringe in 2000. In 2001, she won an award for performing in the sequel to Fright Knight, Garth Marenghi's Netherhead, at the Edinburgh Festival Fringe.

Her television credits include Channel 4's spoof horror comedy Garth Marenghi's Darkplace, Beth in the BBC comedy series My Life in Film, David Bowie in the BBC series Snuff Box, and a recurring role in Rob Brydon's Annually Retentive. She was part of the all-female comedy show Beehive along with Sarah Kendall, Barunka O'Shaughnessy and Clare Thomson which was aired on E4, and was a regular cast member of the CBBC show Horrible Histories during the second, third and fifth seasons. Her BBC Three pilot "LifeSpam: My Child Is French" was broadcast in 2009, and she co-wrote and starred in Channel 4's Orcadia. In February 2010, she appeared in and script-edited the pilot for a "sort-of-sketch-show" called Missing Scene.

She has also guest starred as Monkey in "The Priest and the Beast" episode of The Mighty Boosh, as Patricia in the "Fifty-Fifty" episode of The IT Crowd, a solicitor in the "Travel Writer" episode of Black Books, Madonna in an episode of Channel 4's Star Stories, and episodes of Little Britain, Come Fly with Me, Ruddy Hell! It's Harry and Paul, Beautiful People and This is Jinsy. She appeared in the music video for "Bastardo" by Charlotte Hatherley, directed by Edgar Wright.

Lowe co-wrote and starred in the short film Stiffy, directed by Jacqueline Wright, which premiered at Cannes in 2005 as part of the Kodak Straight 8 competition. Her self-penned short film Sticks and Balls was screened at Cannes in 2007. In 2010 together with Wright she founded the production company Jackal Films, making a short film each month of that year.

Lowe appeared in the action comedy film Hot Fuzz, and took a lead role in the 2012 film Sightseers, the third production from director Ben Wheatley. Sightseers was written by Lowe with Steve Oram, with additional material by Amy Jump. Lowe had a role in the Edgar Wright-directed film The World's End.

On BBC Radio 4, she has written three series of Alice's Wunderland a dark, surreal comedy.

In 2016, she made her directorial debut on the critically acclaimed Prevenge, which she directed while pregnant. In 2018, Lowe appeared as Dr Haynes in Netflix's first adult-targeted interactive film, Black Mirror: Bandersnatch.

In February 2021, Lowe's film Timestalker was announced. The film will "chronicle one woman's unrequited love across several centuries [...] from 1680s Western Scotland to the apocalyptic 22nd Century." Lowe stated that "[t]his film is my homage to the most romantic epics. Lavish, lush and overflowing with emotion." Filming began in late 2022 and it was released October 2024.

== Personal life ==
Lowe was pregnant while filming Prevenge and later gave birth to her daughter Della with partner Paul Synnott.

== Filmography ==
=== Film ===
Year	Title	Role	Notes
2007	Hot Fuzz	Tina	
2011	Kill List	Radio Reporter	
2012	Sightseers	Tina	Also writer
2013	The World's End	Young Lady	
2014	Locke	Sister Margaret	Voice
2014	Paddington	Geographer's Receptionist	
2014	Electricity	Sylvia	
2015	Aaaaaaaah!	Sitcom Eudora	
2015	Burn Burn Burn	Davina	
2015	Black Mountain Poets	Lisa Walker	
2016	Adult Life Skills	Alice	
2016	Stoner Express	Roxy	
2016	Prevenge	Ruth	Also writer and director
2016	Chubby Funny	Susan	
2016	The Ghoul	Kathleen	
2018	Wild Honey Pie	Gerry	
2018	Solis	Commander Roberts	Voice
2018	Sometimes Always Never	Sue	
2018	The Fight	Heather	
2018	Black Mirror: Bandersnatch	Dr. Haynes	
2019	Eternal Beauty		
2019	Dark Encounter	Arlene	
2019	Days of the Bagnold Summer	Carol	
2022	Paso Doble	Karen	Short film
2024	Timestalker	Agnes	Also writer and director
2025	Saipan	Fiona McCarthy	
2026	Rogue Trooper		
2026	Out There	Seren	

=== Television ===
Year	Title	Role	Notes
2001–2002, 2006	Comedy Lab	Various characters	3 episodes, also writer of Orcadia
2004	Garth Marenghi's Darkplace	Liz Asher / Madeleine Wool	6 episodes
2004	Black Books	Solicitor	Episode: "Travel Writer"
2004	My Life in Film	Beth	6 episodes
2005	The Mighty Boosh	Monkey	Episode: "The Priest & the Beast"
2005	Little Britain	Mother on Bench / Woman on Bench	2 episodes
2006	The IT Crowd	Patricia	Episode: "Fifty-Fifty"
2006	Snuff Box	David Bowie	Episode: "Matt's Diary"
2006	Star Stories	Madonna	Episode: "The Wife's Life"
2006	Man to Man with Dean Learner	Various roles	Episode: "Merriman Weir"
2006	Pulling	Alice	Episode #1.6
2006–2007	Annually Retentive	Various roles	3 episodes
2007	Angelo's	Alicia	6 episodes
2008	Beehive	Various roles	5 episodes, also writer
2008–2012	Ruddy Hell! It's Harry and Paul	Various characters	12 episodes
2009	LifeSpam: My Child Is French	Various characters	Television film, also writer
2009	Beautiful People	Stacey Bile	Episode: "How I Got My Turner"
2010	Come Fly with Me	Young Mum	Episode #1.1
2010–2011, 2013	Horrible Histories	Various characters	12 episodes
2011, 2014	This is Jinsy	Soosan Noop	16 episodes
2012	Skins	Jemima	Episode: "Franky"
2014	Sherlock	Tessa	Episode: "The Sign of Three"
2015	Inside No. 9	Amanda	Episode: "Séance Time"
2017	Carters Get Rich	Sue Golding	Episode: "Co-Creator"
2018	Flowers	Paula	Episode #2.4
2018	Hang Ups	Celia Cain	3 episodes
2021	Back	Joanna	Episode #2.6
2023	Lockwood & Co.	Adelaide Winkman	Two episodes
2023	Partygate	Shelley Williams-Walker	

=== Audio ===
Year	Title	Role	Notes
2011–2015	Alice's Wunderland	Various	Writer and creator, BBC Radio 4
2018	The Hellbound Heart	Kirsty	
2021	The Sink: A Sleep Aid	Narrator	
2024	The Mysterious Affair at Styles		Director, Audible original
