= Kim Noble =

British comedian

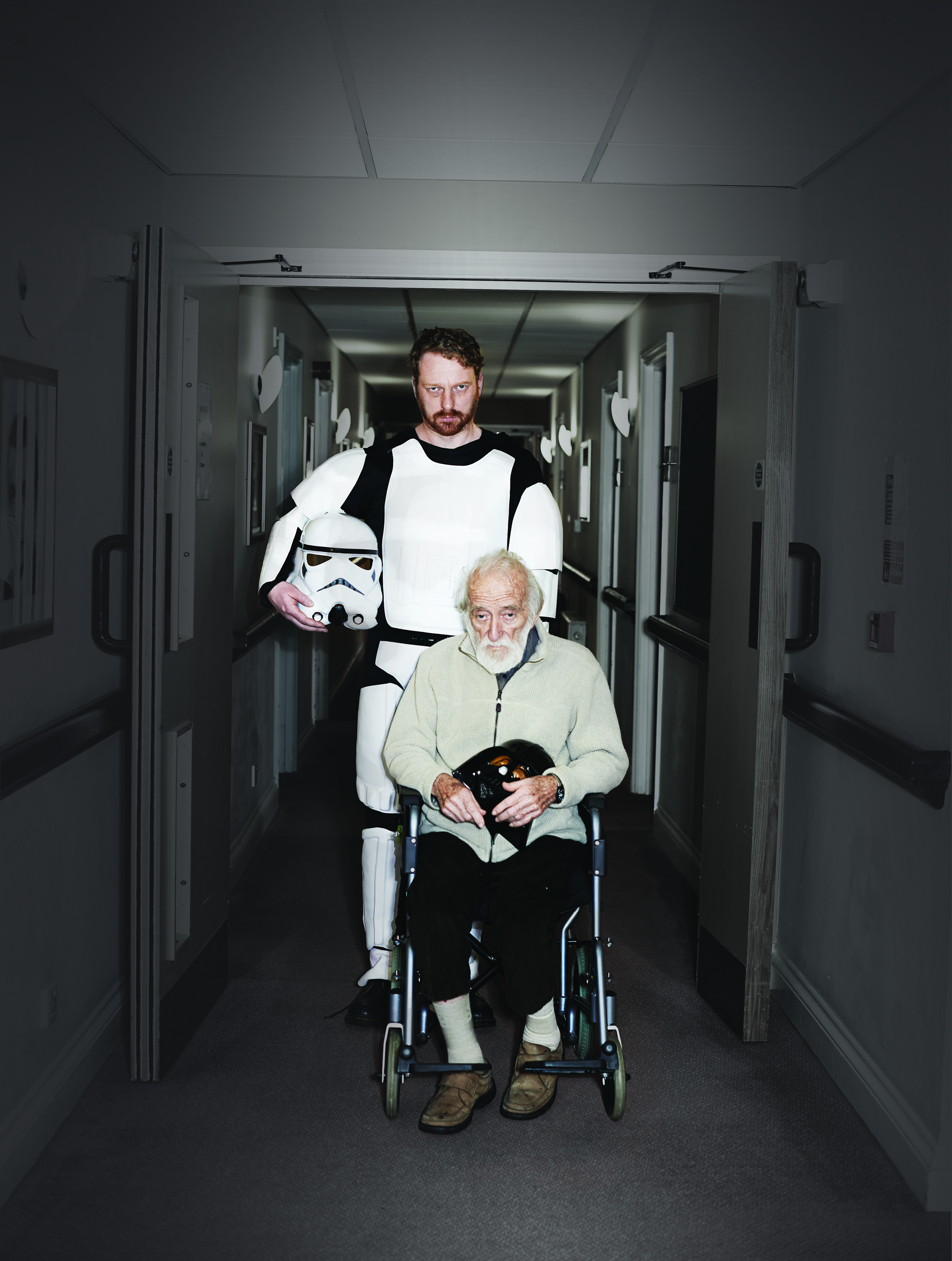
- Noble (left) in a promotional shoot for You're Not Alone
- Born: 15 September 1960 (age 66)
- Occupations: Actor, comedian, artist

Kim Noble (born 15 September 1960) is a British comedian and artist, and was one half of the BAFTA-nominated comedy duo Noble and Silver, who won the 2000 Perrier Award for Best Newcomer. He has featured in shows such as The Mighty Boosh, Garth Marenghi's Darkplace, and Man to Man with Dean Learner, as well as appearing onstage in his own one-man shows and exhibitions. His stage work, by himself and with Stuart Silver, had an emphasis on performance art, as well as surreal comedy.

== Career ==
=== Noble and Silver ===
Kim Noble and his writing and performance partner Stuart Silver first came to national prominence upon winning the Best Newcomer Perrier Award in 2000. Trained in Fine Art at Sheffield Hallam University, the duo received as much praise from the art community as from comedy aficionados. This work draws together visual art, stand-up, theatre, and performance art.

Post-Perrier shows as Noble and Silver include Pleasance Above at the 2001 Edinburgh Festival Fringe, a collage of video, recorded sound and performance and a month-long residency in London's Beaconsfield art space, entitled We're Spending Four Weeks at Beaconsfield, So Let's Hope Everything Goes OK (Part 4) Throughout this time in residence, they performed daily "situational" shows within and around the gallery, which became a live work environment, using a small cast to become a part of the visitor's art experience: from screening a spoof corporate video upon entrance, to altering gallery signage, to preparing and serving food from the kitchen.

In Spring 2001, the UK digital channel E4 commissioned a six-part series entitled Noble and Silver: Get Off Me!. It included an episode where the duo performed in a theatre an intentionally bad act, seemingly imploding as a partnership onstage. This act was performed solely for a couple unaware that they were placed among an audience of actors who were in on the joke, and who were addressed by the act and the audience afterwards.

=== Solo work ===
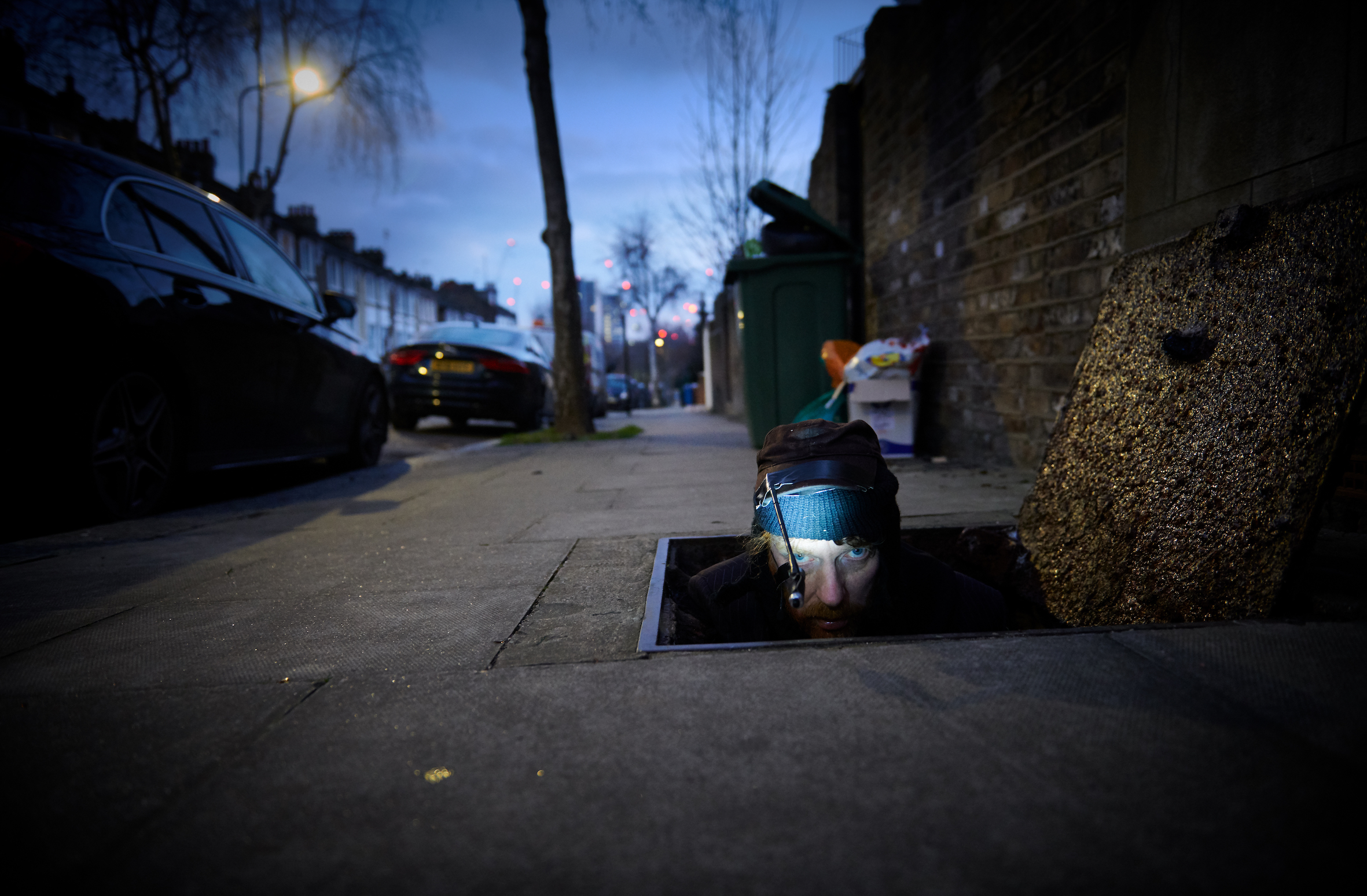
Noble in Lullaby For Scavengers

Noble's solo work as an actor and performer has gone on to include television and stage work. He played the role of Jim in three episodes of Garth Marenghi's Darkplace: "Once Upon A Beginning", "Hell Hath Fury", and "The Apes of Wrath". He also featured in the Garth Marenghi episode of Man to Man with Dean Learner, as well as the episodes with Merriman Weir and Randolph Caer. He has also appeared in series three of The Mighty Boosh, as Jackie in Journey to the Centre of The Punk.

Noble also appeared as a drunken Santa who staggers around London in the video for Malcolm Middleton's 2007 Christmas single, "We're All Going To Die".

Noble also continues to pursue his career as an artist. His solo work has featured a performance at 2007's Bonkersfest! festival, Kim Noble Will Invest in You at Alma Enterprises, and Considerations for an Island Race at Whitstable Biennial 2008.

In April 2009 at the Soho Theatre, he premiered Kim Noble Will Die, billed as a multi-media suicide note, in which he discussed his mental illness and suicidal impulses at length, noting his plans to throw himself to his death from Waterloo Bridge on 27 May 2009. He performed a version of the same show at the 2009 Edinburgh Festival, where he threatened to jump to his death from Edinburgh's North Bridge. The show gained an unprecedented 6 stars out of 5 in Time Out London, describing Noble as "a genius".

As of March 2013, he remains alive and has an exhibition taking place at Market Gallery, Glasgow.

=== You're Not Alone ===
He apparently worked undercover for 6 months in B&Q a british hardware store, wearing the same uniform as staff members, without any one knowing. Details of this were recorded and used for a live show. His critically acclaimed show premiered at The Traverse Theatre Edinburgh in August 2014 and was almost cancelled after the first night due to moral and ethical issues with the show. However, it went on to play Soho Theatre for 10 weeks and won a Total Theatre Award in 2014 and was nominated for two Chortle Awards.

=== Futile Attempts podcast ===
In 2020, Noble released a podcast called Futile Attempts (At Surviving Tomorrow). The podcast is part documentary part comedy part audio soundscape. Described by The Guardian as "bleak, blissed-out game of chicken with the abyss, in 20-minute audio instalments." It was nominated for Best Comedy Award by the Radio Academy Awards.

=== Lullaby For Scavengers ===
Lullaby For Scavengers is billed as the third part of a theatrical trilogy on loneliness and connection. Following the provocative hit shows Kim Noble Will Die and You’re Not Alone. For the show, Noble lived next to a fox den in London and befriended a fox family, recording the results. The show was produced by Belgium-based arts centre CAMPO.

=== Other work ===
Noble directed Estonian clown Julia Masli's critically acclaimed show ha ha ha ha ha ha ha, which debuted at the 2023 Edinburgh Festival Fringe and went on to tour Europe and the U.S.

According to his website, a book is in production.
