= Edinburgh Festival Fringe 2001 =

2001 performing arts festival

The 2001 Edinburgh Festival Fringe was the 54th Edinburgh Festival Fringe. The Fringe ran from 5–27 August 2001 and presented 1462 shows over 176 venues.

== Awards ==
=== Theatre ===
==== Scotsman Fringe First Awards ====
Week One:

- Gagarin Way
- Runt
- Like Thunder
- Bedbound
- Ferdydurke

Week Two:

- Man in the Flying Lawn Chair
- Moving Objects
- Raw
- Jesus Hopped the A Train
- Neutrino

Week Three:

- School for Fools
- Upside Down
- Cracked
- Mental
- Midden

=== Comedy ===
==== Perrier Comedy Awards ====
Winner:

- Garth Marenghi's Netherhead (Richard Ayoade, Matthew Holness and Alice Lowe)

Nominees:

- Jason Byrne
- Adam Hills - Go You Big Red Fire Engine
- Daniel Kitson - Love, Innocence And The Word Cock
- Dan Antopolski - Antopolski 2000

===== Best Newcomer Award =====
Winner:

- Garth Cruickshank and Eddie McCabe - Let's Have a Shambles

Nominees:

- Andy Zaltzman versus the Dog of Doom
- Danny Bhoy
- Cambridge Footlights - Far too Happy (Edward Jaspers, Tim Key, Dan Macaskill, James Morris, Mark Watson and Sophie Winkleman)
