= Dean Learner =

- First appearance: Garth Marenghi's Fright Knight
- Created by: Richard Ayoade; Matthew Holness
- Portrayed by: Richard Ayoade

In-universe information
- Gender: Male
- Occupation: Publisher
- Nationality: British

Dean Learner is a fictional character performed by British comedian Richard Ayoade in Garth Marenghi's Darkplace, a horror parody television series, as well as in Man to Man with Dean Learner, a parody talk show. Learner, a mix between Donald Trump (as he owns his own Dean tower) and Hugh Hefner (because of his harem of girlfriends wearing uniforms) is a self-proclaimed club-owner, entrepreneur and publisher of high-class gentlemen magazines. He is also the publisher for author Garth Marenghi, played by Matthew Holness.

Dean Learner first appeared in the Edinburgh Fringe stage shows Garth Marenghi's Fright Knight and Garth Marenghi's Netherhead in 2000 and 2001 respectively. In 2004, he appeared in Channel 4's spoof horror comedy Garth Marenghi's Darkplace, and in 2006 in his own TV show, Man to Man with Dean Learner, which aired on Channel 4 from October 2006. It was recorded at Teddington Studios in April–May 2006 in front of a live audience and featured Learner interviewing fictional celebrity guests – all of whom happened to be his clients (and played by Ayoade's writing partner Matthew Holness) – including Marenghi.

== Character ==
Learner is Garth Marenghi's publisher, and regards Marenghi and his (highly dubious) talents with a respect that sometimes borders on worship. He also plays the role of Thornton Reed, a camp hospital administrator in Garth Marenghi's Darkplace.

In addition to publishing Marenghi's books and featuring in Marenghi's TV show, Learner is involved in several other side projects. One such venture is his management of the Formula Five motor racing team, "The Dean Team" which achieved significant success with driver Steve Pising winning four world titles. However, after departing The Dean Team, it is revealed that Pising experienced a major crash in his inaugural race with a new team, prompting speculation about Learner's potential involvement. After a hiatus, Pising collaborated with Learner again on a new TV show, "The Learner" where they conducted auditions for a position at Pising Parts, now under Learner's ownership.

Additionally, Dean has authored his autobiography, titled "I Have A Dean".

Ayoade portrays Learner as a notably sleazy and unscrupulous individual. The character appears devoid of emotion or the capacity to empathize with others, which may contribute to his perceived lack of acting prowess in Garth Marenghi's Darkplace. For instance, in the Darkplace special features, when questioned about the fate of "Ahmed" the original financial backer of Darkplace, Learner callously states, "Ahmed very sadly died. He was shot dead in his flat". In another interview included in the Darkplace special features, Learner hints that when Marenghi partnered with another manager in the '80s, that manager swiftly met an untimely demise, leading Marenghi to return to Learner. Furthermore, there are implications that Learner possesses knowledge regarding the disappearance of Darkplace co-star Madeleine Wool, who portrayed Liz Asher. He also makes reference to an incident in which he punches one of the child actors in the head. Although Dean seems to be genuinely friendly with Garth and character actor Todd Rivers (played by Matt Berry), his relationship with other clients, colleagues and business associates of his are shown in Man to Man with Dean Learner as being more manipulative. In the sixth episode of Man to Man with Dean Learner, Dean and his cadre are shown as being primarily responsible for the public humiliation of character actor Randolph Caer (played by Matthew Holness), by advertising a ball to raise awareness against pubic lice using Caer's photograph.

== Sexuality ==
Despite Learner's camp dress sense, he denies being homosexual. He has also been involved in pornography, including Channel Ladykiss.

A large part of the comedic appeal of the Dean Learner character is his odd and off-putting sexual life. In Man to Man with Dean Learner, Learner often makes awkward and unsolicited allusions to his sex life, and to his harem of girlfriends, that he refers to as "my girls". In the fictional TV show "The Learner", Learner shows favouritism only to the female contestant, and is shown to leave the set with her after shooting. In the DVD extras of Man to Man with Dean Learner, he lets his guest know that he needs to take a break to have intercourse. After having done so, he comes to his assistant to get his mouth wiped and calls her "Mommy".
