= Stuart Silver =

British comedian, award-winning screenwriter, television writer, actor and director

- Born: United Kingdom
- Education: Sheffield Hallam University
- Occupations: Writer, director, actor

Stuart Silver is a screenwriter, television writer, actor and director. He works solo and collaboratively and is co-founder of the BAFTA-nominated, performance duo Noble and Silver, who won the 2000 Perrier Award for Best Newcomer. Silver has since appeared on stage in his own one-man show, You Look Like Ants and in shorter pieces. He has also featured in television shows such as Get Off Me, The Mighty Boosh, Garth Marenghi's Darkplace, and Man to Man with Dean Learner.

== Career ==
=== Noble and Silver ===
Silver and his writing and performance partner Kim Noble first came to national prominence upon winning the Best Newcomer Perrier Award in 2000. Trained in fine art at Sheffield Hallam University, the duo received as much praise from the art community as from comedy aficionados. Their work drew together visual art, stand-up, theatre, spoken word and performance art.

Noble and Silver's post-Perrier shows include the 2001 Edinburgh Festival Fringe show in Pleasance Above which was a collage of video, recorded sound and performance and a month-long residency in London's Beaconsfield art space, entitled We're Spending Four Weeks at Beaconsfield, So Let's Hope Everything Goes OK.

In spring 2001, the UK digital channel, E4 commissioned a six-part series entitled Noble and Silver: Get Off Me!.

=== Solo work ===
In 2010, Silver created a solo piece You Look Like Ants and performed it at the London Word Festival and Soho Theatre. You Look Like Ants is a monologue and musical performance that interweaves several narratives non-sequentially. He plays electric ukulele during the piece.

Silver has twice collaborated with the contemporary performance duo Lone Twin, co-writing and co-directing Cabaret Simon for The Barbican, London in December 2009. For Lone Twin, he also produced the in-show video for Beastie.

Stuart is the lead mentor for musician, spoken word artist collaborations for Phrased & Confused.
