= Garth Marenghi's Darkplace =

2004 British horror parody television series

- Front cover of DVD release
- Genre: Horror; Parody
- Created by: Richard Ayoade; Matthew Holness
- Based on: Garth Marenghi's Fright Knight by: Richard Ayoade; Matthew Holness
- Written by: Richard Ayoade; Matthew Holness
- Directed by: Richard Ayoade
- Starring: Matthew Holness; Matt Berry; Richard Ayoade; Alice Lowe
- Composer: Andrew Hewitt
- Country of origin: United Kingdom
- No. of series: 1
- No. of episodes: 6

Production
- Producer: Charlie Hanson
- Running time: 25 minutes
- Production company: Avalon Television

Original release
- Network: Channel 4
- Release: 29 January – 4 March 2004

Related
- Man to Man with Dean Learner

Garth Marenghi's Darkplace is a British horror parody television series created by Richard Ayoade and Matthew Holness for Channel 4. The show focuses on fictional horror author Garth Marenghi (played by Holness) and his publisher Dean Learner (played by Ayoade), characters who originated in the stage show Garth Marenghi's Fright Knight.

The series is presented as a special release of the fictional television series Darkplace. Within the reality of the show, Darkplace was produced in the 1980s for Channel 4, but never broadcast anywhere but Peru, eventually becoming a lost series. Saved footage has recently resurfaced, with Marenghi republishing with the intent of gaining interest from a modern audience. The "original footage" of the show is intercut or bookended with commentary from many of the "original" cast, where characters such as Marenghi and Learner reflect on what it was like to make the show. Darkplace parodies the fashion, special effects, production gaffes, and music of low-budget '80s television, as well as the arrogant attitude of certain writers and performers.

Garth Marenghi's Darkplace was broadcast in a late-night timeslot, with very little advertising, and met with poor viewing figures. It built up a significant internet following, leading Channel 4 to repeat the series and produce a DVD release. In 2005, Channel 4's Film4 asked Holness and Ayoade to write a script for a film adaptation, but the project never saw further development.

The show was later broadcast in the United States on the Sci-Fi Channel and Adult Swim. The series has developed a cult fanbase over the years, and is now available to stream on multiple platforms.

== Show overview ==
"I'm Garth Marenghi: author, dreamweaver, visionary, plus actor: You are about to enter the world of my imagination; you are now entering my Darkplace."

— Garth Marenghi's opening narration.

The spoof comedy series, released in 2004, lampoons 1980s television drama, particularly horror, sci-fi, and "the rampant egotism of self-appointed 'mastermind' authors". The show presents Garth Marenghi's Darkplace as though it were a real, low-budget television series produced in the 1980s and is now getting its first screening, framed as part of a director's commentary series. Darkplace's fictional show-within-a-show includes deliberately poor production and special effects, sub-par acting, choppy editing and storylines that are "severely flawed and open-ended". This is interspersed with present-day interviews with the cast.

The series' fictional premise is that some time in the 1980s, bestselling horror author Garth Marenghi and his publisher/publicist, Dean Learner, made their own low-budget television series with a single intent: "to change the evolutionary course of Man over a series of half-hour episodes." Set in Darkplace Hospital, "over the very gates of Hell", in Romford, London, Garth Marenghi's Darkplace shows the adventures of Dr. Rick Dagless, M.D., as he fights the forces of darkness while simultaneously coping with the pressures of "day-to-day admin". Within this fictional context, Marenghi wrote 63 teleplays from which 50 shows were produced (in the commentary, he mentions that there were 67 episodes at one point, though it may have been intentional by Holness to show discontinuity); however, Channel 4 was eventually forced to reject the show due to its "radicality", though Marenghi also cites possible government suppression: "MI8, which is actually three levels above MI6, pulled the plug. And they did it because I knew the truth." In 2004, due to the "worst artistic drought in broadcast history", Channel 4 decided to air six of the original episodes.

The makers of Darkplace endeavoured to make the show seem authentic. From "the retro Channel 4 logo at the start to the distortion of the analogue music track at the start of scenes", "the fashion, ... the texture of film stock", "[the] deliberately poor continuity, cheesy lines, wooden acting and cheap special effects"; it is delivered "in such a pitch perfect way you can't help but laugh". Also included are "present-day interviews", in which Marenghi, Learner, and their co-star Todd Rivers comment on the show-within-the-show. The interview segments further reveal the delusional and self-absorbed attitudes of Marenghi and Learner.

As with promotion for their earlier Perrier Award-winning stage show, the official website speaks of Garth Marenghi, and other characters as though they were real people, while making no mention of the real actors. Press releases also contained "realistic looking fake back stories for Marenghi and the other characters instead of making any mention of what the real cast have appeared in", and an article by "Garth Marenghi" appeared in The Daily Telegraph discussing his "groundbreaking television series". "More than a few" people and media outlets were caught out by this fictional framing.

The show's musical soundtrack, ostensibly composed by "Stig Baasvik" (but with a further credit stating that it is "based on melodies whistled by Garth Marenghi") parodies the same subjects as the writing, and gained its actual composer, Andrew Hewitt, a BAFTA Nomination as Best New Composer for Film and T.V. (2004).

== Characters ==
- Matthew Holness as Garth Marenghi, "author, dream weaver, visionary, plus actor", who plays Dr Rick Dagless, M.D.: 'Dag' is a Vietnam and Falklands War veteran and former warlock.
- Richard Ayoade as Dean Learner, Garth's publisher, who plays Thornton Reed, a hospital administrator who bears a trademark shotgun and answers to unseen hospital boss "Won Ton".
- Matt Berry as Todd Rivers, an actor who plays Dr Lucien Sanchez: Improbably handsome with the disconcerting habit of losing lip-synch, "impossibly coiffured hair", and a voice an octave lower than it should be. He generally uses a semi-automatic pistol (with a backup in a leg holster in case his original turns on him).
- Alice Lowe as Madeleine Wool, an actress who plays Dr Liz Asher: a stereotypical fluffy blonde with occasional psychic powers (sometimes exacerbated by heightened emotion).
- Kim Noble as Jim, a hospital worker whose main function is to listen to Dagless reel off a lengthy speech and respond with a "yes" or other monosyllabic reply.
- Stuart Silver appears as "The Extra": a character whose name is unknown and has been a doctor, receptionist, keyboard soloist and barman.
- Julian Barratt as the hospital's vicar, whom Dagless refers to as "Padre".
- Graham Linehan as Darkplace's porter.
- Stephen Merchant as Darkplace's chef.

Noel Fielding appears as a mutant "Ape-oid" in Episode 4, "The Apes of Wrath".

== Episodes ==
This list is ordered by the original air dates on Channel 4 in the United Kingdom.

No.	Title	Original release date
1	"Once Upon a Beginning"	29 January 2004
When new doctor Liz Asher arrives at Darkplace Hospital, her psychic abilities let her have a vision of something terrible happening connected to hospital room 213. Dr. Rick Dagless, M.D., explains to her and his colleague Dr. Lucien Sanchez that this room's patient is Larry Renwick, a former colleague of Dagless's at Darkplace, who once performed an occult ritual with Dagless to "open the gates of hell" in the canteen and went mad during the ritual. Dagless was able to close the gates again. When he returns to room 213, he sees Renwick violently explode and mercy kills what is left of him, but fears that his explosion may have led to the gates to hell reopening. During Renwick's funeral, he comes back to life and attacks the mourners, before being shot and incinerated by Dagless. After being thanked for saving the other's lives, Dagless muses that from now on, Darkplace hospital may suffer from further occult occurrences. Guest starring Julian Barratt.
2	"Hell Hath Fury"	5 February 2004
While the staff is waiting for lunch, Dr. Asher introduces the new Temp Clive to Dr. Dagless. When Dr. Asher is angry about the delay of the chicken, the cook insults her in front of everyone. A short while later, he is attacked with a fork. When staff is looking for the perpertrator, Dagless, Sanchez and Clive are sent to the basement, while hospital administrator Thornton Reed stays with Asher, thoughlessly insulting her. In the basement, Dagless notices flying objects. He informs Reed that someone is performing telekinesis and that the reason for that is usually anger. When Reed continues to insult Asher, the whole hospital is attacked by flying objects and Reed realizes that Asher is the source of the attacks. Sanchez is overwhelmed by the objects while Dagless manages to reach Asher. She attacks him with a fire extinguisher, but Clive arrives in time and charges her. This gives Dagless the time to knock her out and bring her out of her trance, ending the attacks. But Clive, having been stabbed my multiple screwdrivers, dies in Dagless's arm, who cries out in pain. After Sanchez performs a lobotomy on Asher, extracting her "psycho-kinetic ability", the danger is averted. Guest starring Stephen Merchant.
3	"Skipper the Eyechild"	12 February 2004
One of Darkplace's patients had been mutated into a giant eye with an enormous penis because during experimental gamma ray treatment, "the eyeball of a sex offender got in the reactor chamber with him". This patient is raping another male patient when Dagless enters the room. Dagless shoots the eye dead but the other patient had already been impregnated and immediately gives birth to a creature which also is just a large eye and mouth. Dagless, who is still grieving for his own half-human, half-grasshopper son who died in a tragic accident involving a hop and helicopter blades, develops paternal feelings for the eye creature, and calls him Skipper. He tries to hide Skipper from hospital staff, who fear that he could be dangerous. After a chase through the hospital and several fistfights, both are eventually caught. When Dagless is allowed to say a final farewell to Skipper, he bites his fingers. In a fit of rage, Dagless brutally kills Skipper by repeatedly smashing him into the surroundings. When he realizes what he has done, he breaks down. His colleagues try to comfort him and the episode ends with Dagless reminiscing about his own son. Guest starring Graham Linehan.
4	"The Apes of Wrath"	19 February 2004
Everyone in the hospital who drinks the strangely green-looking water there regresses to an earlier genetic state, e.g. neanderthals and then homo erectus, who, according to Dagless, are known for their meanness. When Sanchez is overcome by the disease, he knocks out Dagless who falls in a coma for a month. When he wakes up again, the hospital has been taken over by the apes, with only Dagless and Reed, who only drink coffee, unaffected. Dagless finally realizes that it is the water which causes the transformation and goes searching for the source. He finds it in the water storage room: an "apealoid" who uses his own green urine to replace the hospital's water supply. Dagless tries to apprehend the creature, which leads him on a long chase. Dagless is finally able to catch the creature, which dies. After Dagless is able to create an antidote which reverses the effects on all hospital staff, he explains to the others that the creature once was a scientist specializing in human evolution, who found a serum which could turn humans into apes and used it for his "malevolent schemes". Guest starring Julian Barratt and Noel Fielding.
5	"Scotch Mist"	26 February 2004
A mist starts to envelop the hospital. When a nurse and a patient leave the hospital for a tete-a-tete, they are attacked and killed in the mist. When Dagless examines their bodies, he notices that their faces are painted in a pattern and that there is porridge nearby. He and Asher explain that the phenomen is "Scotch Mist: an evil Highland force - the ghosts of Scottish Warriors trapped in foggy mist". When Asher's psychic vision shows that Jim, one of their colleagues, is in danger, Dagless, Asher, and Sanchez go into the mist to save him. They find him wounded and are then attacked by Scottish warriors. After fleeing, Dagless explains that he believes he is the reason for the mist: when he once had to stay one night in Glasgow, he was so revolted by what he experienced that he insulted many people, saying many racist things. The warriors are now out to kill him. Dagless decides to confront the warriors and with some shortbread given to him by Reed and a heartfelt apology, he is able to get the warriors to forgive him and leave the hospital alone. Guest starring Paul King.
6	"The Creeping Moss from the Shores of Shuggoth"	4 March 2004
When patient Linda is exposed to a green gas coming from an air vent, she turns green and her fingers turn into broccoli. When Sanchez sees Linda for the first time, he instantly falls in love with her. After noticing that a green gas cloud had been hovering over the hospital and analyzing Linda's tissue samples, Dagless concludes that the green gas contained cosmic fungi, whose spores have infected Linda, turning her, and everyone who comes into sexual contact with her, into broccoli, eventually killing them. After having sex with her, Sanchez is also infected. Dagless struggles with the question whether to tell Sanchez that Linda is dying, that he will have to boil her body to stop the infection and that he will have to amputate Sanchez's penis to save him. When he decides to tell Sanchez about Linda and that he will have to ask for Reed's assistance for Sanchez's penectomy, Sanchez initiates a fight but is finally subdued and operated on. Linda dies with Dagless by her side and hands him a dreamcatcher as a gift for Sanchez. After the cloud recedes, Sanchez thanks Dagless for saving his life and asks him to keep the dreamcatcher. Guest starring Julian Barratt and Graham Linehan.

== Reception ==
Rotten Tomatoes gives the series an 87% rating based on reviews from 23 critics, with an average rating of 6.7/10. The site's critical consensus reads, "The short-lived Garth Marenghi's Darkplace is strangely brilliant, even while buried under its own layers of satire."

== Broadcasts ==
Darkplace originally aired in 2004. Only one series was produced. There is media speculation that the "average" or "poor" viewing figures led Channel 4 to decide against commissioning a second series. Channel 4 started a re-run of the series in October 2006 and released the show on DVD in the same month, while allowing the show to be re-broadcast on Virgin Media's On-demand service. In 2005, it was reported that the channel's cinema division, Film Four, had asked Holness and Ayoade to write a script for a film version of their programme.

On 27 July 2006, Darkplace made its U.S. debut on the Sci-Fi Channel.

The series had a spin-off, the spoof chat show Man to Man with Dean Learner, which began on 20 October 2006 on Channel 4. Dean's first guest was Garth Marenghi. During the interview with Garth a clip from the supposedly forthcoming movie, War of the Wasps, is shown, again featuring Dean Learner and his acting ability. Marenghi would also appear on the final episode of the series, which featured a clip from a video nasty that Garth and Dean had supposedly produced, which featured cameos from various Darkplace cast members.

As of 2022 Darkplace is available to watch on All 4 (Channel 4's free streaming service) and BritBox, and was screened on UK Gold in January 2016. In the United States it is available on Amazon Prime and Pluto TV.

== Home media ==
The complete series was released on DVD (PAL, region 2 only) on 16 October 2006, including the following special features:

- Commentaries on all episodes in which the cast stay in character as Garth, Dean and Todd (Lowe is absent as Madeleine Wool was established in the series as being presumed dead for decades)
- A deleted scene and test footage (both staged deliberately for DVD purposes)
- Original "One Track Lover" single (extended version), along with the Darkplace theme and three "Darkplace Moodscapes" by composer Stig Baasvik (in reality the composer is BAFTA award-winning Andrew Hewitt)
- Over an hour of extra talking heads
- Photograph galleries (staged deliberately for DVD purposes)
- Original radio ads
- Original storyboards and storyboard-to-scene comparisons
- An "easter egg" (containing bonus footage) accessible by selecting, and then fast-forwarding, the "Colour Bars" feature in the set-up menu
- An easter egg of the entire television soundtrack; this can be accessed by either clicking on the picture of Liz Asher in the setting menu (this method works only if you are watching the DVD on a PC), or selecting One Track Lover to listen to and pressing "previous", or by using your DVD player's "Go to Title" feature and then entering the title number 19. The soundtrack is approximately thirty-eight minutes, and is divided into twenty-four chapters.

The cover of the DVD also features a play on the DVD logo, which instead reads "DEANVD".

Holness and Ayoade reprise their roles as Garth and Dean in Man to Man with Dean Learner, which is also available on DVD.
