= Garth Marenghi's Fright Knight =

British stage play

Garth Marenghi's Fright Knight was a low-budget horror parody stage show written by Richard Ayoade and Matthew Holness, and starring Holness, Ayoade, and Alice Lowe. The show, which spoofed Stephen King, was performed at the 2000 Edinburgh Festival Fringe where it was nominated for the Perrier Award.

The show was built around Holness's spoof horror writer character Garth Marenghi, with additional parts played by Ayoade (as Marenghi's publisher Dean Learner) and Lowe. The show led to Holness and Ayoade being signed by Avalon Entertainment.

The sequel to Fright Knight, Garth Marenghi's Netherhead, won the Perrier Award in 2001. The play's characters subsequently appeared in the Channel 4 miniseries, Garth Marenghi's Darkplace.

== Critical reception ==
Lyn Gardner of The Guardian described it as "a very slick and very funny spoof". Chortle.com described it as "a splendidly over-the-top spoof gorefest, getting plenty of laughs from hammy overacting, ridiculous plots and laboriously melodramatic lines".
