= A Gun for George =

- Video cover
- Directed by: Matthew Holness
- Written by: Matthew Holness
- Produced by: Peter Carlton; Ally Gipps
- Starring: Matthew Holness
- Cinematography: David Rom
- Edited by: Nick Fenton
- Music by: Alan Hawkshaw; Ron Geesin; Guido & Maurizio De Angelis
- Distributed by: Warp Films and Film4
- Release date: 18 May 2011
- Running time: 17 minutes
- Country: United Kingdom
- Language: English

A Gun for George is a 2011 short film written, directed by and starring Matthew Holness. It centres on Terry Finch (Holness), a down on his luck pulp-fiction crime writer who is angry at the world and haunted by the murder of his brother George by local gangsters. Finch is the author of a series of violent novelettes featuring Bob Shuter, aka 'The Reprisalizer', an urban vigilante who preys upon the criminals of east Kent.

The title of the film refers to Finch's brother and also to the name he gave to the Austin Allegro that Terry inherited from him. Finch frequently refers to features of the Austin Allegro such as the "quartic" steering wheel and its hydragas suspension system.

A Gun for George was produced by Warp Films and Film4.
