= Ed Gamble's Unacceptable! =

British TV comedy panel show (2026–present)

- Genre: Comedy; Panel game; Unscripted
- Created by: Lauren Jupp
- Directed by: Barbara Wiltshire
- Presented by: Ed Gamble
- Starring: Joanne McNally; Richard Ayoade
- Country of origin: United Kingdom
- Original language: English
- No. of seasons: 2
- No. of episodes: 8

Production
- Producers: Sheeren Docherty; Benjamin Green; Romesh Ranganathan
- Running time: 45 minutes
- Production company: Ranga Bee Productions

Original release
- Network: TLC
- Release: 5 July 2026 – present

Ed Gamble's Unacceptable!, previously named Unacceptable!, is a British comedy panel show aired on TLC, and made by Ranga Bee Productions. Hosted by Ed Gamble and featuring team captains Richard Ayoade and Joanne McNally, the show features several comedians defending intentionally absurd and provocative claims, all of which they are forced to defend on the spot. It was first broadcast on 5 July 2026.

== History ==
Development producer at Ranga Bee Productions Lauren Jupp came up with the original concept for the show, and continued to develop the format throughout production. On 5 March 2026, the show was ordered by Warner Brothers Discovery, and initial details were released, with the release date being confirmed as Summer 2026 on TLC, and comedian Ed Gamble hosting, and fellow comedians Joanne McNally and Richard Ayoade the team captains. Six hour-long episodes were confirmed for series 1. Gamble says he “loved the idea” when being approached by Romesh Ranganathan, who owns Ranga Bee Productions, to host the show. Production for both series took place at Garden Studios in London. On 22 May 2026, TLC confirmed the first episode would air on 5 July 2026, with a 9pm Sunday time slot, after the watershed. A few days before the first series aired, Warner Brothers Discovery ordered a second series, set to air in November that would feature eight hour-long episodes, including a Christmas special. Promotional material for series two featured an altered title for the show, adding the name of its host to become “Ed Gamble's Unnaceptable!”

== Format ==
For each episode, two celebrity comedians join each of the team captains. A contestant will be given a contrarian or odd opinion to read out, and then the audience will vote on if they think the opinion given is ‘unacceptable,' with the results being broadcast as a percentage on the 'swingometer.' The contestant given an opinion and their teammates must defend the opinion they're given, whilst their opponents must provide reasoning for opposing said opinion, all with comedic and tongue-in-cheek overtones. At the end of the round, the audience will vote again, and if the percentage of unacceptability has decreased, the defending team will earn a point, whereas if the percentage increases the attacking team earn a point.

=== Rounds ===
None of these rounds are explicitly named in the show. All rounds use the audience voting before and after the debate detailed above.

- In the first round, contestants will read out opinions they’ve prepared prior to the show.
- In another round, contestants will 'sabotage' the other team by writing opinions that they will have to read out and defend.
- In one round, two generally controversial celebrities, such as Elon Musk and Donald Trump, will be shown, and the audience will vote on which one is more unacceptable before and after the round. Each team will be allocated a celebrity to defend, and whichever team’s celebrity deemed less unacceptable by the audience after each side has argued their case will earn a point.
- Some rounds feature appearances from contestants family members, where they will either support or criticise their related contestants opinions.

Unseen bits have been released on YouTube, and series two will feature a Christmas special. A Best of episode is available on Sky and their streaming service Now.

== Cast and episodes ==
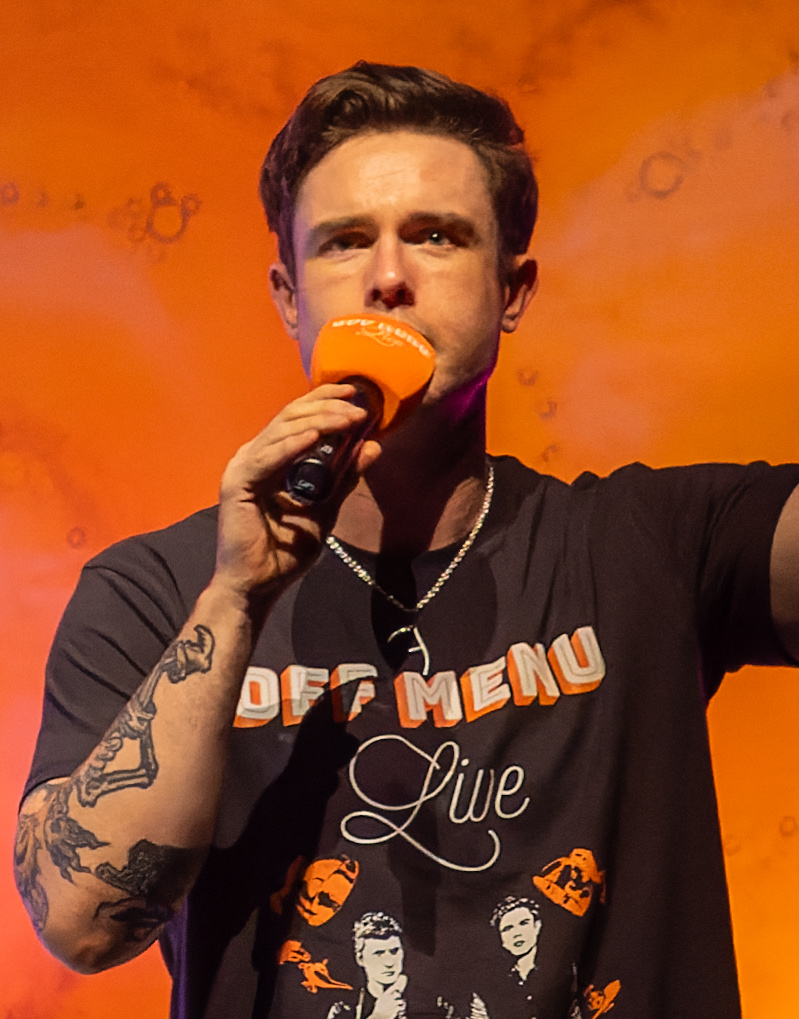
Ed Gamble hosts the show, and from the second series onward had his name added to the title

Joanne McNally is a team captain, and has appeared in every episode

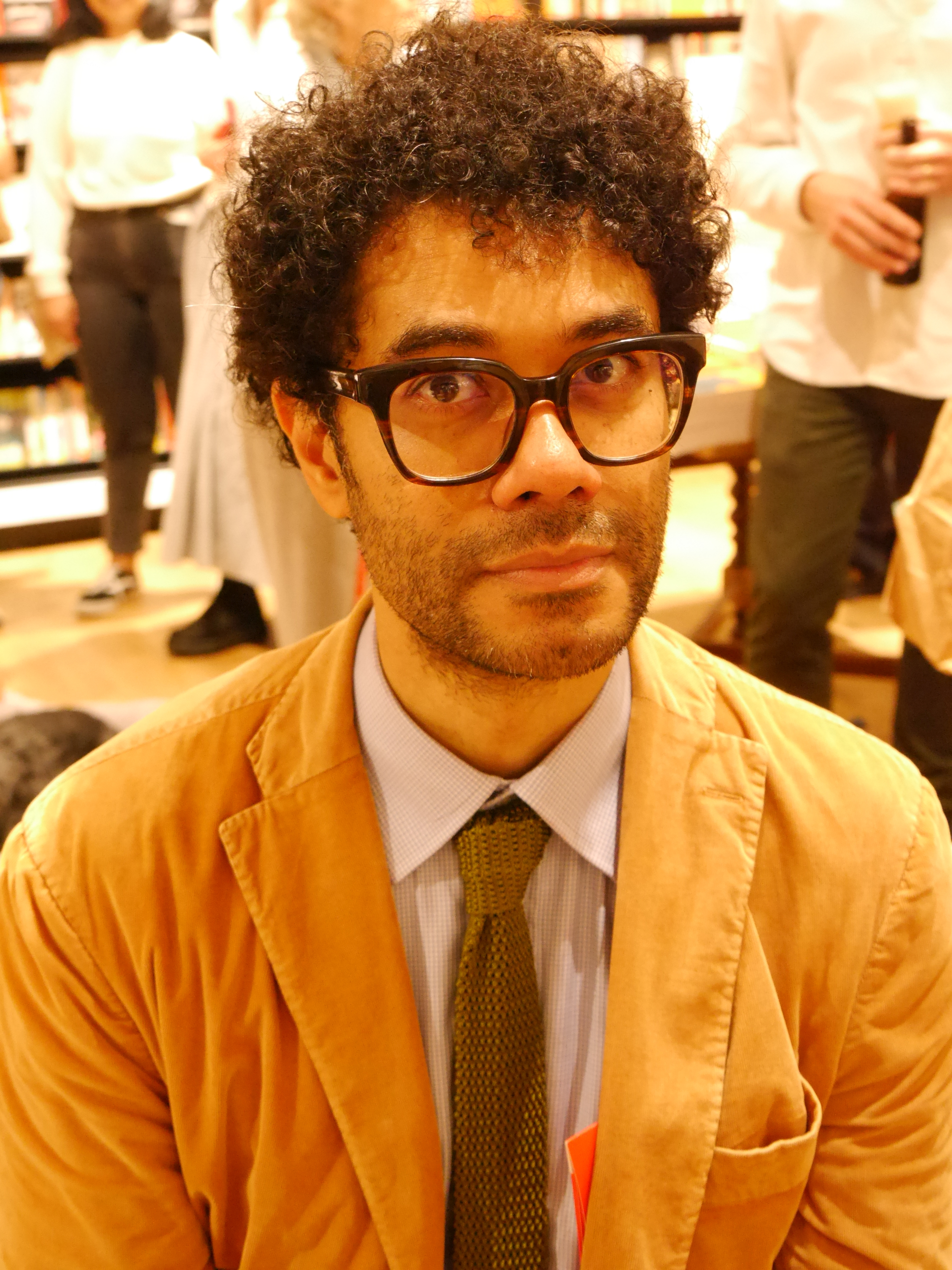
Richard Ayoade is the other team captain

=== Series 1 (Summer 2026) ===
| Episode | First broadcast | Joanne's team | Richard's team |
|---|---|---|---|
| 01x01 | 5 July 2026 | Romesh Ranganathan and Sophie Willan | Roisin Conaty and Katherine Ryan |
| 01x02 | 12 July 2026 | Guz Khan and Geoff Norcott | Maisie Adam and Chris McCausland |
| 01x03 | 19 July 2026 | Rhys James and Tom Davis | Harriet Kemsley and Suzi Ruffell |
| 01x04 | 26 July 2026 | Lucy Beaumont and Joel Dommett | Ivo Graham and Jessica Knappett |
| 01x05 | 2 August 2026 | Fatiha El-Ghorri and Katherine Ryan | Vittorio Angelone and Catherine Bohart |
| 01x06 | 9 August 2026 | Lou Sanders and Kiell Smith-Bynoe | Alex Brooker and Sarah Keyworth |

=== Series 2 (Winter 2026) ===
| Episode | First broadcast | Joanne's team | Richard's team |
|---|---|---|---|
| 02x01 | 8 November 2026 | Catherine Bohart and Harriet Kemsley | Dara O'Briain and Phil Wang |

== Reception ==
The show has received generally unfavourable reviews from critics. Hannah Davis of The Guardian felt the show was entirely unnecessary and failed to provide anything that couldn't be found in other panel shows, leading her to believe the show would not be a household name in 20 years. She also felt many of the opinions expressed by the comedians were forced, picking out “lefty comedian” Romesh Ranganathan for claiming the royals should get a pay rise. Heidi Lewis mirrored these views, and felt the show was entirely unnecessary. Christopher Stephens from the Daily Mail heavily criticised the show's “mish-mash” editing, complaining that references from Ed Gamble to cut sections were left in, and that the show was in a somewhat random order, whilst similarly to Davis also expressed concern that the show failed to distinguish itself from other panel shows. James Jackson of The Times was less critical of the show, praising it for its edgy humour whilst acknowledging the absurdity of what was said, alongside the interesting concept which reminded him of Call My Bluff, though he felt the show may struggle to find and audience and suffered from a lack of identity.
