= Dark Encounter =

- Directed by: Carl Strathie
- Written by: Carl Strathie
- Produced by: Carl Strathie; Alan Latham; Charlette Kilby
- Cinematography: Bart Sienkiewicz
- Edited by: Chris Timson
- Music by: David Stone Hamilton
- Release date: 23 August 2019
- Running time: 97 minutes
- Language: English

Dark Encounter is a 2019 science fiction mystery thriller, written and directed by Carl Strathie, in which a terrorising alien encounter reveals the dark truth behind a child disappearance in rural Pennsylvania.

== Plot ==
In November 1982, married couple Ray and Olivia return to their small town home, to find that their eight-year-old daughter, Maisie, has disappeared without a trace.

One year later, after a memorial service, the family arrives at Ray and Olivia's house. In addition to the two of them and their son Noah, Ray's brother Billy, Olivia's sister Arlene and her husband Kenneth, the sheriff of a neighboring parish, and Olivia's widowed brother Morgan join for dinner. The group attempts to have dinner, but Ray begins an argument with his brother Billy. Later, Ray and Morgan have a short conversation about grieving: Morgan offers his advice, but Ray makes it clear he has no intention of moving on, and storms out of the kitchen.

A strange play of light begins in the forest, which Ray looks at with concern. He suspects that local children are using flares, and sets out to confront them in the forest. Morgan, Billy, Sheriff Kenneth and his son Noah join him. They drive into the forest, and witness strange phenomena: electricity goes haywire, both on their flashlights and on the car, an inexplicable light crosses the forest, and Morgan disappears without a trace. At the same time, Sheriff Kenneth experiences something that renders him catatonic, and the party reunites in the car, with Morgan still missing. Olivia and Arlene, who remained in the house, are startled by rumbling noises.

After the men return, the house experiences further disturbing phenomena. The lights flicker erratically, electrical devices turn on by themselves, an invisible force attracts metal objects and a figure sneaks around the house and tries to enter. Drawn by the glaring light, Ray, Kenneth and Arlene disappear one after the other. Billy, Olivia and Noah flee from the property to the nearest country road, where they witness a light show in the night sky; it is now clear that the events are due to extraterrestrial beings. The trio is picked up by the local sheriff and another policeman and driven back to the house. Neither of the three reveals what had actually happened, and just declare that they were tormented by some unknown trio. At their own request, the three stay behind in the house and barricade themselves in the bedroom of the missing daughter, and the police officers go back to town. At the police station, a crowd is waiting to give statements regarding similar events; a police woman describes similar occurrences to the sheriff.

Back in the house, an alien enters the bedroom and touches Olivia's forehead. She finds herself in a copy of the house, where she can see past events through the windows: the scenes that led to the disappearance of her daughter Maisie a year earlier take place. While Ray and Olivia were in town, she sees how Sheriff Kenneth visited Maisie and took advantage of her parents' absence to rape her. He then killed the girl and buried her in the forest where the light shows began a year later. As the truth unfolds, the walls of the house begin to crack.

Olivia wakes up and finds herself laying in Maisie's bed, while she processes what she just learned.

Her son calls her from across the room and they embrace. All of the people who had previously disappeared slowly reappear in the house, with a nosebleed and evident shock. They were all shown, like Olivia was, what had happened a year ago, and Kenneth's horrendous crime is now known to them all. As they go down the stairs, they find Kenneth, and Arlene attacks him. Moments later, the sheriff arrives, while Olivia asks Kenneth where Maisie's body is.

The sheriff organises a search party that finally finds Maisie's body, and the family holds a second funeral. He is then interviewed on TV about the events that unfolded, and the alien's aid in finding Maisie. The last scene shows Ray and Olivia in bed, as they begin to process what has happened and find inner peace.

== Production ==
Dark Encounter is the second feature film from director Carl Strathie, who shot the science fiction thriller Solis in 2018. Cinematographer Bart Sienkiewicz, editor Chris Timson and composer David Stone Hamilton worked on both films. Actor Sid Phoenix provided voiceover work as the character Milton for the earlier film, as well as playing Billy in Dark Encounter. Strathie is self-taught and never attended film school, but made various short films before Solis.

Dark Encounter is set in rural Pennsylvania, although for budget reasons the film was shot entirely in Yorkshire. Interior shoots took place in the GSP Studios near Selby in North Yorkshire. The shooting took place in early 2018.

The film premiered on 23 August 2019 at the British film festival FrightFest.

== Cast ==
- Mel Raido as Ray
- Laura Fraser as Olivia
- Spike White as Noah
- Sid Phoenix as Billy
- Alice Lowe as Arlene
- Grant Masters as Kenneth
- Vincent Regan as Morgan
- Nicholas Pinnock as Sheriff Jordan
- Sean Knopp as Deputy Miles
