= Joanne McNally =

Irish comedian and actress (born 1983)

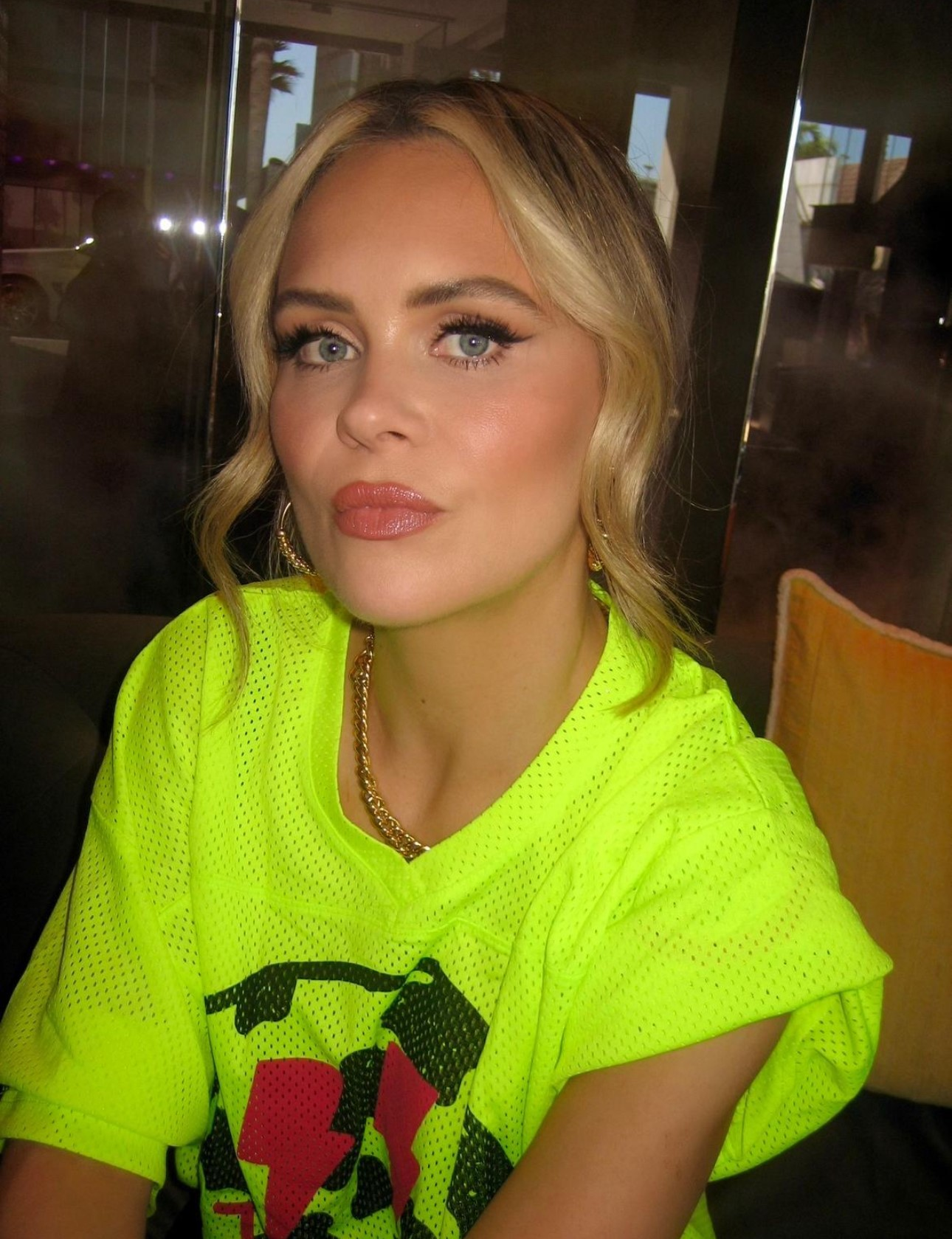
- McNally in 2024
- Born: 7 May 1983 (age 43); County Roscommon, Ireland
- Occupations: Stand-up comedian, writer, actress
- Years active: 2013–present

Joanne McNally (born 7 May 1983) is an Irish stand-up comedian, writer, and actress. McNally was the co-host of Republic of Telly for RTÉ and has also appeared on The Late Late Show, The Afternoon Show, Ireland AM, Two Tube, and The Commute for RTÉ. As well as segments on RTÉ 2fm, McNally co-hosts a podcast called My Therapist Ghosted Me with Vogue Williams.

== Early life ==
McNally was born in County Roscommon; her biological father left her mother before Joanne's birth. McNally was raised by her adoptive family in Killiney, County Dublin.

== Early career ==
McNally was a publicist in her early twenties and worked alongside the influencer James Kavanagh. She had originally intended to go into journalism as she had studied English and sociology for her undergraduate degree at University College Dublin and had looked at studying an MA in journalism noting that "someone was like, 'You need to fucking be prepared to sell your granny for a story.' I was like, 'Well, my granny's dead! I've nothing to sell!' So I ended up going into PR."

She also spent a year in Australia.

Having enjoyed her time as a publicist, the work had left her stressed and unfulfilled and so she pivoted to a role in the charity sector, at a mental health charity. During this period she was dealing with bulimia and would sleep in the charity's office as she couldn't go back to her housemates.

== Stand-up career ==
=== Stand-up ===
In 2014, after McNally had received treatment for bulimia and anorexia, director Una McKevitt invited her to perform in her new show, Singlehood, which was about a mixture of seven people discussing their love lives. At the time, McNally was unemployed but agreed to do the stageshow.

She performed in Singlehood with comedian PJ Gallagher who suggested to McNally and McKevitt that they should work on a new project together, which became Separated at Birth about their adoptions. Separated at Birth sold out Vicar Street in May 2015 and went on a national tour around Ireland. The two were guests on The Late Late Show hosted by Ryan Tubridy on RTÉ One in March 2015.

McNally supported Gallagher on his stand up tour Concussion, around Ireland in 2015, and she was then signed by Irish comedy agency Lisa Richards.

She reunited with McKevitt to write a one-woman show about her bulimia, called Bite Me. She co-wrote and performed her one-woman show for the Dublin Fringe Festival, directed by Una McKevitt. The show is a dark comedy based on her experience with eating disorders. The show sold out its five night run in Dublin's Project Arts Centre and was nominated for four awards including Best Performance, Best Production and the First Fortnight Award. An excerpt from the show was re-printed in The Irish Times. She appeared as a guest on RTÉ One's The Tommy Tiernan Show in January 2017 where she talked about the show. McNally performed Bite Me at the Edinburgh Festival Fringe in Assembly Rooms in Scotland August 2017.

She performed her show Wine Tamer with success at the Edinburgh Fringe Festival, and later also at the Adelaide Fringe Festival.

She started touring her show Prosecco Express in 2022, in UK and Ireland. which included multiple sold out dates at Vicar Street in Dublin and the London Palladium.

Her tour Pinotphile began in 2025, going across cities in UK and Ireland including Dublin, London and Manchester. Joanne is set to bring Pinotphile to Dublin's 3Arena in 2026, making her the first Irish female comedian to host a solo show on that iconic stage.

=== Television ===
McNally was cast as the new co-host of RTÉ2 satirical comedy sketch TV show Republic of Telly in October 2015, replacing Jennifer Maguire who left to star in the Irish comedy Bridget & Eamon with Bernard O'Shea. McNally quit the comedy show in June 2016.

McNally was a semi finalist in So You Think You're Funny and Funny Women. She has performed at comedy festivals Vodafone Comedy Festival, Cat Laughs, Galway Comedy Carnival, Body & Soul Festival, Jestfest and Bray Comedy Festival.

In April 2022, she appeared in Channel 4's The Big Fat Quiz of Everything and then in 2026 she appeared in Channel 4's The Big Fat Quiz of Telly.

In September 2023, McNally co-presented Joanne & Vogue’s Sex Drive with Vogue Williams; a one-off special shown on E4.

McNally was a contestant on the seventeenth series of the Channel 4 show Taskmaster which premiered in March 2024. She finished in second place.

McNally appeared on the second series of The Celebrity Traitors in October 2026.

From summer 2026, McNally has been a team captain in Ed Gamble’s Unacceptable on TLC alongside Richard Ayoade.

In October 2026, she appeared with Bill Murray in one episode of A Course Called Ireland (Episode 4: "Into the Fourth Quarter").

=== Podcasts ===
McNally co-hosts the award winning podcast My Therapist Ghosted Me with Vogue Williams since April 2021.

Her company, Prosecco Pig Ltd which produces the podcast posted a post-tax profit of €674,823 in 2025.

McNally hosts the Joanne McNally Investigates for BBC Sounds which has had two series, the first was 'Who Replaced Avril Lavigne?" and the second series was 'Did the Furbys Spy on Us?'

Miranda Sawyer of the Guardian reviewed the first series of the podcast: "Initially, I found the constant diversions a little trying, but that’s because I thought this was an investigative show. It’s not. It’s a comedy one." Hollie Richardson also of the Guardian differed: "She’s not even a Lavigne fan, which only adds to the hilarity of her Stacey Dooley-like ambitions." Fiona McCann host of the We Can’t Print This podcast and frequent contributor to the Irish Times said of the podcast: "Who replaced Avril Lavigne? Who cares? It’s McNally, whose bawdy, brazen brand of genuine pulls the listener through a shaky premise on thin scaffolding with the sheer force of her personality, who turns out to be irreplaceable."

=== Writing ===
McNally writes a monthly column for Stellar magazine called "Jo's World". Her book of essays, Femme Feral, is scheduled to be published in August 2026.

== Personal life ==
McNally is currently single and uses dating apps. Her personal life also features in her comedy stand-up.
