= Solis (film) =

- Theatrical release poster
- Directed by: Carl Strathie
- Written by: Carl Strathie
- Produced by: Charlette Kilby; Alan Latham; Carl Strathie; Steven Ogg; Caleb Wilson
- Starring: Steven Ogg; Alice Lowe
- Cinematography: Bart Sienkiewicz
- Edited by: Chris Timson
- Music by: David Stone Hamilton
- Production companies: Premiere Picture; Strathie Film
- Distributed by: Blue Fox Entertainment
- Release date: October 26, 2018
- Running time: 92 minutes
- Language: English

Solis is a 2018 sci-fi survival film written and directed by Carl Strathie, and starring Steven Ogg; featured in supporting voice roles are Alice Lowe, Sid Phoenix, Henry Douthwaite, Kate Coogan and Charlette Kilby.

The film was released in the United States on October 26, 2018.

== Plot ==
Troy Holloway (Ogg), Milton and Lieutenant Harris are astronauts for the Orbis Mining Corporation on Aten 2024 DEC. After a space mining accident, Milton and Lieutenant Harris are killed. Holloway, a prospector and engineering technician, evacuates aboard the EEV Khapera 2 with Milton's corpse. Holloway, the lone survivor of the three, awakens and establishes contact with Commander Roberts, the new pilot of Hathor 18. The EEV beacon is down and Holloway is unable to inform Hathor 18 of his coordinates. Roberts attempts to triangulate the position of the EEV using the PLB.

Roberts questions Holloway as to the extent of his medical injuries, which include a concussion. Shortly after, Roberts triangulates the beacon of the EEV and discovers Holloway's position. She informs him that the EEV's departure from DEC has set him on course for the Sun, a fact which Holloway had already assumed with the Sun visible from the EEVs window.

Holloway is informed of the many damaged parts of the EEV including temperature control issues and a radiation leak. As Roberts attempts a rescue with Hathor 18, Holloway makes repairs, sustaining multiple injuries in the process. The window of the EEV begins to crack and Holloway soon begins to lose hope. He urges Roberts to turn back and avoid an attempt to rescue him in order to save her life and the life of her fellow crew members. She informs him that she has strict orders from Control to rescue at least one member of Aten 2024 DEC.

As the EEV is propelled closer and closer to the Sun, Holloway continues making repairs, including one on the outside of the ship. As his oxygen levels decrease and he drifts closer to losing consciousness, he once again urges Roberts to turn back due to the risk of both vessels from the Sun, but she refuses to give up on him and tells him not to give up. Holloway informs Roberts that he will be coming through the window of the EEV and tells her to pull in front of him. She does so just as his air levels deplete. He says aloud that he is going home and readies himself as the window shatters.

== Cast ==
- Steven Ogg as Troy Holloway
- Alice Lowe (voice) as Commander Roberts
- Sid Phoenix (voice) as Milton
- Henry Douthwaite (voice) as Lieutenant Harris
- Kate Coogan (voice) as Liz Holloway
- Charlette Kilby (voice) as Ship / Suit Voice

== Production ==
Principal photography on the film began on December 1, 2016 at GSP Studios in Yorkshire.

Solis is the first feature film by Carl Strathie, followed in 2019 by Dark Encounter, another sci-fi created in Yorkshire.

== Release ==
The film was released in the United States on October 26, 2018, by Blue Fox Entertainment. It was later released on DVD on December 11, 2018.

=== Critical response ===
On Rotten Tomatoes, the film holds an approval rating of 0% based on six reviews, with an average rating of 4.6/10.
