= Richard Ayoade =

British comedian and actor (born 1977)

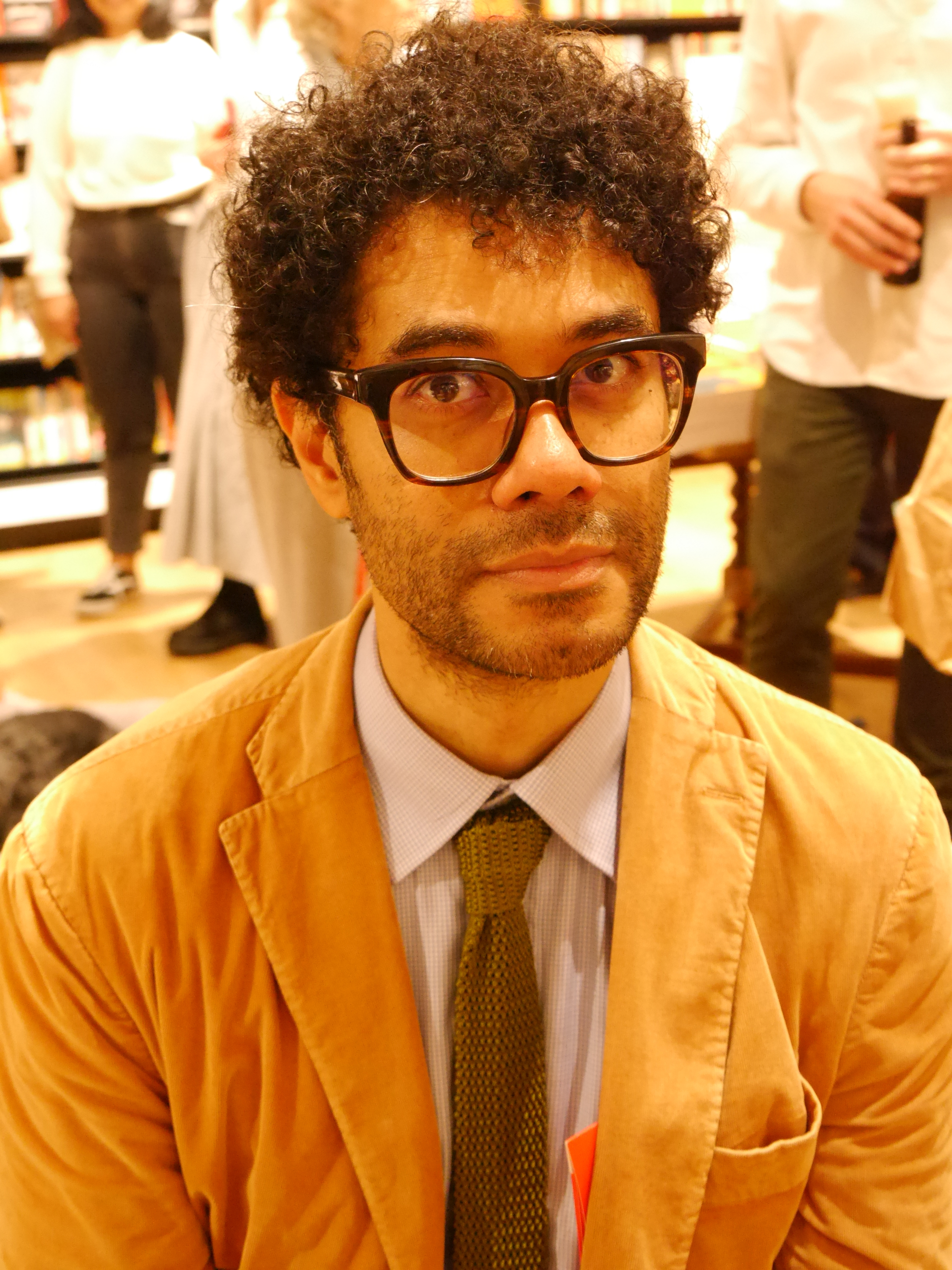
- Ayoade at Waterstones, London in 2024
- Born: 23 May 1977 (age 49); Hammersmith, London, England
- Education: St Catharine's College, Cambridge (BA)
- Occupations: Comedian; actor; writer; director; presenter
- Years active: 2000–present
- Spouse: Lydia Fox (m. 2007)
- Children: 2
- Family: Fox family (by marriage)

Richard Ayoade (/ˌaɪoʊˈɑːdi/ EYE-oh-AH-dee; born 23 May 1977) is a British comedian, actor, writer, director, and presenter. He played the role of socially awkward IT technician Maurice Moss in Channel 4 sitcom The IT Crowd (2006–2013), for which he won the 2014 BAFTA for Best Male Comedy Performance.

Ayoade was president of the Footlights club whilst a student at the University of Cambridge. He and Matthew Holness debuted their respective characters Dean Learner and Garth Marenghi at the Edinburgh Festival Fringe in 2000, bringing the characters to television with Garth Marenghi's Darkplace (2004) and Man to Man with Dean Learner (2006). He appeared in the comedy shows The Mighty Boosh (2004–2007) and Nathan Barley (2005). After directing music videos for Kasabian, Arctic Monkeys, Vampire Weekend, and Yeah Yeah Yeahs, he wrote and directed the comedy-drama film Submarine (2010), an adaptation of the 2008 novel by Joe Dunthorne. He co-starred in the American science fiction comedy film The Watch (2012) and his second film, the black comedy The Double (2013), drew inspiration from Fyodor Dostoevsky's novella of the same title.

Ayoade has frequently appeared on panel shows, most prominently on The Big Fat Quiz of the Year, and served as a team captain on Was It Something I Said? (2013). He presented the factual shows Gadget Man (2013–2015), its spin-off Travel Man (2015–2019), and the revival of The Crystal Maze (2017–2020). He has also voiced characters in a number of animated projects, including the films The Boxtrolls (2014), Early Man (2018), The Lego Movie 2: The Second Part (2019), Soul (2020), The Bad Guys (2022) and its 2025 sequel, as well as the series Strange Hill High (2013–2014), Apple & Onion (2018–2021), Krapopolis (2023–present), and Dream Productions (2024).

Ayoade has written three comedic film-focused books: Ayoade on Ayoade: A Cinematic Odyssey (2014), The Grip of Film (2017), and Ayoade on Top (2019), as well as the children's book The Book That No One Wanted to Read (2022), illustrated by Tor Freeman.

== Early life ==
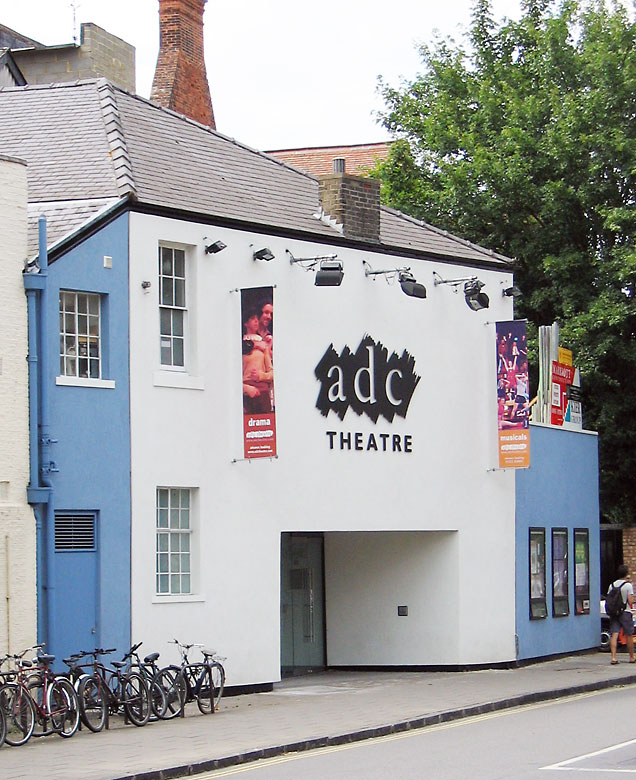
The ADC Theatre, home of Footlights

Ayoade was born on 23 May 1977 in Hammersmith, London, the son of a Norwegian mother and Nigerian father of Yoruba ethnicity. The family moved to Martlesham Heath, near Ipswich when he was young. At the age of 15, he developed an interest in film "beyond Star Wars and Back to the Future" and began exploring the works of directors Woody Allen, Ingmar Bergman, and Federico Fellini. He studied at the independent St Joseph's College in Ipswich, where he recalls being "obsessed" with J. D. Salinger's book The Catcher in the Rye. He was so obsessed with the book that he started to dress like its protagonist, Holden Caulfield.

From 1995 to 1998, Ayoade studied law at St Catharine's College, Cambridge, where he won the Martin Steele Prize for play production and was president of the amateur theatrical club Footlights. His Footlights contemporaries included comedians David Mitchell and John Oliver. He and Footlights vice-president Oliver wrote and performed in several productions together, appearing in both Footlights' 1997 and 1998 touring shows: Emotional Baggage (directed by Matthew Holness) and Between a Rock and a Hard Place (directed by Cal McCrystal). Ayoade says that his parents would not approve of studies considered to be of the "Regency era", adding that "a non-vocational degree seemed such an outlandish indulgence". He said that his degree in law was no longer a viable "fallback" for him and that he would need to "go back to square one".

== Career ==
=== 2000–2006: Garth Marenghi shows and The Mighty Boosh ===
Ayoade co-wrote the stage show Garth Marenghi's Fright Knight with Matthew Holness, whom he also met at the Footlights, appearing in the show with Holness at the Edinburgh Fringe in 2000 where it was nominated for a Perrier Award. The show saw the debut of Holness' character Garth Marenghi, a fictional horror writer, and Ayoade's character Dean Learner, Marenghi's publisher. In 2001, he won the Perrier Comedy Award for co-writing and performing in Garth Marenghi's Netherhead, the sequel to Fright Knight. In 2004, Ayoade and Holness took the Marenghi character to Channel 4, creating the spoof horror comedy series Garth Marenghi's Darkplace. Ayoade wrote, directed, and appeared in the series, which saw Marenghi and Learner star in a 1980s television drama that was never broadcast. Learner played Thornton Reed, a hospital administrator. Along with Matt Berry, Ayoade directed, co-wrote and co-starred in AD/BC: A Rock Opera, which parodies life-of-Christ rock operas and aired on BBC Three in December 2004. Ayoade was also a writer on the sketch show Bruiser in 2000, which starred former Footlights president David Mitchell and Robert Webb, and featured Holness. Ayoade was featured in a bit-part as a reporter in the HBO television film The Life and Death of Peter Sellers (2004).

After appearing in Julian Barratt and Noel Fielding's radio series The Boosh, Ayoade was part of the original cast of Barratt and Fielding's The Mighty Boosh television show. He was originally selected to play the role of dangerous villain Dixon Bainbridge. However, by the time the radio series transferred to television he was under contract by Channel 4 and was only able to act in the pilot before leaving The Boosh. The part was taken by fellow Darkplace actor and eventual IT Crowd co-star Matt Berry. He later returned in the second series in 2005, to play the part of the belligerent shaman Saboo. Ayoade continued his association with The Mighty Boosh in the third series, reprising his role and acting as script editor. In 2005, he played the role of Ned Smanks in Chris Morris' and Charlie Brooker's sitcom Nathan Barley. Ayoade's Dean Learner character was resurrected in 2006 to host a comedy chat show, Man to Man with Dean Learner, on Channel 4. The different guests were played each week by Holness. Ayoade appeared in the satirical comedy series Time Trumpet in 2006, which is set in the year 2031 and saw Ayoade and other celebrities reminiscing about the year 2007 onwards.

=== 2006–2010: The IT Crowd, music videos, and Submarine ===
In February 2006, Ayoade began playing technologically brilliant, but socially awkward, IT technician Maurice Moss in the sitcom The IT Crowd on Channel 4, appearing with Chris O'Dowd, Katherine Parkinson, Chris Morris, and later on, Matt Berry. The series' creator Graham Linehan wrote the part specifically for Ayoade. In 2008, Ayoade won the award for an outstanding actor in a television comedy series at the Monte-Carlo Television Festival for his performance. In 2009, Ayoade co-starred with Joel McHale in the pilot for an American version of The IT Crowd, reprising his role with the same appearance and personality; however, no series was commissioned, and the pilot never aired. The original The IT Crowd ran for four seasons until 2010, with a special airing in 2013, for which Ayoade won a BAFTA for Best Male Comedy Performance.

In 2007, he directed the music videos for the songs "Fluorescent Adolescent" by Arctic Monkeys and Super Furry Animals's "Run-Away", which starred Matt Berry. The former received a UK Music Video Award nomination, attributed by Ayoade only to the song being "so good". Ayoade has frequently appeared as a panellist on The Big Fat Quiz of the Year, often with Noel Fielding, making his first appearance on The Big Fat Anniversary Quiz in 2007, which marked Channel 4's 25th anniversary.

In 2008, Ayoade directed the music videos for two Vampire Weekend singles: "Oxford Comma", filmed in one long take, and "Cape Cod Kwassa Kwassa". That year he also directed videos for The Last Shadow Puppets songs "Standing Next to Me" and "My Mistakes Were Made for You", the latter of which was inspired by Federico Fellini's Toby Dammit. He directed a live Arctic Monkeys DVD, At the Apollo (2008), recorded at the Manchester Apollo on super 16mm film. It was previewed at Vue cinemas across the UK in October 2008 and released on DVD the next month. Ayoade was featured in Paul King's 2009 film Bunny and the Bull, playing an extremely boring museum tour guide. That year he also directed two music videos for the Arctic Monkeys, "Crying Lightning" and "Cornerstone", and videos for Kasabian's "Vlad the Impaler", starring Fielding, and "Heads Will Roll" by the Yeah Yeah Yeahs.

In 2010, Ayoade made his debut directorial feature, Submarine, a coming-of-age comedy-drama he adapted from Joe Dunthorne's 2008 novel of the same name. The film stars newcomers Craig Roberts and Yasmin Paige with Sally Hawkins, Noah Taylor, and Paddy Considine. It follows Welsh teenager Oliver Tate (Roberts) as he becomes infatuated with a classmate (Paige) and the turmoil of his parents' failing relationship. Produced by Warp Films and Film4, it premiered at the 35th Toronto International Film Festival in September 2010, had a general release in the UK in March 2011, and was released in June in the US after being picked up by the Weinstein Company for North America. Arctic Monkeys and The Last Shadow Puppets frontman Alex Turner contributed five original songs to the soundtrack, inspired by Simon & Garfunkel's music in The Graduate (1967). The film was positively received by critics, with The Guardian critic Peter Bradshaw calling Ayoade a "tremendous new voice in British film". Ayoade was nominated for a BAFTA for Outstanding Debut by a British Writer, Director or Producer at the 65th British Academy Film Awards.

=== 2011–present: Mainstream cinema, satirical writing, and television presenting ===
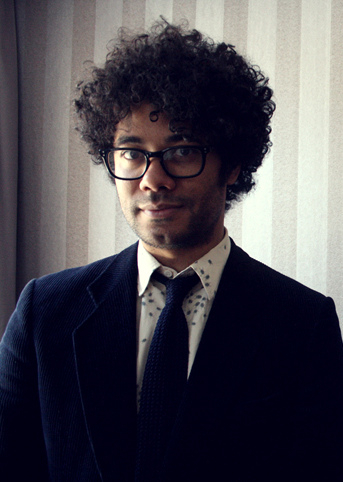
Ayoade in 2011

In 2011, Ayoade directed the Community episode "Critical Film Studies" in the comedy show's second season. The episode pays homage to the 1981 film My Dinner with Andre and was named the "most brilliant half-hour of TV to arrive in this century" by Rolling Stone writer Rob Sheffield. Ayoade then directed a performance of comedian Tommy Tiernan's world stand-up tour, Crooked Man, which was released in November 2011. Ayoade provided his voice to the main cast of Channel 4's ill-received animated sitcom Full English, which aired for just five episodes in 2012 before being cancelled. Ayoade starred opposite Ben Stiller, Vince Vaughn, and Jonah Hill in the science fiction comedy The Watch as a neighbourhood watch group that uncovers alien forces threatening the world. The film was not well received by critics, although Ayoade's performance was praised. Keith Phipps of The A.V. Club felt the film's "brightest spots" came courtesy of Ayoade, while Michael Phillips of the Chicago Tribune felt Ayoade was "the reason it's not entirely lame". Also in 2012, Ayoade began voicing Todd Lagoona, an anthropomorphic hammerhead shark who was a recurring character in Noel Fielding's Luxury Comedy.

From 2013 to 2014, Ayoade voiced Templeton, the class nerd, in the CBBC animated series Strange Hill High. He replaced Stephen Fry as presenter in the second series of Channel 4's Gadget Man in September 2013, and also presented a third and fourth season. The series featured Ayoade presenting a variety of innovative products and gadgets. He was also the host of the spin-off series Travel Man, where he spent 48 hours in a different location each episode with a celebrity guest. He was a team captain on the Channel 4 panel show Was It Something I Said?, which began airing October 2013 and co-starred David Mitchell as host and Micky Flanagan as fellow team captain. Also in 2013, Ayoade read Roald Dahl's children book The Twits for Penguin Audio's audiobook collection and Virgin Media launched an advertising campaign starring the Jamaican sprinter Usain Bolt featuring the voice of Ayoade. He provided the voice-over for Apple's iPhone 6 UK campaign with Chris O'Dowd in 2014. He also appears on Channel 4's 8 out of 10 Cats Does Countdown, usually at least once per season.

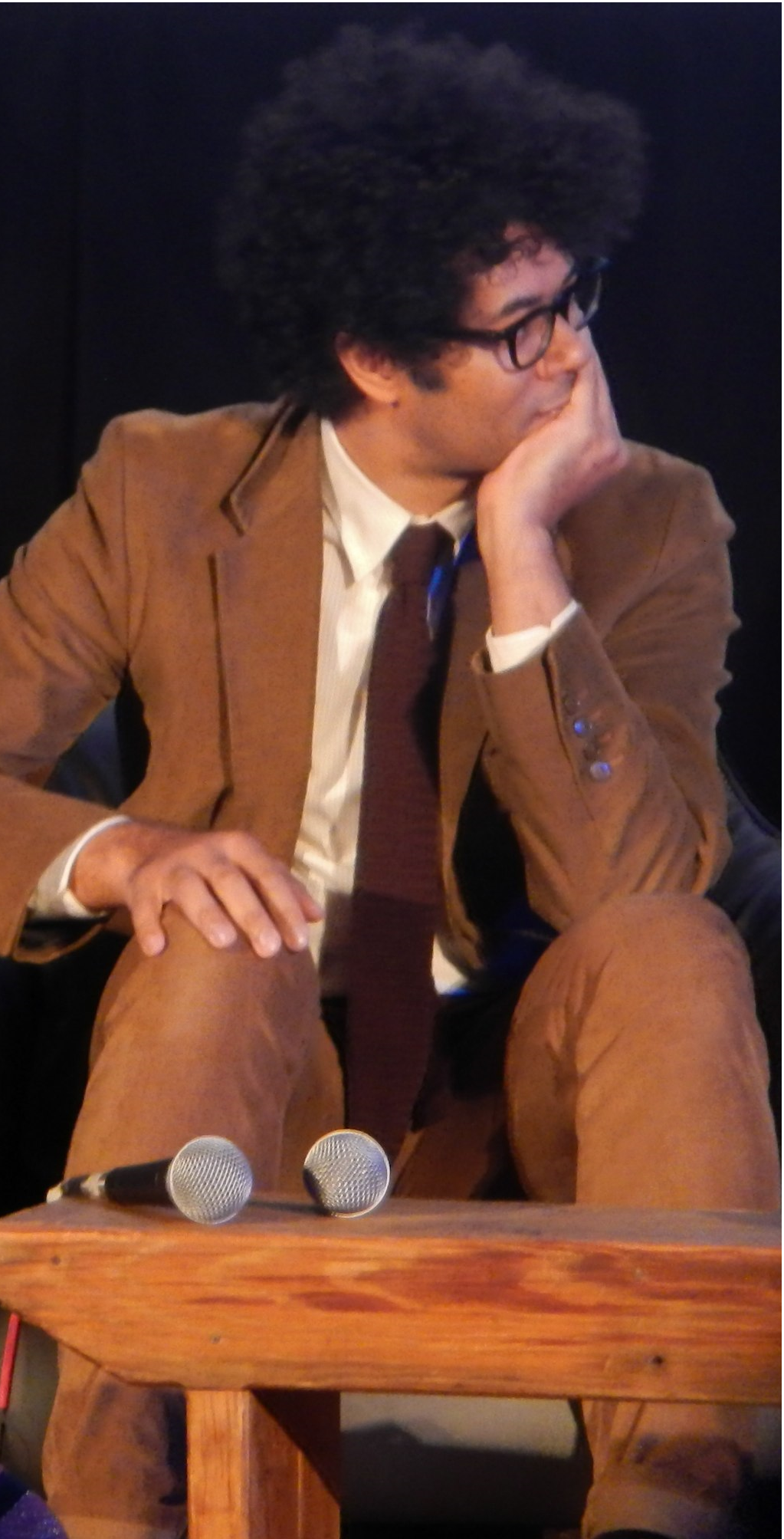
Ayoade at the 2014 Sundance Film Festival

Ayoade's second feature film, the black comedy thriller The Double, was based on Fyodor Dostoyevsky's 1846 novella The Double; it was written by Ayoade and Avi Korine and stars Jesse Eisenberg and Mia Wasikowska. It concerns a timid man who becomes frustrated by the appearance of his charming doppelgänger, both of whom are played by Eisenberg. It was released in April 2014 to generally positive reviews, drawing comparisons to Terry Gilliam's Brazil (1985) in its visuals and narrative. In the stop-motion animated fantasy film The Boxtrolls (2014), Ayoade voiced Mr. Pickles, a henchman to the film's antagonist Snatcher (voiced by Ben Kingsley).

Ayoade's first book, Ayoade on Ayoade: A Cinematic Odyssey, was published by Faber and Faber in October 2014. It parodies Faber's Directors on Directors series, where critically celebrated filmmakers discuss their work, and sees Ayoade conduct several fictional interviews with himself where he discusses his work and enthusiasm for the world of cinema. Ayoade voiced a villainous snowman in several episodes of the 2015 reboot of the animated series Danger Mouse. In June 2016, he directed a short music video for the Radiohead song "Tinker Tailor Soldier Sailor Rich Man Poor Man Beggar Man Thief", as part of a series of video vignettes to promote their album A Moon Shaped Pool.

Ayoade took over as host of the Channel 4 game show The Crystal Maze in 2017, following the success of a celebrity charity special revival hosted by Stephen Merchant. His style of presenting has been described as being "a more cerebral and intense version" of his IT Crowd character, Maurice Moss. Ayoade made a cameo appearance in the comedy sequel Paddington 2 as a forensic investigator in 2017 and was amongst the voice cast for Vampire Weekend Ezra Koenig's animated series Neo Yokio in the same year. His second book, The Grip Of Film, was published in October 2017. Written in the perspective of clueless film fanatic Gordy LaSure, in its canon is an A-Z of films and what makes them good with footnotes by Ayoade. Beginning in late 2017, he has guest hosted a number of episodes of the panel show Have I Got News for You. Ayoade starred in an advertisement for HSBC in 2018, which addressed other countries' cultural impact on the United Kingdom ahead of Brexit; appearing in four more in the following years Ayoade voiced Treebor, a Stone Age caveman, in the Aardman Animations stop-motion comedy Early Man (2018).

From 2018 to 2021, Ayoade voiced Onion, one of the title characters in the Cartoon Network animated series Apple & Onion. He also returned to music video directing in 2018, helming the science fiction-inspired video for The Breeders song "Spacewoman". Ayoade was featured in a supporting role as a pompous artist in both parts of Joanna Hogg's two-part drama The Souvenir. He lent his voice as a talking ice cream cone to the animated comedy sequel The Lego Movie 2: The Second Part (2019)–which also featured Noel Fielding– and the English version of the Finnish series Moominvalley. Ayoade provided voice work for the Star Wars Disney+ series The Mandalorian (2019) where he voiced the droid Zero in a recurring role. He also lent his voice for the animated adult fantasy sitcom Disenchantment (2021) on Netflix where he voiced the character Alva Gunderson.

Ayoade on Top, his third book published by Faber and Faber, is a tongue-in-cheek ode to the critically maligned romantic comedy View from the Top starring Gwyneth Paltrow. The Financial Times included Ayoade on Top in its collection of the best books of 2019 and Ayoade was ranked 33rd of the 50 best comedians of the 21st century in a 2019 list published by The Guardian.

In May 2020, it was announced that Ayoade would host the 2020 British Academy Television Awards, which was held behind closed doors due to the COVID-19 pandemic. He returned to host the 2021 and 2022 ceremonies.

In 2023, Ayoade was announced to direct, write and star in an adaptation of George Saunders' short story The Semplica Girl Diaries that would co-star his wife Lydia Fox, and previous collaborators Ben Stiller and Sally Hawkins.

Ayoade featured as two supporting characters in Wes Anderson's short film The Wonderful Story of Henry Sugar, which premiered on September 1, 2023 at the 80th Venice International Film Festival. Ayoade starred as Doctor Marshall and the Great Yogi. The film is the first in a four-part series of shorts adapted from short stories by Roald Dahl directed by Anderson. Ayoade additionally acted as the narrator of the third short in the series, The Rat Catcher, playing a newspaper editor. Ayoade has continued to work with Anderson, starring as Sergio (a revolutionary guerilla) in The Phoenician Scheme, released in May 2025. In May 2025, Anderson announced he was working with Ayoade on a script for a future film.

Ayoade's 2024 book, The Unfinished Harauld Hughes, was described by Sam Leith in The Guardian as "the narrative of the making of a documentary that never gets made, about a movie that also never got made. Its protagonist-narrator is Richard Ayoade, an alter ego of the author of the book, Richard Ayoade. He's in search of an alter ego of his own – or, at least, a doppelganger. ... Its comic tenor is part satirical and part pure whimsy, and it's very beguiling." It was shortlisted for the 2025 Bollinger Everyman Wodehouse Prize.

In March 2025, Ayoade starred in LOL: Last One Laughing UK. In March 2026 he joined the cast of Sonic The Hedgehog 4, and in June 2026, it was announced Ayoade would be a part of series 22 of Taskmaster and the sixth series of Only Murders in the Building. He is also a team captain on Ed Gamble's Unacceptable!, alongside Joanne McNally.

== Influences ==
Ayoade is a fan of French New Wave cinema and said in an interview with The Guardian that Louis Malle's Zazie dans le Métro was the film that sparked his interest in filmmaking. His favourite filmmakers include Malle, Woody Allen, Ingmar Bergman, Orson Welles, Jean-Luc Godard, Jean-Pierre Melville, and Paul Thomas Anderson.

Ayoade participated in the 2012 Sight & Sound directors' poll, where he listed his 10 favourite films: The Apartment, Badlands, Barry Lyndon, Crimes and Misdemeanors, Make Way for Tomorrow, Contempt, Ordet, Persona, Raging Bull, and Tokyo Story.

== Personal life ==
In 2007, Ayoade married Lydia Fox, a member of the Fox family of actors. They have two children and live in the East Dulwich area of London. Ayoade and his brother-in-law, actor Laurence Fox, engaged in a vocal public feud in 2020, when Fox asked Ayoade to announce his support for him on Twitter after a controversial appearance on Question Time. The episode in question was condemned for allowing Fox on as a guest, in particular for when he told a black woman in the audience that discussing racism was "boring". According to Fox, Ayoade told him that "You have never encountered racism". Fox stated that he had told Ayoade he had, because "he worked in Kenya once" and "racism can be deferential."

In September 2023, Ayoade received backlash on social media after endorsing the memoir of television writer and anti-transgender activist Graham Linehan, with whom he had worked on The IT Crowd.

== Filmography ==
Key
†	Denotes films that have not yet been released

=== Film ===
Year	Title	Role	Notes
2003	Hello Friend	Computer Man	Short film
2004	The Life and Death of Peter Sellers	Wedding Photographer	TV film
2005	Festival	Dwight Swan	
2008	At the Apollo	—N/a	Concert film; director
2009	Bunny and the Bull	Museum Curator	
2010	Submarine	—N/a	Director and writer British Independent Film Award for Best Screenplay; Palm Springs International Film Festival Directors to Watch Award; Giffoni Film Festival Award for Best Film; Nominated—BAFTA Award for Outstanding Debut by a British Writer, Director or Producer; Nominated—London Film Critics' Circle Award for Breakthrough British Filmmaker; Nominated—Evening Standard British Film Award for Most Promising Newcomer; Nominated—Writers' Guild of Great Britain Award for Best Film Screenplay
2012	The Watch	Jamarcus	
2013	The Double	—N/a	Director and writer Nominated—London Film Festival Award for Best Film; Nominated—Black Reel Award for Best Foreign Film; Nominated—Tallinn Black Nights Film Festival Grand Prize; Nominated—Tokyo International Film Festival Grand Prix
2014	The Boxtrolls	Mr. Pickles	Voice
2017	Paddington 2	Forensic Investigator	Cameo
2018	Early Man	Treebor	Voice
2019	The Lego Movie 2: The Second Part	Ice Cream Cone	Voice
2019	The Souvenir	Patrick	
2020	Soul	Counselor Jerry B	Voice
2021	22 vs. Earth	Counselor Jerry B	Voice; short film
2021	The Souvenir Part II	Patrick	Nominated—British Independent Film Award for Best Supporting Actor
2021	The Electrical Life of Louis Wain	Henry Wood	
2022	The Bad Guys	Professor Rupert Marmalade IV	Voice
2023	The Wonderful Story of Henry Sugar	Dr. Marshall / The Great Yogi	Short film
2023	The Rat Catcher	Editor/Reporter	Short film
2025	The Phoenician Scheme	Sergio	
2025	The Bad Guys 2	Professor Rupert Marmalade IV	Voice
2027	Sonic the Hedgehog 4 †	TBA	Filming

=== Television ===
Year	Title	Role	Notes
2000	Bruiser	—N/a	Additional material writer
2004	Garth Marenghi's Darkplace	Dean Learner / Thornton Reed	6 episodes; also co-creator, writer, and director
2004	AD/BC: A Rock Opera	Joseph	Television special; also writer and director
2004–2007	The Mighty Boosh	Saboo	5 episodes; also script editor and wrote episode: "The Chokes"
2005	Nathan Barley	Ned Smanks	6 episodes
2006	Man to Man with Dean Learner	Dean Learner	6 episodes; also co-creator, writer, director, and executive producer
2006	Time Trumpet	Himself	6 episodes
2006	Snuff Box	Music Show Host	2 episodes
2006–2010, 2013	The IT Crowd	Maurice Moss	25 episodes British Academy Television Award for Best Male Comedy Performance (2014)
2007–present	The Big Fat Quiz	Himself (panelist)	18 episodes
2011	Community	—N/a	Directed episode: "Critical Film Studies"
2011	Crooked Man	—N/a	Stand-up special; director
2012	Full English	Edgar	Voice, 6 episodes
2012–2014	Noel Fielding's Luxury Comedy	Various characters	6 episodes
2013	Was It Something I Said?	Himself (panelist)	8 episodes
2013–2014	Strange Hill High	Templeton	Voice, 26 episodes
2013–2015	Gadget Man	Himself (host)	19 episodes
2015	The Vicar of Dibley	Bernard	Episode: "The Bishop of Dibley"
2015–2018	Danger Mouse	The Snowman	Voice, 4 episodes
2015–2019	Travel Man	Himself (host)	39 episodes
2016	Alan Davies: As Yet Untitled	Himself	Episode: "A Penis Poking Through The Window"
2017–2018	Neo Yokio	Herbert Sims	Voice, 4 episodes
2017–2020	The Crystal Maze	Himself (host)	45 episodes
2017–present	Have I Got News for You	Himself (guest host)	11 episodes
2018–2021	Apple & Onion	Onion, additional characters	Voice, 76 episodes
2019	Moominvalley	The Ghost	Voice, 2 episodes
2019–2020	The Mandalorian	Q9-0	Voice, 2 episodes
2020	2020 British Academy Television Awards	Himself (host)	Television special
2020–2021	Hypothetical	Himself (panellist)	2 episodes
2021	Code 404	B.R.I.A.N.	Voice, 3 episodes
2021	2021 British Academy Television Awards	Himself (host)	Television special
2021–2022	Question Team	Himself (host)	16 episodes
2021–2023	Disenchantment	Gordy / Alva Gunderson	Voice, 10 episodes
2021–present	Rugrats	Duffy	Voice, 7 episodes
2022	2022 British Academy Television Awards	Himself (host)	Television special
2022	Birdgirl	Hugh	Voice, 5 episodes
2023	Kung Fu Panda: The Dragon Knight	Kyle	Voice, 5 episodes
2023	Black Mirror	His Own Actual Voice	Voice, episode: "Loch Henry"
2023–present	Krapopolis	Tyrannis	Main voice role
2024	Monsters at Work	Declan	Voice, 4 episodes
2024	Transformers: EarthSpark	Fairmaestro	Voice, 2 episodes
2024	SpongeBob SquarePants	Sammy Suckerfish	Voice, episode: "Sammy Suckerfish"
2024	Hamster & Gretel	Clem Clam	Voice, 2 episodes
2024	Dream Productions	Kenny "Xeni" Dewberry	Voice, 4 episodes
2025	LOL: Last One Laughing UK	Himself (contestant)	6 episodes
2026	Star Wars: Maul – Shadow Lord	Two-Boots	Voice, 10 episodes
2026	Taskmaster	Himself (contestant)	Series 22, 10 episodes

=== Video games ===
Year	Title	Role	Notes
2027	Fable †	Dave the Giant	Voice and motion capture

=== Music videos directed ===
Year	Artist	Song
2007	Arctic Monkeys	"Fluorescent Adolescent"
2007	Super Furry Animals	"Run-Away"
2008	Vampire Weekend	"Oxford Comma"
2008	The Last Shadow Puppets	"Standing Next to Me"
2008	The Last Shadow Puppets	"My Mistakes Were Made for You"
2008	Vampire Weekend	"Cape Cod Kwassa Kwassa"
2009	Kasabian	"Vlad the Impaler"
2009	Arctic Monkeys	"Crying Lightning"
2009	Arctic Monkeys	"Cornerstone"
2009	Yeah Yeah Yeahs	"Heads Will Roll"
2016	Radiohead	"Tinker Tailor Soldier Sailor Rich Man Poor Man Beggar Man Thief"; Short video vignette
2018	The Breeders	"Spacewoman"
2025	Kim Deal	"Big Ben Beat"

== Bibliography ==
Year	Title
2014	Ayoade on Ayoade: A Cinematic Odyssey
2017	The Grip of Film
2019	Ayoade On Top
2022	The Book That No One Wanted to Read
2024	The Fairy Tale Fan Club: Legendary Letters collected by C.C. Cecily
2024	The Unfinished Harauld Hughes
2024	Four Films: presented by Richard Ayoade, by Harauld Hughes
2024	The Models Trilogy: presented by Richard Ayoade, by Harauld Hughes
2024	Plays, Prose, Pieces, Poetry: presented by Richard Ayoade, by Harauld Hughes
2025	Afterthoughts: Or Some Pistachios Won't Open – Wisdom for the Unreflective
