= Garth Marenghi's Netherhead =

British stage play

Garth Marenghi's Netherhead was a low-budget comedy horror stage show written by Matthew Holness and Richard Ayoade, and starring Holness, Ayoade, and Alice Lowe. It was performed at the 2001 Edinburgh Festival Fringe, where it won the Perrier Award.

The show was built around Holness's spoof horror writer character Garth Marenghi, with additional parts played by Ayoade (as Marenghi's publisher Dean Learner) and Lowe.

Netherhead was the sequel to Garth Marenghi's Fright Knight, which was nominated for the Perrier Award in 2000.
