= Garth Marenghi =

Fictional horror author

- Matthew Holness as Garth Marenghi
- Created by: Matthew Holness
- Portrayed by: Matthew Holness

In-universe information
- Gender: Male
- Occupation: Horror author TV showrunner and actor Self-described "dream-weaver" and "visionary"
- Spouse: Pam Marenghi
- Children: Meredith, Jocasta, Katrina, one unnamed daughter
- Home: Barnes
- Nationality: British
- Born: 1950; Leytonstone

Garth Marenghi is a fictional horror author created by British comedian Matthew Holness. He is depicted as a conceited hack writer, who remains blissfully (or even wilfully) unaware of his lack of talent. Holness has used Marenghi as the framing device for a number of horror parody works, which the character presents as the products of his own supposed genius.

The character has appeared in two stage shows, the Perrier Award-nominated Garth Marenghi's Fright Knight and Perrier Award-winning Garth Marenghi's Netherhead, and the Channel 4 TV series Garth Marenghi's Darkplace and Man to Man with Dean Learner.

After winning the Perrier Award, the creators confounded media sources by refusing to speak out of character, or give real names or backgrounds.

== Character ==
Garth Marenghi is a spoof pulp horror author; his act and his works are considered a parody of the horror genre.

The character is highly conceited and narcissistic, often described through epithets such as "the dream weaver", "shaman", "titan of terror", "The One Man Fear Factory", “The Fright Honourable”, and "master of the macabre." Marenghi speaks in an exaggerated, doltish South Eastern accent, possibly located around Romford, Essex, or Leytonstone. Rather like E. L. Wisty, arguably the accent might have associations with an odd, imbecilic pub bore: somebody that one might avoid. The accent comically undermines the often pretentious, absurd and grandiose things the character says. In interviews, he compares himself positively with James Joyce, Shakespeare, Leonardo da Vinci, and Jesus.

Despite this, Marenghi displays a general ignorance of many subjects of which he claims knowledge. He claims to be self-taught, having left school young ("I knew by the age of eight that my education had finished"), and despite his claims to being a literary genius he rarely reads books. When he needs to learn about a subject, he will "hire someone to go and find out about it." In both stage shows, in the official website, and in numerous interviews he claims to have written more books than he has read.

Marenghi displays other traits including sexism, xenophobia, and extreme paranoia. Darkplace protagonist Rick Dagless is largely characterized as an author insert of Marenghi, drawing on his own insecurities and experiences in writing him. During the Darkplace Illuminatum DVD feature Marenghi comments "In many ways he is an extension of my own natural abilities. He's got a little more than me. He is a little more tragic than I am, as a character. He's seen the dark side. A little too much."

He is depicted as married with four daughters, though disappointed at not having a son. The Darkplace episode "Skipper the Eye Child" explains this, and references this in its plot with Dagless shown as having a deceased son who was half boy, half grasshopper.

== Appearances ==
I'm Garth Marenghi. Author, dream-weaver, visionary, plus actor. You are about to enter the world of my imagination. You are entering my Darkplace

— Title sequence of Garth Marenghi's Darkplace

=== Stage ===
The character of Marenghi was invented for the horror parody stage show Garth Marenghi's Fright Knight.

=== Garth Marenghi's Darkplace ===
The 2004 show Garth Marenghi's Darkplace is based on the premise that Garth Marenghi wrote and starred in a 1980s low-budget hospital-based horror show. Within this fictional context, 50 shows were created, but were never shown as they were suppressed by "MI-8" for being "too subversive, too dangerous, too damn scary."

=== Other television appearances ===
Marenghi also guests in the first episode of Dean Learner's talk series, Man to Man with Dean Learner, where he reveals that he lost an ear in an ambulance crash, has written a total of 436 books, and has filmed a new movie, War of the Wasps, featuring most of the cast of Garth Marenghi's Darkplace. Marenghi has appeared in an episode of the Russell Howard Hour as part of a Christmas special to read a portion of one of his novels, Flay Bells Sting, Are You Glistening?

=== Tours ===
Beginning in 2022, Holness has also used Garth Marenghi as a pen name for his horror parody books, giving a series of book tours in character as Marenghi.

=== Podcast ===
In 2025, Holness launched the podcast Garth Marenghi's Skull-Flusher, in which he interviews "terror titans" as Marenghi, starting with horror film director Mike Flanagan.

== Holness bibliography ==
=== Novels ===
- Garth Marenghi's TerrorTome (2022)
  - Matthew Holness published Garth Marenghi's TerrorTome, written under the Garth Marenghi pseudonym in November 2022; it is available as a hardback, paperback, ebook and audiobook. Release of the book was followed by a book tour, where Holness would read extracts of the book in-character as Marenghi and then conduct a Q&A with the audience.
- Garth Marenghi's Incarcerat (2023)
  - A follow up to TerrorTome was released on Halloween 2023, aligning with an associated book tour.
- Garth Marenghi's This Bursted Earth (2025)
  - A follow up to Incarcerat released on October 30th 2025, aligning with an associated book tour. The book is publicised as being the final book in the "TerrorTome Trilogy".

=== Short stories ===
- Garth Marenghi's Throttle and Bribes (2025)

== Fictional bibliography ==
=== Novels ===
- Afterbirth (novel mentioned in Darkplace)
- Eye Sore (novel mentioned on official website)
- Hellbent (novel mentioned in Man to Man with Dean Learner)
- Hellbenders (novel mentioned in Man to Man with Dean Learner)
- Hellbenders II: The Boys are Back (novel mentioned in Man to Man with Dean Learner)
- Return of the Coil (novel mentioned in Man to Man with Dean Learner)
- Return of the Coil: Reentry (novel mentioned in Man to Man with Dean Learner)
- The Ooze (novel mentioned on official website)
- The Ooze 2: Return of the Ouzze (novel mentioned during radio interview)
- Ooze 2: Squit Rising (novel mentioned on Twitter)
- Black Fang (novel mentioned in Darkplace)
- Tomb Boy (novel mentioned in Darkplace)
- Quivers (novel mentioned in Darkplace DVD supplementary material)
- CRAB!! (novel mentioned in Darkplace)
- Dawn Waters (novel mentioned on official website)
- Juggers (novel mentioned in Darkplace)
- Bitch Killer (novel mentioned in Man to Man with Dean Learner)
- Beyond the Valley of the Screams (mentioned on official website)
- Stump (novel mentioned in Man to Man with Dean Learner)
- The Told (novel mentioned in Darkplace)
- Flay Bells Sting, Are You Glistening? (i.e. Having Just Been Flayed) (novel mentioned in The Russell Howard Hour)
- Brain Jerk (novel mentioned in Man to Man with Dean Learner)
- The Dank (novel mentioned during Netherhead press)
- Retch (novel mentioned on official website)
- Overdrawn and Quartered (aka Pay or Flay) (novel mentioned in The Reel Feedback Podcast #89)
- The Deadly Dust (novel mentioned on official website)
- Rupture (novel mentioned during Netherhead press)
- The Womb of Mad (novel mentioned in pre-Darkplace press)
- Greyballs: The Legend of Greyballs (novel mentioned during The Mighty Boosh Festival)
- The Yapping (novel mentioned during The Mighty Boosh Festival)
- The Stealth-Hive Parallax (novel mentioned in The Irish Independent article)
- London Fiends (novel mentioned in Darkplace)
- Digit (set of five novels mentioned in a letter)
- The Premonitioner (novel mentioned in Total Film article)
- Tomb Without a View (limited print run novel mentioned on Resonance FM's OST)
- Bitchfinder General (novel on parchment, mentioned on Resonance FM's OST)
- Night of the Haddock (novel mention on Off Menu with Ed Gamble and James Acaster #212)
- Haddock 2: More Killer Haddock (novel mentioned on Off Menu)
- Haddock 5: The Haddocking (unpublished novel mentioned on Off Menu)
- Afternoon of the Haddock (novel mentioned on Off Menu)
- The Man-Gorgon (novel mentioned in Incarcerat)
- Guygon (novel mentioned in Incarcerat)
- Galgon (novel mentioned in Incarcerat)
- Bride of Guygon (novel mentioned in Incarcerat)
- Guygon vs Galgon (novel mentioned in Incarcerat)
- Galgon Rising (novel mentioned in Incarcerat)
- Guygon 2012 (Stone Free) (novel mentioned in Incarcerat)
- The Krilling (novel mentioned on Twitter)
- The Kriller Killer (novel mentioned on Twitter)
- Killer Kriller (novel mentioned on Twitter)
- The Krills Have Eyes (novel mentioned on Twitter)

=== Series ===
- Slicer
  - Slicer (novel mentioned in Darkplace)
  - Slasher (novel mentioned in Darkplace)
  - R.I.P.P.E.R. (novel mentioned in Darkplace)
  - Slicer IV: The Blade is Back (novel mentioned in Darkplace)
- Stingpregnators
  - Marenghi's cosmic parasitic space wasp quintology (mentioned in The Irish Independent article)
- Locust Rex
  - Volumes 1–10 (mentioned in The Irish Independent article)

=== Early novels ===
The following titles are mentioned in TerrorTome as books written by the protagonist, Nick Steen. In The Reel Feedback Podcast #89, Marenghi stated that readers may recognise the titles being the same as his own fledgling efforts in the early eighties.

- Hives
- The Itching
- Sunburner
- Woebetigo
- The Shingler
- Night of the Eczeman
- Eczeman 2: Derma-die-sis
- Rosacea's Baby
- The Swelling
- The Burning
- The Flaking
- The Crusting
- A Scab in the Dark (Scabman)
- Scabman 2: Return of the Scabman
- Scabman 3: No Pickin'
- Psychoriasis (The Bleeder)
- Psychoriasis 2 (The Bleeder 2)
- Psychoriasis 3: Revenge of the Flesh Heads (aka Bleeder vs Scabman)

=== Collections ===
- A Little Bite of What You Fancy (mentioned on official website)
- Dead Centre (mentioned on official website)
- The Oeuvre (collection of all 436 novels, mentioned in Man to Man with Dean Learner)
- The Oeuvre 2: The Last Bookender (mentioned on social media)

=== Short stories ===
- Garth See Dog, Car Hit Dog, Garth Poke Dog (Marenghi's first story, mentioned in The Reel Feedback Podcast #89)
- Stake Out (mentioned on official website)
- Gobble Gobble (mentioned on official website)
- The Streaming Face (mentioned on official website)
- The Ague (mentioned on official website)
- Face Bottom (mentioned on official website)
- Mindgrid (mentioned on official website)

=== Tabletop Games ===
- Garth Marenghi's Role Slaying Game (mentioned in SKULL FLUSHER 2)
