= Matthew Holness =

British comedian (born 1975)

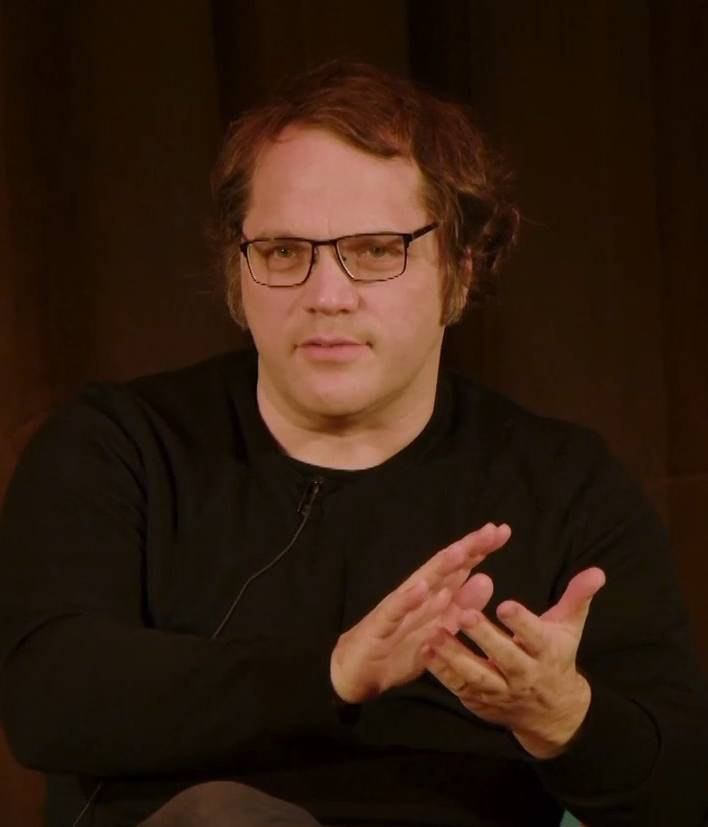
- Holness in 2023
- Born: Matthew James Holness; 1974 or 1975 (age 51–52); Whitstable, Kent, England
- Education: Trinity Hall, Cambridge
- Occupations: Actor, comedian, writer, director
- Known for: Garth Marenghi

Matthew James Holness (born 1974 or 1975) is a British comedian, actor, director and author. He is known for creating and portraying the fictional horror author Garth Marenghi.

== Early life and education ==
Born in Whitstable, Kent, Holness became a fan of Hammer horror films at a young age, to the extent that when, at the age of six, he asked Hammer star and fellow Whitstable resident Peter Cushing for his autograph, Cushing expressed concern that the child knew so much about the films. Holness attended Chaucer Technology School in Canterbury and went on to read English at Trinity Hall, Cambridge, where he received a Master of Arts degree from Cambridge, graduating in absentia due to his comedy work. As a member of the Cambridge Footlights, he appeared in a number of shows at the Edinburgh Festival Fringe in the mid-1990s. He also served as vice-president when David Mitchell was president. Other contemporaries included Robert Webb, Richard Ayoade and John Oliver.

== Career ==
Holness first appeared on television as a cast-member of the short-lived BBC Two comedy series Bruiser in 2000. In the same year, Garth Marenghi's Fright Knight, a stage show written by Holness and Ayoade and starring the pair along with Alice Lowe, was nominated for the Perrier Award at the Edinburgh Fringe. The show was built around a spoof horror writer named Garth Marenghi. The sequel, Garth Marenghi's Netherhead, won the Perrier Award the following year.

He played the role of Simon, an arrogant and sarcastic computer technician in series two of The Office, which aired in 2002. About the same time, he appeared in the comedy stage play The Mighty Boosh, filling the role of Bob Fossil while regular cast member Rich Fulcher was overseas.

In 2004, the character of Garth Marenghi transferred to television with the Channel 4 horror comedy Garth Marenghi's Darkplace. Despite critical acclaim and later, a cult following, the series suffered from relatively low ratings when first broadcast.

In 2009, he appeared in the Channel 4 sitcom Free Agents. A year later he played the part of a bandleader in Cemetery Junction, a dramedy film by Ricky Gervais and Stephen Merchant.

In 2011, he played a minor role in the first episode of the Channel 4 sitcom Friday Night Dinner. The same year, "A Gun for George" was released. This was a short film written and directed by Holness in which he plays an angry loner who writes pulp-fiction crime novels about a vigilante called the Reprisalizer. He played the part of a smug lawyer in Life's Too Short, a sitcom starring Warwick Davis.

Holness wrote and directed a 2012 short film for Sky Arts' Playhouse Presents series entitled "The Snipist", which depicted a dystopian alternative 1970s Britain stricken by rabies. Douglas Henshall starred, with John Hurt providing the voice of the Ministry.

Holness wrote and directed the 2016 "Smutch", a Halloween Comedy Short shown on Sky Arts, in which he played an embittered author haunted by a ghostwriter.

In 2018, he played the part of brooding Swedish detective Knut Ångström in the BBC Radio 4 Nordic noir parody Angstrom.

The following year, he played Prince Hector of Bulgaria in an episode of the Channel 4 sitcom Year of the Rabbit. The same year, Holness made his debut as a feature director with Possum, a psychological horror film set in Norfolk. He described the film as "not remotely funny". In interviews to promote Possum, Holness said he had written a script for another horror film which he was also hoping to get made.

In 2022, Holness announced a short fiction collection entitled Garth Marenghi's TerrorTome. This was written as Marenghi and presented as one of the character's own works, which Marenghi began working on in the 1980s. It was also released as an audiobook narrated by Holness as Marenghi. The collection was released in November 2022.

Two follow-ups to Garth Marenghi's TerrorTome were released: Garth Marenghi’s Incarcerat in October 2023 and Garth Marenghi’s This Bursted Earth in October 2025.

== Filmography ==
=== Film ===
| Year | Title | Role | Notes |
|---|---|---|---|
| 2005 | Festival | Roger | |
| 2010 | Cemetery Junction | The Band Leader | |
| 2011 | A Gun for George | Terry Finch | Short film; also director, writer and composer |
| 2018 | Possum | —N/a | Director and writer |

=== Television ===
| Year | Title | Role | Notes |
|---|---|---|---|
| 2000 | Bruiser | Various roles | 6 episodes; also writer |
| 2002 | The Office | Simon | Episode: "Motivation" |
| 2004 | Garth Marenghi's Darkplace | Garth Marenghi / Dr. Rick Dagless M.D. | 6 episodes; also co-creator and writer |
| 2005 | Casanova | Landlord | Episode #1.1 |
| 2006 | Time Trumpet | Himself | 6 episodes |
| 2006 | Man to Man with Dean Learner | Various roles | 6 episodes; also co-creator, writer and executive producer |
| 2009 | Free Agents | Dan Mackey | 6 episodes |
| 2011 | Friday Night Dinner | Chris | Episode: "The Sofa Bed" |
| 2011 | Life's Too Short | Ian Wold | 3 episodes |
| 2012 | Playhouse Presents | —N/a | Episode: "The Snipist"; director and writer |
| 2014 | Toast of London | Max Gland | Episode: "Buried Alive" |
| 2016 | Smutch | Oswin | Television short; also director, writer and composer |
| 2017 | Back | Laurie | 4 episodes |
| 2019 | Year of the Rabbit | Prince Hector of Bulgaria | Episode #1.4 |
| 2020 | The Haunting of Bly Manor | Dominic Wingrave | 2 episodes |
| 2021 | Bloods | Phil | 1 episode |
| 2021 | We Are Lady Parts | Gameshow Host | Episode: "Sparta" |
| 2022 | Toast of Tinseltown | Richard Chickentoss | Episode: "Doctor Grainger" |
| 2023 | Dodger | Sir Denholm Havers | 1 episode |

=== Radio ===
| Year | Title | Role | Notes |
|---|---|---|---|
| 2004 | The Department | Keith Bilk | 14 episodes |
| 2018 | Angstrom | Knut Ångström | 4 episodes |

== Bibliography ==
| Year | Title | Book | Notes |
|---|---|---|---|
| 2007 | 'Sounds Between' | Phobic: Modern Horror Stories | Anthology |
| 2008 | 'Possum' | The New Uncanny | Anthology |
| 2008 | 'The Toad and I' | Black Static 3 | Magazine |
| 2014 | 'Possum'? | Dead Funny: Horror Stories by Comedians | Anthology |
| 2014 | 'Introduction' | Reminiscences of a Bachelor | Reprint |
| 2016 | (voiceover) | From Frazzled to Fabulous: How to Juggle Fatherhood, a Successful Career, 'Me Time' and Looking Good | Audiobook |
| 2017 | (voiceover) | The Scarifyers: The Gnomes of Death | Audiobook |
| 2017 | 'The Mastiff: A story of The Diggers' | Protest: Stories of Resistance | Anthology |
| 2017 | (cast: Eric Drazen) | Doctor Who: The Lure of the Nomad | Audiobook |
| 2022 | (Original author; audiobook narrator) | Garth Marenghi's TerrorTome | Novel; audiobook |
| 2023 | (Original author; audiobook narrator) | Garth Marenghi's Incarcerat | Novel; audiobook |
| 2025 | (Original author; audiobook narrator) | Garth Marenghi's This Bursted Earth | Novel; audiobook |
