= Man to Man with Dean Learner =

- Title card from Man to Man with Dean Learner
- Genre: Talk show
- Created by: Richard Ayoade; Matthew Holness
- Based on: Dean Learner by Richard Ayoade; Matthew Holness
- Starring: Richard Ayoade; Matthew Holness
- Country of origin: United Kingdom
- No. of episodes: 6

Production
- Running time: 24 minutes
- Production company: Avalon Television

Original release
- Network: Channel 4
- Release: 20 October – 24 November 2006

Related
- Garth Marenghi's Darkplace

Man to Man with Dean Learner is a British comedy chat show that was first broadcast on Channel 4 on 20 October 2006 and released on DVD on 3 September 2007. It features comedians Richard Ayoade and Matthew Holness.

Originally called Deano's After Dark, the show features Dean Learner (Ayoade) chatting to a range of guest characters (all played by Ayoade's co-writer, Matthew Holness) including horror writer Garth Marenghi.

== Production ==
Holness and Ayoade spent time testing out material in front of a live audience in December 2005, which laid the foundation for Man to Man; the show involved Ayoade fixed in the role of smut-peddling presenter Dean Learner and Holness playing various characters. These included Glynn Nimron, a sci-fi – or "S.F.", as he preferred it – actor with a new biography detailing his extremely close relationship with a director; Garth Marenghi, returning to promote his new Darkplace-esque movie War of the Wasps; folk musician Merriman Weir who has a penchant for rather dark songs (Holness is an adept guitarist); and another actor, Randolph Caer, who became a social pariah after starring in one of Dean's exploitation films (the Marenghi-penned slasher film Bitch Killer).

Bafta Nominated composer Andrew Hewitt, who scored Darkplace, also scored sections of Man to Man.

An amount of the humour stems from Learner's dubious business activities and anachronistically androcentric tendencies – with Finnish model Satu Suominen (as his 'beautiful assistant-cum-bartender') being the target of many of his jibes, and most of the guests having some sort of business connection to Learner which is sometimes declared upfront and sometimes revealed in the course of the episode.

== Episodes ==
=== Garth Marenghi ===
- Original Transmission Date: 20 October 2006

Marenghi discusses his humorous side and how it caused him to lose an ear, his latest movie War of the Wasps which turns out to be an allegory for a future war with the Dutch, and his new interest in painting having already done one exhibition and currently working on another. Many elements of the Marenghi character bear similarities to fiction author Harlan Ellison. Dean Learner goes into his first of several tirades. This initial one is about philosophy and having to queue for the restroom.

=== Steve Pising ===
- Original Transmission Date: 27 October 2006

Steve 'The Accelerator' Pising (pronounced 'pissing') is known to his public as former four time Formula Five Motor Racing World Champion. He is hospitalised in the early 1990s after a horrific accident due to mysterious brake failure, which ended his motor racing career. In this episode of Man to Man, we learn of Steve's love of camels and his hatred of his brother Barry. We also get a sneak peek at Dean's new reality show with Steve called The Learner. Dean has a short rant here, in which he shares his appreciation of wet wipes with Steve. Pising has many similarities to British F1 champion Nigel Mansell.

=== Glynn Nimron ===
- Original Transmission Date: 3 November 2006

Glynn Nimron is a true legend in his field; in this case, episodic futuristic law enforcement television drama series of the mid-1970s. A pioneering half-Hawaiian actor most famous for his role as 'Bot' in the classic Sci-Fi series Galacticops, Glynn will be celebrating the release of his 3000th film, Space Bandits From Pluto and their Pirate Pals, later this year. Nimron has many similarities to Star Trek actor Leonard Nimoy and speaks with a voice reminiscent of George Takei and Kryten from the British comedy series Red Dwarf.

=== Merriman Weir ===
- Original Transmission Date: 10 November 2006

Merriman Weir is a legendary folk guitarist famed for classic songs of melancholy and regret. This is Weir's first television appearance in a 30-year career and follows his much publicised bar-fight with James Blunt at this year's Big Chill festival. Don't miss this rare and classic acoustic set (this last instruction has also been forwarded to Merriman).

=== Amir Chanan ===
- Original Transmission Date: 17 November 2006

Amir Chanan is a self-confessed 'Master of the Psychic Arts'. Rediscovered by a new generation of fans after his classic 'Mind Fondle' appears on Richard and Judy, Amir talks to Dean about conspiracy theories, comfort feeding, mind control for the under fives and his bath-time therapy for the dispossessed. Chanan has many similarities to Israeli psychic Uri Geller.

=== Randolph Caer ===
- Original Transmission Date: 24 November 2006

The underrated character actor Randolph Caer grants his first television interview in 28 years following his traumatic 'live' mauling by TV's Lennard Ritter. Celebrated for his groundbreaking performances in films such as Bitch Killer, Pew! What A Scorcher! and That Duck! 2: (Duck on the Run), Randolph appears exclusively on Man to Man for a birthday celebration special.

Due to the death of Caer shortly before the programme's transmission, all guests from the previous five episodes (except Merriman Weir) were invited on to pay their respects. Over the course of the episode it is apparent that many of these guests, and Dean himself, bear some responsibility for Caer's downward spiral, which began after Caer became a social pariah due to his role in Bitch Killer. Caer's career slide is similar to that of respected British director Michael Powell whose career never fully recovered from the critical mauling it received for Peeping Tom (1960), a serial killer film loathed at the time by the press but which now is regarded by many, including Martin Scorsese, as a seminal masterpiece.
