= Liam Howe =

English musician (born 1974)

- Born: Liam Coverdale Howe; 29 September 1974 (age 52)
- Origin: Elwick, Hartlepool, England
- Genres: Electronic; trip hop; indie pop; house
- Occupations: Producer, engineer, programmer, songwriter, multi-instrumentalist
- Instruments: Synthesizer, guitar, bass, programming, string arrangement
- Years active: 1991–present
- Labels: One Little Indian; Tommy Boy; Unfall Productions
- Website: Liam Howe on Twitter Liam Howe on Instagram

Liam Coverdale Howe (born 29 September 1974) is an English record producer, musician and songwriter. Since co-founding electronic music band Sneaker Pimps in 1996, he has been a producer for Lana Del Rey, Marina and the Diamonds, FKA Twigs, Ellie Goulding, and Tom Vek.

== Career ==
=== Musical beginnings ===
In 1992, after numerous indie attempts to create music, he formed the dance act F.R.I.S.K. with fellow Northerner and childhood friend Chris Corner, and released the white label The Soul of Indiscretion EP. This was self-funded and a recorded number of 1,500 were pressed. The act was subsequently signed to Clean-up records, a subsidiary of One Little Indian Records.

Whilst studying fine art at Reading University, Howe formed the production company Line of Flight with Corner and other art students Joe Wilson and David Westlake. They released The World as a Cone EP under this title in 1994. Line of Flight produced many of the acts on Clean-up records and contributed numerous remixes to the 1990s dance scene. This exposure led to a deal with them to release an album, which was undertaken by their new and upcoming output teased as Sneaker Pimps.

=== Sneaker Pimps ===
Wanting a bigger audience, Howe and Corner began writing for a more song-based project. Ian Pickering, a lifelong friend of Howe's, joined the writing team as a lyricist. With an album of material written, singer Kelli Dayton (who had been introduced to Howe and Corner through Derek Birkett of One Little Indian) was invited to sing, and the band Sneaker Pimps was then formed. The debut album, Becoming X, was recorded entirely in Howe's father's house in Elwick, a small village on the outskirts of Hartlepool. Howe and Corner produced the record under the Line of Flight umbrella, with contributions from producers Jim Abbiss and Flood.

A further three albums were released after Becoming X; Splinter, Bloodsport and Squaring The Circle, along with a multitude of singles and EP's. Howe also played live keyboards with Sneaker Pimps on three out of their four albums, to date.

=== Ape Mink Press (AMP) ===
Having produced for other artists and making a return to Sneaker Pimps, this inspired Howe to make a reprisal to producing his own content under the name Ape Mink Press.

Ape Mink Press, otherwise known and cited as 'AMP' on releases, is a solo venture from Liam Howe. It originally started as a secret entrance into the Sneaker Pimps comeback in 2021, in which they released their fourth solo album, Squaring The Circle. The plan being, that sources would drop information or content through the Ape Mink Press name - which is actually a direct anagram of Sneaker Pimps, but this was slowly faded into silence, until several singles for the Squaring The Circle album were released and remixes from the then-mysterious AMP were teased and eventually made available. Howe, who then made it clear from numerous online interviews and press notes for the remixes, that this was not only a secret alias from himself for producing music, but a full-fledged solo project. He later hinted that not only would there be more remixes for the album, but there would be a whole new album of his own work, released under the AMP title, in 2022.

So far, there have been two Sneaker Pimps EPs with remixes provided by AMP and there will be a remix for every track on the Squaring The Circle album. This isn't the first time that an alias has been used by Howe, as there was previously Line of Flight, F.R.I.S.K., and the Zip with Ultrafox.

=== Branching out ===
Through the success of Sneaker Pimps, Howe's writing and production skills gained international recognition with hits such as "6 Underground" and "Spin Spin Sugar", which led to collaborations with artists such as Marilyn Manson, Placebo, Echo & the Bunnymen, Natalie Imbruglia, Nerina Pallot, and Emilíana Torrini.

Howe and Wilson then formed the band Ultrafox in 2001, with the German twins Claudia and Connie Holzer. Ice Skating was released on User Friendly Records and featured contributions from Sneaker Pimps' Chris Corner and Dave Westlake.

Howe, Corner and Pickering had written a fourth Sneaker Pimps album, but it remained unreleased. Demos of it leaked circa 2005. There were further demos leaked for a newly planned Sneaker Pimps album, but that was delayed until 2021. Demos of this also leaked circa 2006. Corner relocated to Berlin with the success of his solo project IAMX, whilst Howe stayed in the UK to further his writing/production career. The pair reunited in 2013, with Howe contributing synthesizer and recorder parts to the fifth IAMX album The Unified Field. Then, in 2021, Sneaker Pimps released their fourth album, Squaring The Circle.

=== Production and writing with other artists ===
Since Sneaker Pimps, Howe has written and produced for a whole host of respected artists including Foxes, Lana Del Rey, Ellie Goulding, Marina Diamandis, Tom Vek, Jessie Ware, Mikky Ekko, Adele, FKA Twigs, Say Lou Lou and Paul Buchanan of The Blue Nile.

In 2008 and 2009, Howe worked extensively on Marina Diamandis' debut album The Family Jewels co-writing and/or producing the majority of tracks. The album entered the UK charts on its week of release at No. 5. He also worked with Diamandis on her follow-up album, Electra Heart, in 2011. The album entered the UK charts on its week of release at No. 1.

In 2010, Howe produced CocknBullKid's debut album Adulthood on Island Records, including the co-writes "Yellow" and "The Hoarder", with Hannah Robinson and "Mexico" with Gonzales. Also in 2010, the track "Little Dreams" was released on the Ellie Goulding reissue Bright Lights. The song was co-written and produced by Howe.

In the summer of 2010 Howe, along with others, produced Tom Vek's much anticipated second album Leisure Seizure.

In 2011, Howe wrote several songs with Lana Del Rey and other collaborators such as Guy Chambers for her debut album Born to Die. The track "Lolita", written with Hannah Robinson, features on the record.

2012 saw collaborations with Foxes for Shaking Heads, Night Glo and Talking to Ghosts, which were featured in her debut album Glorious released in 2014; Fallulah and old bandmate Chris Corner for IAMX. Howe also worked extensively with London Grammar on developing their debut album.

In 2013, Howe co-produced FKA Twigs' first and second EP and contributed to her debut LP. He was also behind tracks from VV Brown and Fallulah, and Dan Croll.

2014 saw contributions to Jessie Ware, Sampha, Kovaks, Sonia Stein, and Simonne Jones.

In 2015, Howe worked with Maxine Ashley, Jam City, Natalie Duncan, Aluna George and the Kanye West signed artist Kacy Hill.

2016 brought collaborations with TsarB, Rob Bravery, Kyla La Grange and Hannah Peel.

In 2017/18, Howe worked with Lissie, Jessie Ware, Nilüfer Yanya, Aurora, and BEA1991.

The 2019 Sarasara LP Orgone on One Little Indian was written and produced in collaboration with the artist.

In 2020, Howe collaborated with Conor O'Brien from the band Villagers, Gillian Maguire, Ben Romans, and Lees, along with much anticipated work for the new Sneaker Pimps album, with bandmate Chris Corner.

2021 brought Howe to produce the second album by the French duo Cats on Trees. This process was conducted entirely remotely due to the pandemic. Also over lock-down, Howe worked with American band Paragon Cause. Howe has co-written and co-produced for Lees, with Eg White. The first single was "Honeymoon Suite". The majority of 2021 was taken up with finishing the then-pending Sneaker Pimps record.

Later, in 2021, Sneaker Pimps released their long-awaited fourth studio album Squaring The Circle. The writing credits are true to the three original writers: Chris Corner, Liam Howe and Ian Pickering. The release was some 18 years after their last record Bloodsport. They enrolled Simonne Jones as co-vocalist. The song Fighter was the first single to be released featuring vocals from Simonne.

Swiftly after the release of Squaring The Circle, Howe's own personal art project Ape Mink Press (also known as AMP) came to the surface in the form of remixes and reworks of some of the Squaring The Circle tracks. It is rumoured that there are AMP remixes of the entire record and these may well be released at some point.

Ape Mink Press has an album in production, which will be releasing in 2022.

=== Film ===
Howe's compositions have appeared in many films, most notably The Saint, Danny Boyle's A Life Less Ordinary and Alfonso Cuarón's Y tu mamá también. In 2009, he composed the soundtrack to the Sundance multi award-winning film Obselidia, using an orchestra of obsolete instruments. Howe has directed music videos for both Sneaker Pimps, and the electronic act, Motor. As a visual artist, Howe has exhibited installations in galleries such as London's Institute of Contemporary Arts and the CCA Glasgow. 2015 saw the release of Howe's second major film score to Bleeding Heart which starred Jessica Biel and Zosia Mamet and was directed by Diane Bell. The film premiered at the Tribeca Film Festival on 16 April 2015. Diane Bell's 3rd Film Of Dust and Bones also has an original score composed by Howe.

== Personal life ==
Howe's Sneaker Pimps bandmate Chris Corner has suggested that Howe has "deep neurodiversity".

== Discography ==
- 2023 BEA1991 – Peachy Free (BE.AWORLD) inc. writing
- 2023 Gia Ford – Alligator (Chrysalis Records) inc. writing
- 2021 Sneaker Pimps – Squaring The Circle (Unfall Productions) inc. writing
- 2021 Kelli Ali - Ghostdriver (Kelli Ali Music)
- 2020 Jam City – Pillowland (Earthly Records)
- 2019 Kyla La Grange – Comfort in Chaos (Sony Music)
- 2019 Sarasara – Orgone (One Little Indian) inc. writing
- 2019 BEA1991 – Did You Feel Me Slip Away? (BEA1991 self-released) inc. writing
- 2018 Elli Ingram – Sad Girl (Island Records) inc. writing
- 2018 Kovacs – Cheap Smell (Warner Music Group) inc. writing
- 2017 KillJ – Moonsick (Nettwerk) inc. writing
- 2017 KillJ – Dead Weight Solidier (Nettwerk) inc. writing
- 2017 KillJ – Silver Spoon (Nettwerk) inc. writing
- 2017 Jessie Ware – True Believers (PMR Records / Island Records) inc. writing
- 2017 Nilüfer Yanya – Sliding Doors (Blue Flowers Music) inc. writing
- 2017 Lissie – Boyfriend (Lionboy) inc. writing
- 2017 Kovacs – Sugar Pill (Warner Music Group) inc. writing
- 2017 Maxine Ashley – Paranoid EP (Maxine Ashley self-released) inc. writing
- 2016 Tsar B – Tsar B EP (Disco Naïveté)
- 2016 Rob Bravery – You Take Half (Sony Music)
- 2016 Hannah Peel – Awake but Always Dreaming (My Own Pleasure)
- 2016 Kyla La Grange – Justify (Sony Music)
- 2016 Sonia Stein – One of those Things (Marathon Records) inc. writing
- 2015 Foxes – All I Need (Epic Records) inc. writing
- 2015 Belgrave – Echoes EP (Just Off Pop) inc. writing
- 2015 Fallulah – Perfect Tense (Orchard) inc. writing
- 2015 Wild Palms – Rainmaking (One Little Indian) inc. writing
- 2015 Natalie Duncan – Black and White (Harvest Records) inc. writing
- 2014 Jam City – Dream a Garden (Night Slugs)
- 2014 Shivum Sharma – All These Years (National Anthem)
- 2014 Sonia Stein – Symbol (Harvest Records) inc. writing
- 2014 Sonia Stein – Chaos (Harvest Records) inc. writing
- 2014 Laura Welsh – Soft Control (Outsiders / Polydor) inc. writing
- 2014 Sonia Stein – Friendly Ghost (Harvest Records) inc. writing
- 2014 Sonia Stein – Demented Mind (Harvest Records) inc. writing
- 2014 Foxes – Glorious (Sony Music) inc. writing
- 2014 Dan Croll – Sweet Disarray (Deram Records) inc. writing
- 2014 Say Lou Lou – Lucid Dreaming (à Deux) inc. writing
- 2014 Hannah Peel – Fabric State (My Own Pleasure)
- 2013 FKA twigs – EP2 (Young Turks)
- 2013 FKA twigs – EP1 (Young Turks) inc. writing
- 2013 VV Brown – Samson & Delilah (YOY Records) inc. writing
- 2013 Fallulah – Escapism (Sony Music) inc. writing
- 2012 IAMX – The Unified Field (PledgeMusic)
- 2012 Marina and the Diamonds – Electra Heart (679 Artists / Atlantic Records) inc. writing
- 2012 Lana Del Rey – Born to Die (Interscope) inc. writing
- 2011 Tom Vek – Leisure Seizure (Island Records)
- 2011 CocknBullKid – Adulthood (Island Records) inc. writing
- 2011 Ellie Goulding – Bright Lights (Polydor)
- 2011 Sophie Ellis-Bextor – Make a Scene (EBGB's) inc. writing
- 2010 Cathy Davey – The Nameless (Hammer Toe Records)
- 2010 Marina and the Diamonds – The Family Jewels (679 Artists / Atlantic Records) inc. writing
- 2008 The Whip – X Marks Destination (Southern Fried Records)
- 2008 Adele – 19 (XL Recordings)
- 2007 Cathy Davey – Tales of Silversleeve (Parlophone)
- 2007 Sophie Ellis-Bextor – Trip the Light Fantastic (Fascination) inc. writing
- 2006 Grandadbob – Garden of Happiness (Southern Fried Records)
- 2006 IAMX – The Alternative (Major Records) inc. writing
- 2005 Emilíana Torrini – Fisherman's Woman (Rough Trade) inc. writing
- 2004 Ultrafox – Ice Skating (Loser Friendly) inc. writing
- 2002 Sneaker Pimps – Bloodsport (Tommy Boy) inc. writing
- 2001 Natalie Imbruglia – Cold Air (RCA Records) inc. writing
- 1999 Kristen Barry – Ordinary Life (Virgin Records)
- 1999 Sneaker Pimps – Splinter (Clean-up) inc. writing
- 1997 Marilyn Manson – Long Hard Road Out of Hell (Interscope)
- 1996 Sneaker Pimps – Becoming X (Clean-up) inc. writing
- 1994 Line of Flight – The World as a Cone EP (Clean-up) inc. writing
- 1993 F.R.I.S.K. – The Soul of Indiscretion (F.R.I.S.K. self-released) inc. writing

== Awards ==
Year	Nominated work	Award	Result	Ref.
ASCAP Songwriting Award	6 Underground (with Chris Corner and Ian Pickering)	ASCAP Songwriting Award	Won	
