= Sarasara =

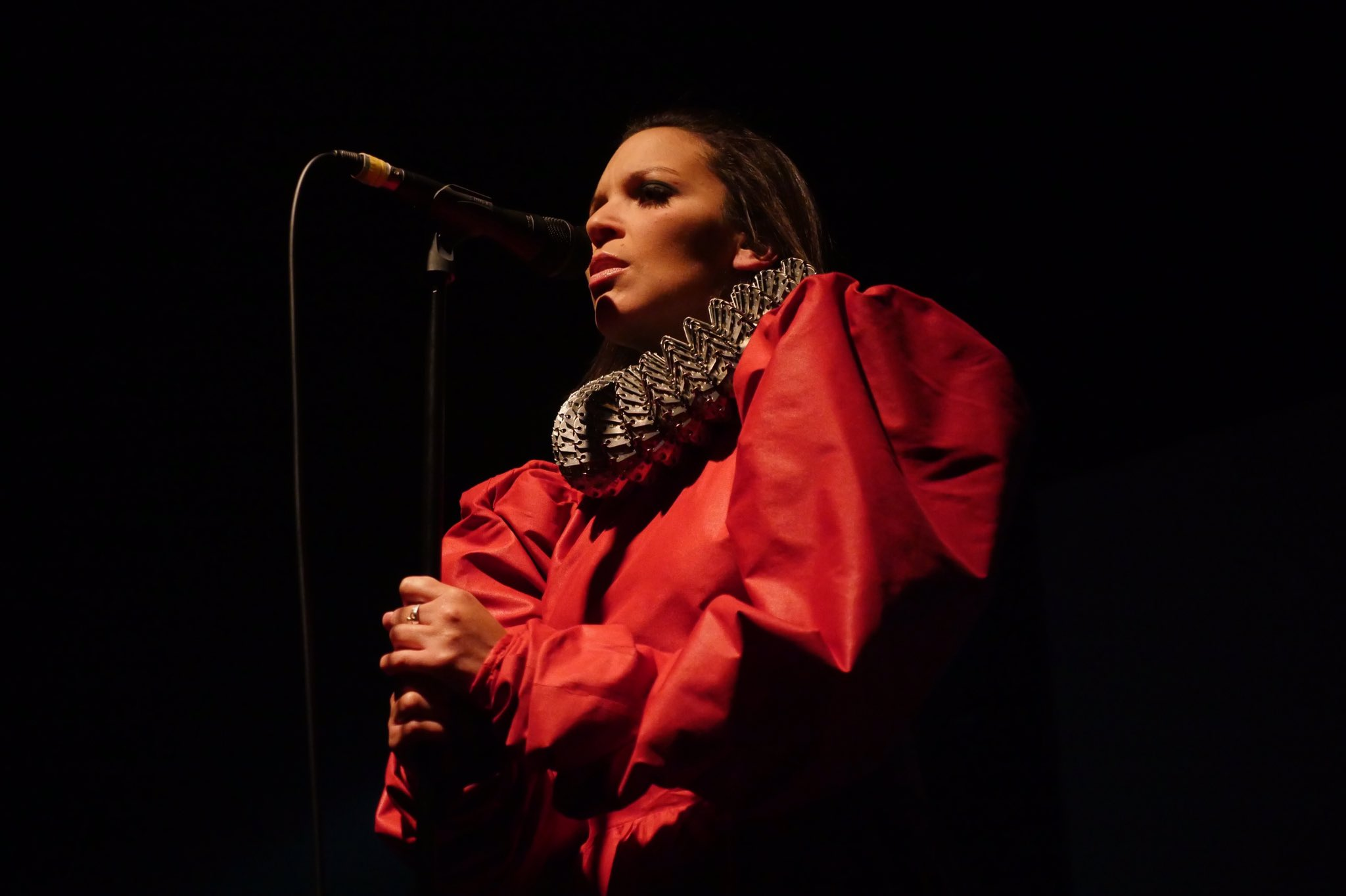
- Sarasara performing at Printemps de Bourges festival in France in 2017

Background information
- Born: Sarah Filleur; Fourmies, Nord, France
- Genres: Avant-pop; avant-garde; trip hop; electronic
- Occupations: Singer, songwriter, record producer, DJ, filmmaker
- Instruments: Vocals, keyboards
- Years active: 2016–present
- Label: One Little Indian
- Website: sarasara.online

Sarasara is a French singer, songwriter, electronic musician and record producer. Born in Fourmies, Nord, she began her music career in 2014. Following the success of her self-released David Bowie cover "Heroes", Sarasara moved to the UK to work on her first extended play (EP) in collaboration with Matthew Herbert. The EP drew the attention of Björk's label One Little Indian, who signed Sarasara in January 2016.

Sarasara subsequently released her debut studio album, Amor Fati in November 2016 to critical acclaim, being featured in The Guardian's Future 50 rising music stars to look out for, Clash magazine, Rolling Stone and Tsugi.

Her work has been likened to Björk and Aphex Twin, drawing on various genres including electronic music, trip hop, industrial and avant-garde.

== Life and career ==
=== Early life and career beginnings ===
Sarah Filleur was born in Fourmies, Nord. Before pursuing a career in music, she studied philosophy, a discipline that would later have a lasting influence on her artistic work and the themes explored in her music.

Although she studied piano and singing from an early age, it was not until 2014 that she began developing a personal musical project. Influenced by the Belgian electronic music scene and artists such as Björk, she became involved in DJing and music production, creating her first compositions using programmed beats and vocal samples.

In 2015, she self-released a cover of David Bowie's "Heroes". The success of the release encouraged her to begin writing her own songs. Later that year, she contacted British electronic musician Matthew Herbert with a series of self-produced demos. Impressed by her distinctive talent, Herbert agreed to collaborate on the production of her first EP, which attracted the attention of the label One Little Indian. In January 2016, One Little Indian's managing director Derek Birkett signed her to the label.

=== 2016–2018: Amor Fati ===
Sarasara's debut studio album, Amor Fati, was released on 11 November 2016. The title was inspired by Nietzsche's philosophy, and in particular his philosophical novel Thus Spoke Zarathustra. Amor Fati can be translated as “love of fate” or “love of one’s fate”. To Sarasara, Amor Fati represents going beyond simply accepting one's fate. It is about wanting to make one's own fate: reaching for it and attracting it. In an interview for The 405, an online magazine, the singer explained that "in order to change one’s fate, one has to work instinctively – finding the will to power in their consciousness by listening to their body".

The debut album featured four singles: Euphoria, Supernova, Sun and Love, meeting with significant critical acclaim. The Guardian profiled Sarasara for its "New Band of the Week" feature, describing her as "... all cute breathy vocal-sighs and crashing dissonance, her music is what might have happened had Petite Meller signed to 90s Warp, or the next (il)logical step after the likes of FKA twigs, Kelela and SZA: a sort of industrial-strength R&B; Aaliyah meets Aphex Twin". She was subsequently featured as one of The Guardian's Future 50 Rising Stars, and the album received a rating of 8/10 from Clash (magazine). The release of Amor Fati was accompanied by an international tour, featuring shows in Paris, London, Copenhagen, Amsterdam, Los Angeles, New York, and music-industry festivals such as The Great Escape Festival, Printemps de Bourges, MaMa Paris and South by South West (including the SXSW Hackathon) in Austin.

==== Imagery ====
Sarasara worked closely in the digital imagery for Amor Fati. Her cinematic ambitions were shaped by artists such as David Lynch, Stanley Kubrick, Maya Daren, Alfred Hitchcock, Quentin Tarantino, and Robert Rodriguez. The album's artwork was produced in collaboration with British photographer and artist Alva Bernadine, drawing inspiration from his series "Succubus". Sarasara's passion and love of antique sculptures drew her to Bernadine, renowned for his background in fashion and the playfulness with which his work portrays the female body.

The video for Euphoria emerged in collaboration with Israeli film animator Leopold Amitay. It features a 2D animation based on Sarasara's face and illustrative of her character, inspired by photographer Richard Avedon's famous portrait of Audrey Hepburn and the popular Greek mythological creature Medusa.

The video for Sun was shot in collaboration with Belgian filmmaker Gust Van den Berghe (Little Baby Jesus of Flandr, Blue Bird, Lucifer) on a prototype camera called a Tondoscope. The camera was invented by Van den Berghe for his film "Lucifer", and incorporates the lens within a glass tube so as to capture images in 360 degree, producing a circular canvas.

The video for Love was directed, shot and edited by Sarasara in collaboration with British filmmaker Nikolai Galitzine Yurievitch (Iris, Dear Child, From the Mountain).

==== Further releases ====
Exactly one year after her release of Amor Fati, Sarasara released Amor Fati: The A Cappella Album, a recomposition of the album in collaboration with French vocal performers. Recorded in the Sculpture Chamber of the Palais des Beaux-Arts de Lille, the album includes multiple influences such as gospel, soul, rap, opera and beatbox. Amor Fati was further released as a Remixes EP, featuring remixes from Matthew Herbert, Susso, Crewdson and Earth is Flat. A deluxe version was released in March 2018.

=== 2019–2020: Orgone ===
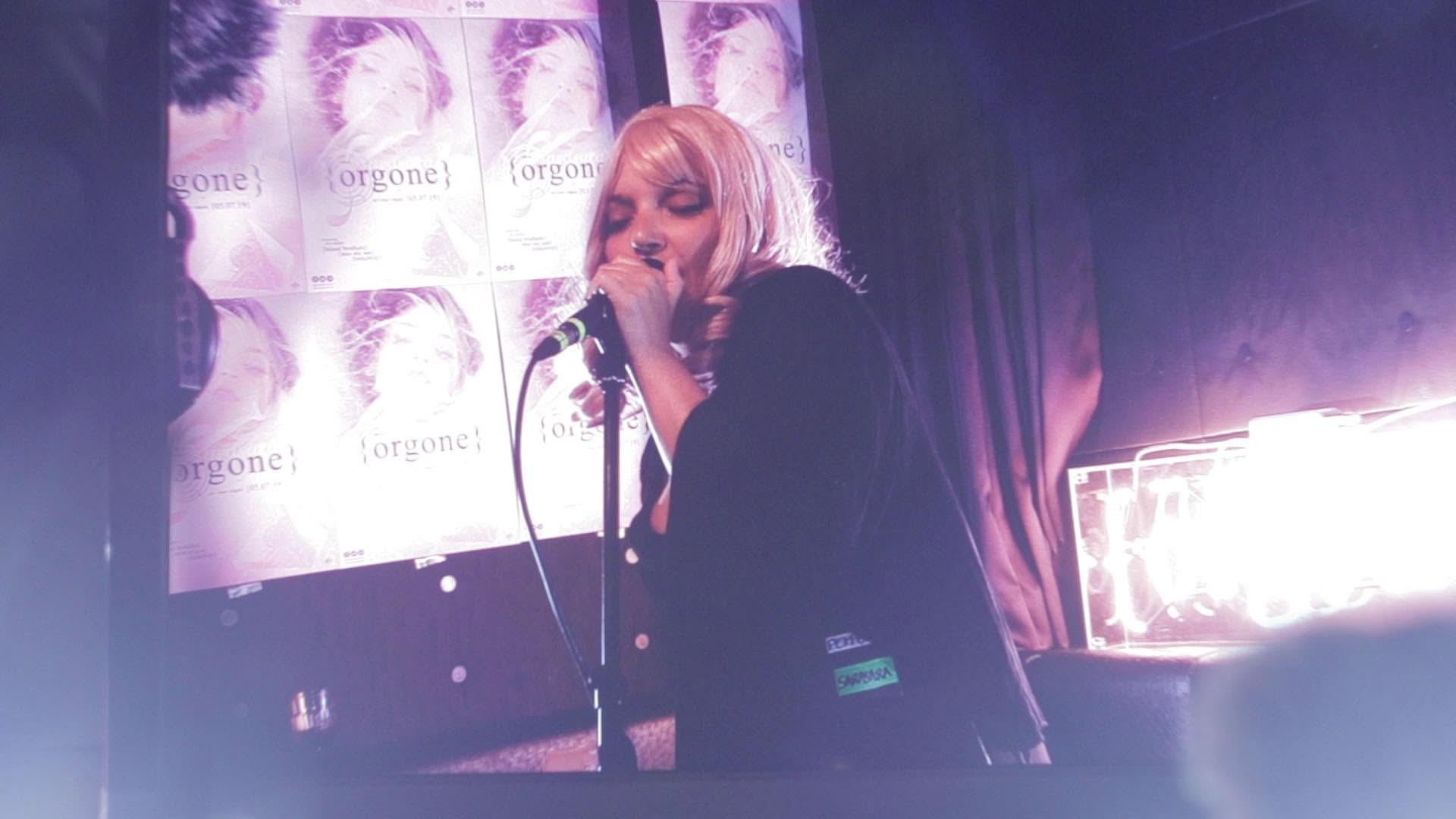
Sarasara performing at Dommune in Tokyo, Japan

Following the success of her debut studio release, Sarasara released her much anticipated second album, Orgone with One Little Indian Records on 5 July 2019. Produced in collaboration with Sneaker Pimps label-mate Liam Howe, Orgone was Sarasara's first album in French, her mother tongue. The album features four singles: Blood Brothers, Into Me See, Ego Trip and Tinkertoy feat. Peter Doherty. It has been met with widespread critical acclaim across the globe, being featured in Marie Claire Magazine, NME, Rolling Stone and the New York Times Magazine.

Orgone reflects Sarasara's growth as an artist. Taking three years to complete, it was an intimately personal record that tells several stories:

- of her whirlwind entrance into the music industry
- of her being tossed around between two cycles, two careers, two homes and two countries
- of the process of rebuilding after the end of karmic relationships and of falling in love again
- of finding her way on a spiritual path, connecting with God, and learning the virtues of vulnerability, self-love, acceptance and surrendering to what is and being true to oneself
- of her taking responsibility for what she is putting into the universe, reclaiming her creative power, and, ultimately, becoming a better version of herself

In May 2020, Sarasara was featured in the Visual Collaborative electronic catalog under the Amplified series, where she was interviewed alongside other creatives from around the world. The album toured globally, with dates across the US, Japan, South Korea, Germany, France, Italy, Spain, Belgium and the UK.

Orgone was further released as a Remixes EP, featuring remixes from Liam Howe, Howie B, Hannah Peel, Mololoc, Michael Forzza and Dimitri Andreas.

=== 2021–present: Elixir, Elixir – La Suite and acoustic performances ===
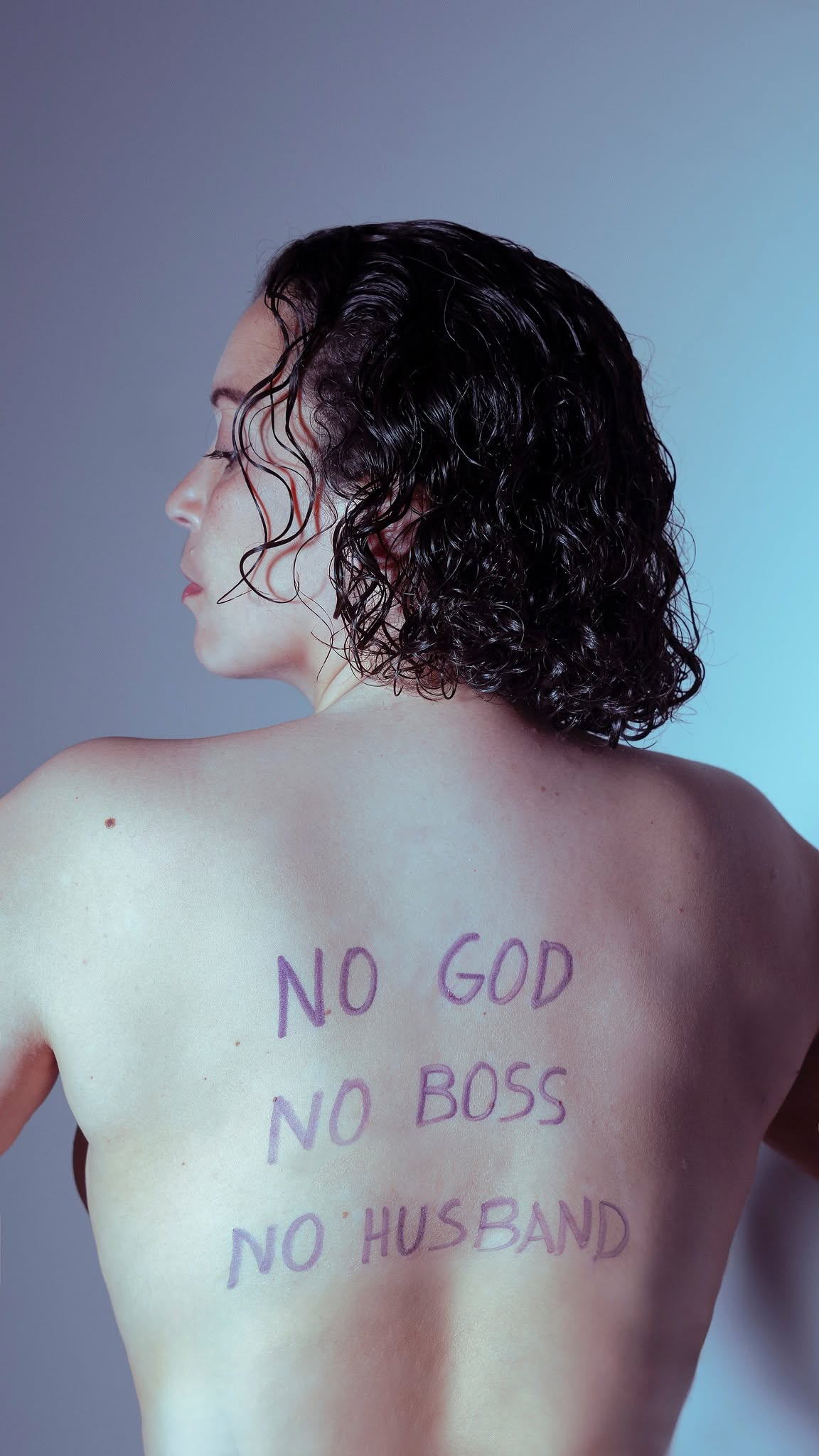
Elixir artwork

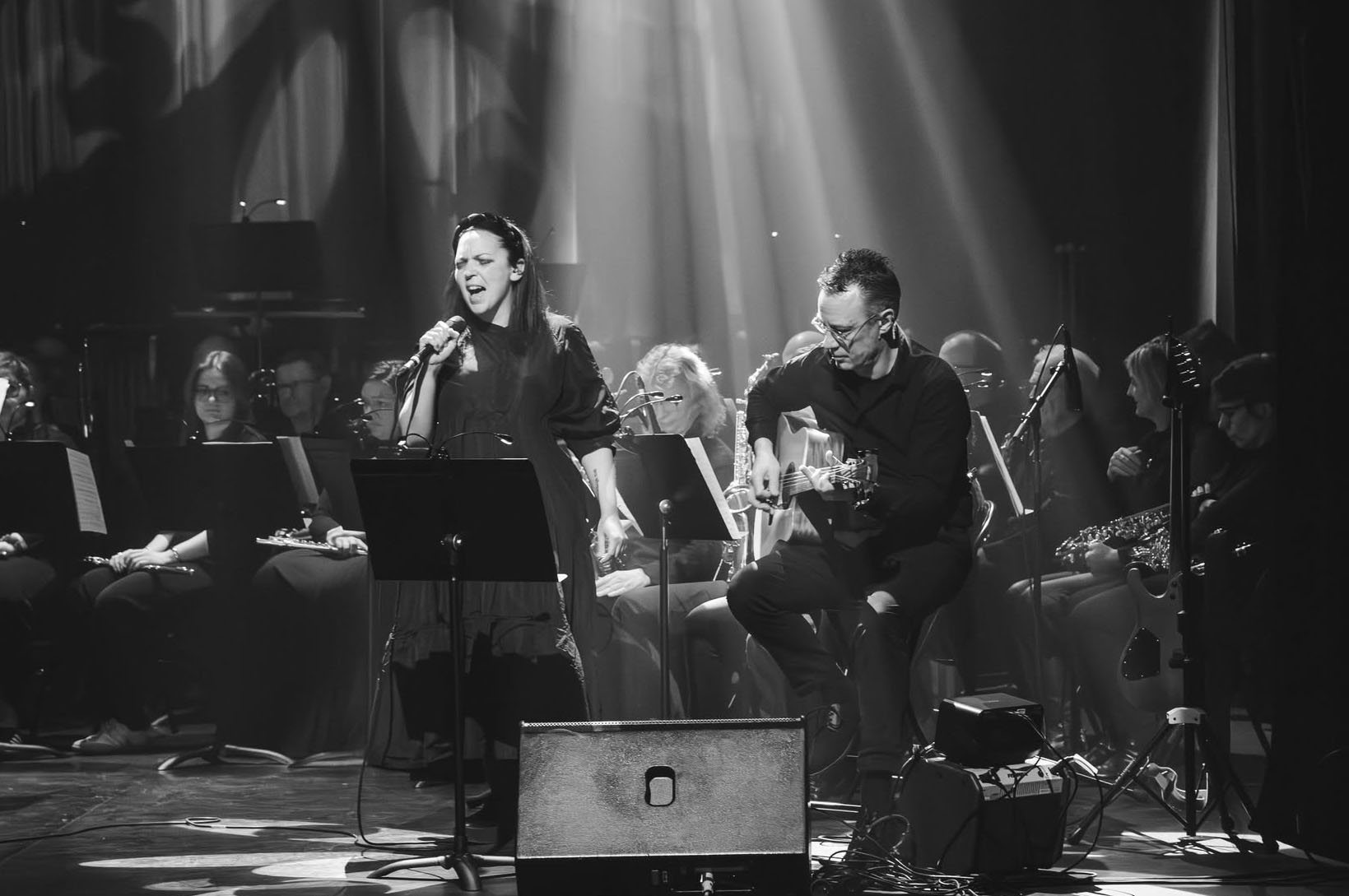
Sarasara performing with orchestra at Théâtre Jean Ferrat in Fourmies, France

Following the release of Orgone in 2019, Sarasara began work on her third studio album, Elixir, writing material between Ibiza, Spain, and Brighton, England. Recorded in Hackney, London, the album was co-produced by Sarasara and British producer Liam Howe, continuing their collaboration following Orgone.

Released on 1 March 2024 through One Little Independent Records, Elixir marked Sarasara's return to the album format following the EP Sarasara x Serge Gainsbourg (2022). The album explores themes of transformation, healing, resilience and self-discovery, combining electronic, industrial and avant-pop influences.

On 11 October 2024, Sarasara released the EP Elixir, La Suite through One Little Independent Records. The release featured the previously unreleased tracks "Fade to Black" and "Love Is the Key", alongside instrumental versions of both recordings.

A live acoustic reinterpretation of the album, Elixir (Guitare & Voix), followed on 2 April 2025. The project re-arranged material from Elixir for voice and acoustic guitar and was released by One Little Independent Records.

In 2026, Sarasara further expanded the Elixir project through a new orchestral adaptation of the album's live show. The production premiered at the Théâtre Jean-Ferrat in Fourmies on 27 March 2026.

== Artistry ==
=== Music influences and style ===
Sarasara's music combines elements of electronic music, trip hop, techno, industrial music and avant-garde pop. Critics have compared aspects of her work to Björk and Aphex Twin.

In a 2020 interview with The White Room, Sarasara identified Björk, Depeche Mode, Nine Inch Nails, Massive Attack and Portishead as her principal musical influences, citing their ability to create immersive musical worlds and distinctive artistic identities. Her work has also drawn inspiration from techno artists such as Richie Hawtin and Ricardo Villalobos, whose minimalist and experimental approaches to electronic music informed her early development as a DJ and producer. Influences from hip hop groups including Wu-Tang Clan and Cypress Hill have likewise contributed to the eclectic character of her musical background.

Her musical background includes classical vocal training and studies at a conservatory during childhood, as well as opera lessons during her teenage years, experiences that have informed her vocal technique and approach to composition. Reviewers have described her sound as blending organic and electronic elements. The Guardian characterised her music as "robotic: pitting African instruments against squelching, mutant machine beats". The Metropolist described her as "an artist to watch closely", citing her use of technology to explore the complexities of contemporary life.

=== Philosophy and spirituality ===
Philosophy and spirituality play an important role in Sarasara's work. Reflections on existence, freedom and fate are recurring themes throughout her music. Among her principal influences are Epicurus, Lucretius, Nietzsche and Carl Jung.

Her interest in philosophy also led her to explore Eastern spiritual traditions, particularly Kriya Yoga. She has frequently cited Paramahansa Yogananda's Autobiography of a Yogi among the books that have shaped her personal and artistic journey.

== Discography ==
=== Albums ===
- Amor Fati (2016)
- Amor Fati: The A Cappella Album (2017)
- Orgone (2019)
- Musica Universalis, Live from Real World Studios (2023)
- Elixir (2024)
- Elixir (Guitare & Voix) (2025)

=== EPs ===
- Orgonum: The Remixes (2019)
- Sarasara x Serge Gainsbourg (2022)
- Elixir, La Suite (2024)

=== Remixes ===
- Hannah Peel – "Particule D2" (Sarasara remix) from Particle in Space EP (2018)
- Crass – "Asylum" (Sarasara remix) from Normal Never Was and The Feeding of the Five Thousand Remixes (2020)

=== Featurings ===
- Ghostpoet – "This trainwreck of a life" from I Grow Tired But Dare Not Fall Asleep (2020)
- Ghostpoet – "Social lacerations" from I Grow Tired But Dare Not Fall Asleep (2020)
