= Splinter (Sneaker Pimps album) =

1999 album by Sneaker Pimps

Studio album by Sneaker Pimps
- Released: 25 October 1999
- Studios: Line of Flight, London
- Genres: Electronic; trip hop
- Length: 55:36
- Labels: Clean Up; Virgin; Cutting Edge
- Producer: Line of Flight

Sneaker Pimps chronology
Becoming Remixed (1998)	Splinter (1999)	Bloodsport (2002)

Singles from Splinter
- 1. "Low Five" Released: 9 August 1999; 2. "Ten to Twenty" Released: 18 October 1999

Splinter is the second studio album by English electronic band Sneaker Pimps, released on 25 October 1999 through record labels Clean Up and Virgin.

It was the first album to feature founding member and principal songwriter Chris Corner on lead vocals, replacing the band's previous singer Kelli Ali.

== Content ==
NME described Splinter as "a staunch refusal to cash in whatsoever on previous fame" and "the band's hangover after the long night of success brought by debut Becoming X. It’s faintly ugly and always a breath away from self-destruction, the vision of a band who've renounced smiling at people they hate and wrestled their collective soul back from the devil."

AllMusic described the album's musical style as "full of trancey, edgy psychedelia, interspersed with moments of blistering rock" and "an intricate album of trip-hop".

Songs recorded during the album sessions but not included on the album are "Diving" and "Unattach", which were included as bonus tracks on the Japanese edition and as B-sides on certain editions of the "Low Five" single, as well as "Virgin" and "Perfect One", B-sides to editions of the "Ten to Twenty" single.

== Release ==
Splinter was released on 29 October 1999 in the UK, Japan and Europe, through record labels Clean Up and Virgin. Splinter was not released in the United States, unlike the group's other two albums.

Two singles were released from the album: "Low Five" and "Ten to Twenty".

The album reached number 80 in the UK Albums Chart; the single "Low Five" reached number 39 on the UK Singles Chart, while "Ten to Twenty" reached number 56.

The band performed a live version of the album on Scottish TV show Boxed Set in 2000.

== Reception ==
Professional ratings
Review scores
Source	Rating
AllMusic	3/5 stars
NME	3.5/5 stars

NME was largely favourable towards the album, singling out Chris Corner's lyrics for praise: "His abstract punctuation-free lyrics have the same bleak power as OK Computer – strangely meaningful without saying anything", and calling Splinter "as compelling as it is claustrophobic". AllMusic, despite giving it a mediocre rating, described it as "a superb disc", "every bit as original as any of their contemporaries" as well as "pleasantly low-key and occasionally brilliant."

== Track listing ==
All tracks are written by Chris Corner, Liam Howe and Ian Pickering.

No.	Title	Length
1.	"Half Life"	4:53
2.	"Low Five"	4:35
3.	"Lightning Field"	4:11
4.	"Curl"	4:55
5.	"Destroying Angel"	4:26
6.	"Empathy"	3:42
7.	"Superbug"	4:27
8.	"Flowers and Silence"	5:47
9.	"Cute Sushi Lunches"	3:15
10.	"Ten to Twenty"	4:30
11.	"Splinter"	4:46
12.	"Wife by Two Thousand"	6:17
Total length:		55:44

Japanese edition bonus tracks
No.	Title	Length
13.	"Diving"	4:18
14.	"Unattach"	4:02
Total length:		64:04

== Samples ==
- "Half Life" sampled Scott Walker's track: "It's Raining Today" (1969)
- "Lightning Field" sampled Philip Glass's track: "Étoile Polaire (North Star)" (1977)
- "Empathy" sampled both Kronos Quartet's tracks: "Uleg-Khem" and "Laengdans Efter Byfans Mats" (1997) and Cabaret Voltaire's track: "Premonition" (1980)
- "Superbug" sampled Dashiell Hedayat's track: "Cielo Drive/17" (1971)
- "Flowers and Silence" sampled Scott Walker's track: "Big Louise" (1969)
- "Cute Sushi Lunches" sampled both David Sylvian's track: "Brilliant Trees" (1984) and Vangelis' track: "Beaubourg Part 1" (1978)

== Personnel ==
- Chris Corner – vocals, guitar, keyboards
- Liam Howe – keyboards, synths, programming, guitar, percussion
- Joe Wilson – guitars, bass
- David Westlake – drums, percussion
- Sarah McDonnell, Sue Denim – backing vocals
- Mark 'Spike' Stent – mixing
- Howie Weinberg – mastering
- Collier Schorr – photography
