= Russian Dolls: Sex Trade =

Belgian drama television series

- Also known as: Matrioshki; Matroesjka's; Matrёshki
- Written by: Marc Punt; Guy Goossens
- Directed by: Marc Punt; Guy Goossens
- Starring: Peter Van Den Begin; Axel Daeseleire; Luk Wyns
- Theme music composer: Sneaker Pimps
- Opening theme: Post-Modern Sleaze
- Composer: David Julyan
- Country of origin: Belgium
- Original language: Flemish
- No. of seasons: 2
- No. of episodes: 20

Production
- Producers: Marc Punt; Guy Goossens for Independent Film Productions

Original release
- Network: VTM

Russian Dolls: Sex Trade (Dutch: Matroesjka's, meaning Matryoshka doll, also known as Matrioshki or Matrёshki) is a Flemish drama television series about a group of women from Lithuania and Russia who are taken to Belgium by a gang involved in the sex trade to work as sex slaves. The series starts in Lithuania, where the girls are chosen and where they have to sign a contract in Greek, which they cannot understand. The gang, under the lead of Ray Van Mechelen, takes the girls to Cyprus and from there they are taken to Club 69 in Belgium to work. Russian Dolls is sponsored by the Flemish Audiovisual Fund (Vlaams Audiovisueel Fonds).

Russian Dolls is produced and directed by Guy Goossens and Marc Punt.

Because of explicit scenes of sex and violence, the program is not appropriate for people under 16 years of age (according to Dutch and Belgian ratings).

== General overview ==
Although based on the problems associated with the sex trade, the series is not so much a documentary or engaged criticism of those problems as it is a source of entertainment. However, director Marc Punt has said that it wouldn't be terrible if the series made people aware of those problems. Already, the series is used to warn women in the former Eastern Bloc of the practices associated with the sex trade.

The program was first broadcast on the Belgian channels Canal+ (now known as "Prime") and VTM. After ten episodes, Russian Dolls received a viewership in excess of 1.1 million. Other countries picked up the show as well. A deal was negotiated between VTM, Independent Productions, and several foreign commercial broadcasters to make a second season. The second season finished shooting in October 2007 and aired in Belgium in 2008. Thus far, the series has twenty episodes.

The British composer David Julyan provided the musical score for the series. The theme song is "Post-Modern Sleaze" by British group Sneaker Pimps. The song from Season 2 Episode 5 playing in Bulgaria is Tazi Vecher by Sonq Nemska.

A second season titled Matrioshki 2 was released in 2007 and continues to deal with human trafficking for prostitution in Europe. The series takes place three years after the first serial, when the traffickers from the first season are released from jail and go to Thailand. This time it deals not only with prostitution of eastern European girls, but also with trafficking of Asian girls brought back for prostitution in Europe, sometimes to help their families.

== International broadcasts ==
The first season can be seen in the following countries: Germany, Turkey, the Netherlands, the United Kingdom, France, Spain, Bosnia and Herzegovina, Italy, Finland, Sweden, Australia, Russia, Serbia, Brazil, Hungary, Poland, Lithuania, Latvia, Montenegro, Estonia, Albania and Chile. In Portugal it airs on Fox Crime. In Turkey and Italy the show airs on FX. In Mexico, the series airs on Once TV. The Film Zone shows the first ten episodes in some countries from Latin America.

== Cast ==
- Peter Van Den Begin - Raymond "Ray" van Mechelen; runs Studio 69.
- Eugenia Hirivskaya - Kalinka
- Axel Daeseleire - Jan Verplancke
- Tom Van Dyck - Vincent Dockx; became paralysed when Ray pushed him, after trying to make Kalinka give him a blowjob. At the end of the first season he died.
- Žemyna Ašmontaitė - Daria
- Indrė Jaraitė - Inesa
- Luk Wyns - Eddy Stoefs; the manager of Studio 69 and is very keen of his money.
- Veerle De Jonghe - Esther Van De Walle
- Lyudmila Lipner - Debora
- Ailika Kremer - Eva
- Lyubov Tolkalina - Olga
- Marc Van Eeghem - Marc Camps
- Stany Crets - Clem De Donder
- Lucas Van den Eynde - reporter Nico Maes
- Manou Kersting - Danny Bols
- Frank Aendenboom - John Dockx; father of Vincent and uncle to Ray. He appears to be the big boss of Studio 69.
- Natalya Reva - Inga
- Hilde Heijnen - Laura Keyser
- Svetlana Abolenkina - Luna
- Zorina Tanasova - Irina
- Vilma Raubaitė - Kasandra
- Saartje Vandendriessche - Sita
- Wim Opbrouck - Mike Simons
- Peter Thyssen - Rudi Sierens
- Eric Godon - Jean-Paul

The show has also included several guest roles Ludo Hellincx (Nelson Nilis), Karel Deruwe (officer), Jan Decleir (Wim Wilson's father), Chris Lomme (Monique Wilson), and Warre Borgmans (Dokter Van Looy).

== Episodes ==
=== Season 1 ===
No. overall	No. in season	Title	Original release date
1	1	"Episode 1"	January 5, 2005
Sex traffickers Ray Van Mechelen and Mark Camps organize "dance" auditions in Vilnius, Lithuania, claiming to be recruiting dancers. Kasandra is suspicious, but Daria wants to leave at all costs and signs the contract.
2	2	"Episode 2"	January 12, 2005
On Cyprus, the recruited dancers start to realize the true nature of the program. The gang of Van Mechelen forces the girls to strip and dance in a nightclub. Debora and Olga however manage to escape.
3	3	"Episode 3"	January 19, 2005
Esther has no other choice but to move in with Jan Verplancke. The Eastern European girls finally arrive in Studio 69, a nightclub in Antwerp, Belgium. Debora attacks one of the customers, so the gang decides to sell her.
4	4	"Episode 4"	January 26, 2005
The gang picks up Russian girl Inga, who has been brought to Belgium once before, to Kalinka's chagrin. Daria convinces Nico Maes to smuggle a letter. Debora refuses to have sex with her new owner and remains imprisoned.
5	5	"Episode 5"	February 2, 2005
The police organize a raid on Studio 69, but the gang was informed of this ahead of time. Kalinka and Inga are taken to the police station for interrogation.
6	6	"Episode 6"	February 9, 2005
Irina hides at the residence of Peter Jones. His wife is very upset about Irina's presence and calls the police.
7	7	"Episode 7"	February 16, 2005
The police are watching Studio 69, driving away the customers, and the gang has a lack of income. A customer falls in love with Eva.
8	8	"Episode 8"	February 23, 2005
Daria's savings are missing, and the other girls suspect Debora to be the thief. Wim Wilson buys Eva's contract. When Vincent abuses Kalinka, his conflict with Ray worsens.
9	9	"Episode 9"	March 2, 2005
Eva is too stubborn to file a complaint against the gang. Daria finds out that her best friend Kasandra was killed in Vilnius by Ray.
10	10	"Episode 10"	March 9, 2005
Vincent offers Ray a very unexpected proposition. Ray breaks up his relationship with Kalinka, who seeks revenge using her knowledge about the criminal activities.

=== Season 2 ===
No. overall	No. in season	Title	Original release date
11	1	"Episode 11"	April 11, 2008
Ray Van Mechelen and Eddy Stoefs are released from jail after three years and discover that Jan Verplancke took all their money and runs a strip bar in Thailand.
12	2	"Episode 12"	April 18, 2008
Two Russian girls, Nastya and Sveta, arrive in Belgium only to find out that all the glamorous promises were a lie.
13	3	"Episode 13"	April 25, 2008
Ray flies to Ukraine to buy new girls and impress Morozov, while Sveta manages to escape.
14	4	"Episode 14"	May 2, 2008
A murder occurs. Sels punishes Sveta for her attempted escape.
15	5	"Episode 15"	May 9, 2008
Alyona and Yana run away from Morozov. Thip and Pat escape from the farm.
16	6	"Episode 16"	May 16, 2008
Sels snaps when Morozov goes too far, while the police question Inesa.
17	7	"Episode 17"	May 23, 2008
Sels blames Jan for the debacle and demands he find 10 girls in 1 week.
18	8	"Episode 18"	May 30, 2008
Sels is dissatisfied with the girls Jan has brought back from Romania. Nastya gets punished by Eddy for refusing a customer. Esther gets arrested and discovers that Inesa is an informer.
19	9	"Episode 19"	June 6, 2008
Nastya attempts to escape, while Thip and Pat blackmail Eddie and Jan.
20	10	"Episode 20"	June 13, 2008
Nastya tries to get away from a gang, and pays for Dasha's treatment with Sels' money.
