= 6 Underground (song) =

1996 single by Sneaker Pimps

Single by Sneaker Pimps

from the album Becoming X
- B-side: "Can't Find My Way Home"; "Precious"
- Released: 30 September 1996
- Genre: Trip hop; alternative rock
- Length: 3:54
- Label: Clean Up
- Songwriters: John Barry; Chris Corner; Liam Howe; Ian Pickering
- Producers: Jim Abbiss; Line of Flight

Sneaker Pimps singles chronology
"Roll On" (1996)	"6 Underground" (1996)	"Spin Spin Sugar" (1997)

Audio sample
- file; help

Music video
- "6 Underground" on YouTube

"6 Underground" is a song by the English band Sneaker Pimps from their debut studio album, Becoming X (1996). First released as a single in the United Kingdom in September 1996 by Clean-up Records, the song reached number 15 on the UK Singles Chart and had moderate radio airplay in the United States, where it was shipped to modern rock and dance stations in February 1997. After the song was used in the 1997 American film The Saint, radio stations began playing "6 Underground" more frequently. The single was re-released in May 1997, when it peaked at number nine on the UK Singles Chart. In the United States, the song peaked at number 45 on the Billboard Hot 100 and at number seven on the Billboard Modern Rock Tracks chart. Both the song and the music video, directed by Toby Tremlett, feature Kelli Dayton (later known as Kelli Ali), the band's lead singer at the time.

The cover artwork of the single uses a photograph of a Lego Space moonscape. The piece is from the Command Centre playset marketed by The Lego Group from 1978 to 1988. After the commercial success and popularity of the album version of the song, the group released several remixes, some of which became hits in dance clubs and radio stations with a dance format. The most popular version was the remix by Nellee Hooper (which appeared as a hidden track on the album and was depicted in the music video).

== Composition ==
The horns and the harp melody at the beginning of the song are both sampled from "Golden Girl", a track from the 1964 James Bond film Goldfinger (the song plays during a scene when Bond discovers Jill Masterson covered in gold paint). The "a-one two" heard repeatedly in the Nellee Hooper version is sampled from De La Soul's song "Breakadawn".

Chris Corner said, "It's about death in a small town environment. You grow up in this shit town and you yearn to get out. A lot of artists, we just can't survive in a place like that. So, the essence of that song is that living in a small town is like dying. For us it was a huge release to get out and to explore the world, to see what everything else is about. We all wanted that. You know, the northern industrial shithole. And that's really what that song's about."

== Critical reception ==
In his review of the song, Simon Price from Melody Maker wrote, "Cliche of the year. Post-Portishead, post-Garbage. Girl singer. Polite trip hop and gentle junglism. Lamb. Moloko. Sneaker Pimps. The Stone Temple Pilots of The Bristol Sound, basically." In December 1996, Melody Maker ranked "6 Underground" number 30 in their list of "Singles of the Year", adding, "Smokier than Bill Hicks' bedroom, snakier than a python on a hairpin bend, a prime slice of easy sleaze that proved t**p h*p needn't be two dirty words." In 2017, Billboard ranked it number 48 in their list of "The 100 Greatest Pop Songs of 1997", writing, "Thank God for Nellee Hooper, the script doctor of '90s U.K. electronic pop, who stepped in to take the Sneaker Pimps' signature single to the next level — without him, there's no sticky Uh, one, two hook making an already captivating trip-hop ballad absolutely unshakeable."

== Music video ==
The music video for "6 Underground" was directed by Toby Tremlett and made its debut on 14 January 1997. It uses the "Nellee Hooper edit" of the song. Throughout the video, which gives off a dark atmosphere, the camera focuses on Kelli Dayton singing in the middle of a dark room sitting in a dentist chair that she spins around. The camera follows Dayton as she slowly walks around the darkened room singing the song. There are also several smaller lit rooms with oval windows within the larger dark room, depicting different scenes such as a man dressed in black practicing various poses, a woman dressed in a nightgown who is vacuuming the floor, a young woman posing around a chair in a red tie shirt and black skirt, a toddler dressed in a costume pouring spaghetti from a jar and tossing it around the room, and an overweight man eating spaghetti while sitting in a recliner. The small rooms with the oval windows could depict a view into people's private lives, and even a view into their souls. A can of worms is poured out by a band member. The other band members are usually seen lurking behind Dayton in this video, including in some scenes where the band is standing in one of the small, brightly lit rooms. At the end of the video, the people in the smaller rooms seem to freeze in place, and in the big room, the band poses at Dayton's dentist chair, and then the lights go out.

== Track listings ==
- UK CD single
1. "6 Underground" (Nellee Hoopers edit) – 3:54
2. "6 Underground" (album version) – 4:05
3. "Can't Find My Way Home" – 6:04
4. "Precious" – 4:18
- UK 12-inch single
1. "6 Underground" (Two Lone Swordsmen vocal mix) – 5:47
2. "6 Underground" (Nellee Hooper's dub) – 4:28
3. "6 Underground" (In the Jungle mix) – 7:58
4. "Can't Find My Way Home" – 6:07

== Charts ==
=== Weekly charts ===
1996 weekly chart performance for "6 Underground"
Chart (1996)	Peak position
Scottish Singles Sales (Official Charts)	17
UK Singles (Official Charts)	15
UK Airplay (Music Week)	37

1997 weekly chart performance for "6 Underground"
Chart (1997)	Peak position
Australia (ARIA)	62
Scottish Singles Sales (Official Charts)	11
UK Singles (Official Charts)	9
US Billboard Hot 100	45
US Adult Top 40	31
US Modern Rock Tracks	7

=== Year-end charts ===
Year-end chart performance for "6 Underground"
Chart (1997)	Position
US Modern Rock Tracks (Billboard)	15

== Certifications ==
Certifications and sales for "6 Underground"
Region	Certification	Certified units/sales
New Zealand (RMNZ)	Gold	15,000^{‡}
United Kingdom (BPI) Sales since 2013	Silver	200,000^{‡}
^{‡} Sales+streaming figures based on certification alone.

== Release history ==
Release dates and formats for "6 Underground"
Region	Date	Format(s)	Label(s)	Ref(s).
United Kingdom	30 September 1996	12-inch vinyl; CD	Clean Up	
United States	3 February 1997	Modern rock; dance; triple-A radio	Clean Up; Virgin	
United States	8 April 1997	Contemporary hit radio	Clean Up; Virgin	
United Kingdom (re-release)	26 May 1997	12-inch vinyl; CD	Clean Up	

== Usage in media ==
The song is featured at the beginning of the Beverly Hills, 90210 episode "Friends in Deed" from its eighth season. The song is used in 1997 film The Saint. A remix of the song—"Six Underground (The Umbrellas Of Ladywell Mix #2)"—is used in the 1998 teen film Can't Hardly Wait, when character Amanda Beckett (Jennifer Love Hewitt) first walks into the party. In 2000, the song was the main theme for the US primetime soap opera Titans. In 2024, the song was used in Kyle Mooney's comedy film Y2K. The song plays towards the end of Episode 7, Season 1 of The Testaments (2026). The first trailer for the 2026 film Ray Gunn used vocals from the song, albeit remixed.
