= Dave Westlake =

British musician and lyricist

- Born: David Westlake; 26 December 1970 (age 55)
- Origin: Newton Abbot, England
- Genres: Electronic; trip hop; pop
- Occupations: Musician, drummer
- Instruments: Drums, percussion, synthesizer
- Formerly of: Sneaker Pimps, Ultrafox, Trash Money, The Mighty Boosh
- Website: https://www.davidwestlakemusic.com/

Dave Westlake (born 26 December 1970) is a British musician and drummer, known most for his work with Sneaker Pimps and The Mighty Boosh. He has since moved on from performing and recording with Sneaker Pimps to joining fellow band mate Joe Wilson in the band Trash Money, and making music for film, media and sound samples.

== Career ==
Westlake first entered the music scene when asked to perform a live, one off gig with Liam Howe and Chris Corner's early entrance into the music scene as 'F.R.I.S.K.'. When they later formed Sneaker Pimps a few years later, Westlake was recruited to play live, along with other new band member Joe Wilson for their lengthy Becoming X tour in 1997. Westlake and Wilson were then subsequently kept on until their departure in 2002. Since then, Westlake joined Wilson in 2004 with Chris Tate to form the band Trash Money. Westlake also joined efforts with Liam Howe's first venture in solo production with the band Ultrafox, in 2005. Soon after, The Mighty Boosh hit the comedy scene and formed a live band, which Westlake joined. Nowadays, he makes a living by making music for film and television.
