= Becoming X =

- 1996 original release

Studio album by Sneaker Pimps
- Released: 19 August 1996 (UK); 25 February 1997 (US)
- Genres: Electronic; trip hop
- Length: 52:57
- Labels: Clean Up; Virgin
- Producers: Jim Abbiss; Line of Flight; Peter Collins; Flood

Sneaker Pimps chronology
| Becoming X (1996) | Becoming Remixed (1998) |

Singles from Becoming X
- 1. "Tesko Suicide" Released: 15 April 1996; 2. "Roll On" Released: 3 June 1996; 3. "6 Underground" Released: 30 September 1996; 4. "Spin Spin Sugar" Released: 3 March 1997; 5. "Post-Modern Sleaze" Released: 14 July 1997

Alternative cover
- 1997 limited edition release

Becoming X is the debut album by English electronic band Sneaker Pimps. It was released on 19 August 1996 in the United Kingdom by Clean Up Records and on 25 February 1997 in the United States by Virgin Records. The album marked the only appearance of Kelli Dayton as lead singer before she was asked to leave the band; Chris Corner replaced her for the band's subsequent albums.

Becoming X was commercially successful in the United Kingdom, while "6 Underground" and "Spin Spin Sugar" would become hits in the United States. Fueled by the success of the former single, the album spent 23 consecutive weeks on the US Billboard 200.

== Background and recording ==
Becoming X is an electronica and trip hop album, featuring alternative rock and orchestral elements and samples. The title comes from the fourth track on the album and, as explained by vocalist Kelli Dayton, "X meaning whatever you want it to mean. Also like generation X, X as a blank. It's a feeling. So it's really purposefully ambiguous, like the songs are. We've tried letting people use their imagination to make it more personal to them." This concept was later referenced in the name of Chris Corner's solo project IAMX.

The album was written by Corner and Liam Howe, with friend Ian Pickering contributing to the lyrics in what Corner calls "a total collaboration". The album's demos were recorded with Corner on vocals. However, the band felt the songs would work better with a female voice, so the band's manager and co-founder of their label Clean Up Records, Craig Mineard, sent the demos to Dayton, asking her to join the band as vocalist. Dayton liked the demos and agreed to join the band, on the condition of becoming a songwriting partner. As much of the writing for the album was already in place, Dayton went on to co-write the B-sides.

The album was recorded in Howe's bedroom studio in Elwick. The vocals were recorded in a cupboard that Howe made into a vocal booth. Possessing a higher vocal range than Corner, Dayton decided to record the tracks' vocals in a measured and subdued way to give them more emotional intensity.

"How Do", the last song on the album, is a cover of Paul Giovanni's "Willow's Song". It was also covered by Dayton on her album Butterfly in 2009.

== Release and promotion ==
Various iterations of the record exist with different artwork and track mixes. The first version features a cover with an electronic printed circuit board (PCB) designed by Foxy Design and was released in UK and Europe on 19 August 1996, on vinyl, CD and cassette by Clean Up Records. The album was released in the US on 25 February 1997 by Virgin Records featuring the Nellee Hooper remix of "6 Underground" as a bonus track.

Due to the success of the singles "6 Underground" and "Spin Spin Sugar", the album was reissued in 1997 with artwork by Stéphane Sednaoui. The reissue, referred to as the limited edition, features the Nellee Hooper remix of "6 Underground", the radio mix of "Spin Spin Sugar" and the Flight from Nashville mix of "Post-Modern Sleaze". This is the version provided on streaming platforms. The limited edition track listing was used for the 2008, 2016 and 2020 vinyl reissues of the album, although the original 1996 artwork was supplied instead of the limited edition artwork. This caused confusion, but One Little Independent Records insisted it was correct when it indeed was an error.

Five singles were released from the album: "Tesko Suicide", "Roll On" and "6 Underground" in 1996, and "Spin Spin Sugar" and "Post-Modern Sleaze" in 1997. Music videos were made for "Tesko Suicide", directed by Liam Howe and Joe Wilson, "6 Underground" and "Spin Spin Sugar", both directed by Toby Tremlett, and "Post-Modern Sleaze", directed by Howard Greenhalgh. They were later released on the 2001 video compilation The Videos on DVD.

The band embarked on a tour of the UK in small venues and worked their way up to a two-year world tour to promote the album, also appearing at music festivals and on TV shows. During their tour, they opened for Blur and Neneh Cherry, and played with Tricky and Lamb, establishing themselves as a trip hop band. The band's popularity was cemented when "6 Underground" was included on the soundtrack of the 1997 film The Saint, out on 4 April. They also featured on the Marilyn Manson track "Long Hard Road Out of Hell", released on 22 July 1997 and included in the film Spawn. In October, the band opened for Aphex Twin on his United States tour promoting the Richard D. James Album. The United States tour put a strain on the relationships in the band, leading to Howe prematurely leaving the tour, the tour itself stopping, and the subsequent firing of Dayton, who would not appear on the band's second album Splinter.

On 19 August 2022, the band began "a month of song and video celebrations" on their YouTube channel to mark the 26th anniversary of the release of the album.

== Critical reception ==
Professional ratings
Review scores
| Source | Rating |
|---|---|
| AllMusic | 4/5 stars |
| E! Online | B+ |
| Entertainment Weekly | B+ |
| Los Angeles Times | 2/4 stars |
| Muzik | 3/5 |
| NME | 5/10 |
| Pitchfork | 6.3/10 |
| Q | 3/5 stars |
| Rolling Stone | 3/5 stars |
| Vox | 7/10 |

Becoming X received mostly positive reviews from contemporary critics, who often compared Sneaker Pimps to trip hop artists like Portishead and Tricky.

AllMusic reviewer Stephen Thomas Erlewine praised Becoming X as "one of the most engaging byproducts of post-Portishead trip-hop", while also noting Sneaker Pimps as being more guitar-driven than their predecessors. Jeremy Helligar wrote in Entertainment Weekly that "Sneaker Pimps manage to be ominously spooky on Becoming X without indulging in Tricky's gothic pretension and hypnotic without lapsing into Portishead's one-note gloom." In Rolling Stone, Ken Micallef wrote that whilst not deviating from the female-fronted trip hop band formula, the group manages to "make pop as tension-filled as an Edgar Allan Poe novel". Calvin Bush from Muzik described the album as "spiky indie pop in a Garbage-meets-Portishead fashion", noting that the singles "Tesko Suicide" and "6 Underground" come across "like an indie kid version of Morcheeba with slasher guitars". Pitchfork's Ryan Schreiber likened Sneaker Pimps to "an electrified version of Sade" and praised the album's vocals, beats and guitars, albeit criticizing the songs for seemingly losing "a lot of their appeal once you're familiar with them".

In a more critical review for NME, Dele Fadele commended the band's original sound for blending electronic, orchestral and rock elements but ultimately described the result as boring.

== Track listing ==
All tracks are written by Chris Corner, Liam Howe and Ian Pickering, except where noted.

Original version
| No. | Title | Writer(s) | Producer(s) | Length |
|---|---|---|---|---|
| 1. | "Low Place Like Home" | | Jim Abbiss; Line of Flight | 4:37 |
| 2. | "Tesko Suicide" | | Line of Flight | 3:44 |
| 3. | "6 Underground" | Corner, Howe, Pickering, John Barry | Abbiss; Line of Flight | 4:05 |
| 4. | "Becoming X" | | Abbiss; Line of Flight | 4:14 |
| 5. | "Spin Spin Sugar" | | Line of Flight | 4:20 |
| 6. | "Post-Modern Sleaze" | | Line of Flight | 5:11 |
| 7. | "Waterbaby" | | Abbiss; Line of Flight | 4:10 |
| 8. | "Roll On" | | Abbiss; Line of Flight | 4:27 |
| 9. | "Wasted Early Sunday Morning" | | Flood; Line of Flight | 4:27 |
| 10. | "Walking Zero" | | Line of Flight | 4:31 |
| 11. | "How Do" | Paul Giovanni | Line of Flight | 5:01 |
| Total length: | | | | 48:47 |

U.S. edition bonus track
| No. | Title | Producer(s) | Length |
|---|---|---|---|
| 12. | "6 Underground" (Nellee Hooper Edit) | Abbiss; Nellee Hooper; Line of Flight | 3:48 |
| Total length: | | | 52:35 |

Japanese edition bonus tracks
| No. | Title | Writer(s) | Producer(s) | Length |
|---|---|---|---|---|
| 12. | "No More" | | Line of Flight | 4:15 |
| 13. | "Clean" | Kelli Dayton | Line of Flight | 5:17 |
| 14. | "Johnny" | | Line of Flight | 4:14 |
| 15. | "Precious" | Dayton | Line of Flight | 4:18 |
| Total length: | | | | 66:51 |

1997 limited edition
| No. | Title | Writer(s) | Producer(s) | Length |
|---|---|---|---|---|
| 1. | "Low Place Like Home" | | Abbiss; Line of Flight | 4:37 |
| 2. | "Tesko Suicide" | | Line of Flight | 3:44 |
| 3. | "6 Underground" (Nellee Hooper Remix) | | Abbiss; Nellee Hooper; Line of Flight | 3:48 |
| 4. | "Becoming X" | | Abbiss; Line of Flight | 4:14 |
| 5. | "Spin Spin Sugar" (Radio Mix) | | Line of Flight; Mark "Spike" Stent | 3:34 |
| 6. | "Post-Modern Sleaze" (Flight from Nashville Mix) | | Abbiss; Peter Collins; Line of Flight | 3:29 |
| 7. | "Waterbaby" | | Abbiss; Line of Flight | 4:10 |
| 8. | "Roll On" | | Abbiss; Line of Flight | 4:27 |
| 9. | "Wasted Early Sunday Morning" | | Flood; Line of Flight | 4:27 |
| 10. | "Walking Zero" | | Line of Flight | 4:31 |
| 11. | "How Do" | Paul Giovanni | Line of Flight | 5:01 |
| Total length: | | | | 46:02 |

Japanese limited edition bonus tracks
| No. | Title | Writer(s) | Producer(s) | Length |
|---|---|---|---|---|
| 12. | "Walk the Rain" | Dayton | Line of Flight | 4:58 |
| Total length: | | | | 51:00 |

== Samples ==
- "6 Underground" sampled John Barry's track "Golden Girl" from the film Goldfinger (1964)
- "Becoming X" sampled Sandy Denny's track "Next Time Around" (1971)
- "Spin Spin Sugar" sampled Luciano Berio's "Visage" (1961)
- "Post-Modern Sleaze" sampled the ritual music from the final scenes of the film The Wicker Man (1973)
- "Waterbaby" sampled David Sylvian's track "Let the Happiness In" (1987), "Guru Sri Chinmoy Aphorism" by Carlos Santana and Alice Coltrane (1974) and Jimmy Fontana's track "Il Mondo" (1965)
- "How Do" sampled the Rachel Verney vocal audio from the soundtrack in the 1973 British horror film The Wicker Man
- Live versions of "Spin Spin Sugar" often sampled Kraftwerk's track "Boing Boom Tschak" (1986)
- "Can't Find My Way Home", the B-side to "6 Underground" sampled John Martyn's track "Go Down Easy" (1973)
- The demo version of "Low Place Like Home" sampled David Sylvian's tracks "Before the Bullfight" and "Wave" (1986)
- Live versions of "Six Underground" often sampled Deutsch Amerikanische Freundschaft's track "Sex Under Water"

== Personnel ==
=== Sneaker Pimps ===
- Kelli Dayton − vocals, guitars
- Chris Corner − guitars, keyboards
- Liam Howe − production, keyboards, guitars, drums, samples, percussion, programming
- Joe Wilson − bass, keyboards
- Dave Westlake − drums, programming
- Ian Pickering – lyrics, keyboards

=== Other personnel ===
- Jim Abbiss, C. Goddard, Flood, Oggy AKA Augustus Skinner, Luke Gifford − engineering
- Mark "Spike" Stent, Flood, Jim Abbiss, Line of Flight, Nellee Hooper, Luke Gifford − mixing
- Andy Wright, Marius de Vries − additional programming and keyboards

== Charts ==
Chart performance for Becoming X
| Chart (1997) | Peak position |
|---|---|
| Australian Albums (ARIA) | 55 |
| UK Albums (OCC) | 27 |
| US Billboard 200 | 111 |

== Certifications ==
Certifications for Becoming X
| Region | Certification | Certified units/sales |
|---|---|---|
| United Kingdom (BPI) | Gold | 100,000^{^} |
^{^} Shipments figures based on certification alone.
