= Post-Modern Sleaze =

Single by Sneaker Pimps

Single by Sneaker Pimps

from the album Becoming X
- Released: 14 July 1997
- Genre: Trip hop, alternative rock
- Length: 3:31
- Label: Clean Up
- Songwriter(s): Chris Corner; Liam Howe; Ian D. Pickering
- Producer(s): Flood; Jim Abbiss

Sneaker Pimps singles chronology
"Spin Spin Sugar" (1997)	"Post-Modern Sleaze" (1997)	"Low Five" (1999)

Music video
- "Post-Modern Sleaze" on YouTube

"Post-Modern Sleaze" is a single released by British trip hop band Sneaker Pimps in 1997 from their debut album Becoming X. It reached number 22 on the UK Singles Chart and number 143 in Australia.

== Track listing ==
UK CD single

1. "Post-Modern Sleaze (Video Mix)" – 3:48
2. "Spin Spin Sugar (Reprazent Mix)" – 7:05
3. "Post-Modern Sleaze (Underdog Remix)" – 7:05
4. "Post-Modern Sleaze (Boilerhouse Remix)" – 3:53

UK 12" single

1. "Post-Modern Sleaze (Phunk Phorce Mix)" – 8:41
2. "Post-Modern Sleaze (Sneak's A Pimp Mix)" – 7:58
3. "Post-Modern Sleaze (Salt City Orchestra Nightclub Mix)" – 8:43
4. "Post-Modern Sleaze (Reprazent Mix)" – 7:11

== Charts ==
Chart (1997)	Peak position
Australia (ARIA)	143
Scotland (OCC)	22
UK Singles (OCC)	22
UK Dance (OCC)	4
