= Sweet Disarray =

Studio album by Dan Croll
- Released: 10 March 2014
- Length: 38:18
- Label: Deram

Dan Croll chronology
Sweet Disarray (2014)	Emerging Adulthood (2017)

Singles from Sweet Disarray
- 1. "From Nowhere" Released: 24 September 2012; 2. "Compliment Your Soul" Released: 1 April 2013; 3. "In/Out" Released: 12 July 2013; 4. "Home" Released: 1 December 2013

Sweet Disarray is the debut studio album by British recording artist Dan Croll. It was released on 10 March 2014 by Deram Records in the United Kingdom.

== Composition ==
The closing track, "Home", is a sweet, jangly folk-pop tune that was inspired by Croll's days as a broke student, coming home after an ill-advised and ill-prepared-for winter weekend getaway to Berlin.

== Critical reception ==
Professional ratings
Aggregate scores
Source	Rating
Metacritic	59/100
Review scores
Source	Rating
Allmusic	4/5 stars
Clash	6/10
Consequence of Sound	D+
DIY	3/5 stars
Filter	82%
The Guardian	3/5 stars
The Irish Times	3/5 stars
The Independent	3/5 stars
The Independent on Sunday	3/5 stars
Under the Radar	4/10 stars

At Metacritic, which assigns a rated mean out of 100 from mainstream critics, the album received a score of 59, which indicates "mixed or average reviews". Writing for AllMusic, Timothy Monger gave the album four out of five stars, calling Sweet Disarray a "colorful and immaculately produced debut album" which "proves [that] Croll has both a forward-looking experimentalism and pretty solid songwriting chops to boot. In spite of the extremely high expectations, he has managed a pretty neat debut that will please fans who have been waiting since his early singles". In her review for The Guardian, Caroline Sullivan compared Croll to American singer-songwriter Jack Johnson and declared Sweet Disarray "a pretty good album" that "conflates lilting Scousepop and electronica into a warm nether-genre, with added sleek choruses that sound equally right on 6Music and Radio 1. Filter magazine journalist Laura Studarus called Sweet Disarray "a rare debut, as well crafted as it is likeable". She praised its "sound that suggests Paul McCartney with a taste for Afro-pop, rock, electronics and the occasional grand-sweeping, Paul Simon–style folk gesture."

DIY author Emma Swann felt that "despite [its] variety, not once does the record feel disjointed, or out of place. It’s a skill, but Croll’s soothing vocals, as well as he and his team’s spot-on engineering of the whole lot means it can slide from that soaring single to Croll’s inner Justin Timberlake via steel guitars and ukulele without missing a beat. It’s pleasantly pristine stuff from the still relative newcomer". Joe Rivers, writing for Clash magazine, found that Sweet Disarray was "patchy" and that it "would be an unremarkable singer-songwriter album were it not for Croll's welcome smatterings of electronica, soul and, most intriguingly, Afrobeat throughout. In his The Independent review, Andy Gill wrote that Croll's "ambitious arrangements need more disarray, and less sweetness". Similarly, Kate Wills from sister newspaper The Independent on Sunday concluded that Sweet Disarray "won’t frighten the horses, but it might encourage you to buy an overpriced T-shirt. Job’s a good ’un." Less impressed, Randall Colburn from Consequence of Sound felt that the album "reads more like a college thesis designed to satiate a panel of professors than it does an original document". He added that it "sounds like a who’s who of Spotify buzz bands, a time-stamped memo alerting music executives to the mainstream’s idea of indie rock [...] Croll remains a mystery, a patchwork of influences content to blend in, not to stand out."

== Commercial performance ==
Sweet Disarray debuted and peaked at number 26 on the UK Albums Chart in the week of 16 March 2014. In the United States, it reached number 12 on Billboard's Heatseekers Albums chart.

== Track listing ==
Credits adapted from the liner notes of Sweet Disarray.

Sweet Disarray – Standard edition
No.	Title	Writer(s)	Producer(s)	Length
1.	"From Nowhere"	Croll; Joe Wills	Wills	3:17
2.	"Thinkin Aboutchu"	Croll; Liam Howe	Howe; Wills	2:59
3.	"Wanna Know"	Croll; George Astasio; Jon Shave; Jason Pebworth; Dan Smith	Jonathan Gilmore; Wills	2:35
4.	"In/Out"	Croll; Dustin Wong	Croll; Wills	3:14
5.	"Compliment Your Soul"	Croll; Johan Karlberg	Croll; Wills	3:02
6.	"Only Ghost"	Croll	Wills	3:00
7.	"Can You Hear Me"	Croll; Wills	Wills	3:31
8.	"Sweet Disarray"	Croll; Wills	Wills	3:25
9.	"Maway"	Croll; Wills	Wills; Charlie Hugall	3:14
10.	"Must Be Leaving"	Croll; Jethro Fox; Eric Molumby	Wills	3:00
11.	"Always Like This"	Croll	Wills	3:12
12.	"Home"	Croll	Wills	3:49

Sweet Disarray – Deluxe edition
No.	Title	Writer(s)	Producer(s)	Length
13.	"Nobody Knows (Edit)" (featuring The Very Best)	Croll; Johan Hugo; Esau Mwamwaya	Hugo	3:26
14.	"Nobody Knows" (featuring The Very Best)	Croll; Hugo; Mwamwaya	Hugo	3:41
15.	"If You Want Me (Edit)"	Croll; Carl Arvid Lehne	Lehne	3:36
16.	"If You Want Me"	Croll; Carl Arvid Lehne	Lehne	4:13
17.	"Hello My Baby" (featuring Ladysmith Black Mambazo)	Croll; Joseph Shabalala	Jonathan Gilmore; Croll	4:29
18.	"Maway" (featuring Ladysmith Black Mambazo)	Croll; Shabalala	Gilmore; Croll	2:36
19.	"Home" (featuring Ladysmith Black Mambazo)	Croll; Shabalala	Gilmore; Croll	3:52
20.	"Cinnamon"	Croll; Joe Wills	Wills	2:59
21.	"Ever At Your Side"	Croll	Wills	3:12
22.	"Eyes Together"	Croll	Wills	2:56
Total length:				73:07

== Charts ==
Weekly chart performance for Sweet Disarray
Chart (2014)	Peak position
UK Albums (OCC)	26
US Heatseekers Albums (Billboard)	12
