= Sharon Kovacs =

Dutch singer

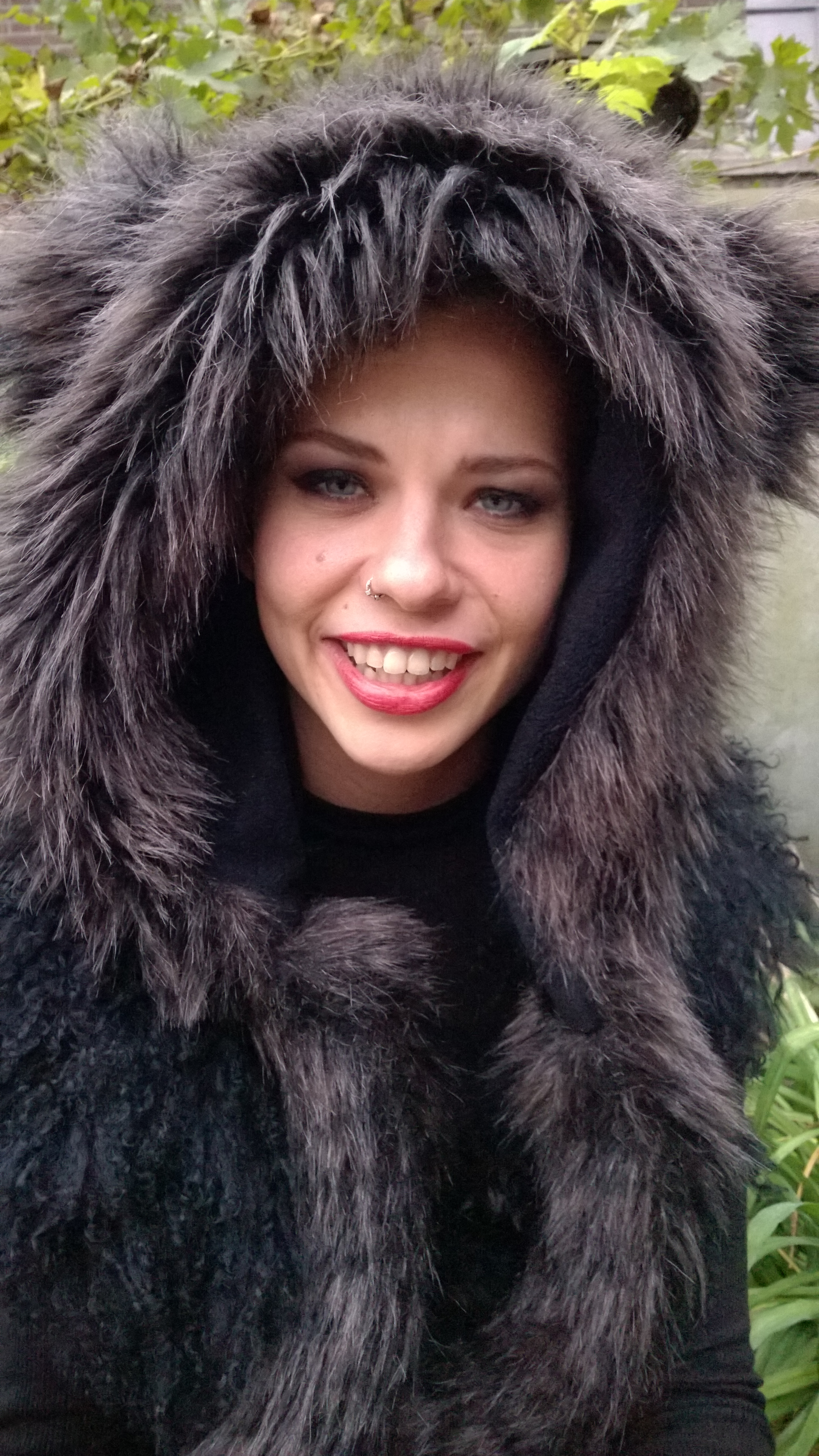

Background information
- Born: 15 April 1990 (age 36); Baarlo, Netherlands
- Years active: 2014–present
- Website: kovacsmusic.com

Sharon Kovacs (born 15 April 1990), known professionally as Kovacs, is a Dutch singer from Baarlo.

== Career ==
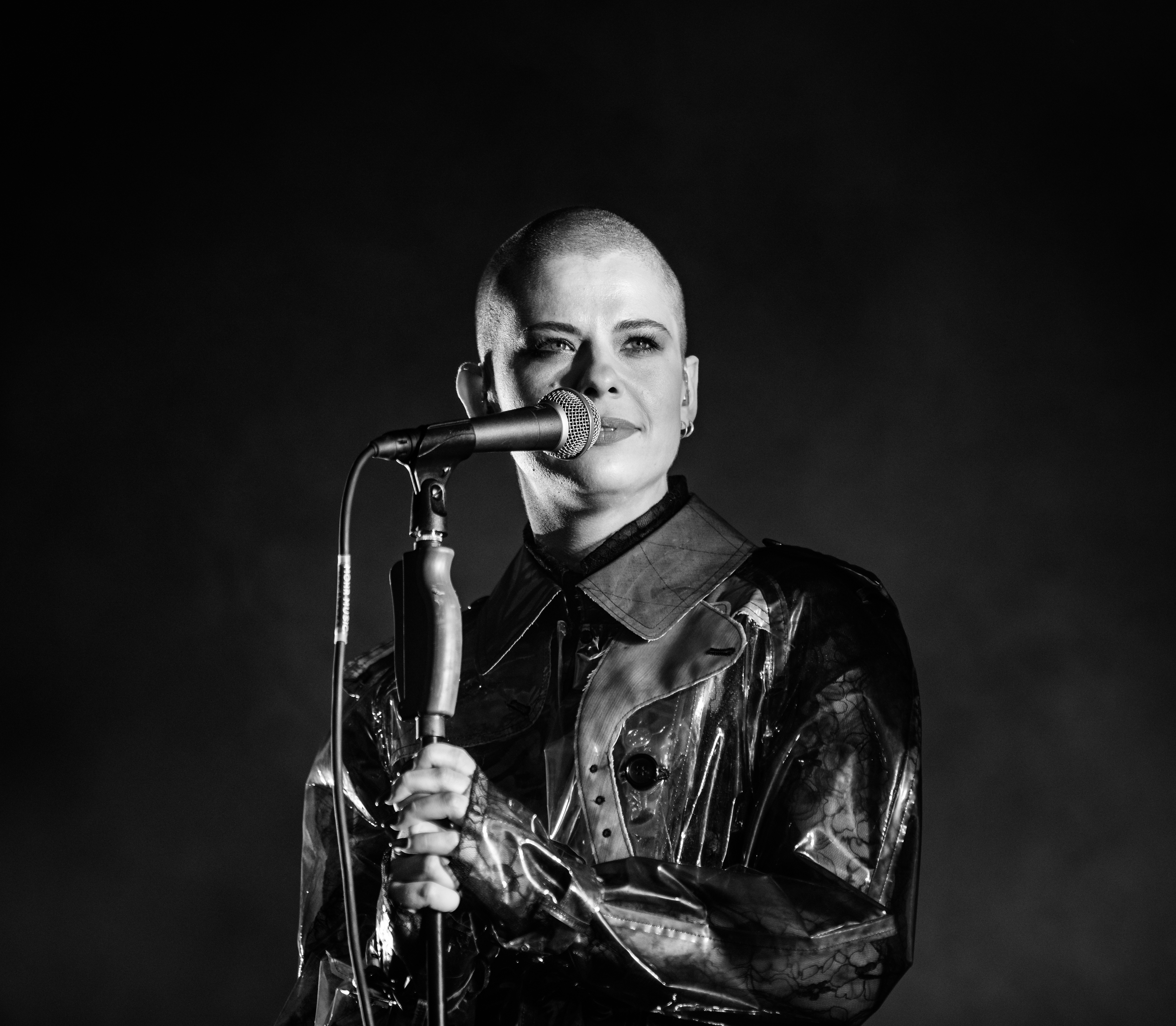
Sharon Kovacs live at Rock am Ring 2019.

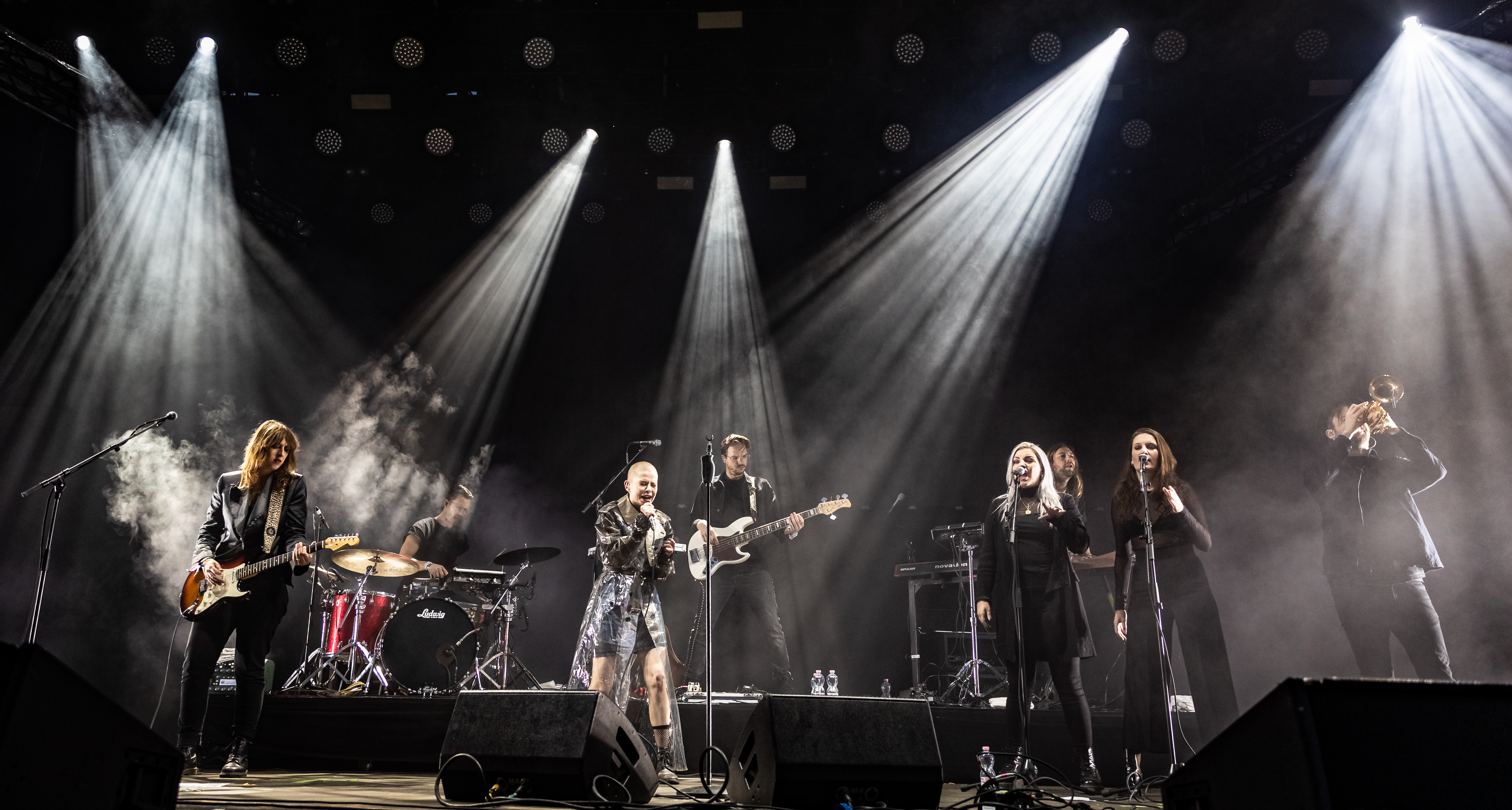
Sharon Kovacs live at Rock am Ring 2019.

Kovacs studied at Rock City Institute, a vocational school in Eindhoven, the Netherlands. She graduated in 2013. In 2014 she worked with producer Oscar Holleman to record her first EP My Love, which was partly recorded in Cuba. On 1 June 2014, Dutch radio station NPO 3FM named her 3FM Serious Talent. In 2014, she played at various festivals amongst which North Sea Jazz and Lowlands (festival). On 2 October she won the Dutch NPO Radio 6 Soul & Jazz Award in the category 'Best Soul & Jazz Talent'.

Her first album Shades Of Black was released on 2 April 2015, after which she started her Shades of Black club tour and played at various festivals throughout Europe, Turkey and Israel. After My Love the single Diggin' was another chart success.

On 29 October it was announced that she is the fourth winner of a 2016 European Border Breakers Award.

Sugar Pill, Kovacs's first new song in two years, was released in June 2017. After the release of her debut album, she immediately started working on her second album, together with producer Liam Howe, who also collaborates with Lana Del Rey, Adele, Marina and the Diamonds and FKA twigs, among others.

Sophomore album Cheap Smell was released in August 2018, preceded by the singles Black Spider and It's The Weekend. The album entered the charts in Switzerland, Germany, Austria, Belgium and the Netherlands, where it reached the 7th place.

In 2019 the non-album singles Snake Charmer (with Parov Stelar), You Again (written for the German film Dem Horizont so nah) and Crazy (with Metropool Orkest) were released.

In 2020, Kovacs wrote Mata Hari, which kicked off the fifth edition of the Art Rocks project, challenging musicians to write a song inspired by an artwork from the collections of fifteen different Dutch museums.

The summer single Tutti Frutti Tequila was released on 16 July 2020, chosen by Holland's NPO Radio 2 as TopSong.

In March 2022, Kovacs released the single Not Scared Of Giants, reportedly a preview of a new album. It was accompanied by an impressive video which was filmed and sung live in one take. It was followed by the singles and videos Bang Bang, Fragile and Goldmine, all previews of Kovacs's third album Child Of Sin, which was released on 13 January 2023. The album was co-written and produced by Jonathan Quarmby, the house producer of London's RAK Studio, who has previously worked with James Morrison, Mika, Nancy Sinatra and The Pretenders, among others.The title song is a duet with Rammstein singer Till Lindemann. In one of Holland's leading newspapers Volkskrant the album received 4 stars and reviewer Pablo Cabenda wrote: "Sharon Kovacs shows just the right sense of drama on Child of Sin". On 20 January 2023 Child Of Sin entered the Album Top 100 at #5.

On 8 July 2023 the much-discussed video of Child Of Sin, starring Sharon and Till Lindemann, was released.

== Discography ==
Studio albums

- Shades of Black (2015)
- Cheap Smell (2018)
- Child of Sin (2023)
- Static Tears (2026)

Singles

- My Love EP (2014)
- "The Devil You Know" (2015)
- "Sugar Pill" (2017)
- "Cheap Smell" (2018)
- "Black Spider" (2018)
- "It's the Weekend" featuring Gnash (2018)
- "Mama & Papa" (2018)
- "Snake Charmer" featuring Parov Stelar (2019)
- "You Again" (2019)
- "Crazy" featuring Metropole Orkest (2019)
- "Tutti Frutti Tequila" (2021)
- "Not Scared of Giants" (2022)
- "Bang Bang" (2022)
- "Fragile" (2022)
- "Goldmine" (2022)
- "Child of Sin" featuring Till Lindemann (2023)
- "Mycose" (2024)
