= We Have Sound =

Studio album by Tom Vek
- Released: 4 April 2005
- Recorded: 2004; London
- Genre: Post-punk revival, dance-punk, indie rock, indietronica
- Length: 39:09
- Label: Tummy Touch; Go! Beat Records; Startime International

Tom Vek chronology
We Have Sound (2005)	Live from London (2005)

Professional ratings
Review scores
Source	Rating
Gigwise.com	3.5/5 stars
AllMusic	3.5/5 stars
Drowned in Sound	(6/10)
Pitchfork	(7.6/10)

We Have Sound is the first studio album by the rock artist Tom Vek. It was released on 4 April 2005 in the UK, and 25 October 2005 in the US.

== Track listing ==
All tracks written Tom Vek

No.	Title	Length
1.	"C-C (You Set the Fire in Me)"	4:32
2.	"I Ain't Saying My Goodbyes"	3:45
3.	"If You Want"	3:47
4.	"A Little Word in Your Ear"	3:51
5.	"If I Had Changed My Mind"	3:37
6.	"The Lower the Sun"	3:37
7.	"Cover"	3:36
8.	"Nothing But Green Lights"	4:17
9.	"On the Road"	4:11
10.	"That Can Be Arranged"	3:49

== Charts ==
Chart (2005)	Peak position
UK Albums Chart	73

== Release history ==
Date	Country
4 April 2005	United Kingdom
25 October 2005	United States
