= Becoming Remixed =

Remix album by Sneaker Pimps
- Released: 10 March 1998
- Label: Virgin

Sneaker Pimps chronology
Becoming X (1996)	Becoming Remixed (1998)	Splinter (1999)

Professional ratings
Review scores
Source	Rating
AllMusic	link
Pitchfork Media	(5.9/10) link

Becoming Remixed is a remix album by English electronic band Sneaker Pimps, released on 10 March 1998 by Virgin Records. It serves as a companion piece to the band's 1996 debut Becoming X, and was originally limited to 30,000 copies.

== Track listing ==
1. "Spin Spin Sugar (Armand's Dark Garage Mix)"
2. "Walking Zero (Tuff & Jam Unda-Vybe Vocal)"
3. "Post-Modern Sleaze (The Salt City Orchestra Nightclub Mix)"
4. "Spin Spin Sugar (Armand's Bonus Dub)"
5. "Post-Modern Sleaze (Reprazent Mix)"
6. "6 Underground (Perfecto Mix)"
7. "Tesko Suicide (Americruiser Mix)"
8. "Roll On (Fold Mix)"
9. "6 Underground (The Umbrellas of Ladywell Mix #2)"
10. "Post-Modern Sleaze (Flight from Nashville)"
