= Squaring the Circle (album) =

2021 album by Sneaker Pimps

Studio album by Sneaker Pimps
- Released: 10 September 2021
- Studio: Sawtooth Studios, Pioneertown, California, US; Tower Studios, London, England
- Genre: Electronic; trip hop; indie pop
- Length: 1:07:40
- Label: Unfall Productions
- Producer: Sneaker Pimps: Liam Howe; Chris Corner

Sneaker Pimps chronology
Bloodsport (2002)	Squaring the Circle (2021)

Squaring the Circle is the fourth studio album by English electronic band Sneaker Pimps, released on 10 September 2021.

== Content ==
After a hiatus of 18 years, it is the fourth album in the Sneaker Pimps discography. It includes songs that had been sitting incomplete for decades, and collaborations with singer Simonne Jones. This returned the group to a trio of founders Liam Howe and Chris Corner alongside a female vocalist, reflecting their most commercially successful period in the mid-1990s when they worked with Kelli Ali.

The album was recorded at Sawtooth Studios, Pioneertown, California and the Tower Studios, London. It features Corner playing acoustic guitar on several tracks; Corner has said he has been influenced by Spanish guitar music and Simon and Garfunkel. The title comes from squaring the circle, a seemingly impossible process, which describes the relationship between Howe and Corner and the unlikeliness of them reforming.

The title track and "Fighter" were released as singles ahead of the album in July 2021, which was released on 10 September.

Howe's solo venture as Ape Mink Press (AMP) remixed several tracks from the album, including "Alibis", "Fighter" and "So Far Gone".

== Critical reception ==
The album received a mixed review from Dana Alward of mxdwn.com, who appreciated the duo wanted to move on from previous work, but found the resulting work "fails to create a cohesive thematic atmosphere". Saby Reyes-Kulkarni of Popmatters appreciated tracks like "Tranquility Trap", "Child in the Dark" and "Immaculate Hearts" which showed them as "a latter-day Depeche Mode" and praised Corner's acoustic guitar work, but criticised the lack of input from Jones, adding the founding duo "haven't learned from past mistakes".

The album failed to gain any wider critical or media attention from more established outlets, and did not achieve any notable commercial or chart success in any territory.

== Track listing ==
1. "Fighter"
2. "Child in the Dark"
3. "Alibis"
4. "So Far Gone"
5. "Immaculate Hearts"
6. "No Show"
7. "The Tranquillity Trap"
8. "SOS"
9. "Stripes"
10. "The Paper Room"
11. "Black Rain"
12. "Love Me Stupid"
13. "Lifeline"
14. "Pink Noise"
15. "Come Like the Cure"
16. "Squaring the Circle"
