= Waltzes for Weirdoes =

2003 album by Grandadbob

Studio album by Grandadbob
- Released: 2003
- Genre: Electronic, pop, dance music, house music
- Length: 57:50
- Label: Southern Fried Records
- Producer: Vanessa Robinson, Dave Johnson

Professional ratings
Review scores
Source	Rating
MusicOMH	
Allmusic	3/5 stars
Resident Advisor	
Remix	4.5/5 stars

Waltzes for Weirdoes is the debut album by English electronic duo Grandadbob. It was released by Southern Fried Records in 2003.

== Track listing ==
UK Version

1. "Monster" – 2:15
2. "City Approach" – 4:28
3. "Mmmnn" – 3:53
4. "Your Mama" – 4:12
5. "This Is It" – 5:14
6. "Maybe" – 7:05
7. "Open Mouthed" – 5:20
8. "3am Gherkin" – 6:36
9. "Just Show Me" – 3:31
10. "Killed By Sweets" – 4:25
11. "Kenny" – 3:55
12. "Anger Thy Neighbour" – 6:56
