= Emerging Adulthood =

Studio album by Dan Croll
- Released: 21 July 2017
- Genre: Indie rock, indie pop
- Length: 37:15
- Label: Communion Music

Dan Croll chronology
Sweet Disarray (2014)	Emerging Adulthood (2017)	Grand Plan (2020)

Emerging Adulthood is the second studio album by Dan Croll. It was released on 21 July 2017 by Communion Music.

== Critical reception ==
Professional ratings
Aggregate scores
Source	Rating
Metacritic	57/100
Review scores
Source	Rating
Clash	7/10
The Independent	2/5 stars
Q	3/5 stars
The Skinny	3/5 stars

At Metacritic, which assigns an average rating from mainstream critics, the album received a score of 57 out of 100, based on four reviews, which indicates "mixed or average reviews". Writing for The Independent, the journalist Andy Gill gave the album two out of five stars, writing, "Dan Croll's follow-up to Sweet Disarray suffers from a kind of creeping anonymity: immediately after hearing it, it's virtually impossible to recollect the salient features of any track." In a more positive review, Clash journalist Lois Browne wrote, "Though Emerging Adulthood does push Croll far out of his personal comfort zone to a certain extent, it does feel like he could go further with the complexity. Nevertheless, his musicianship is undeniable, as each and every instrument on the record is played by himself. It's a vital sign that Croll's only just coming truly into his own."

== Track listing ==
All tracks are written by Dan Croll

No.	Title	Length
1.	"One of Us"	3:59
2.	"Bad Boy"	3:28
3.	"24"	3:29
4.	"January"	3:52
5.	"Sometimes When I'm Lonely"	3:45
6.	"Swim"	3:18
7.	"Educate"	3:36
8.	"Away from Today"	3:24
9.	"Do You Have To"	3:24
10.	"Tokyo"	4:56
