= Trash Money =

English rock music group

Trash Money is an English rock band, created in 1998 by the former Sneaker Pimps members, Joe Wilson and Chris Tate. They are joined in live performances by Dave Westlake, also formerly of the Sneaker Pimps, Molly Dolittle Slade, formerly of Little Killers, and Cary Creed.

Trash Money diverges completely from its trip hop ancestry in the Sneaker Pimps, and embraces punk, irony, and musical experimentation. September 2006 saw the release of their eponymous eleven-track debut album, containing all their previous single releases, all of which had been self-financed limited-edition pressings.

== Press reception ==
Their first release, "You Lied Satan", a single-sided vinyl-only 7 inch, was chosen by NME as its "single of the week", as was their later "Million Pound Note", describing the band as "deranged genius". The Guardian described the band in a review as "brilliant but wilfully unsaleable". Artrocker called the band's music "incredibly catchy", while Drowned in Sound described it as "fantastic noisy electronic rock", Sleazenation rated it as "maximum dancefloor getdown", and Dazed & Confused commented "fuzz guitars and bitter musings are back". Mixmag found it "like David Byrne having a mental breakdown".

The band have often been mentioned by BBC comedians the Mighty Boosh, both on radio shows and in interviews; their member Noel Fielding commented "The singer's great, the classic front man in an old fashioned sense, in that he makes you feel really weird and looks mental".
