= Bloodsport (album) =

Studio album by Sneaker Pimps
- Released: 22 January 2002
- Studios: Line of Flight Studios; Strongroom, London
- Genre: Trip hop
- Length: 60:38
- Labels: Tommy Boy Records; SYN; V2; El Diablo!; Splinter Recordings
- Producers: Jim Abbiss; Flood; Line Of Flight; 140db

Sneaker Pimps chronology
| Splinter (1999) | Bloodsport (2002) | Squaring the Circle (2021) |

Singles from Bloodsport
- 1. "Sick" Released: 2002; 2. "Bloodsport" Released: 2002; 3. "Loretta Young Silks" Released: 2002

Bloodsport is the third studio album by English electronic band Sneaker Pimps. It was released on 22 January 2002, through record label Tommy Boy.

Despite a positive fan reception, it received a mediocre response from music critics at the time of its release, and was commercially unsuccessful, failing to chart in the band's home country of the UK.

It would also be the last album recorded before their 20 year hiatus until 2021's release of Squaring The Circle, in which the band reformed and released their long-awaited, double album.

== Content ==
The album opener "Kiro TV" is named after the US television station KIRO-TV. The title of "Loretta Young Silks" refers to the US actress Loretta Young.

=== Musical style ===
Described as trip hop, the album had the label "goth" affixed to it by more than one reviewer.

== Release ==
Bloodsport was released on 22 January 2002 on CD as well as double red vinyl, through record label Tommy Boy.

It failed to chart in the band's home country of the UK, but reached number 68 in the Austrian top 75 album chart. Lead single "Sick" charted at 100 on the UK Singles Chart.

The album was originally intended to be called Forsythe, but was changed last minute. The recording sessions were mainly in rural France and several Bloodsport era songs which weren't included on the final album were released elsewhere: Miami Counting appears as a B-side for the Loretta Young Silks single, the Sick single and the Japanese edition of Bloodsport contain a track called After Every Party I Die, which was later re-recorded by Chris Corner's side project IAMX and released on the album The Alternative, O-Type was included as a B-side on the 12-inch vinyl single of Bloodsport but was never released in the digital realm and a completely unreleased track called Polaroids was later used on the IAMX album Kiss and Swallow, albeit in a totally revamped and remixed form. A proposed track mentioned on their old forum was teased as Masturbate, but this was never recorded.

== Reception ==
Professional ratings
Aggregate scores
| Source | Rating |
|---|---|
| Metacritic | 50/100 |
Review scores
| Source | Rating |
| AllMusic | 2/5 stars |
| Drowned in Sound | 4/10 |
| Entertainment Weekly | C+ |
| NME | 4/10 |
| Q | 2/5 stars |

Despite garnering a positive response from listeners and fans on Metacritic, Bloodsport was given a generally negative reception from music critics at the time of its release. This was perhaps epitomised in Drowned in Sound's review: "How do you criticise one of your favourite bands ever? [...] this is classic Sneaker Pimps, which is my main gripe about this album, its [sic] too classic Sneaker Pimps. All of the songs seem to be rehashes of previous releases. To put it bluntly this band should have and could have progressed. [sic]"

== Track listing ==
All tracks are written by Chris Corner; Liam Howe; Ian Pickering, except "Grazes".

| No. | Title | Length |
|---|---|---|
| 1. | "Kiro TV" | 3:45 |
| 2. | "Sick" | 4:15 |
| 3. | "Small Town Witch" | 4:48 |
| 4. | "Black Sheep" | 4:01 |
| 5. | "Loretta Young Silks" | 5:58 |
| 6. | "M'aidez" | 5:12 |
| 7. | "The Fuel" | 4:51 |
| 8. | "Bloodsport" | 5:24 |
| 9. | "Think Harder" | 4:44 |
| 10. | "Blue Movie" | 4:08 |
| 11. | "Grazes" | 6:44 |
| 12. | "After Every Party I Die" (Japanese edition bonus track) | 6:48 |

== Samples ==
- 'Kiro TV' sampled Ultravox's track: 'ROckWrok' (1977)
- 'Sick' sampled André Previn's track: 'Executive Party' from the film 'Rollerball' (1975)
- 'Small Town Witch' sampled Iggy Pop's track: 'Nightclubbing' (1977)
- 'Loretta Young Silks' sampled Bill Withers' track: 'I Wish You Well' (1975) and Ippu-Do's track: 'Chinese Reggae' (1980)
- 'The Fuel' sampled James Horner's tracks: 'Following Kirwill' and 'Irina's Chase' from the film 'Gorky Park' (1983)
- 'Bloodsport' sampled Visage's track: 'Tar' (1979)
- 'Blue Movie' sampled The Keynotes' track: 'Canaan's Land' (1973)
- The unreleased 'Bloodsport' session track 'Polaroids' sampled Gary Numan's track: 'Metal' (1979)
- 'O-Type', the b-side to 'Bloodsport' sampled both The Human League's track: 'Love Action' (1981) and Bauhaus' track: 'Three Shadows (Part Three)' (1982)
