= Luck (Tom Vek album) =

Studio album by Tom Vek
- Released: 9 June 2014
- Recorded: 2014; London
- Genre: Post-punk revival, indie rock, dance-punk, indietronica
- Label: Moshi Moshi Records

Tom Vek chronology
Leisure Seizure (2011)	Luck (2014)

Singles from Luck
- 1. "Sherman (Animals in the Jungle)" Released: 11 April 2014

Luck is the third studio album by artist Tom Vek, released on 9 June 2014. The first single "Sherman (Animals in the Jungle)" was released on 11 April 2014.

== Track listing ==
No.	Title	Length
1.	"How Am I Meant to Know"	2:38
2.	"Sherman (Animals in the Jungle)"	4:03
3.	"Broke"	4:23
4.	"Pushing Your Luck"	4:35
5.	"Ton of Bricks"	5:36
6.	"Trying to Do Better"	4:58
7.	"The Girl You Wouldn't Leave for Any Other Girl"	4:19
8.	"A Mistake"	4:06
9.	"You'll Stay"	4:05
10.	"The Tongue Avoids the Teeth"	4:06
11.	"Let's Pray"	3:52

== Critical reception ==
Professional ratings
Review scores
Source	Rating
AllMusic	3.5/5 stars
NME	5/10 stars
Drowned in Sound	6/10 stars
musicOMH	8/10 stars

Luck received generally favourable reviews from critics. On Metacritic, which assigns a "weighted average" rating out of 100 from selected independent ratings and reviews from mainstream critics, the album received a Metascore of 72 based on 14 reviews.

Sofie Jenkinson from The Line of Best Fit called the album, "the vehicle for one of the most unusual and malleable voices in Britain today." and gave the album a score of 85/100.
