= Spin Spin Sugar =

1997 single by Sneaker Pimps

Single by Sneaker Pimps

from the album Becoming X
- B-side: "Walk the Rain"; "How Do"; "Walking Zero"
- Released: 3 March 1997
- Genre: Trip hop (album version); dance-rock (single version); speed garage (Armand van Helden, Tuff Jam & 187 Lockdown mixes)
- Length: 3:36
- Label: Clean Up
- Songwriters: Chris Corner; Liam Howe; Ian D. Pickering

Sneaker Pimps singles chronology
"6 Underground" (1996)	"Spin Spin Sugar" (1997)	"Post-Modern Sleaze" (1997)

Music video
- "Spin Spin Sugar" on YouTube

"Spin Spin Sugar" is a song by English electronic band Sneaker Pimps, released in March 1997 by Clean Up as the fourth single from their debut studio album, Becoming X (1996). The album version is typical of the Sneaker Pimps in both style and format; there is a driving bass line produced by a synthesizer keyboard which is accompanied by a second synthesizer loop playing above it. Kelli Dayton provides the vocals.

"Spin Spin Sugar" was further popularized with the release of a speed garage remix by Armand van Helden, which is sometimes credited with breaking speed garage into the mainstream for the first time. Redbull.com included the remix in their "Honorable mentions" list of "underground UK garage classics that still sound fresh today".

== Critical reception ==
British magazine Music Week gave the song three out of five, writing, "A faster, guitar and percussion-cluttered radio mix lacks the brooding menace of the album version, but club mixes by Van Helden and Farley & Heller, plus a new track 'Walk the Rain', will lift its chances." The Times newspaper described it as a "twitchy, dance-rock crossover song from much-fancied indie kids with attitude."

== Track listings ==
- UK CD single
1. "Spin Spin Sugar" (radio edit) – 3:34
2. "Spin Spin Sugar" (album mix) – 4:20
3. "Walk the Rain" – 4:58
4. "How Do" – 5:01
- UK 12-inch single
1. "Spin Spin Sugar" (Armand's Dark Garage mix) – 9:05
2. "Walking Zero" (Tuff & Jam Unda-Vybe vocal) – 6:36
3. "Walking Zero" (Tuff & Jam Unda-Vybe dub instrumental) – 6:36

== Charts ==
=== Weekly charts ===
Chart (1997)	Peak position
Australia (ARIA)	126
UK Singles (OCC)	21
UK Dance (OCC)	1
US Billboard Hot 100	87
US Hot Dance Club Songs (Billboard)	2

Chart (2015)	Peak position
US Hot Dance Club Songs (Billboard)	7

=== Year-end charts ===
Chart (1997)	Position
Canada Dance/Urban (RPM)	25
UK Club Chart (Music Week)	88
