= Kriya (disambiguation) =

Kriyā (Sanskrit: क्रिया, 'action, deed, effort') is a "completed action", technique or practice within a yoga discipline meant to achieve a specific result.

Kriya or Kriya Yoga may also refer to:

- Kriya Yoga in the Yoga Sutras of Patanjali
- Kriya Yoga school, a modern yoga school
- Kriya, a class of Tantra in Tibetan Buddhism

== See also ==
- Kriya Yoga Express, a train that runs between Howrah and Hatia in India
- Kriya (company) (Kriya Finance Limited), a British business finance lender
