= Leisure Seizure =

Studio album by Tom Vek
- Released: 6 June 2011
- Recorded: 2010; London
- Genre: Indietronica, indie rock, dance-punk
- Length: 47:24
- Label: Island

Tom Vek chronology
Live from London (2005)	Leisure Seizure (2011)	Luck (2014)

Singles from Leisure Seizure
- 1. "A Chore" Released: 18 April 2011

Professional ratings
Review scores
Source	Rating
Allmusic	link
Pitchfork Media	(6.2/10) link
Slant Magazine	link

Leisure Seizure is the second studio album by rock artist Tom Vek. It was released in 2011 on Island Records. The first single "A Chore" was released on 18 April 2011.

== Track listing ==
No.	Title	Length
1.	"Hold Your Hand"	3:38
2.	"Aroused"	3:31
3.	"A Chore"	3:47
4.	"We Do Nothing"	4:01
5.	"World of Doubt"	3:05
6.	"Seizemic"	4:00
7.	"A.P.O.L.O.G.Y."	4:36
8.	"Someone Loves You"	3:35
9.	"Close Mic'ed"	5:46
10.	"On a Plate"	3:38
11.	"You Need to Work Your Heart Out"	3:57
12.	"Too Bad"	3:50
