= Tsugi =

Tsugi may refer to:

- Ghost-Cat of Gojusan-Tsugi, a 1956 Japanese film directed by Bin Kado
- Firework Thrower Kantaro's 53 Stations of the Tokaido, a 1986 video game
- Thomas Tsugi (1571–1627), Japanese Jesuit preacher
- Tsugi Takano, female novelist from Hamamatsu in Shizuoka prefecture, Japan
