= Dan Croll =

English singer-songwriter

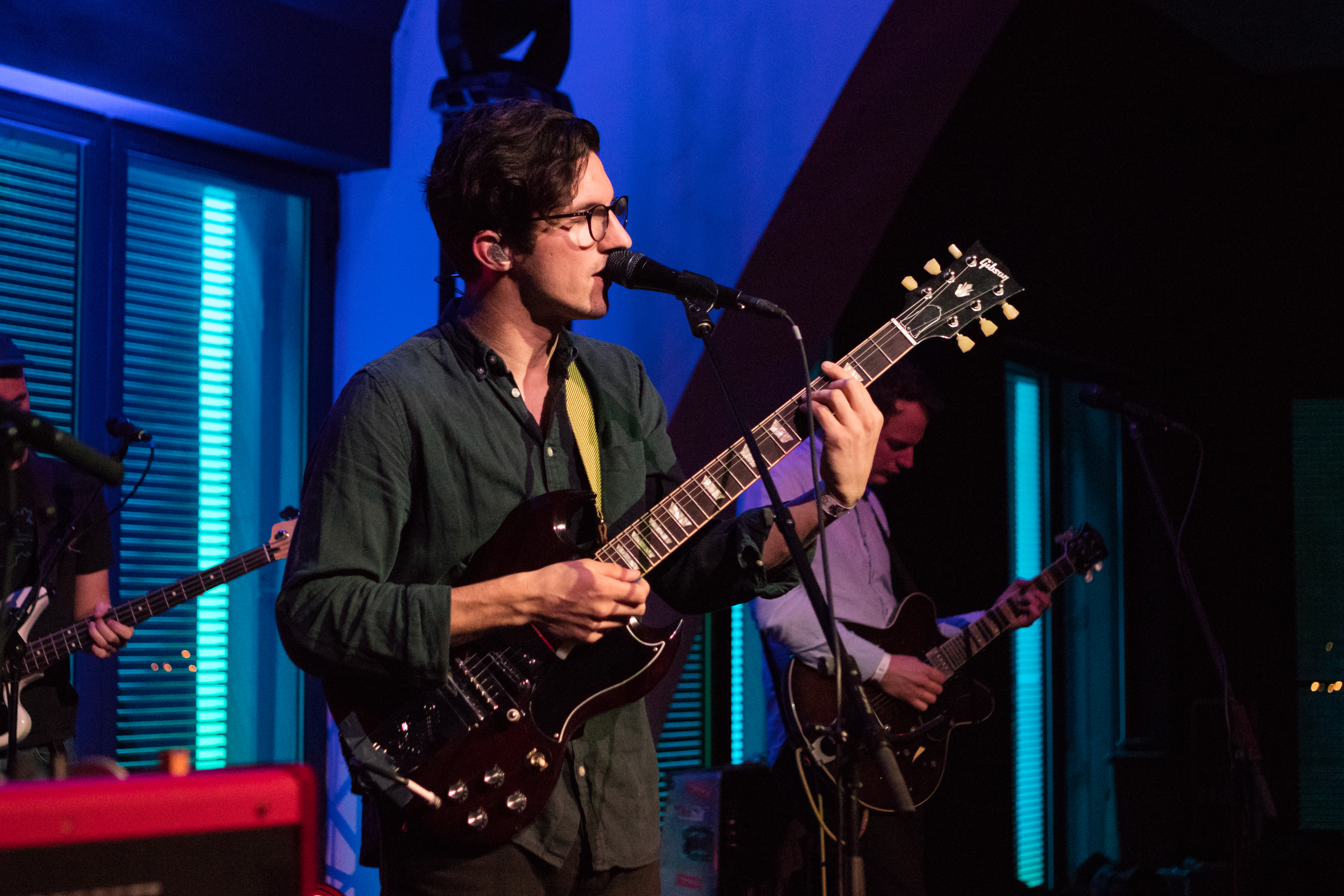
- Dan Croll in 2017

Background information
- Born: Daniel Francis Croll; 18 July 1990 (age 36); Newcastle-under-Lyme, Staffordshire, England
- Origin: Stoke-on-Trent, Staffordshire, England
- Genres: Indie rock; folktronica; pop rock; indie pop; soft rock
- Occupation: Singer-songwriter
- Instruments: Guitar; trumpet; piano; bass guitar; percussion
- Years active: 2010—present
- Labels: Turn First Records; Deram Records; Decca Records; Capitol Records; Communion Records
- Website: dancroll.com

Daniel Francis Croll (born 18 July 1990) is an English singer-songwriter. He is known for his songs "From Nowhere," "Compliment Your Soul," "Home," and "Yesterday." Often associated with indie pop and folktronica, his work also spans indie folk, folk-pop, rock music, and 1970s-style R&B and soft rock. In 2011 he was named Songwriter of the Year by the Musicians' Benevolent Fund while attending the Liverpool Institute for Performing Arts. His debut single, "From Nowhere," was released in 2012 and achieved commercial success. Croll followed it with 2014's full-length album Sweet Disarray. He has since released the albums Emerging Adulthood (2017), Grand Plan (2020), and Fools (2023), as well as the EP On Top (2021).

== Career ==
=== Early career ===
Born in Newcastle-under-Lyme in Staffordshire, Croll moved to Liverpool when he was 18 to attend the Liverpool Institute for Performing Arts (LIPA). While at LIPA, he won the national Songwriter of the Year award from the Musicians' Benevolent Fund and was one of eight students picked to have a one-to-one with LIPA founder Sir Paul McCartney. He wrote his 2020 track "Yesterday" about the experience of meeting McCartney.

=== 2012–2015 ===
Croll signed to Turn First Records in 2012. His debut single, "From Nowhere," was released worldwide on 24 September 2012 via Turn First / Racquet Records (Croll's own imprint) as a digital download and limited 7". "From Nowhere" spent 3 days at the top of the Hype Machine popular charts, was playlisted in the UK on BBC 6 Music, XFM and Amazing Radio, and received spot plays on BBC Radio 1. The song also received airplay in the US, reaching #36 on the Billboard Alternative chart. Croll was named a Guardian New Band of the Day in November 2012 and described as "Paul Simon jamming with Prince. Very nice."

Croll released his second single "Compliment Your Soul" in March 2013. This was followed up by the release of "In/Out" in July 2013.

On 13 October 2013, Croll released the song "Home" on his own VEVO channel on YouTube. On 29 October 2013, during an on-air Virgin Radio interview, Croll confirmed he had finished recording his full-length debut album. The LP was expected to be released early in 2014.

His song "Compliment Your Soul" was included in the soundtrack for the video game FIFA 14. While his song From Nowhere’s remix by Andrew Baardsen was featured in a radio station in Grand Theft Auto V.

On 19 April 2014 for Record Store Day, Croll released a limited 10" orange vinyl featuring 2 unreleased songs. Side A featured "Hello My Baby" (featuring Ladysmith Black Mambazo) which was backed with "Ever at Your Side". Croll went to Durban to record "Hello My Baby" with the group. The limited vinyl was released in independent record stores on the day.

=== 2015–present: Subsequent releases ===
In September 2015, Croll released the single "One of Us." In June 2016, Croll announced that he had signed with Communion Music.

The electro-song "Swim" was released on 25 August 2016 through the label. The music video for "Swim" was released on 31 August 2016. Croll's second studio album Emerging Adulthood was released on 21 July 2017. The album was produced by Ben H. Allen.

In 2018, Croll relocated from Liverpool to Los Angeles. In 2019/2020, he began working with producer Matthew E. White at his Spacebomb Studios in Richmond, Virginia. In early 2020, multiple new songs were released, and a third album named Grand Plan was announced on 15 April via social media. It was released on 21 August 2020. In 2021, he released a live version of the album, recorded at Spacebomb. Later that year, Croll released the four-track EP On Top. Released in July 2021 via Communion, it was also produced and recorded with Matthew E. White.

== Discography ==
=== Studio albums ===
Title	Album details	Peak positions	
Title	Album details	UK	SCO
Sweet Disarray	Released: 10 March 2014; Label: Deram, Universal; Formats: LP, CD, digital	26	53
Emerging Adulthood	Released: 21 July 2017; Label: Communion Group; Formats: LP, CD, digital	—	—
Grand Plan	Released: 21 August 2020; Label: Communion Group; Formats: LP, CD, digital	—	—
Fools	Released: 19 May 2023; Label: Communion Group; Formats: LP, CD, digital	—	—
Winning Streak	Releasing: 9 October 2026; Label: Kartel Music Group; Formats: LP, CD, digital	—	—

=== Studio EPs ===
Title	Album details
From Nowhere EP	Released: 2012; reissued: 2013; Label: self-released; Lava, Republic Records; Formats: 10", CD, digital
On Top	Released: 23 July 2021; Label: Communion Group; Formats: digital

=== Live albums ===
Title	Album details
Spotify Session	Released: 2013; Label: Decca; Formats: digital
iTunes Festival: London 2013	Released: 1 January 2014; Label: Decca; Formats: digital
Grand Plan (Live)	Released: 29 June 2021; Label: Communion Group; Formats: digital

=== Remix albums ===
- In / Out (Turnfirst / Decca, 2013)
- Nobody Knows (Remixes) (Decca, 2014)
- Home (Remixes) (Decca, 2014)
- From Nowhere (Remixes) (Decca, 2014)
- Tokyo EP (2017)

=== Singles ===
Title	Year	Format	Album
"From Nowhere"	2012	Digital, 7"	Sweet Disarray
"Compliment Your Soul"	2013	Digital	Sweet Disarray
"In/Out"	2013	Digital	Sweet Disarray
"Home"	2013	Digital, 7"	Sweet Disarray
"Hello My Baby" (featuring Ladysmith Black Mambazo) / "Ever at Your Side"	2014	10" (RSD)	Sweet Disarray (Deluxe)
"Nobody Knows" (featuring The Very Best)	2014	Digital	Sweet Disarray (Deluxe)
"One of Us"	2015	Digital	Emerging Adulthood
"Swim"	2016	Digital	Emerging Adulthood
"Be Alone"	2016	Digital	Non-album single
"Away From Today"	2017	Digital	Emerging Adulthood
"Bad Boy"	2017	Digital	Emerging Adulthood
"So Dark (Live)"	2021	Digital	Grand Plan (Live)
"Surreal (Live)"	2021	Digital	Grand Plan (Live)
"On Top"	2021	Digital	On Top
"Big One"	2021	Digital	On Top
"Home - Piano Version"	2021	Digital	Non-album single
"How Close We Came"	2022	Digital	Fools
"Slip Away"	2023	Digital	Fools
"Talk To You"	2023	Digital	Fools
"Second Guess"	2023	Digital	Fools
"California"	2026	Digital	Winning Streak
"Hail Mary"	2026	Digital	Winning Streak
"All To Be Loved By You"	2026	Digital	Winning Streak

=== Guest appearances ===
Title	Year	Other artist(s)	Album
"Marion"	2012	N/A	Communion: New Faces
"A Place Called World"	2014	John Legend, Nach, Anni B Sweet	A Place Called World
"A Place Called World (The Zombie Kids Remix)"	2014	John Legend, Nach, Ani B Sweet, The Zombie Kids	A Place Called World
"From Nowhere (Baardsen Remix)"	2014	N/A	The Music Of Grand Theft Auto V – Vol. 3: The Soundtrack
"Honey Sweet - Dan Croll Remix"	2017	Blossoms	Honey Sweet (Remixes)
"Grand Plan - 414 Demo"	2020	N/A	A Little Bit At A Time: Spacebomb Family Rarities
