= Grandadbob =

British electronic music duo

- Origin: United Kingdom
- Genres: Trip hop, dance, electronic
- Years active: 2000–present
- Labels: Southern Fried Records
- Members: Vanessa Robinson; Dave Johnson

Grandadbob are Vanessa Robinson and Dave Johnson, from Sheffield, UK. Their music consists of electronic house, pop and trip hop. The name Grandadbob comes from Vanessa's grandfather, Robert Porter, who pronounces himself at the end of the track "Monster" on Waltzes for Weirdoes as "The real Grandad Bob". They recorded a radio session for Sheffield's Radio2XS in 2004, and a session for BBC Radio 6 in 2003 which was also broadcast in 2012.

== Discography ==
- Mudwiggle (1999)
- Let's Sick on the Decks (2002)
- Waltzes for Weirdoes (2003)
- Garden of Happiness (2006)
- Hide Me (2006)
