= Tom Vek =

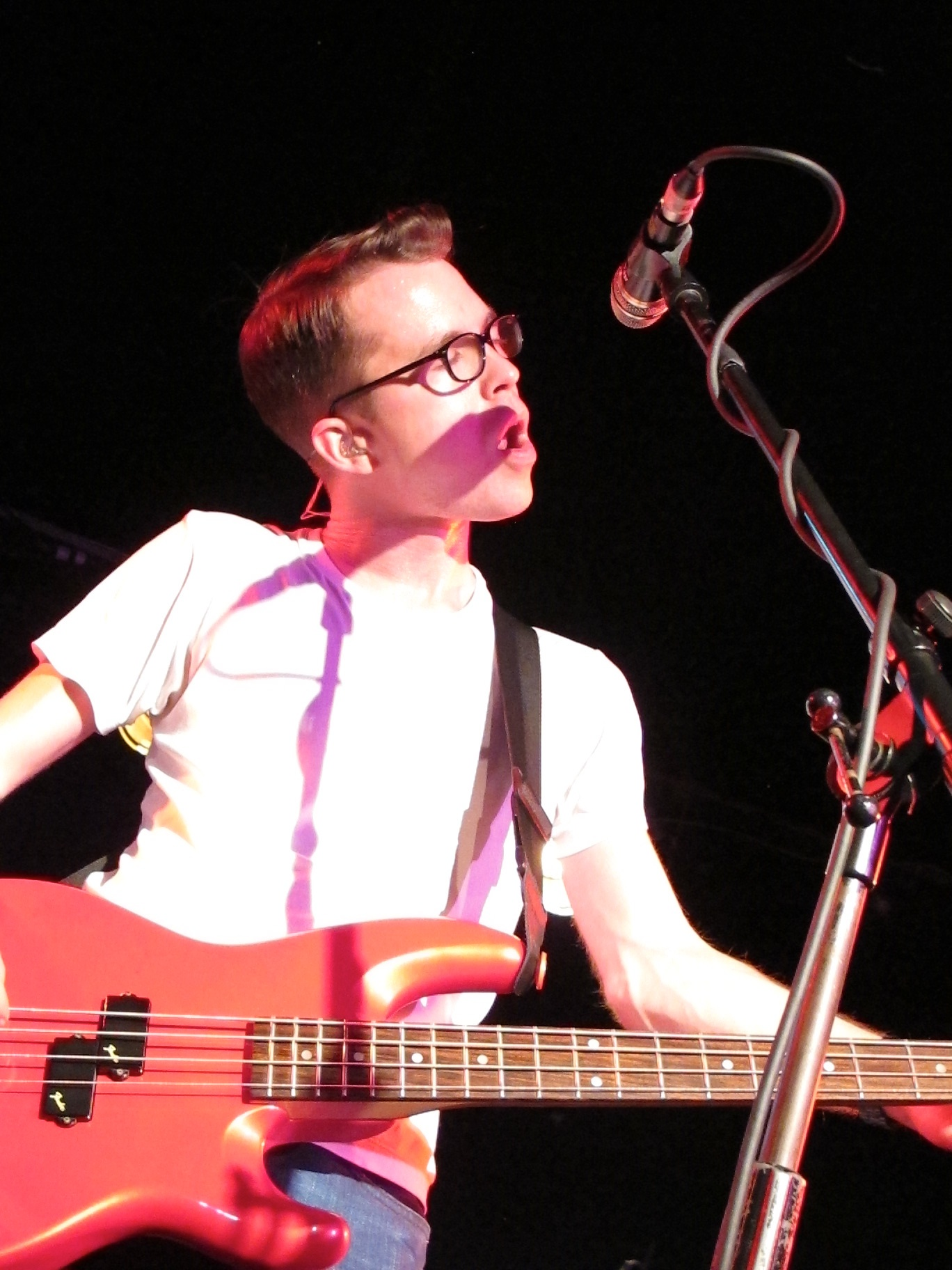
- Tom Vek (2011)

Background information
- Born: Thomas Timothy Vernon-Kell; 10 May 1981 (age 45); Hounslow, London, England
- Genres: Post-punk revival; dance-punk; alternative rock; indietronica; indie rock; indie pop
- Years active: 2004–present
- Labels: Moshi Moshi (current); Tummy Touch, Startime International, Island Records (former)
- Website: tomvek.com

Thomas Timothy Vernon-Kell (born 10 May 1981) is an English multi-instrumentalist musician who works under the name of Tom Vek.

== Career ==
Born in Hounslow, London, England, he signed to the small label Tummy Touch Records in 2001, having spent the previous eight years writing and recording in his parents' garage.

Vek's debut album We Have Sound was recorded whilst he completed a graphic design degree. The album was finished in mid-2004 but was not released until 2005 when Island Records licensed it through Go! Beat Records. The record was subsequently licensed through Universal Records to Startime International for a North American release.

Vek made a guest appearance on the television programme The OC, where he performed a gig at 'The Bait Shop' venue; the third-season episode 'The Road Warrior' featured his track "I Ain't Saying My Goodbyes". He also contributed to the Grand Theft Auto IV soundtrack, with "One Horse Race" which was the B-side to his single, "Nothing but Green Lights".

Vek released his second album, Leisure Seizure, in 2011 after a six-year absence from the music industry. The first single from the album, "A Chore", had its Radio 1 debut on Zane Lowe's show on 18 April that year. In 2012, his song "Aroused" from the album was featured on the soundtrack of Forza Horizon. Also in 2011, he was guest vocalist on the album track, and single, "Warning Call", on DJ Shadow's The Less You Know, the Better.

On 11 April 2014, Vek announced his third album, Luck, along with the release of the album's first single, 'Sherman (Animals in the Jungle)'. Luck was finally released in June 2014 to mixed reviews. NME said about the album "There are flashes of brilliance but the singer's third album misfires too often" while the Guardian was more favourable, describing it as "deliciously unpredictable"

On 12 November 2020, Vek announced his fourth album, New Symbols, and Sleevenote, a music player device he designed.

On 8 August 2022, Vek released a Newer Symbols, a "full re-work" of New Symbols. Each track of Newer Symbols shares its name with a track from New Symbols, with the word "new" added. Vek also made an NFT available for each track.

== Discography ==
=== Studio albums ===
Year	Title	Peak positions
Year	Title	UK
2005	We Have Sound: Released: 4 April 2005; Label: Tummy Touch/Go! Beat Records	73
2011	Leisure Seizure: Released: 6 June 2011; Label: Island Records	79
2014	Luck: Released: 9 June 2014; Label: Moshi Moshi Records	-
2015	We Have Sound (10th Anniversary Edition): Released: 10 July 2015; Label: Tummy Touch Records	-
2020	New Symbols: Released: 12 November 2020; Label: Moshi Moshi Records	-
2022	Newer Symbols: Released: 8 August 2022; Label: Moshi Moshi Records	-

=== EPs ===
Year	Title
2005	Live from London: Released: 7 June 2005; Recorded: 31 May 2005; Format: Digital download (iTunes)

=== Singles ===
Year	Title	Peak positions	Album
Year	Title	UK	Album
2004	"If I Had Changed My Mind": Released: 3 May 2004; Formats: 7"	—	We Have Sound
2004	"If I Had Changed My Mind Remix"/"Your Love Is Gum": Split single with Coco Electrik; Released: 25 June 2004; Formats: 12"	—	—
2004	"If You Want": Released: 1 November 2004; Formats: CD, 7", 12"	90	We Have Sound
2005	"I Ain't Saying My Goodbyes": Released: 21 March 2005; Formats: CD, 7", 12"	45	We Have Sound
2005	"C-C (You Set The Fire in Me)": Released: 20 June 2005; Formats: CD, 2x7"	60	We Have Sound
2005	"Nothing But Green Lights": Released: 24 October 2005; Formats: CD, 7", 12"	59	We Have Sound
2011	"A Chore": Released: 18 April 2011; Formats: Digital download (iTunes)	—	Leisure Seizure
2011	"Someone Loves You": Released: November 2011; Formats: Digital download (iTunes)	—	Leisure Seizure
2012	"You'll Stay": Released: 27 April 2012; Formats: Digital download (iTunes)	—	—
2014	"Sherman (Animals in the Jungle)": Released: 11 April 2014; Formats: Digital download (iTunes)	—	Tom Vek - Luck
