= Ultrafox =

German electropop band

- Origin: "Somewhere in Europe"
- Genres: Electropop
- Years active: 2001 - present
- Label: Loser Friendly Records
- Spinoff of: Sneaker Pimps
- Members: Claudia Holzer; Connie Holzer; David Westlake
- Past members: Liam Howe; Joe Wilson

Ultrafox is an electropop band formed by German twins Claudia and Connie Holzer. Liam Howe and Joe Wilson of Sneaker Pimps were also involved in the band's creation. The band was formed in 2001, and their only album, Ice Skating, was released in June 2004. Since then, Howe and Wilson have stopped playing with the band due to other commitments, and David Westlake, also of Sneaker Pimps, has been working with them.

== Creation ==
Ultrafox formed when the Holzers met Howe and Wilson "somewhere in Europe" and decided to make an album as quickly as possible, since all their favourite albums had been made in a short time. The album, Ice Skating, was made in two weeks in Munich and London.

The name, a take on the 1980s new wave band Ultravox, was decided on by Howe and Wilson, since Howe is a great fan of the band.

== Touring ==
Ultrafox has undertaken one European tour. They played in the Notting Hill Arts Club in London on 8 June 2004 (their first ever live performance), and the following day in "Shelter" in Vienna. Before the event they had only 20 hours practice - most big bands have up to a month before live performances. This was the first time David Westlake performed with them, playing drums.

The tour was a success, although problems plagued both nights. In London, since the stage had recently been repositioned, the sound system was incorrectly set up resulting in the backing track being too quiet (at one point the band stopped playing and listened to the crowd's conversation instead until the sound engineer could adjust the volume). In Vienna, excessive rain threatened to flood the venue, and indeed succeeded in flooding the toilets. The performance nevertheless went ahead and was well received.

Ultrafox later played in Client's gig "Being Boiled" in November 2004, again at the Notting Hill Arts Club.

== Style ==
Ultrafox has been said to have a unique sound, described by Connie as "dark, sophisticated electronic sounds" and Claudia as "minimalistic, catchy and groovy". Their songs have a mix of German and English lyrics, and are usually based around a broken drum beat and a strong bass line. (On the track "I Get Lifted", the bass line is taken from Jeff Wayne's musical version of The War of the Worlds).

They have been influenced by the likes of Kraftwerk, Michael Jackson, Def Leppard, Daft Punk and The Beach Boys.

== Current plans ==
Ultrafox moved to London sometime after making Ice Skating, where recording studios and facilities for photography are more accessible. They stated they had begun working on a second album, but it has yet to materialise.

== Discography ==
- Ice Skating 2004 (album)
- Cloakroom Girl (single)
- The Black Label (remixes)
