= Joe Wilson (musician) =

British record producer and musician

- Born: Joseph Roy Chester Wilson; 1 February 1973 (age 53)
- Occupations: Professor, musician
- Instruments: Guitar, bass, programming, synthesizer

Joseph Roy Chester Wilson is a British record producer and musician best known for his work with Sneaker Pimps. He has exhibited at the Institute of Contemporary Arts in London and The CCA in Glasgow. as well as producing music for films for Channel 4 and the BBC. He also has worked with Simon Faithfull on the film 13.

He has produced for Sneaker Pimps, Client, Trash Money and occasionally produces remixes and music as Omega Man for artists such as IAMX. Along with Liam Howe, he wrote and produced an album for the German twins Claudia and Connie Holzer as Ultrafox. Currently along with Chris Tate, he writes and produces for the band Trash Money. Trash Money received a 4 out 5 review in The Guardian. He was also a lecturer at the University of Gloucestershire in Popular Music. until he made the move to Leeds college of Music in 2012. He was profiled by the Times Higher Education in 2007. Trash Money's track "Million Pound Note", was used in the trailer for the 2010 film The A-Team. In 2013, he left the University of Gloucestershire. He is now Principal of Leeds College of Music, a conservatoire specialising in popular music, production, classical and jazz. He was made a Professor in 2014.
