= Jim Abbiss =

British music producer

- Born: Jeremy Abbiss
- Occupations: Producer; mixer; engineer
- Years active: 1986–present

Jim Abbiss is a British music producer, best known for his work on records including the debut album of Editors (The Back Room), Arctic Monkeys' Mercury Music Prize winning debut album, Whatever People Say I Am, That's What I'm Not, Kasabian's Kasabian and Empire, Ladytron's Witching Hour and Ladytron, Sneaker Pimps' debut Becoming X, and Adele's 19, and 21.

== Career ==
Starting his music career, Abbiss played keyboards with Peterborough band the Pleasure Heads, on Red Rhino Records, before getting his first studio job at Spaceward Studios near Cambridge, in 1986. It was here that he trained under maverick engineer & producer Owen Morris. He moved to become an assistant engineer at Power Plant studios, London in 1988, and witnessed first-hand the acid house movement through countless remix sessions.

Abbiss went freelance in 1990, and Steve Hillage became a regular collaborator on remixes & album sessions. He then met producer Nellee Hooper, and worked as his engineer on albums for Björk (Debut), Massive Attack (Protection), as well as the Romeo + Juliet soundtrack & many more remixes. This association established Abbiss and led to a meeting and future collaborations with James Lavelle & DJ Shadow. More remixing (The Verve - Bitter Sweet Symphony) and the critically acclaimed Psyence Fiction album by Unkle led to him being offered more production work. He co-produced the Sneaker Pimps debut, Becoming X, and the debut and only album by Mono, Formica Blues. At the same time, song-writing with singer Laura Mohapi led to a publishing contract with Chrysalis Music, and a short-lived return to the world of the artist with the band Darling.

Abbiss has also worked with Stateless on their self-titled debut album Stateless. Other work includes both EPs and debut single by Bombay Bicycle Club, as well as on their debut album I Had the Blues But I Shook Them Loose. He has also mixed DJ Shadow's albums The Less You Know, the Better. and The Private Press.

Mixing tracks for Kasabian in 2003 led to co-producing 2 albums with them (the self-titled Kasabian and Empire), and gave Abbiss the first of 3 nominations for "producer of the year" at the Music Week/MPG awards. He then worked on Editors (The Back Room), The Noisettes (Wild Young Hearts) and The Temper Trap (Conditions). While producing the track "My Yvonne" for Jack Peñate, he met singer Adele, whom Jack had asked to do some backing vocals. He was immediately blown away by her voice and asked if she had her own demos. She had just signed to XL, and shortly afterwards Abbiss began work on her debut 19, producing eight tracks. Producing two tracks for her phenomenally successful follow-up 21 led to a Grammy nomination.

In 2011, Abbiss worked on The Kooks' third album, Junk of the Heart.

In 2012, Abbiss produced The Unified Field for former Sneaker Pimps vocalist and founding member Chris Corner's project IAMX. Abbiss has continued studio productions with Emeli Sandé, Peace, The Family Rain, Birdy & KT Tunstall and maintains ongoing projects with a variety of artists.

In 2016, Abbiss co-produced the Blind Spot (EP) for the band Lush.

In 2020, Abbiss produced Amy Macdonald's fifth studio album The Human Demands.

== Main productions ==
- Adele: 19, 21
- Arctic Monkeys: Whatever People Say I Am, That's What I'm Not
- Birdy: Birdy
- Bombay Bicycle Club: I Had the Blues But I Shook Them Loose
- Editors: The Back Room
- Kasabian: Kasabian, Empire
- KT Tunstall: Tiger Suit
- Ladytron: Witching Hour
- Noisettes: Wild Young Hearts
- Placebo: Sleeping with Ghosts
- Sneaker Pimps: Becoming X
- Stateless: Stateless
- The Kooks: Junk of the Heart
- The Temper Trap: Conditions
- The Music: The Music
