= Sneaker Pimps =

English electronic music band

- Origin: Hartlepool, County Durham, England
- Genres: Electronic; trip hop; dance-rock; downtempo
- Years active: 1994–2005; 2015–present
- Labels: Clean Up; Virgin; Tommy Boy; Unfall
- Members: Liam Howe; Chris Corner
- Past members: Kelli Dayton; Joe Wilson; Dave Westlake
- Website: sneakerpimpsmusic.com

Sneaker Pimps are an English electronic music band, formed in Hartlepool in 1994. They are best known for their debut album, Becoming X (1996), and its singles "6 Underground" and "Spin Spin Sugar". The band's name is derived from an article the Beastie Boys published in their Grand Royal magazine about a man they hired to acquire classic sneakers.

The band was founded by electronic musician Liam Howe and guitarist Chris Corner. They later recruited Kelli Ali (then known as Kelli Dayton) as lead singer, plus guitarist Joe Wilson and drummer Dave Westlake as backup musicians. After Becoming X, the band decided to replace Ali with Corner on vocals. Wilson and Westlake departed in 2002. In 2016 Howe and Corner revived the group after a lengthy hiatus. In 2021, they began releasing new music.

== History ==
Chris Corner and Liam Howe met as teenagers in the 1980s, both taking an interest in recording and studio experimentation. They banded together under the name F.R.I.S.K. and produced the Soul of Indiscretion EP, an early example of what became known as trip hop. The mix of beats and acoustic folk sounds was further explored on two more instrumental EPs: F.R.I.S.K. and World as a Cone. They were signed to Clean Up Records. The duo also worked as DJs and producers under the name Line of Flight.

Howe and Corner launched Sneaker Pimps as a recording group in 1994. The following year, they recruited Ian Pickering to help write lyrics for what would become Sneaker Pimps' debut album, Becoming X. Corner recorded vocals for several demo tracks, but the band decided the kind of music they were writing would better suit a female voice. At their manager's suggestion, they saw Kelli Ali (then known as Kelli Dayton) performing in a pub with her band The Lumieres, and invited her to sing on some demos, including an early version of "6 Underground". She soon joined the band, and the demos won the group a contract with Virgin Records. The group was presented as a trio featuring Howe, Corner, and Ali, while bassist Joe Wilson and drummer Dave Westlake were added as supporting musicians. Influences included Massive Attack, Portishead, Tricky, Kraftwerk and Orchestral Manoeuvres in the Dark.

Released in 1996, Becoming X sold over one million copies. The band toured for two years to support the album, including gigs alongside Aphex Twin. A "grueling" tour of the US strained relations within the band, and Howe left the tour prematurely. A remix album, Becoming Remixed, followed in 1998.

Howe and Corner then developed their own studio, also called Line of Flight after their earlier production work, and began sessions for the second Sneaker Pimps album. Kelli Ali had taken a break after the Becoming X tour and was away traveling, so Corner sang on the new demos. When Ali returned, she was told by Howe and Corner that her voice was no longer considered suitable for their new music, and that Corner's voice was a better fit. Due to other ongoing personality conflicts and the band's concern about being stereotyped as a faddish female-fronted trip-hop act, Ali was fired and Corner took over on lead vocals.

This significant lineup change caused Virgin Records to drop the band. Their second album Splinter was released in the UK on Clean Up Records in 1999, and failed to match the commercial success of Becoming X. New songs were premiered during a 2001 European tour opening for Placebo. Their third album Bloodsport was released on Tommy Boy Records in 2002. Howe and Corner also gained notice by writing and producing for other artists, including Natalie Imbruglia, and for remixing songs under the name Line of Flight.

In 2002, Joe Wilson and Dave Westlake left Sneaker Pimps. In 2003, a fourth Sneaker Pimps album was demoed but shelved. The album, which started as the soundtrack for an abandoned indie film project called Blind Michael, is referred to in fan circles as SP4. Corner then launched the solo project IAMX, which included several songs from the SP4 project. After some additional cancelled projects, in 2006 Howe and Corner recorded some new demo tracks with an unidentified female singer; the tracks turned up on a MiniDisc found in a bar in Russia and are referred to by fans as SP5 demos. The tracks were leaked online and were later confirmed to be legitimate new Sneaker Pimps songs.

After several years of side projects, Howe hinted in 2015 that Sneaker Pimps may reform. Corner confirmed the reunion in 2016, and as of early 2019 they were reportedly working on a new album. Deluxe box sets of previous albums and two new studio albums were announced to be released variously across 2021.

In May 2021, the band announced a new album entitled Squaring the Circle. The album was produced at Sawtooth Studios in Pioneertown, California and The Tower Studios in London. Main vocals are shared by Corner and "featured artist" Simonne Jones. Five of the songs originate from the SP5 demos, "Lifeline" (originally "Samaritan"), "Child in the Dark" (originally "Satellite"), So Far Gone (originally "Sun Ate the Moon"), "Come Like the Cure" (originally "Elias") and "No Show" (originally "Rush").

== Members ==
In the studio, the band regularly swapped instruments. As Corner explained during the recording sessions for Bloodsport, "we tend towards jobs, but generally we can mix and match. If we get bored of one aspect, someone else jumps in the seat. Gone are the days where it’s like 'You’re the drummer, I’m the synth player." When playing live, however, their roles were more fixed:

=== Current members ===
- Chris Corner - vocals, guitars, keyboards
- Liam Howe - keyboards, synths, programming, guitars, percussion
- Simonne Jones (main vocals, backing vocals and spoken word lyrics on Squaring the Circle)

=== Former members ===
- Kelli Ali (vocals on Becoming X)
- Joe Wilson (bass, guitars, backing vocals)
- Dave Westlake (drums, percussion)

=== Additional contributors ===
- Ian Pickering (lyrics; live synths, bass and vocals in 2003)

=== Former contributors ===
- Cathy Davey (backing vocals on Squaring the Circle)
- Sue Denim (backing vocals and occasional lyrics)
- Zoe Durrant (backing vocals)
- Janine Gezang (IAMX, backing vocals on Squaring the Circle)
- Sarah McDonnell (backing vocals)
- Chris Tate (occasional live keyboards)
- Noel Fielding (occasional live guitar)

== Discography ==
=== Studio albums ===
Title	Album details	Peak chart positions								Certifications
Title	Album details	UK	UK Indie	AUS	AUT	CAN	SCO	US	US Heat.	Certifications
Becoming X	Released: 19 August 1996; Label: Clean-up (CUP020); Formats: CD, LP, CS	27	—	55	—	80	47	111	1	BPI: Gold
Splinter	Released: 25 October 1999; Label: Clean-up (CUP040); Formats: CD, LP	80	13	—	—	—	—	—	—	
Bloodsport	Released: 22 January 2002; Label: Tommy Boy (TB1532); Formats: CD, LP	—	—	—	68	—	—	—	—	
Squaring the Circle	Released: 10 September 2021; Label: Unfall (ORP006); Formats: CD, Digital, LP	—	—	—	—	—	—	—	—	
"—" denotes items that did not chart or were not released in that territory.

=== EPs ===
- Low Five (digital remix EP) (2005)
- Loretta Young Silks (digital remix EP) (2005)
- Rework Collection 1 (2021)
- Rework Collection 2 (2021)
- Rework Collection 3 (2022)
- Rework Collection 4 (2022)

=== Singles ===
Year	Title	Peak chart positions										Certifications	Album
Year	Title	UK	UK Dance	UK Indie	AUS	CAN Dance	EUR	SCO	US	US Dance	US Alt.	Certifications	Album
1996	"Tesko Suicide"	—	—	—	—	—	—	—	—	—	—		Becoming X
1996	"Roll On"	—	—	—	—	—	—	—	—	—	—		Becoming X
1996	"6 Underground"	15	—	—	62	—	—	17	45	—	7	BPI: Silver	Becoming X
1997	"Spin Spin Sugar"	21	1	—	126	2	67	28	87	2	—		Becoming X
1997	"6 Underground" (re-issue)	9	10	—	—	—	67	11	—	—	—		Becoming X
1997	"Post-Modern Sleaze"	22	4	—	143	—	—	22	—	—	—		Becoming X
1998	"Spin Spin Sugar" (re-issue)	46	3	9	—	—	—	70	—	—	—		Becoming X
1999	"Low Five"	39	23	8	—	—	—	47	—	—	—		Splinter
1999	"Ten to Twenty"	56	38	9	—	—	—	68	—	—	—		Splinter
2001	"7th High" (with Double 99)	114	—	—	—	—	—	—	—	—	—		
2002	"Sick"	100	—	24	—	—	—	—	—	16	—		Bloodsport
2002	"Bloodsport"	—	—	—	—	—	—	—	—	—	—		Bloodsport
2002	"Loretta Young Silks"	—	—	—	—	—	—	—	—	—	—		Bloodsport
2021	"Squaring the Circle"	—	—	—	—	—	—	—	—	—	—		Squaring the Circle
2021	"Fighter"	—	—	—	—	—	—	—	—	—	—		Squaring the Circle
2021	"Alibis"	—	—	—	—	—	—	—	—	—	—		Squaring the Circle
2022	"Love Me Stupid" (Simonne Jones Remix)	—	—	—	—	—	—	—	—	—	—		Rework Collection 3
"—" denotes items that did not chart or were not released in that territory.

=== Promo singles ===
- 2002 "Kiro TV"
- 2002 "M'Aidez"

=== Other appearances ===
- "Long Hard Road out of Hell", a collaboration with Marilyn Manson on the Spawn Soundtrack (1997)
- "Velvet Divorce", a song on the A Life Less Ordinary Soundtrack (1997)

=== Music videos ===
Year	Title	Director	Notes
1996	"Tesko Suicide"	Liam Howe and Joe Wilson	Released on the 2001 DVD The Videos.
1996	"Spin Spin Sugar"	Toby Tremlett	Released on the 2001 DVD The Videos.
1997	"6 Underground"	Toby Tremlett	Released on the 2001 DVD The Videos.
1997	"Post-Modern Sleaze"	Howard Greenhalgh	Released on the 2001 DVD The Videos.
1999	"Low Five"	Tom Gidley	Released on the 2001 DVD The Videos.
2002	"Sick"	Simon Smyth	
2002	"Loretta Young Silks"	Liam Howe	Featuring Honor Blackman
2004	"First and Careless Rapture"	Chris Corner	Unreleased
2004	"Missile" (do not confuse with IAMX single)	Unknown	Unreleased
2021	"Fighter"	Chris Corner	Featuring Janine Gezang (IAMX) as fighter.
2021	"Alibis"	Chris Corner	"A combination of animated still scanned photography and macro video."
2022	"Love Me Stupid (Simonne Jones Remix)"	Chris Corner	
