= Dawn Okoro =

American painter

- Born: Dawn Okoro; 1980 (age 45–46); Houston, Texas
- Education: University of Texas at Austin
- Known for: Painting

Dawn Okoro (born 1980 in Houston), is a Nigerian American artist who paints figurative art works, as well as practices photography and videography, all inspired by fashion and popular culture. She graduated from University of Texas-Austin in 2002 with a B.A. in Psychology and Fashion Design and graduated with a law degree from the Thurgood Marshall School of Law at Texas Southern University in 2009.

Okoro currently lives and works in Austin, Texas, but her work has been exhibited throughout the United States and internationally, and has also been commissioned by celebrities.

== Biography ==
Born to an American mother and a Nigerian father from the Igbo tribe, Okoro was raised in Lubbock, Texas.

Okoro has participated in both solo and group exhibitions throughout her career.

In 2008, Dawn's art works headlined Visual Collaborative's Miami exhibition. In June 2019, she returned as a feature on the platform, under the Voyager series for humanities, she was interviewed alongside 25 people from around the world such as; Seun Kuti, Berla Mundi and Aya Chebbi.

Since 2012, Dawn Okoro has split her time as both an artist and digital producer at Spectrum News Austin.

In 2018, Okoro's solo exhibition "Punk noir" was held at the George Washington Carver Museum and Cultural Center. The exhibition featured life-size paintings of local artists and creatives and explored "black personal style as a punk ethos." In 2019, Okoro was one of five artists featured in the 'Fruits of Naij' exhibition at Okay Space in Brooklyn. The show celebrated the endeavors of Nigerian artists raising awareness about the conditions of internally displaced persons in Nigeria.
