= Rocking horse (disambiguation) =

A rocking horse is a toy made in the shape of a horse with rockers on the bottom of its legs.

Rocking horse or Rockinghorse may also refer to:

- Rocking Horse (film), a 1978 film by Yaky Yosha
- Rockinghorse, a 1992 album by Alannah Myles
- Rocking Horse (album), a 2008 album by Kelli Ali
- "Rocking Horse", a song by Gov't Mule from the album Gov't Mule
  - "Rockin' Horse", a re-recording of "Rocking Horse" by The Allman Brothers Band from the album Hittin' the Note
- Rocking Horse Studio, an American production company
- "Rocking Horse", a painting featured in the 2007 Indian film Welcome
