= Visual Collaborative =

American festival and publishing platform

- Logo since 2011
- Status: Active
- Genre: Conference, Pop-up exhibitions and digital properties
- Frequency: Seasonal
- Venue: Various locations, Online
- Headquarters: New York City, United States
- Years active: 20
- Inaugurated: 2007
- Founder: Olufeko
- Organized by: Visual Collaborative, LLC (Minneapolis) (2007–2023; dissolved); International joint venture; Publishing only (2024-Present)

Electronic Publishing
- Categories: Lifestyle; Innovation
- First issue: April 5, 2019
- Language: English (Some articles in French or Spanish)
- ISSN: 2642-9780
- OCLC: 1096432925
- Website: visualcollaborative.com

Visual Collaborative is an American festival and publishing platform highlighting the intersections of people, commerce, and innovation. The platform organizes exhibitions that feature talks, art, technology, development, and live music performances. Over the years, the initiative has grown in scope and size, supporting initiatives related to sustainability, development, and innovation.

== History ==
In 2006, inspired by the open collaboration movement, designer and technologist Ade Olufeko founded Visual Collaborative to bridge the gap between creative professionals and their commercial value. Since originating in Minneapolis, Visual Collaborative has showcased collections and talks in Minneapolis, Miami, New York City, The Mission San Francisco California, Columbia Maryland, and Washington D.C.

In 2007, the group's inaugural event featured international artists Miko Simmons and Linda Zacks, which took place at the original Center for Independent Artists, inside Instituto de Cultura y Educacion located in a community of South Minneapolis. In 2011, in Washington D.C., Visual Collaborative produced an exhibition featuring emerging and established artists with a collection described as vibrant new art. In 2015, the platform collaborated with the Arts District Hyattsville Master Association in Hyattsville, utilizing the Lustine Center to host a group exhibition themed Vanity.

== Operating model ==
Up until 2015, the platform's exhibitions occurred as disruptive innovation in a traveling formatted pattern. They have been held in reputable galleries, lofts or donated spaces by private owners who include art enthusiasts and lifelong patrons of the arts. They are executed through joint ventures with other arts and humanities organisations which have in the past included Arts District Hyattsville Master Association in Prince George's County and Voices for Children Miami. In April 2019, Visual Collaborative launched an open access online collective called Polaris, also documented as North Star by the Library of Congress, ISSN 2642-9780.

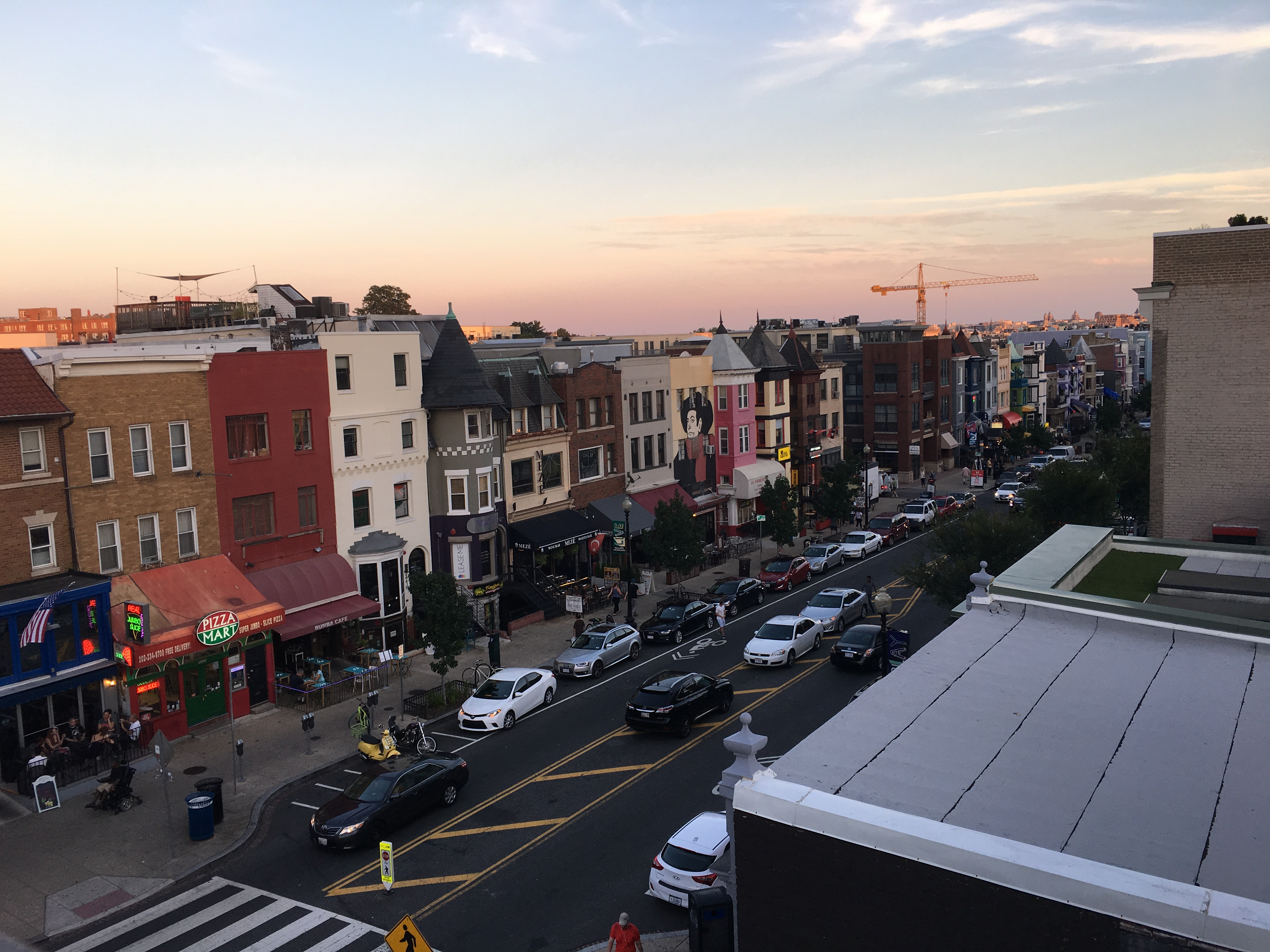
A month-long pop-up exhibition featuring emerging artists and creatives took place in Adams Morgan, Northwest of Washington, D.C., 2011

== Exhibitions ==
Events held in U.S. cities before publishing expansion:

- 2007, Minneapolis, Minnesota, Center for Independent Artists
- 2008, Design District, Miami, Florida, Undercurrent Arts Miami Gallery
- 2011, Queens Gambit, Forest Hills and Fresh Meadows, Queens, NY
- 2011, Black, White + Monochrome & Color, San Francisco, California, Wonderland SF Gallery
- 2011, Visual Grandeur, Adams Morgan, Washington, D.C.
- 2012, 14th Street, Washington, D.C.
- 2013 VII, ENCORE Columbia, Maryland, pop-up store
- 2014, Cambridge, Massachusetts, Harvard University
- 2015, Vanity, Gateway Arts District, Hyattsville, Maryland, The Historic Lustin Center

== Publishing ==
In April 2019, Visual Collaborative launched an open access online collective called Polaris. The project commenced in the winter of 2019 for a period of three months. The interdisciplinary collective featured 26 practitioners from various disciplines. The Polaris catalogue explores creative disciplines, perspectives and intrinsic value of the featured practitioners and how they interact with society.

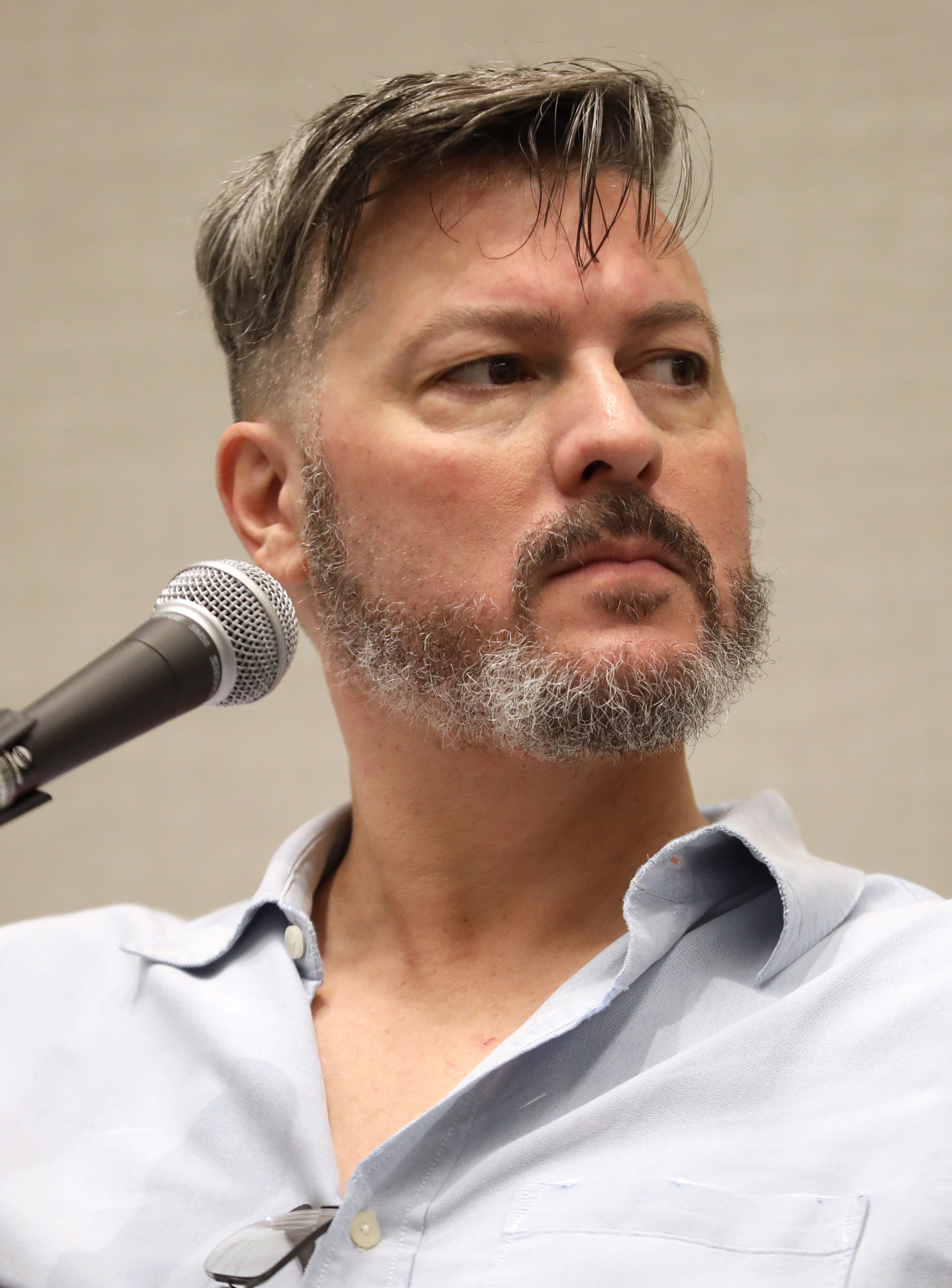
David Hayter, screenwriter of the X-Men films and voice actor, participated in the collective's seventh publication

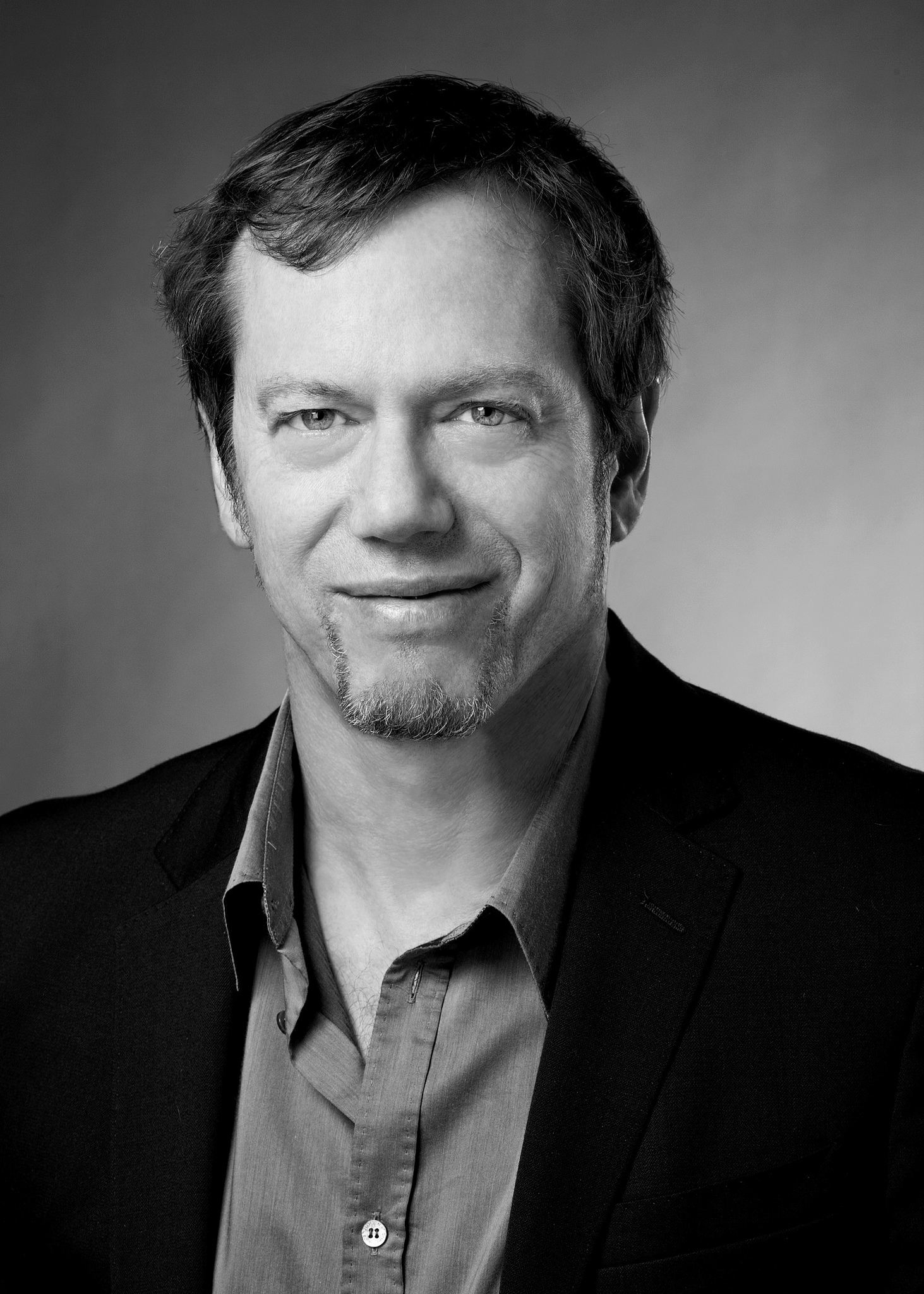
Robert Greene, author of The 48 Laws of Power, was featured in the collective's video interviews

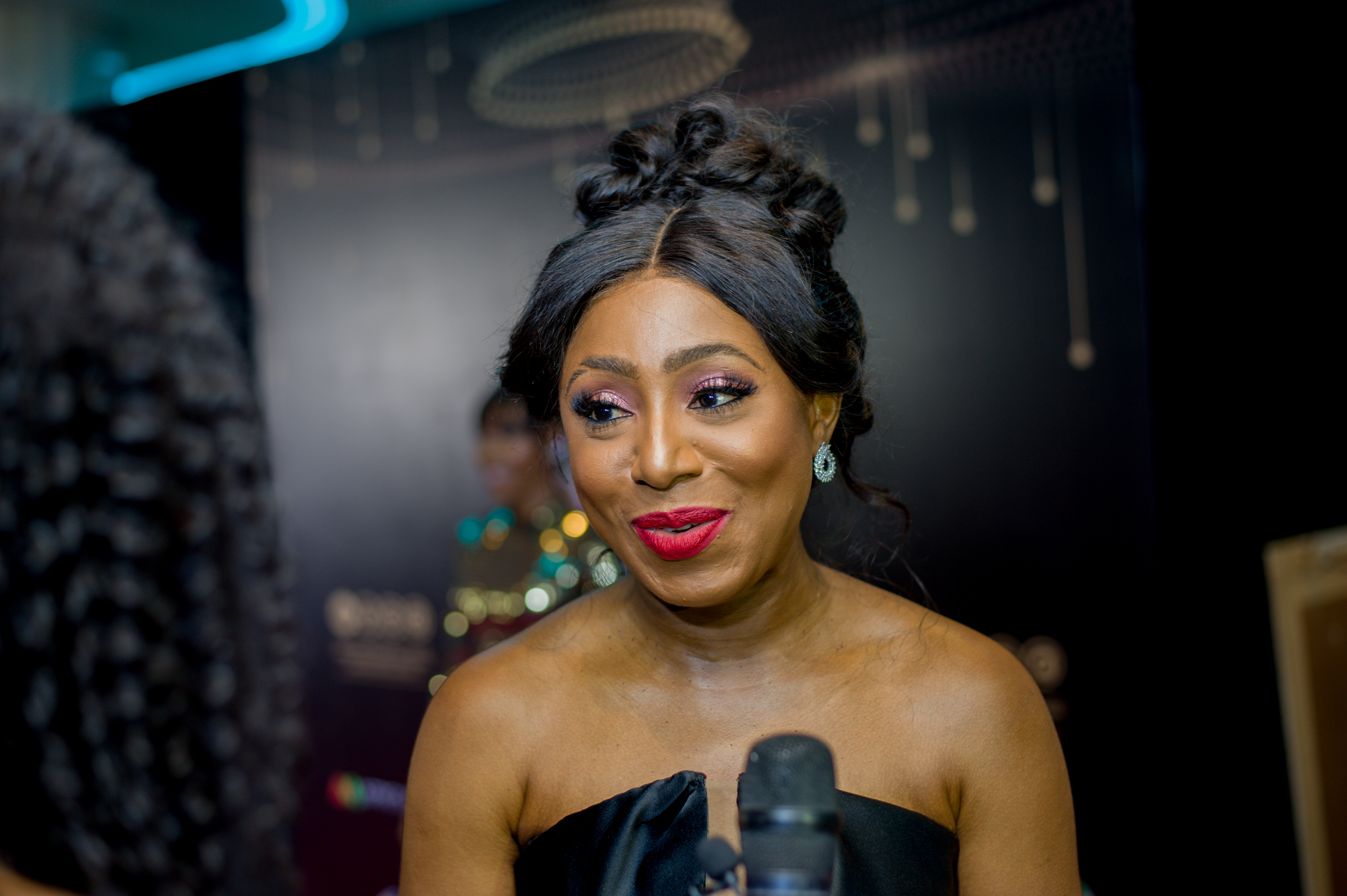
Nollywood actress Dakore Akande, whose conversation was reprised in TwentyEightyFour, the collective's fifth publication

Polaris features both established or emerging people in the creative industry, intersecting with anthropology and humanities. Its subtopics may include health and wellness, architecture, fashion, entertainment news and non-partisan political themes. In addition to covering professionals from regions around the globe, the content aims to boost literacy in various socioeconomic circles.

In June 2019, the second volume of the Polaris series featuring 25 people was released under the title Voyager. Seun Kuti was one of the main features.

=== 2020 TwentyEightyFour ===
In May 2020, international news outlets announced the release of the TwentyEightyFour series. The 5th volume of the Polaris catalog consisted of conducted and transcribed interviews, among the 21 participants featured French music sisters Les Nubians, Metal Gear music and soundtrack composer Rika Muranaka, Global strategist Busie Matsiko-Andan, Comedian Chigul, Electronic music artist Coppé and a reprised conversation of Nollywood actress Dakore Akande. Themes of adaptability and empathy ran consistently across the collective, aiming as a reprieve and alternative to the COVID-19 pandemic media barrage.

== interviews ==
Selected features from over 150 guests from the Polaris catalogue Volumes 1–10.

- David Hayter
- Robert Greene
- Bahia Shehab
- Seun Kuti
- Cheri Beasley
- Jens Gad
- Dakore Akande
- Les Nubians
- Marcie Rendon
- Tony Momrelle
- Tosin Oshinowo
- David Carson
- Polly Alakija
- Remi Vaughan-Richards
- Tiphanie Brooke
- Aya Chebbi
- Dawn Okoro
- Berla Mundi
- Rika Muranaka
- Swaady Martin
- Kelli Ali
- Adelaide Damoah
- Nse Ikpe-Etim
- Desdamona
- Marcia Ashong
- Eugene Ankomah
- Bisila Bokoko
- William Coupon
- Ade Adekola
- Chigul
- Coppé
- Gülnara Khalilova
- Sarasara
- Sahib Pashazadeh
- Theda Sandiford
- Yumiko Kayukawa
- Lynn Vartan
