= Ill Chemistry =

American hip hop group

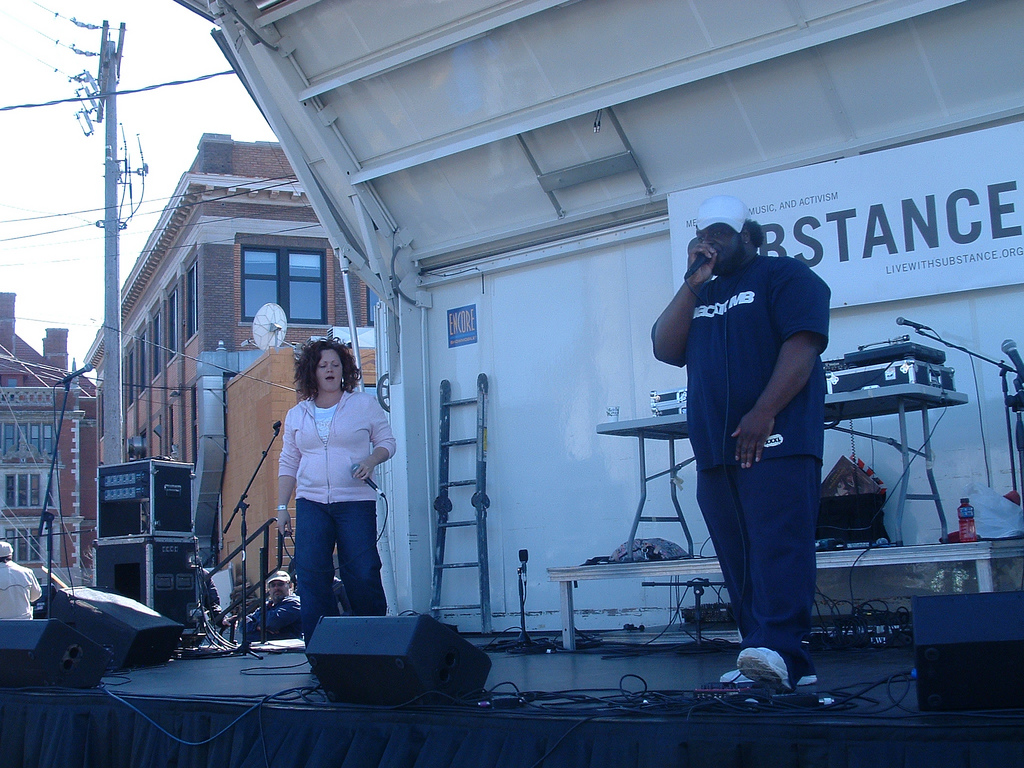
- Desdamona and Carnage the Executioner performing live.

Background information
- Origin: Minneapolis, Minnesota, United States
- Genres: Spoken word, hip hop
- Years active: 1998-present
- Labels: Hecatomb Records, Nato
- Members: Desdamona; Carnage the Executioner

Ill Chemistry is a spoken word/beatboxing/hip hop group based in Minneapolis, Minnesota, United States. The group consists of Carnage the Executioner and Desdamona.

== History ==
Ill Chemistry's members, Desdamona and Carnage the Executioner met in 1998 at a cafe in Minneapolis's Dinkytown neighborhood, where they exchanged lyrics. Carnage was recognized for his beatboxing abilities and Desdamona was gaining fame in the Minneapolis music scene. Each were performing separately, but sometime after they met, Carnage began to beatbox for Desdamona, taking the place of a DJ. They began to perform as a group after that.

As they bonded as a musical act, the group lacked a name which Carnage said was, "because it was really organic. Literally, not practiced." One fan commented that the group had "Ill Chemistry", and when the duo heard the phrase come from the mouths of multiple fans across the city, they chose it as their name. Carnage also noted that the name was powerful because of the chemistry he and Desdamona share as a musical group.

In October, 2007, the group was hired to do filler acts at Minneapolis's Black Dog Cafe's Black Dog Block Party. However, a thunderstorm nearly halted the event, so to keep people from leaving, the group got onstage and started performing with the thunder as an additional beat. Choreographer Andrew Rist, a co-founder of Ballet Minnesota, went home and choreographed dances to several of the duo's songs as part of his Black Dog Cafe ballet project. Instead of playing the tracks from a CD, Ill Chemistry performed live onstage next to the dancers.

In 2006, the group was nominated for "Best Hip Hop Artist/Group" in the Minnesota Music Awards.

in December 2011, they make their first French appearance at Les Allumés du Jazz in Le Mans and in Campus-Terrain d'Entente in Paris. Then in February 2012, they play their first official show at Sons d'Hiver opening for David Krakauer two months before their first French tour in April.

In this first French tour they are performing twice in Paris and then in Strasbourg, Nancy, Nantes, Dijon, and above all in Bourges for the famous Printemps de Bourges.

Ill Chemistry's previously unreleased track, "Hold On", was one of 31 songs released in the For New Orleans two-disc compilation. The CD, released on 2007 Apr 24, was sold to benefit the New Orleans Musicians' Village project. Desdamona and Carnage have also released CDs individually, some of which include guest appearances by the other. In 2012, Ill Chemistry's self-titled first album was released on Nato in France.

== Discography ==
- Ill Chemistry (2012)
