= Polly Alakija =

British muralist, artist and children's book author

Polly Alakija (born 1966) is a British muralist, artist and children's book author. Born in Britain, she moved to Nigeria upon marrying her Nigerian husband and most of her works focus on Nigerian-themed concepts.

She was an artist in residence for the 2015 Cheltenham Jazz Festival and had a solo exhibition at the Quintessence Gallery, Ikoyi also in 2015. A number of her works are composed of paintings of objects such as Cycle rickshaws called marwa in Nigeria, molue bus and Volkswagen Beetles. In 2019, Alakija was featured in the Visual Collaborative electronic catalog, under the Polaris series, she was interviewed alongside other artists from around the world.

== Life ==
Alakija was born in Malvern, Worcestershire in 1966, she studied at Oxford Polytechnic. In 1989, she moved to Nigeria with her husband, Ade Alakija. The family was based in Ibadan, Oyo State.

In October, 2013, she had her first major public exhibition titled Here and There. Some of her displayed works included canvas works inspired by dance, painted objects used by Nigerians such as canoes and portraits with a common theme of mother and child images that are inspired by her sojourn in urban and rural Nigeria.

Alakija was a painter and artist in Uche Nwokedi's produced period musical play, Kakadu; she was involved in painting scenes in the play and sketches of actors on stage during rehearsals. Alakija has written a few children's books including Catch that Goat, Counting Chickens, and A Stork in a Baobab Tree.
