= Psychic Cat =

Studio album by Kelli Ali
- Released: 26 October 2004
- Genre: Pop rock; electroclash
- Length: 37:41
- Label: One Little Indian
- Producer: Dave McCracken; Kelli Ali

Kelli Ali chronology
Tigermouth (2003)	Psychic Cat (2004)	Rocking Horse (2008)

Singles from Psychic Cat
- 1. "Speakers" / "Voyeur" Released: May 2004; 2. "Hot Lips" Released: 2004

Professional ratings
Review scores
Source	Rating
AllMusic	3.5/5 stars
PopMatters	2/10
Slant	2.5/5 stars

Psychic Cat is the second solo album by Kelli Ali, released in 2004 on One Little Indian. The album was a departure from Ali's previous album, Tigermouth, as she experimented with electronic dance beats and repetitive lyrics, creating more of an industrial/electronica sounding album. The first single from the album was a double A-side, "Speakers"/"Voyeur", and the official radio single from this album was "Hot Lips".

== Track listing ==
All lyrics are written by Kelli Ali.

No.	Title	Music	Producer	Length
1.	"Hot Lips"	Ali; Dave McCracken	Ali	2:56
2.	"Psychic Cat"	Ali; Xavier Alsina; Chris Coffey; McCracken	McCracken	4:27
3.	"Speakers"	Ali; McCracken	McCracken	3:40
4.	"Home Honey I'm High"	Ali; McCracken; Tony O'Neil	McCracken	3:47
5.	"Ideal"	Ali; McCracken; Andrew Innes	Ali	5:03
6.	"In Praise of Shadows"	Ali; McCracken	McCracken	3:21
7.	"Graffiti Boy"	Ali; O'Neil	Ali	4:10
8.	"Groupie"	Ali; McCracken; Metso	McCracken	4:24
9.	"Voyeur"	Ali; McCracken; Metso	McCracken	3:14
10.	"Last Boy on Earth"	Ali; McCracken	Ali	2:39
Total length:				37:41

== Personnel ==
- Kelli Ali – vocals, lyrics, additional keyboards (1, 7), production
- Ben Parker – guitars (1, 3, 7, 9, 10)
- Cezhan Ambrose – guitars (1)
- Xavier Alsina – guitars (2, 3, 5)
- Andrew Innes – guitars (5), additional keyboards (5)
- Dave McCracken – keyboards, programming, production
- Steve Fitz-Maurice – mixing
- Bunt Stafford Clark – mastering
