= Tigermouth =

Studio album by Kelli Ali
- Released: 4 March 2003
- Recorded: 2001–2002
- Genre: Dance-pop; electropop; R&B; pop rock
- Length: 57:27
- Label: One Little Indian Records
- Producer: Kelli Ali; Marius De Vries; Rick Nowels; Wayne Rodrigues

Kelli Ali chronology
Tigermouth (2003)	Psychic Cat (2004)

Professional ratings
Review scores
Source	Rating
AllMusic	link

Tigermouth is the debut studio album by singer-songwriter Kelli Ali released in 2003.

Previously, Ali was the lead vocalist for Sneaker Pimps, a trip-hop group, who are best known for their 1996 album Becoming X which featured Ali on vocals.

Ali co-produced and co-wrote the album with producers, Rick Nowels and Marius de Vries.

Singles released off the album include, "Kids", "Inferno High Love", and "Teardrop Hittin' the Ground".

== Overview ==
Tigermouth was recorded primarily in Los Angeles at the home studios of hit-making producer Rick Nowels. Nowels' knack with radio-friendly hooks and the sunny climate of L.A. clearly informed Tigermouth, which is a bright, lush, and unabashedly pop-oriented record. Tigermouth stands in stark contrast to the moody, atmospheric sounds associated with Ali's Sneaker Pimps recordings.

However, because of this new sound and her high-profile collaborators, some in the British press dismissed the album as a blatant grab for "mainstream" success. Ali herself responded to this criticism a year later on her website:

Nothing could have been further from my mind... For the sake of ease and sales, it is easier for the media to "understand" what it is they're selling but rest assured, I make music with all my heart and soul without any commercial interest what so ever [sic] and I am glad that I made Tigermouth when and how and with whom I made it. The doubters may kiss my sorry ass.

Tigermouth was not a commercial success upon its release, despite its radio-friendly disposition.

== Track listing ==
All songs written by Kelli Ali and Rick Nowels except where noted:

No.	Title	Writer(s)	Length
1.	"Inferno High Love"		3:44
2.	"Teardrop Hittin' the Ground"		3:15
3.	"Keep on Dreaming"		3:42
4.	"Angel in L.A."		4:59
5.	"Here Comes the Summer"		3:36
6.	"Fellow Man"	Ali, Nowels, Wayne Rodrigues	5:22
7.	"Sunlight in the Rain"	Ali, Marius de Vries	4:37
8.	"Beautiful Boy"	Ali, Vries	5:19
9.	"Queen of the World"		4:09
10.	"Wings in Motion"		2:50
11.	"The Infinite Stars"		4:36
12.	"Kids" ("Tigermouth" (4:45) starts at 6:34)		11:18
Total length:			57:27

== Personnel ==
- Kelli Ali - Vocals, Background Vocals
- Rusty Anderson - Guitar (Electric), Effects
- Curt Bisquera - Percussion
- Andy Bradfield - Engineer
- Greg Collins - Engineer
- David Dale - Mixing
- John Densmore – Hand Percussion
- Matt Fields – Assistant Engineer
- Chris Garcia – Bass, Guitar, engineer
- Ashley Howe – Mixing
- Manny Marroquin – Mixing
- Kieron Menzies – Engineer
- Rick Nowels – Guitar (Acoustic), Guitar (Electric), Keyboards, Mellotron, Chamberlain, Wurlitzer
- John Pierce – Bass
- Tim Pierce – Guitar (Electric)
- Wayne Rodrigues – Keyboards, Drum Programming
- Mark "Spike" Stent – Mixing
- Alan Veucasovic – Engineer
- Wayne Wilkins – Engineer, Digital Editing
- Randy Wine – Engineer

== Production ==
- Art Direction: Think 1
- Digital Manipulation: Absynthe Photographic
- Photography: Sandrine Dulermo
- Project Coordinator: Colleen Reynolds, Kristin Johnson

== Tigermouth-era B-Sides ==
- "Lipgloss" (Kelli Ali, Rick Nowels) – 3:24
- "Lucifer Rising" (Kelli Ali, Rick Nowels) – 4:59
- "Paper Moon" (Kelli Ali, Rick Nowels) – 4:05

== Tigermouth Official Track Remixes ==
- "Kids" (Mark 'Spike' Stent Radio Edit/Radio Edit) – 3:54
- "Kids" (Rawkish Mix) – 7:21
- "Kids" (Armand Van Helden Rockish Mix Radio Edit) – ?:??
- "Kids" (Rui Da Silva Vocal Mix) – 8:15
- "Kids" (Jagz Kooner Vocal Mix) – ?:??
- "Kids" (Jagz Kooner Dub) – ?:??
- "Inferno High Love" (Riva Radio Edit) – 3:28
- "Inferno High Love" (Riva Vocal Mix) – ?:??
- "Inferno High Love" (Sharpboys Atomic Dub) – ?:??
- "Inferno High Love" (Sharpboys Atomic Vocal Mix) – 7:38
- "Teardop Hittin' The Ground" (Nellee Hooper Mix) – 3:50

== Tigermouth Promotional Version Info ==
The promotional version of Tigermouth was released on 24 June 2002 with "Paper Moon" as track number nine, in between "The Infinite Stars" and "Kids". "Moon" was later released in 2003 as a B-side to the "Teardrop Hittin' The Ground" single. The "Tigermouth" promotional version listed "Teardrop Hittin' The Ground" under its original title, "Teardrop", and did not contain the following tracks, which are featured on the final release: "Keep on Dreaming", "Beautiful Boy" and "Wings in Motion". It also included an alternate version of "The Infinite Stars" with quieter electric guitars.
