= Zaïr Kédadouche =

French footballer and diplomat (born 1957)

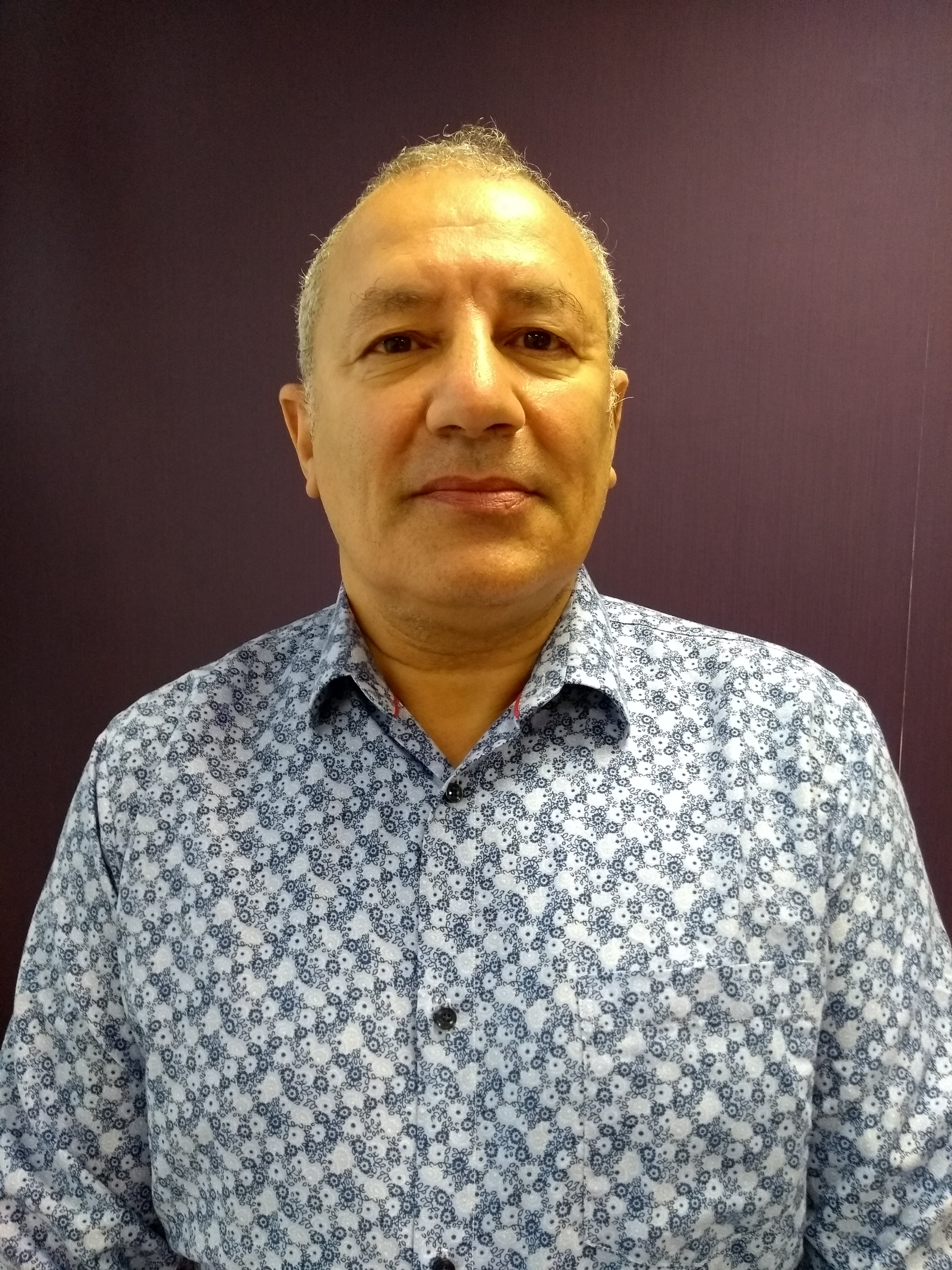
- Kédadouche in 2022

Personal information
- Full name: Zaïr Kédadouche
- Date of birth: 9 August 1957 (age 69)
- Place of birth: Tourcoing, France
- Positions: Defender; midfielder

Senior career*
Years	Team	Apps	(Gls)
1975–1977	CS Sedan		
1977–1983	Paris FC		
1984–1988	Red Star 93		
- * Club domestic league appearances and goals

Zaïr Kédadouche (born 9 August 1957) is a French former professional footballer who played as a defender or a midfielder. He is also a published author with his 1996 book Zair le gaulois, and is the founder of the Cité nationale de l'histoire de l'immigration museum.

From 2008 to 2014, he became a French diplomat (Consul General in Liège, then ambassador in Andorra).

== Honours ==
Orders

- Knight of the National Order of Merit: 1994
- Knight of the Legion of Honour: 2002
