= Carnage the Executioner =

American rapper

Carnage The Executioner
- Also known as: Terrell X, Terrell X'avion
- Born: Maynard Terrell Woods; 1974 (age 51–52)
- Origin: Twin Cities, Minnesota
- Genres: Alternative hip hop
- Occupations: producer, Rapper, Beatboxer, Activist
- Years active: 1996–present
- Labels: Hecatomb Industries, Fill in the Breaks
- Website: carnagetheexecutioner.com

Terrell X'Avion (born Maynard Terell Woods, 1974), better known by his stage name Carnage The Executioner, is an American rapper from Twin Cities, Minnesota. He is best known for rapping, human beatboxing, performing live, and teaching. Outside of his solo work, he is also part of the groups Ill Chemistry and Saltee.

Based in Minneapolis, Carnage's musical journey has taken him on 15 U.S. tours, 5 European tours, 2 Mexico Tours, and 1 Asian tour. Carnage gained national fame from his guest appearances with Eyedea & Abilities, however, his original songs are said to be what allowed fans to connect with him. Some of his original songs are Addict, Save My People, and The MTW Story.

== Career ==
As a music fan since early childhood, Carnage The Executioner began as a self-trained artist. His experience in the music industry includes rapping, producing, performing, and teaching beatbox lessons, but is not limited to these things.

In 1998 Carnage The Executioner beatboxed for Desdamona, and the two created the group Ill Chemistry. Shortly after in 2004, Carnage The Executioner started his own independent record label, Hecatomb Enterprise. After creating Hecatomb he used it to present his first release, The Carnology Vol. 0.5 EP.

In 2007 Carnage The Executioner released Sense of Sound, a collaborative album with producer Booka B, and changed the label's name to Hecatomb Industries. His first solo album, Worth the Wait, was released in 2011. The following year he released Respect the Name. Respect the Name was overseen and largely produced by Carnage himself in 2012 to share with fans his life story. That year Carnage was also chosen by City Pages as one of the "Top 20 best Minnesota rappers".

With skills in human beatboxing and over thirty years of experience, Carnage instructs others to "use the body as an instrument". However, with the increase in technology over recent years, he now also applies looping and effects pedals, commonly used by guitarists for added effect. His beatboxing skills can also be heard on albums by Hip-hop artists Aesop Rock and R.A. the Rugged Man.

== Personal life ==
After years of struggling to maintain a healthy body weight, Carnage began eating a plant-based diet in 2017. Inspired by his new diet, Carnage started a grassroots movement called Plant Based Poets. Plant Based Poets began in 2019 and is used to connect music lovers who support healthy, earth-friendly lifestyles.

Carnage talks about his struggles with over-consumption in his 2019 album Ravenous. The album takes on Carnage's perspectives of 'embracing negativity, over-eating, and attracting'. He lost 125 pounds after starting his diet.

== Hecatomb ==
Carnage started his own independent record label in 2004. Originally the label was named Hecatomb Enterprises but was changed to Hecatomb Industries in 2001 with the release of his album Sense Of Sound.

In 2004 Hecatomb Crew was created as a branch of Hecatomb Industries. Carnage The Executioner started Hecatomb Crew to recruit a multinational team of like-minded Hip-Hop artists to collaborate new works.

== Discography ==
=== Albums ===
- Sense of Sound (2007) (with Booka B)
- Worth the Wait (2011)
- ill chemistry (2012) (with Desdamona, as Ill Chemistry)
- Crosspolynation (2012) (Saltee feat. Carnage The Executioner)
- Carnage The Executioner's Carnology Volume II:Sinner Takes All (digi-mix) (2014)
- The Ultimatum (2015)
- The MN Mean Movement (2016)
- Attack of the Show Stealer (2018) (Live Performance Album)
- Ravenous (2019)
- AntiFaux 1.0 (2021) (with Johnny Pain)
- Transformation to Terrell X (2024)

=== Singles ===
- The Show Saver (2017) (Digital Super Single)

=== Collaborations ===
- ill chemistry (2012) (Carnage The Executioner and Desdamona)
- Crosspolynation (2012) (Saltee feat. Carnage The Executioner)
- Tout va monter (2015) (Joëlle Léandre|Benoît Delbecq|Carnage The Executioner)
- AntiFaux 1.0 (2021) (with Johnny Pain)
