= Hokkaido College of Art & Design =

Art school in Sapporo, Japan

Coordinates: 43.0897°N 141.3382°E

Hokkaido College of Art & Design (美専学園 北海道芸術デザイン専門学校, Bisen Gakuen Hokkaidō Geijutsu Dezain Senmon Gakkō), or Bisen for short (ビセン), is an art school located in Kita-ku, Sapporo, Hokkaido, Japan, which was established in 1961.

== History ==
- 1961 - Shirayuki Institute of Arts (Shirayuki Bijyutsu Kenkyusho in Japanese) was established in Nishi-ku, Sapporo. Shirayuki stands for White Snow.
- 1966 - Shirayuki Institute of Arts moved to Kita-ku, Sapporo and it was renamed Hokkaido Art School (Hokkaido Bijyutsu Gakko in Japanese).
- 1976 - Hokkaido Art School was renamed Hokkaido College of Comprehensive Arts (Hokkaido Sogo Bijyutsu Senmon Gakko in Japanese).
- 1983 - The International Exchange Program started with the Emily Carr University of Art and Design in Canada. Douglas Coupland came as the first exchange student.
- 1991 - The International Exchange Program started with Plymouth University in England.
- 1992 - Douglas Coupland, the first student of the international exchange programs, published a book "Generation X." This book became very popular, selling 100,000 copies in United States. Also, Isao Yamada, who belongs to the fifth consecutive graduating year, was praised for his film "I've Heard the Ammonite Murmur" among independent films at the Cannes Film Festival.
- 1994 - Hokkaido College of Comprehensive Arts took part in an event of the International Association of Independent Art and Design Schools (AIAS), which was held in Paris, and became a member.
- 1996 - Hokkaido College of Comprehensive Arts was renamed Hokkaido College of Art and Design. Also, the International Exchange Program started with Capilano University in Canada.

== Faculties ==
- Specialist Courses (Daytime)
  - Department of Industrial Design
    - Graphic Design Course
    - Illustration Course
  - Department of Multimedia Design
    - CG・Web Design Course
    - Animation・Game Creator Course
  - Department of Environmental Design
    - Interior Design Course
    - Interior Coordination Course
    - Craft Design Course
    - Flower Design Course
  - Department of Architectural Design
    - The Second-Class Registered Architect Course
    - House and Shop Design Course
- General Courses (Nighttime)
  - Department of Comprehensive Design and Modeling
    - Fine Art Course
    - Graphic Design Course
    - Illustration Course
    - CG・Web Design Course
    - Comprehensive Interior Design Course

== Sister schools ==
- Capilano University
- Emily Carr University of Art and Design
- Plymouth University
- Hokkaido College of Radiology & Pharmacy

== Notable alumni and alumna ==
Manga artist

- Akiko Monden
- Masaaki Nakayama
- Yuji Iwahara
- Karuho Shiina
- Masasumi Kakizaki
- Yuki Ota

Illustrator

- Masami Nishimura
- Yoshikatsu Kuriyama
- Suzuki Yasushi
- Kurando Ikeda
- Umiu-Geso
- Shiori Matsuura

Art director

- Eiji Sakagawa
- Kenji Yamamoto
- Ryohei Kudo (Wabi-Sabi)
- Naoki Fujita
- Junya Kamata

Film director

- Isao Yamada

Picture book author

- Mari Kasai

Fine artist

- Toshiya Kobayashi
- Kenji Nagahama
- Yumiko Kayukawa

Novelist and artist

- Douglas Coupland (an exchange student from Emily Carr University of Art and Design in 1983)
