= Adelaide Damoah =

British artist (born 1976)

Adelaide Damoah RWA FRSA
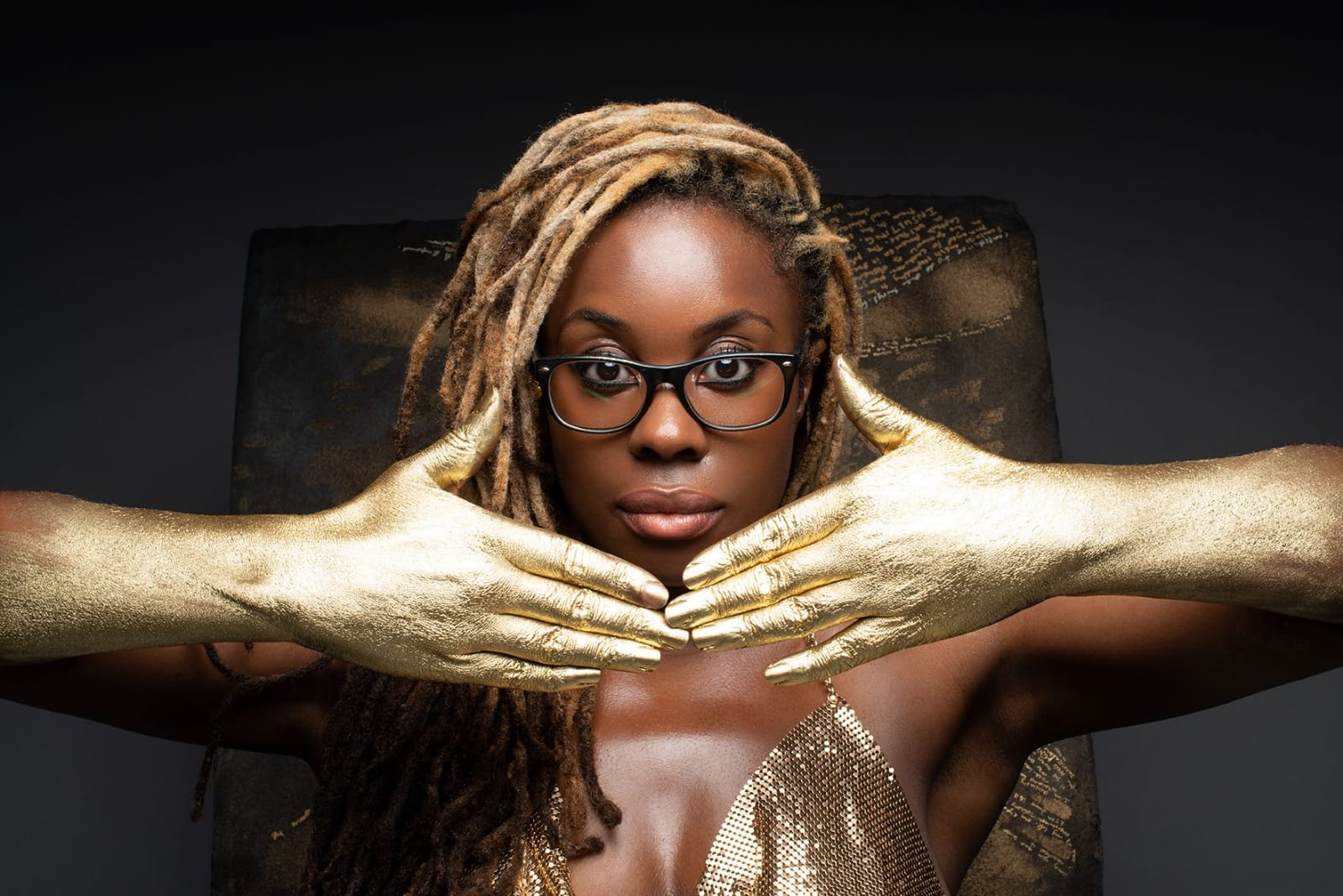
- Portrait of Adelaide Damoah for Genesis exhibition taken by Femelle Studios 2018
- Born: 16 November 1976 (age 49)
- Education: Kingston University (BSc (Hons) Applied Biology) (1999)
- Occupation: Artist
- Known for: Painting; performance art

Adelaide Damoah RWA FRSA (born 16 November 1976) is a British painter and performance artist of Ghanaian descent who uses her body as the starting point for much of her work. Themes of particular interest include feminism, colonialism, religion and spirituality.

Damoah's debut exhibition entitled "Black Brits," took place in 2006 in Charlie Allen's Boutique, Islington, London, UK and received some media attention. It was featured on BBC News, Channel 5 News and other regional and local media outlets in the UK.

Damoah's solo exhibitions to date also include Genesis, This is Us, Supermodels, Black Lipstick, and a domestic violence exhibition for the National Centre for Domestic Violence. Performances to date include This is Me the Inconsistency of the Self, My Body is Present, Homage to Ana Mendieta and #MYFACE.

== Education ==
Damoah studied Applied Biology at Kingston University in South West London, England graduating with honours in 1999.

== Career ==
Damoah worked in the pharmaceutical industry as a medical representative for six years. During that time, Damoah was diagnosed with endometriosis. As a result of the condition she left the industry. She then pursued oil painting.

Damoah's debut exhibition Black Brits was launched in 2006. The exhibition sought to examine the role of race and identity in iconography. The series, through a series of portraits, sought to question whether the race of major British icons as diverse as the Krays and David Beckham was relevant to their given status as icons. They were portrayed with reversed skin colours.

On 6 March 2006, Damoah arranged a demonstration at Parliament Square as part of Endometriosis awareness week with the Endometriosis charity Endometriosis UK. The event was marked by a communal scream by participants followed by a march to 10 Downing Street to hand in a 13,000 signature petition for the Prime Minister Tony Blair.

Her second exhibition was “Supermodels" exhibited at Nolia's Gallery, London in 2008. The series of large oil paintings examined the size zero discussion, which became a popular social debate in 2006. Subsequent exhibitions include "Black Lipstick" in 2008 and "NCDV" in 2009. Damoah was invited to Hungary in 2009 to take part in an exhibition entitled "British Art in the Twenty First Century" at Opera Gallery in Budapest. In November 2015, she put on her fifth solo exhibition in Camden, London entitled "This is Us."

In October 2018, she launched her sixth solo show entitled Genesis in London. The exhibition, which comprised paintings, prints and performative works, was accompanied by a dynamic events programme, including a live streamed performance by Adelaide Damoah, democratising the way in which the work is consumed, but also interrogating the complexities of internet culture and how we connect through performance. Though the work itself is complex and multi-faceted, it was built around a minimal palette of black and gold. Speaking of this decision, the artist explained that "black and gold have been used both for aesthetic and metaphorical reasons. Black is evoking skin colour, but also absence as a lived experience. Meanwhile, gold is referring to Ghana's historical source of wealth which gave it its colonial name (Gold Coast)."

Group shows in 2018 included Bonhams "We face Forward!" A celebration of contemporary Ghanaian artists including El Anatsui and Professor Ablade Glover and Muse, Model or Mistress in London.

Her current work involves using her own body as "a paintbrush of sorts," by covering herself with oil paint and pressing her body onto her painting surface, leaving impressions, or traces of herself behind. Only too aware of the historic hyper-sexualisation of the black female body, Damoah is resolute that this is far from what she wishes to explore in the work. Gender and race are obvious issues which are apparent, however, Damoah maintains that the work is about much more than this. Writing on her painting surfaces using text in English, Twi and Ga, (the latter two being the languages of the artists parents) Damoah expresses a deep desire to connect with her Ghanaian roots, while entering into a conversation about where she fits in as a child of the African Diaspora. The influence of artist Artist Ana Mendieta is apparent in this new work, while direct references in her written text to artist Jean Michele Basquiat, reflect a self-confessed admiration for the artist. Damoah cites Frida Kahlo as her main artistic influence. To date, Damoah has examined social issues in her work including issues regarding race, identity, sexuality, and domestic violence.

In 2020, inspired by the events of the same year, Damoah produced the series of body prints entitled Radical Joy. This work was then exhibited in a solo exhibition of the same name at Sakhile & Me Gallery in Frankfurt, Germany. This series of work was divided into chapters, including Heavenly bodies, Mysteries of Desire, The embodiment of Play and Moonlit Power. The Mysteries of Desire chapter of this series is what gave rise to her body of work, Mysteries of Desire, which she then went on to exhibit in Paris the following year. This body of work marked a significant change in Damoah's way of thinking about colour and subject matter.

Selected group exhibitions in 2023 include the ground breaking "Rites of Passage" at Gagosian gallery in London, curated by Peju Oshin. Damoah performed "Arachne: Rebirthing Dislocated Cultures", inside the same exhibition to close it. In October 2023, Two of Damoah's Mysteries of Desire artworks, which were debut during her first institutional solo exhibition at Fondation H museum, Paris in 2022, were displayed in the exhibition, "Accra! The Rise of a Global Art Community", at the Columbus museum of Art in Ohio.

Damoah is a founding member of the BBFA Collective and was a co-founder of the INFEMS Collective. In September 2019, Damoah appeared in the Visual Collaborative electronic catalogue, in an issue themed Vivencias which translates to "Experiences" in Spanish. She was interviewed alongside 30 people from around the world that included Kelli Ali, Dakore Akande and Desdamona. She was a guest artist of Museum Week in Paris at the Cite nationale de l'histoire de l'immigration.
