= Kelli Ali =

English singer (born 1974)

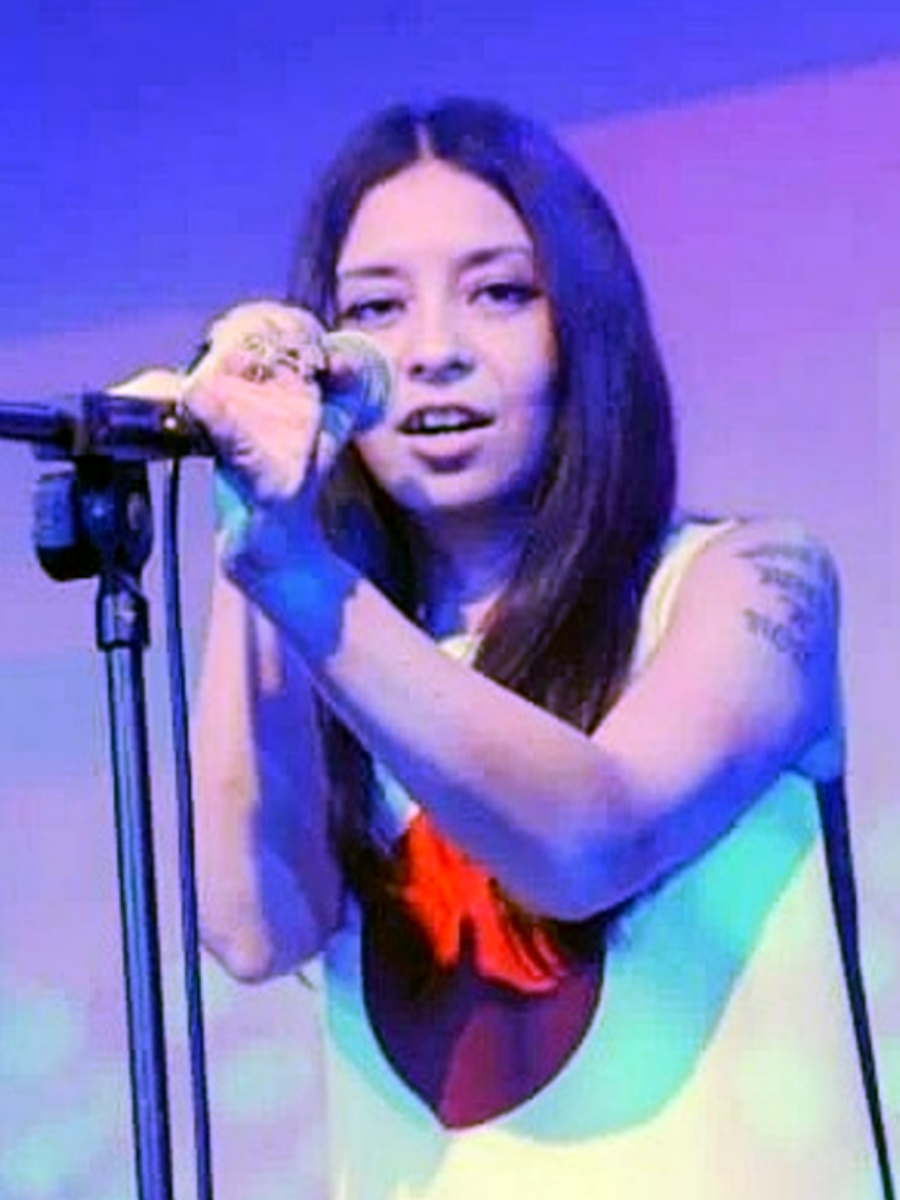
- Kelli Ali in 2013

Background information
- Born: Kelli Dayton; 30 June 1974 (age 52); Birmingham, England
- Genres: Alternative rock; electronic; dream pop; trip hop; folk; industrial
- Instruments: Vocals, guitar
- Years active: 1990–present
- Label: One Little Independent Records
- Formerly of: The Lumieres; Sneaker Pimps; Dropz
- Website: Kelliali.com

Kelli Dayton, known professionally as Kelli Ali (born 30 June 1974), is a British musician, guitarist, and artist. She was formerly the lead singer of the trip hop group Sneaker Pimps before going on to a solo career.

== Career ==
=== Early bands (1990–1996) ===
Before Sneaker Pimps, Ali was part of a group called Psycho Drama, which she joined when she was 16 years old. A few years later, she was asked by Russell Cross of the band The Lumieres to join his band (as their songwriter, singer, and lead guitarist). The Lumieres only had one major single, "Cinder Hearts".

=== Sneaker Pimps and Becoming X (1996–1997) ===
With Sneaker Pimps she was featured prominently in both the songs and the music videos for the album Becoming X (the group finding fame following the release of the hit single "6 Underground"). Ali was released from the group in 1998 when Chris Corner, the principal songwriter, decided to do vocals for his own songs.

=== Tigermouth, Psychic Cat and Rocking Horse (1998–2008) ===
After leaving Sneaker Pimps, she moved on to a solo career under the name Kelli Ali after her father who had died before the release of Becoming X. Her first solo album, Tigermouth, was released in 2003. It includes tracks "Sunlight in the Rain" and "Kids" and features ex-Doors drummer John Densmore. She toured alongside Garbage in April 2002 and released a follow-up album, Psychic Cat, in mid-2004. The second album was more of a return to Ali's rock and roll roots and featured musician-turned-author Tony O'Neill on keyboards.

In April 2006, she travelled to Japan to record and write tracks with Hoshino Hidehiko from Buck-Tick and Cube Juice for the band Dropz. The same year, producer Paul Oakenfold recorded the Kelli Ali penned song "Faster Kill Pussycat" with actress Brittany Murphy. It is Murphy's only single release.

On 24 November 2008, Ali released Rocking Horse, her third solo album. The album was produced by Max Richter (Fat Cat records) in Glasgow and Edinburgh in the first half of 2008. In 2009, she self-released the album Butterfly.

=== Band of Angels and Ghostdriver (2013–present) ===
Ali released her fifth album in 2013, entitled Band of Angels. She has collaborated with the UK band Cult With No Name.

On 2 December 2016, on her Instagram feed Kelli Ali announced a new project, Ghostdriver. In her announcement Ali stated "...it will be a joint album & film project. A noir thriller and love letter to London." The project was being crowd-funded via a PledgeMusic campaign. On 30 December 2017, Ali posted an update to the site, stating, "Thanks to you, all the filming for Ghostdriver was completed and the edit is in full swing, all songs written and in the later stages of production."

On 24 November 2018, Ali released "The Fear of London" as the lead single from Ghostdriver. It was distributed as a seven-track digital remix single exclusively to fans who contributed to her PledgeMusic campaign. This was followed by an exclusive PledgeMusic-only digital release of the full 15-track Ghostdriver album on 26 January 2019, with an announcement that a full commercial release of the album and single will follow later in 2019 in conjunction with the release of the final film. In the album release announcement, Ali also revealed that her former Sneaker Pimps bandmate and notable producer and engineer Liam Howe contributed extensively to the mix and additional production of the album, notably marking the first collaboration between two original Sneaker Pimps band members since their disbandment.

As post-production work on the film continued through 2019, Ali released a stand-alone single, "Sadistic". It is a collaboration with producer Satoshi Tomiie, recorded during the Ghostdriver sessions. It features additional mix and production from Liam Howe. Released in December 2019 was a limited edition, deluxe Lipstick USB set and a new music video. The Ghostdriver film's post-production suffered delays in 2020 due to the Coronavirus pandemic. The soundtrack album was released 26 November 2020, with the film expected around summer 2023 after various post-production delays. As of September 2024 the film has not been released.

In September 2019, Kelli Ali appeared as a main feature in the Visual Collaborative electronic catalogue, in an issue themed Vivencias which translates to "Experiences" in Spanish. She was interviewed alongside 30 people from around the world such as Dakore Akande, Adelaide Damoah and Desdamona.

In 2021, Ali's song "Rocking Horse" appeared on the soundtrack of the six-part Netflix thriller series Behind Her Eyes.

== Discography ==
=== Studio albums ===
List of studio albums, with selected details
Title	Details
Tigermouth	Released: 4 March 2003; Label: One Little Indian; Format: CD, digital download, streaming
Psychic Cat	Released: 24 May 2004; Label: One Little Indian; Format: CD, digital download, streaming
Rocking Horse	Released: 24 November 2008; Label: One Little Indian; Format: CD, digital download, streaming
Butterfly	Released: 1 April 2009; Label: Self-released; Format: CD, digital download, streaming
A Paradise Inhabited by Devils (with Ozymandias)	Released: 28 October 2010; Label: Self-released; Format: Digital download, streaming
Band of Angels	Released: 7 January 2013; Label: Self-released; Format: CD, digital download, streaming
Ghostdriver	Released: 25 January 2019; Label: Self-released; Format: CD, digital download, streaming

=== Singles ===
==== As lead artist ====
List of singles as lead artist, with selected chart positions
Title	Year	Peak chart positions		Album
Title	Year	UK Dance	UK Indie	Album
"Kids"	2001	10	36	Tigermouth
"Inferno High Love"	2002	—	—	Tigermouth
"Teardrop Hittin' the Ground"	2003	—	—	Tigermouth
"Speakers"	2004	—	—	Psychic Cat
"Hot Lips"	2004	—	—	Psychic Cat
"What to Do"	2008	—	—	Rocking Horse
"The Savages"	2009	—	—	Rocking Horse
"Kiss Me Cleopatra"	2013	—	—	Band of Angels
"The Art of Love"	2015	—	—	Band of Angels
"The Hunter"	2017	—	—	Band of Angels
"The Fear of London"	2018	—	—	Ghostdriver
"Sadistic"	2019	—	—	Ghostdriver
"—" denotes a recording that did not chart or was not released in that territory.

==== As featured artist ====
List of singles as a featured artist, with selected chart positions
Title	Year	Peak chart positions						Album
Title	Year	UK	UK Dance	UK Indie	GER	SWI	US Dance	Album
"Up in Flames" (Satoshi Tomiie featuring Kelli Ali)	1999	78	8	—	—	—	4	Full Lick
"Love in Traffic" (Satoshi Tomiie featuring Kelli Ali)	2001	79	—	8	—	—	4	Full Lick
"Play with Bootsy" (Bootsy Collins featuring Kelli Ali)	2002	—	—	—	57	73	—	Play with Bootsy
"—" denotes a recording that did not chart or was not released in that territory.

=== Guest appearances ===
List of guest appearances, with other performing artists
Title	Year	Other artist(s)	Album
"Almost Diamonds"	1999	Marc Almond	Open All Night
"Still"	1999	Double Six	Beyond Sci-Fi
"Voodoo"	2001	Stashrider	Non-album singles
"This Way"	2002	Marc van Linden, Madagascar	Non-album singles
"Cruel"	2002	Bryan Ferry, Alice Retif, Audrey Wheeler, Sarah Brown	Frantic
"Hiroshima…"	2002	Bryan Ferry, Alice Retif	Frantic
"San Simeon"	2002	Bryan Ferry, Alison Goldfrapp, Lucy Kaplansky, Patti Russo, Sarah Brown	Frantic
"My<Dsmbr"	2002	Linkin Park, Mickey P.	Reanimation
"Payback Time"	2003	The Dysfunctional Psychedelic Waltons	Non-album single
"Transient Man"	2003	Millenia Nova	Narcotic Wide Screen Vista
"Sadness"	2004	The Happening	As Deep as We Can Go Without Drowning
"Searchlight"	2004	The Happening	As Deep as We Can Go Without Drowning
"Live Girls"	2007	Freddy Fresh	Surrounded by Funk
"Hope Is Existence"	2012	Cult with No Name	Above as Below
"Maitre D-Day"	2012	Cult with No Name	Above as Below
"Drowned"	2012	Cult with No Name	Above as Below
"Today the Day (They Knew Would Come)"	2012	Cult with No Name, Meg Maryatt	Above as Below
"Numbers"	2012	Cult with No Name	Above as Below
"What's Certain"	2012	Cult with No Name	Above as Below
"Shake Hands with the Devil"	2012	Cult with No Name	Above as Below
"Secondary Sexual Characteristics"	2012	Cult with No Name	Above as Below
"Escape Under Blankets"	2013	Jilk	Retreat…
"Everything Lasts on Age"	2014	Cult with No Name	Another Landing
"A Pound of Penny Gaffs"	2014	Cult with No Name	Another Landing
"Swept Away"	2014	Cult with No Name	Another Landing
"Every Litte Box"	2014	Cult with No Name	Another Landing
"Those Weren't the Days"	2014	Cult with No Name	Another Landing
"Not Stranger Than Fiction"	2014	Cult with No Name	Another Landing
"Walter + Wally"	2014	Cult with No Name	Another Landing
"Over and Out of Here"	2014	Cult with No Name	Another Landing
"Dorothy"	2015	Tuxedomoon, Cult with No Name	Blue Velvet Revisited
"Frank"	2015	Tuxedomoon, Cult with No Name	Blue Velvet Revisited
"Sunshine (Tricky Remix)"	2015	Mexican Institute of Sound, Toy Selectah	Non-album single
"Coma (Cult with No Name Remodel)"	2016	S'Express, Cult with No Name	Enjoy This Trip
"Kiss Kiss Bang Bang"	2017	The Eden House	Songs for the Broken Ones
"Rosabelle, Believe"	2017	Cult with No Name	Heir of the Dog
"Fingertips"	2017	Cult with No Name	Heir of the Dog
"When I Was a Girl"	2017	Cult with No Name	Heir of the Dog
"Yves Klein's Blues"	2017	Cult with No Name	Heir of the Dog
"Just Rewards"	2017	Cult with No Name	Heir of the Dog
"Of California"	2017	Cult with No Name	Heir of the Dog
"No News"	2017	Cult with No Name	Heir of the Dog
"Blind Dogs for the Guides"	2019	Cult with No Name	Mediaburn
"Needle and Thread"	2019	Cult with No Name	Mediaburn
"In Hollywood You Won't Find Bel-Air"	2019	Cult with No Name	Mediaburn
"She Sells Incels"	2019	Cult with No Name	Mediaburn
"So Much Left to Undo"	2019	Cult with No Name	Mediaburn
"By Air or by Sea"	2019	Cult with No Name	Mediaburn
"Low on High"	2019	Cult with No Name	Mediaburn
"Mona"	2019	Cult with No Name	Mediaburn
"All This Spite (Comes at a Price)"	2019	Cult with No Name	Mediaburn
"All Those Things I Admire"	2021	Cult with No Name	Nights in North Sentinel
"Fight or Flight"	2021	Cult with No Name	Nights in North Sentinel
"You're All I Ever Needed"	2021	Cult with No Name	Nights in North Sentinel
"After the Storm"	2021	Cult with No Name	Nights in North Sentinel
"Home Again"	2021	Cult with No Name	Nights in North Sentinel
"Bulletproof"	2021	Cult with No Name	Nights in North Sentinel
"Cult with No Name"	2021	Cult with No Name	Nights in North Sentinel

== Filmography ==
- Ghostdriver (self-directed & written independent film in which Ali also stars alongside ensemble cast) (Post-Production initially due for release in Summer 2023 TBC)

== Personal life ==
Ali was brought up in the suburbs of Birmingham. She is of Irish, English, and Indian descent. She bought her first guitar when she was 15. In a 2002 interview, she described herself as a practitioner of kung-fu and a student of Taoism. In a 2019 interview, she stated she was "not religious at all", but "love[d] yoga and some of the Vedic philosophies, meditation and the idea that we are all intrinsically connected with every single thing around us." On her political views, she stated that "the whole idea of any kind of union other than that of a human union for the good of all human beings is outdated anyway in my view. Politics to me have always been insane. The fundamental problem with all political systems, is that they are based on the tiny amount of knowledge about our situation that we have as human beings."
