= Museum Week =

Annual global event

MuseumWeek is a global event that takes place during one week, each year with the participation of all kinds of cultural institutions, museums, libraries, archives and heritage centers, both in situ and on social media.

MuseumWeek started in 2014 with a collaboration of twelve French museums wishing to expand their audience. Each year the event promotes a different international cause.

In 2015, its second year, MuseumWeek became a leading global cultural event on Twitter.

A global community of artists and professionals from cultural organizations have formed surrounding the event

MuseumWeek is supported by the French association Culture For Causes Network [archive].

In 2022, MuseumWeek organized the first digital art exhibition at UNESCO, "Réconciliation avec le vivant [archive]"

== History ==
Institutions open their doors both virtually and physically. On Twitter, they use seven hashtags (including the hashtag #MuseumWeek), using a different hashtag each day for a week (see table below). In their first year, MuseumWeek brought together almost 700 European institutions.

"A global operation conceived and launched in France, MuseumWeek is a valuable tool for promoting the cultural influence of our country," said Fleur Pellerin, Minister of Culture in 2015.

In 2015, the Cité des Sciences et de l'Industrie organized an event asking one question: "What is the cultural heritage of our time that will be passed on to future generations?" In response, the institution set out to archive all Tweets featuring the word #MuseumWeek in a time capsule. With a size of 60 × 30 × 28.6 cm and a weight of 30 kilos, the capsule is composed of acrylic, glass, carbon fibre, and metal. Sealed on March 29, 2015 at midnight, it will not be opened before 2035 and contains information for future generations about our way of life and our consumption of art in 2015.

The 4th event took place in 2017 on new platforms: Instagram, Snapchat, the Chinese social network Weibo, and the Russian network Vkontakte.

In 2016, MuseumWeek mobilized 2,200 institutions, museums, libraries, and galleries and, in 2017, expanded to 75 countries. Almost 5,000 institutions, from 120 different countries, participated in 2018.

In 2019, MuseumWeek, used the hashtag #WomenInCulture to highlight the place of women in culture in the past, present, and future. Among the events was one in Paris with the artist Adelaide Damoah at the Cite nationale de l’histoire de l’immigration and in New York at Michele Mariaud Gallery with Laurence de Valmy.

In 2020, MuseumWeek partnered with MTArt Agency founded by Marine Tanguy to promote the event.

Unesco has supported the event since 2016.

Year	Monday	Tuesday	Wednesday	Thursday	Friday	Saturday	Sunday
2014; 24–30 March	#CoulissesMW	#QuizzMW	#LoveMW	#ImagineMW	#QuestionMW	#ArchiMW	#CreaMW
2015; 23–29 March	#SecretsMW	#SouvenirsMW	#ArchitectureMW	#InspirationMW	#FamilyMW	#FavMW	#PoseMW
2016; 28 March – 3 April	#SecretsMW	#PeopleMW	#ArchitectureMW	#HeritageMW	#FutureMW	#ZoomMW	#LoveMW
2017; 19–25 June	#FoodMW	#SportsMW	#MusicMW	#StoriesMW	#BooksMW	#TravelsMW	#HeritageMW
2018; 23–29 April	#WomenMW	#CityMW	#HeritageMW	#ProfessionsMW	#KidsMW	#NatureMW	#DifferenceMW
2019; 13–19 May	#WomenInCulture	#SecretsMW	#PlayMW	#RainbowMW	#ExploreMW	#PhotoMW	#FriendsMW
2020; 11–17 May	#HeroesMW	#CultureInQuarantineMW	#TogetherMW	#MuseumMomentsMW	#ClimateMW	#TechnologyMW	#DreamsMW
2021; 7–13 June	#OnceUponAtimeMW	#BehindTheScenesMW	#ChildrensEyesMW	#EurekaMW	#CaptionThisMW	#ArtIsEverywhereMW	#WordsForTheFutureMW
2022; 13–19 June	#InnovationMW	#CreatorsMW	#FreedomMW	#SexualityMW	#EnvironmentMW	#LifeLessonsMW	#DanceMW
2023; 5–11 June	#EnvironmentMW	#Web3MW	#FoodMW	#OceansMW	#aiMW	#HeritageMW	#SunMW
2024; 3–9 June	#BehindTheScenesMW	#ArtificialIntelligenceMW	#BiodiversityMW	#NatureSelfieMW	#UrbanNatureMW	#WaterMW	#CoexistMW
2025; 2–8 June	#AImuseumsMW	#MovementMW	#GameMW	#TogethernessMW	#AccessibilityMW	#VisitMuseumsMW	#OceansMW
