= Cité nationale de l'histoire de l'immigration =

Museum in Paris, France

Coordinates: 48°50′7″N 2°24′34″E

The Musée nationale de l'histoire de l'immigration (French pronunciation: [site nɑsjɔnal də listwaʁ də limiɡʁaɑsjɔ̃]) is a museum of immigration history located in the 12th arrondissement of Paris at 293, avenue Daumesnil. The nearest métro station is Porte Dorée. It is open Tuesday through Friday from 10 a.m. to 5:30 p.m. and weekends from 10 a.m. to 7 p.m.; there is an admission fee.

The museum was conceived in 1989 by Algerian immigrant Zaïr Kédadouche, supported initially by historians including Pierre Milza and Gérard Noiriel, but the idea was paused in 1993. The 1998 French World Cup win reunified the people of France, and former Prime Minister Lionel Jospin approved its creation almost immediately. Years passed and hope for the Museum to come to fruition faded until President Jacques Chirac was reelected in 2002. He put Jacques Toubon in charge of bringing the Museum to life with a mission to "contribute to the recognition of the integration of immigrants into French society and advance the views and attitudes on immigration in France". It opened without public ceremony in late 2007 under his successor, President Nicolas Sarkozy, amid political controversy in which eight of the twelve academics involved in the project resigned.

The museum occupies the Palais de la Porte Dorée, a historical monument in Paris, which was built in 1931 to serve as the Colonial International Exhibition's museum dedicated to the colonies. Owing to the Palais de la Porte Dorée's colonial history and deep ties to the French Empire, space in the museum is dedicated to informing guests of its history, and one of the first temporary exhibits was of the year 1931. However, there is also some controversy surrounding the theme of reducing all immigration to colonialist origin which can be seen as demeaning and confusing to some. The museum was also formerly the home of the Musée national des Arts d'Afrique et d'Océanie, on the edge of the Bois de Vincennes. Its tropical aquarium is still located in the cellar and remains open to the public. It contains over 1100 m^{2} of exhibition space devoted primarily to the history and culture of immigration in France from the early nineteenth century to the present. A permanent installation, "Benchmarks", contains interactive exhibits presenting immigrant stories in multimedia form. The Abdelmalek Sayad multimedia library house, which is located in the museum, contains a diverse collection of books, films, and other types of media related to the themes of the museum. The collection is accessible online through the museum's portal.

The museum's collections are organized by three main themes: images including photography by Eugène Atget, Gérald Bloncourt, Robert Capa, Yves Jackson, Jean Jacques Pottier, etc., as well as prints, posters, drawings press, cartoons, comic books, audiovisual materials; objects of daily life; and works of art concerning immigration, territory, borders, and roots.

In May 2019 it hosted an event with the artist Adelaide Damoah during Museum Week.

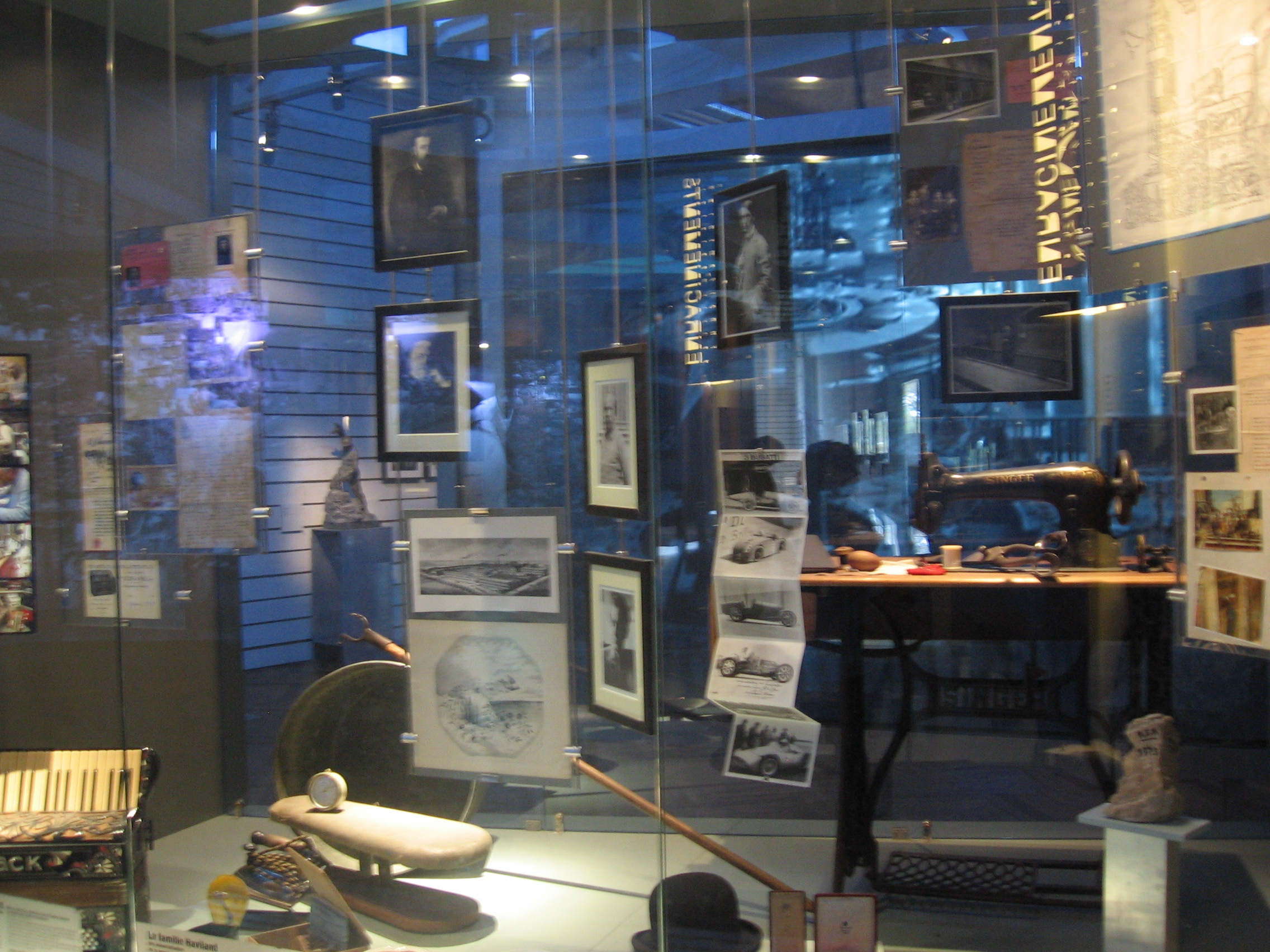
Permanent exhibition.

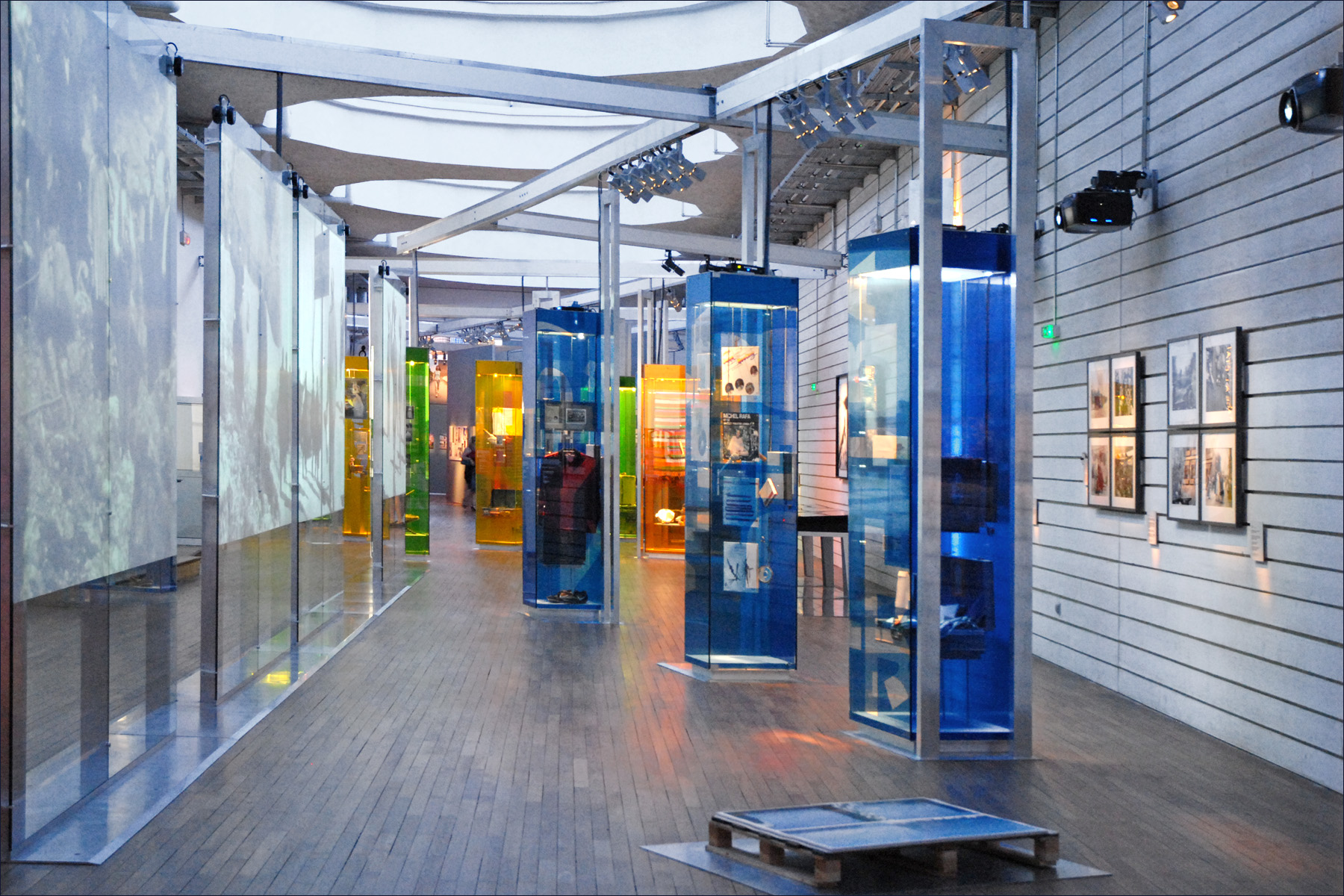
Permanent exhibition.

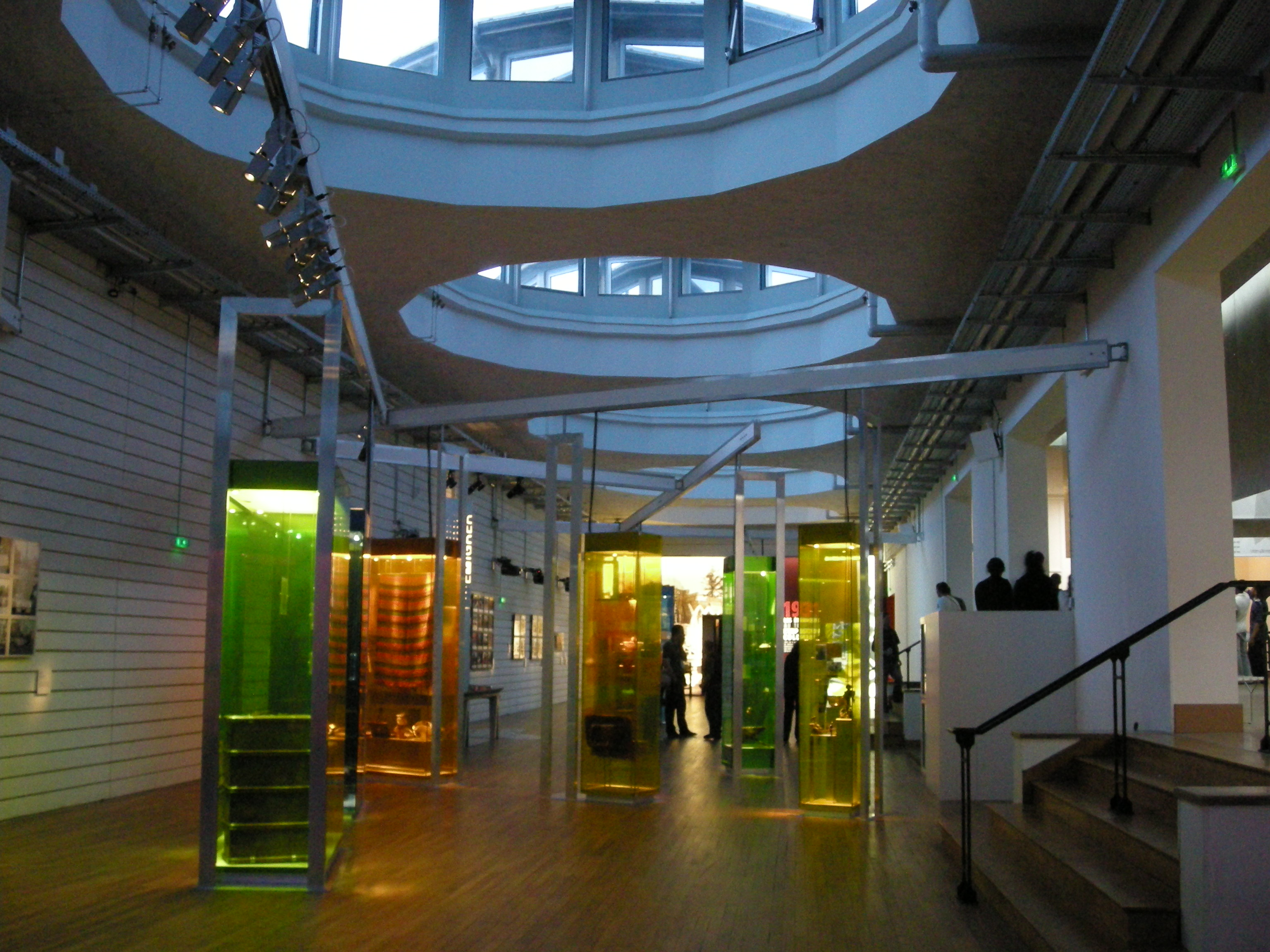
Permanent exhibition.

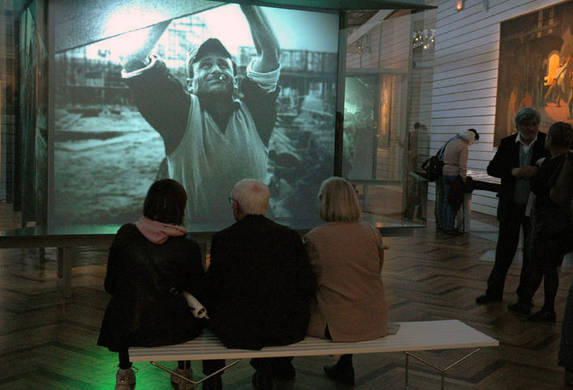
Permanent exhibition.

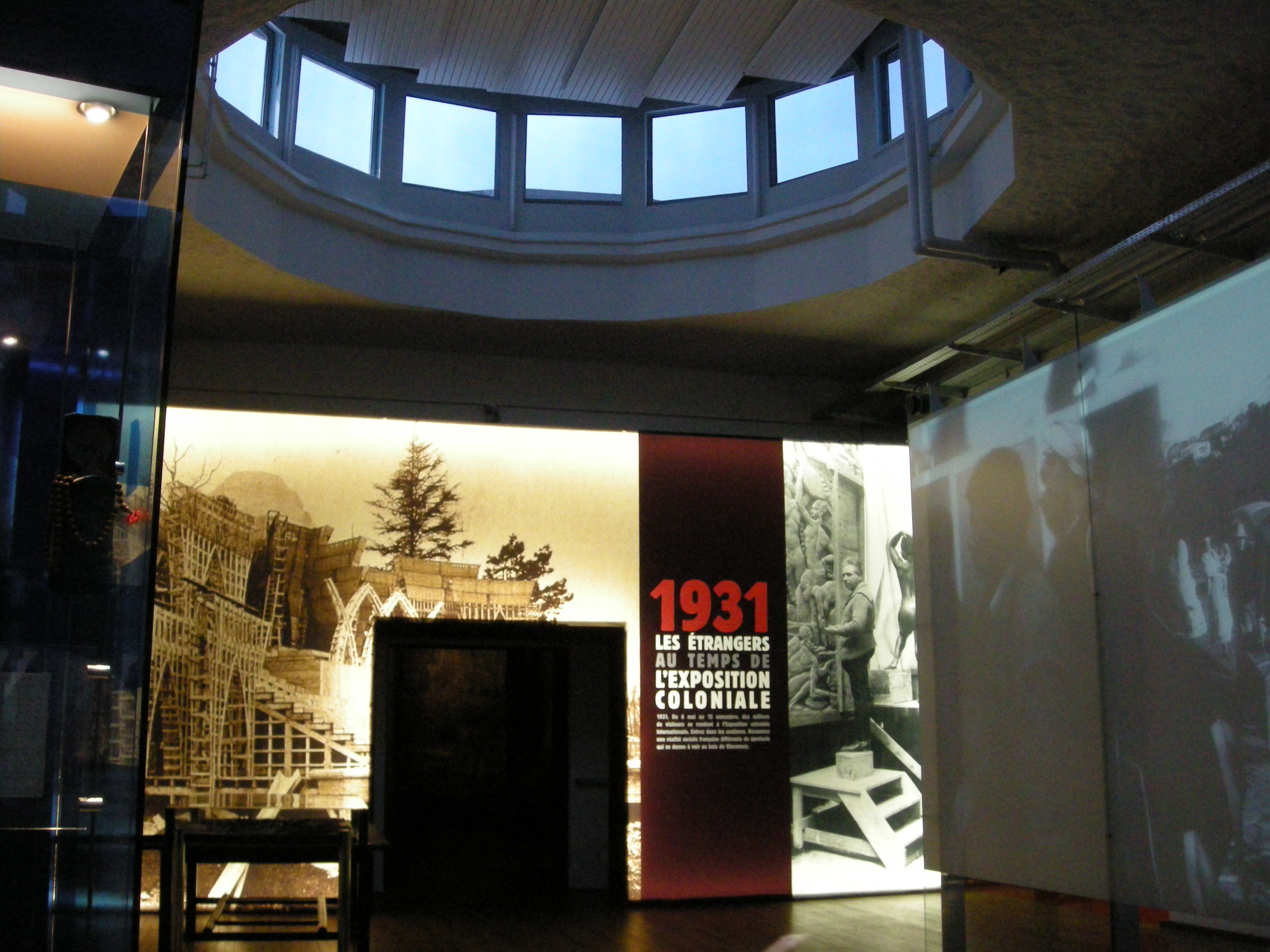
Temporary exhibition « 1931, les étrangers au temps de l'Exposition coloniale » (2008).

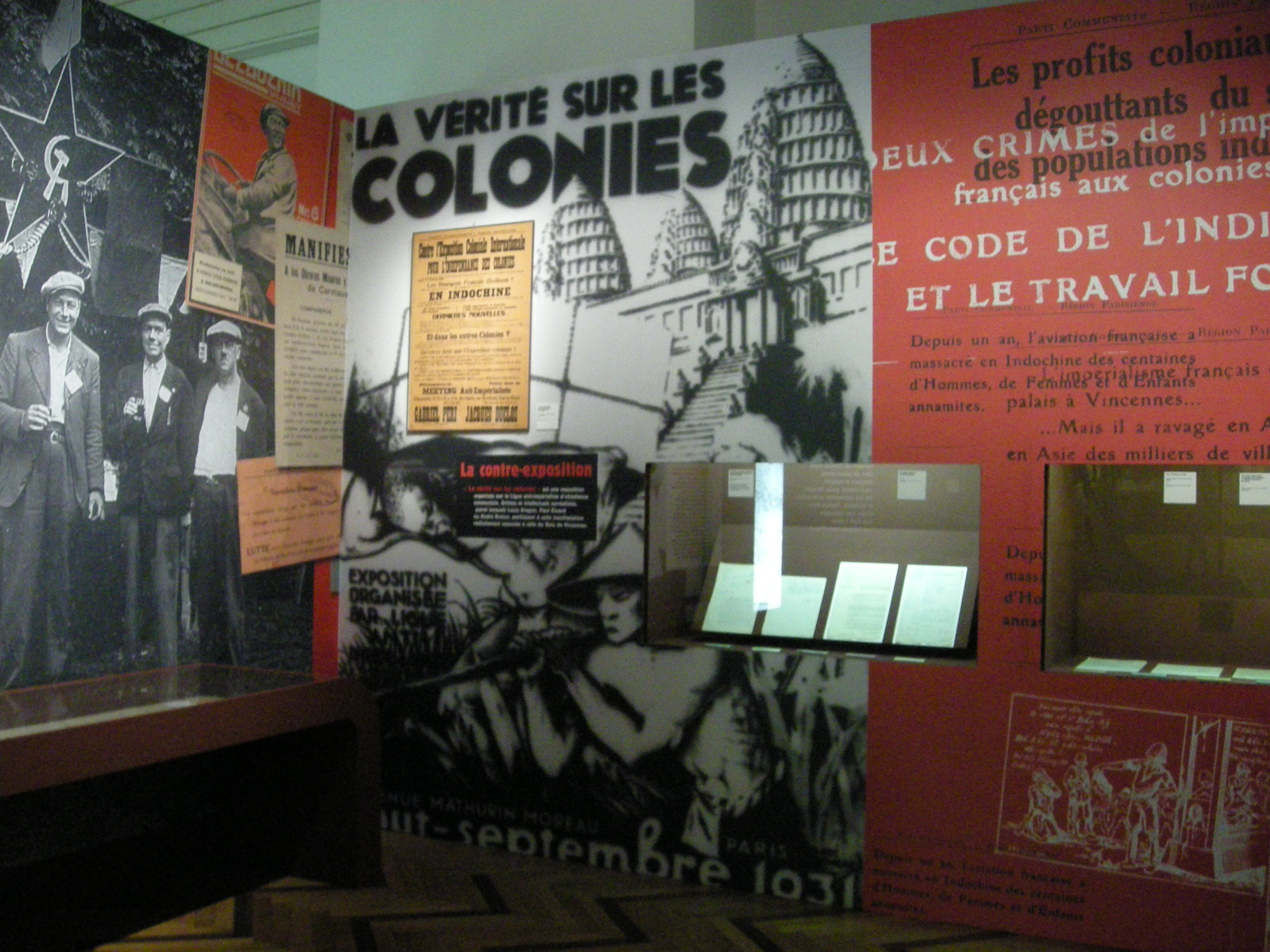
Temporary exhibition « 1931, les étrangers au temps de l'Exposition coloniale » (2008).

== See also ==
- List of museums in Paris

== General references ==
- Cité nationale de l'histoire de l'immigration
- ParisInfo description
- ParisInfo article on museum opening
- Evene.fr article on museum opening (French)
- La République des Lettres, Paris, samedi 28 juin 2008 (French)
- My Paris Your Paris description
