= Chido Cleopatra Mpemba =

Zimbabwean diplomat and politician

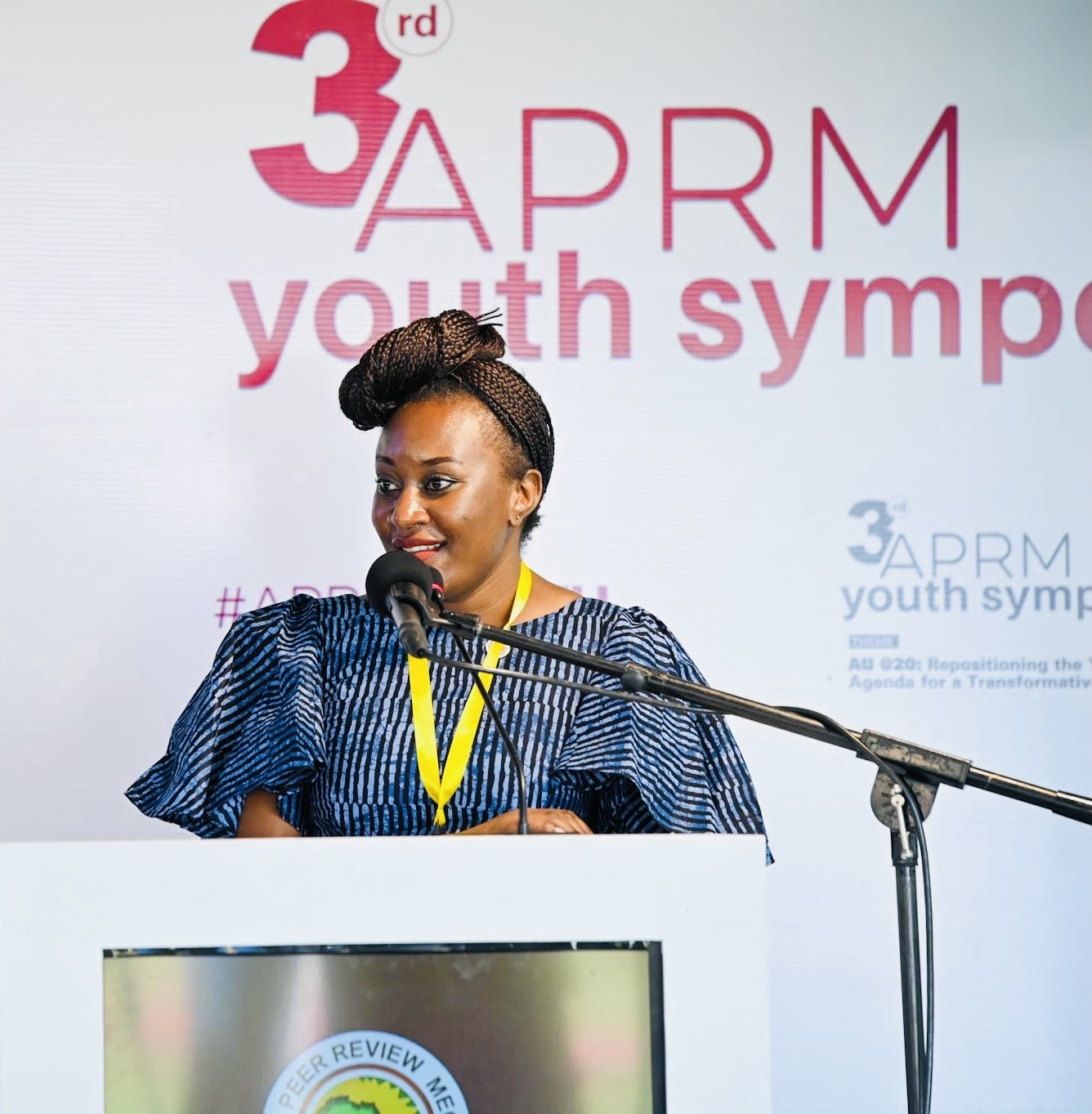
- Chido Mpemba During her Keynote Speech at the 3rd APRM Youth Symposium in Uganda - 5 July 2022

African Union (AU) Special Advisor to the Chairperson
- Incumbent
- Assumed office July 2025
- President: H.E. Mahmoud Youssif

African Union (AU) Special Envoy for Youth
- In office November 2021 – June 2025
- President: Moussa Faki
- Preceded by: Aya Chebbi

Advisor to Minister of Youth, Sport, Arts and Recreation
- In office April 2020 – November 2020
- Minister: Kirsty Coventry

Personal details
- Born: Chido Cleopatra Mpemba; 1988 (age 37–38) Zimbabwe
- Occupation: Diplomat; advisor; speaker; moderator; politician

Chido Cleopatra Mpemba (born July 1988) is a Zimbabwean-born public servant, pan-African leader, and gender, women and youth’s empowerment advocate. She currently serves as the Special Advisor to H.E. Mahmoud Youssif, Chairperson of the African Union Commission for the 2025–2028 Cabinet term under the portfolio on women, gender and youth. She is the first woman to be appointed in his cabinet and also the youngest advisor to a senior elected official, appointed in the history of the African Union Commission. Previously, she held the position of Special Envoy on Youth under Chairperson H.E. Moussa Faki Mahamat (2021–2024). Chido is also a Non‑Executive Director and a Member of the Board at Plan International, Inc.

She is also Co‑Chair and Commissioner of the World Health Organization Commission on Social Connection alongside Surgeon Vivek Murphy who served under the American Presidency of Barack Obama and Joe Biden

== Early life and education ==
Ms. Mpemba was born in 1988 to Gladys and Shepherd Mpemba at the Mbuya Nehanda Maternity Clinic in Harare, was raised in Bulawayo and went to Girls' College High School. Prior to completing a Masters in Business Administration at Midlands State University (2014–2016), she earned her degree in Labour Organisational Psychology and Human Resource Management from Cape Town University in South Africa. She studied Leadership in Business at Dartmouth College during her Mandela Washington Fellowship in 2016. She also obtained a Scholarship and Studying for a Masters in Public Diplomacy and Sustainable Development at LUISS School of Government and United Nations Institute of Training and Research.

== Career ==
Chido Mpemba started her career as a banker at Standard Chartered Bank from July 2012 – December 2019 where she served as a Senior Manager and spearheaded a risk digitization program under a portfolio of 15 000 clients with exposure of US$70 Million across financial products. She went on to take a 2 year career break during the Covid-19 Pandemic before her appointment to the African Union. During her career transition period she did some free-lance work for the World Economic Forum and to the Zimbabwe Minister of Youth and World Olympian, Kirsty Coventry.

She Served as Special Envoy on Youth to AUC Chairperson Moussa Faki Mahamat from November 2021 to March 2025, becoming the youngest diplomat in the chairperson’s cabinet. In this role led the youth agenda of Agenda 2063 and creating a legacy of initiatives and historic decisions on youth policies and empowerment adopted by Heads of States of the 55 Governments which make up the African Union

Chido championed initiatives on Digital Transformation and Artificial Intelligence by pioneering the Make Africa Digital (M.A.D) campaign which has trained over 8,000 youth in 9 countries to date on Digital Literacy and in September 2024 at the United Nations Headquarters launched a policy brief on Artificial Intelligence for Sustainable Youth Development in Africa. She also created a Mental Health Toolkit on 5 Emerging Issues affecting the mental health of the young people in Africa which has been used globally for psychosocial support

Under her leadership the African Union Commission appointed a President Champion on Youth, Peace and Security, Secured seats for the inclusion of young people and women in the African Union procurement board, there was a 45% increase of youth as election observers in the historic year of presidential elections across Africa to 45% and in addition an increase young women appointed into parliament, ministerial and other government positions across the continent.

Chido has pioneered the Socials With a Purpose (S.W.A.P) dialogues, previously in partnership with Mercedes Benz, as a convening to bring communities together and discuss critical issues in the context of gender, mental health and Gender Based Violence (GBV).

== Leadership roles ==
- Emerging Security Sector Leader (ESSL), Africa Center of Strategic Studies, National Defense University, U.S Department of Defense.
- Board Member & Trustee, Old Mutual Youth Fund
- Global Leader Council (GLC) Member, GenU Co-chaired by UNICEF Executive Director & PWC Global Chairman.
- Leadership Council Member, AFRICA Reach Chaired by H.E Monica Geingos First Lady of Namibia and Current President of Organisation of Africa First Ladies.
- 2016 Mandela Washington Fellow, President Obama’s Young African Leaders Initiative
- Climate Reality Leader, Trained by Former VP U.S Al Gore.
- Former Advisor to Minister of Youth, Sport, Arts and Recreation Kirsty Coventry
- Global Award winning banker and private sector risk professional at Standard Chartered Bank.
- Appointed to serve as Non‑Executive Director and Board Member of Plan International, Inc. Corporation, focusing on governance, girls’ rights, and youth leadership with effective 1 July 2025
- Appointed Co‑Chair and Commissioner of the WHO Commission on Social Connection in September 2023, working alongside U.S. Surgeon General Dr. Vivek Murthy to address loneliness and social isolation. Championed a decision at the 78th World Health Assembly, a historic resolution on social connection, the first-ever in WHO history.
- Worked with Public Figures such as David Beckham and featured as a change maker in campaign on Zero Malaria in Africa.
- Recognized by the Gates Foundation and featured with Bill Gates for the Foundation’s 25th Anniversary and announcement of giving out the majority of his wealth towards development in the next 20 years and to direct the bulk of his wealth toward Africa’s development.

== Publications and opinion pieces ==
- UNITED NATIONS opinion on by Chido Mpemba
- UNITED NATIONS opinion on by Chido Mpemba – Empowering Africa's Youth: A Commitment to Our Future | Africa Renewal
- WORLD BANK Blog on Transforming education and skills development in Africa by Chido Mpemba and World Bank Global Director for Education, Luis Benveniste: Transforming education and skills development in Africa
- DEVEX Opinion on Africa’s Youth in changing the world order by Chido Mpemba, the Minister of Education for Sierra Leonne Chernor Bah and CEO for Plan International Stephen Omollo: Opinion: Africa’s youth will change the world order.
- Opinion on how Africa’s youth will drive global growth by Chido Mpemba and the Head of Africa for the World Economic Forum Chido Munyati: How will Africa's youth population drive global growth? | World Economic Forum
- UNESCO Blog on putting a spotlight on foundation learning across Africa : Chido Mpemba putting a spotlight on foundational learning across Africa - World Education Blog
- GOOGLE blog on Unlocking Africa’s Potential – Why Digital Skills are Crucial for the Future of Work by Chido Mpemba: Unlocking Africa's Potential - Why Digital Skills are Crucial for the Future of Work
- MAIL & GUARDIAN Thought Leader Opinion Column on mobilizing Africa’s Youth for Political Change by Chido Mpemba and Nyasha Mpani (PHD), Data For Governance Alliance Project : Mobilise Africa’s youth for political change
