= Antigirl =

American artist (born 1981)

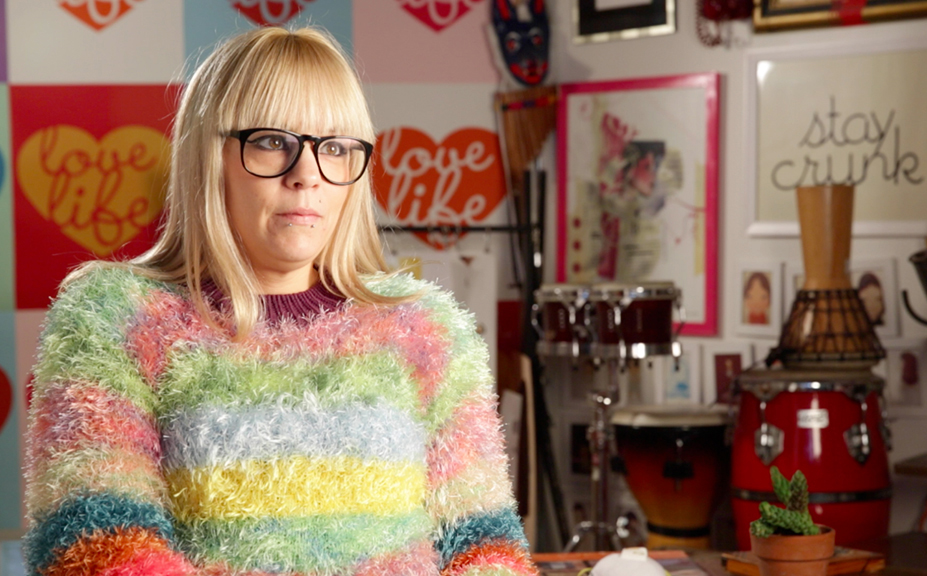
- Antigirl in 2014
- Born: Tiphanie Brooke; 1981 (age 44–45); Phoenix, Arizona
- Education: Phoenix College; Art Center College of Design
- Known for: Painting
- Movement: Collage; Graphic design Street art
- Website: antigirl.work

Tiphanie Brooke (born 1981), known professionally as Antigirl, is an American multidisciplinary artist and graphic designer, best known for her series of heart paintings, street art and collages.

== Early life and education ==
Brooke was born and raised in Phoenix, Arizona, and spent part of her childhood in San Pedro, California. She attended Phoenix College, and later the Art Center College of Design in Pasadena, California, receiving her BFA in graphic design.

== Career ==
=== Painting and design ===
Brooke has said that she adopted the name Antigirl in 1999 after a friend asked, "Why are you so anti, girl?" The moniker would become her project and brand name. She first started incorporating hearts into her work in 2009 with a print pack called A Dozen Hearts; her Hearts collection has since grown into a large project that includes public and private installations, exhibitions and commissioned artwork. In 2010, she started taking photographs, winning an award from Phoenix College for a deconstructed photo she took. The photo was later displayed at the Phoenix Art Museum.

While living in Phoenix, she started going out at night to paste prints of her work on abandoned buildings and in alleys around the city. Her heart murals have been pasted around Los Angeles, including her All Heart in L.A. mural in the city's Sunset Junction neighborhood, and her Bleeding Hearts series, with dripping paint and sometimes glitter. After showing her work mostly online for nearly a decade, she started doing street art as a way to make her work larger scale and to display it on a more local level.

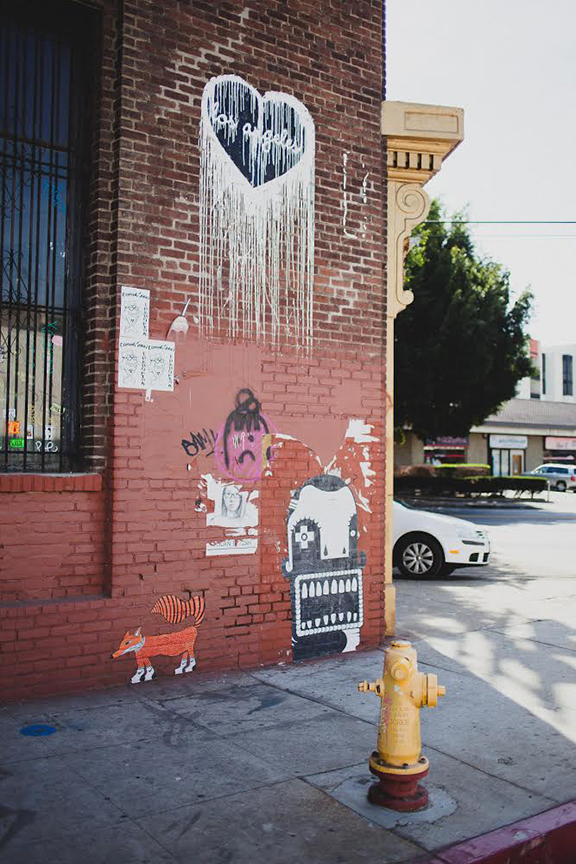
Heart Los Angeles Glitter and ink on bond paper, white acrylic paint, 40" x 32" 2014, Los Angeles

Brooke's work has appeared at shows in the United States, Canada and Belgium. Her first solo show, Tart, was exhibited at Uppercase Gallery in Calgary, Alberta, and featured the debut of her Women series. The series was later shown at galleries including Ann Street Gallery in New York in 2007 and Undercurrent Arts in Miami in 2008. In September 2010, she created a heart mural, Heart No. 23, on a two-story wall at the Phoenicia Association in Phoenix. In 2012, while preparing for a solo show in Phoenix, her father was diagnosed with pancreatic cancer, and she started writing the phrase "Love Life" on her work. This later morphed into "Love life/fuck life."

On June 27, 2014, the Living Room at the W Hotel in Los Angeles-Westwood was transformed into an art space to display the works of Antigirl, for an exhibit that was on display for a month. The exhibit included her Heart of Los Angeles, a work that was initially designed in response to Milton Glaser's iconic 1977 I Heart New York logo. In September 2014, Antigirl put on her first glow-in-the-dark art exhibit, at the Standard Hotel in downtown Los Angeles.

Her graphic design clients include The New Yorker, The New York Times, Nylon, Teen Vogue, Computer Arts Magazine, Elemente Magazine, Showtime, SuicideGirls and Automata Studios. In 2019, Brooke was featured in the Polaris catalogue produced by Visual Collaborative, she was interviewed alongside other practitioners from around the world.

=== Style ===
Brooke works in mixed media, using papers, glues, inks, paints and digital alterations. She blends traditional materials with techniques using modern technology and includes screen printing, photography, typography, printmaking, illustration and painting. Her work is often sweet, with a contrary, punk attitude.

== Exhibitions (selected) ==
- Tart, Uppercase Gallery, Calgary, AB, 2005
- Ann Street Gallery, New York, NY, 2007
- Visual Collaborative at Undercurrent Arts, Miami, FL, 2008
- Phoenix Art Museum, Phoenix, AZ, 2010
- Phoenix Design Week, Phoenix, AZ, 2010
- Antigirl Hearts Show, Phoenicia Association, Phoenix, AZ, 2011
- The Living Room, W Hotel, Los Angeles, CA, 2014
- The First Glow-In-the-Dark Exhibit, The Standard Hotel, Los Angeles, CA, 2014

== Honors and awards ==
- Photography Award, Phoenix College, 2010
  1. 23, Phoenix New Times 100 Creatives, 2010

== Personal life ==
In 2012, Brooke relocated from Phoenix to Los Angeles, California.
