= Coppé =

Japanese musician (born 1967)

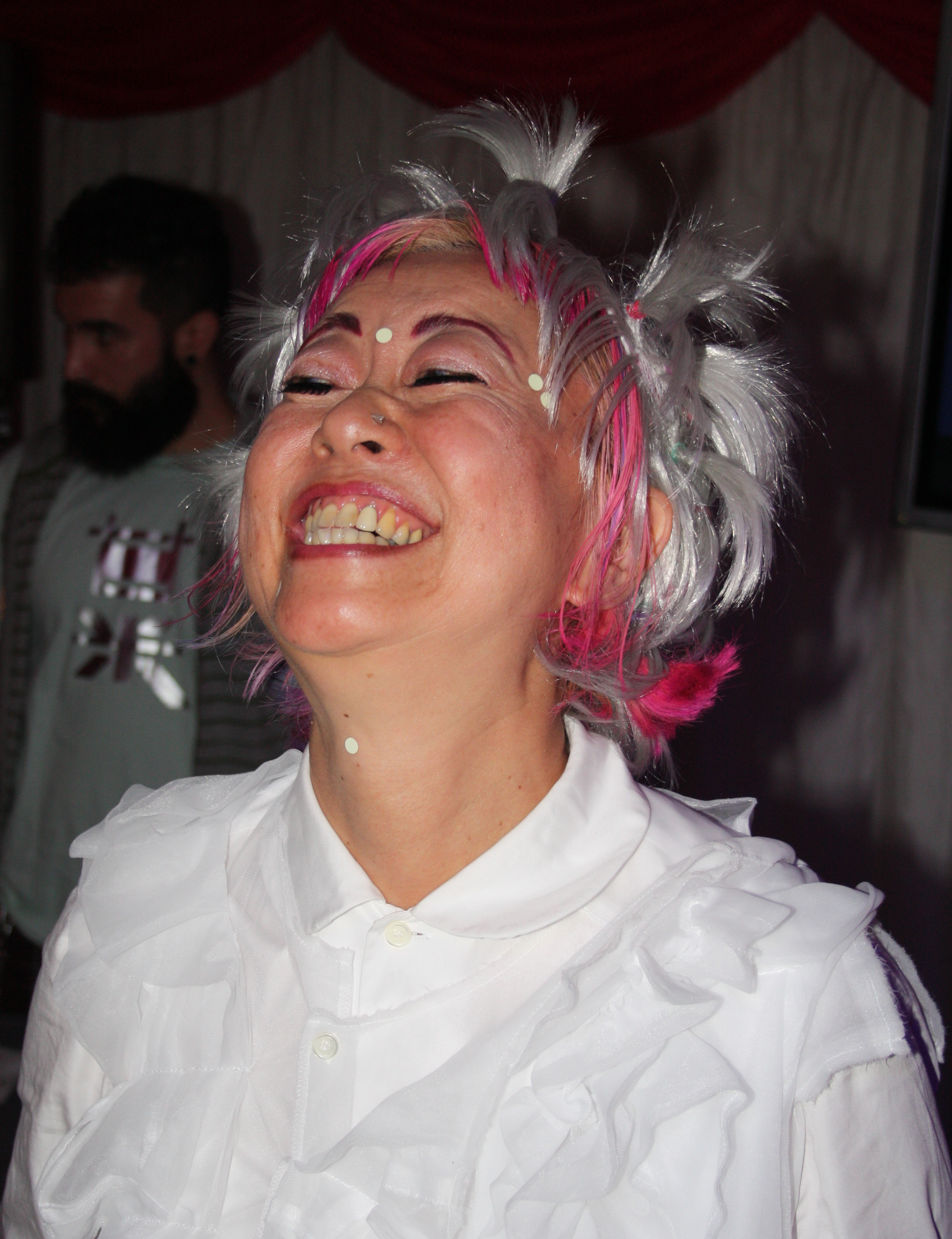
- Coppé

Background information
- Born: Yoshimi; April 23, 1967 (age 59); Tokyo, Japan
- Origin: Japan
- Genres: Electronica, experimental, pop, jazz
- Occupations: Singer, artist, DJ, music producer, songwriter
- Instruments: DJ, pads, and piano
- Years active: 1995–present
- Labels: Mango + Sweetrice, Bit-Phalanx
- Website: www.sweetrice.com

Coppé (pronounced Co-pa'y, often also typed Coppe') is a Japanese electronic music singer-songwriter and music producer. She has affectionately gained the title of "The Legendary Godmother of Japanese Electronica". She has released fifteen solo albums on her self-owned Mango + Sweetrice label. She released the most acclaimed album of her career, "8", in 2004.

== Early life ==
Coppé was born and raised in Tokyo. Her real name is Yoshimi, which means pure, good and beautiful in Japanese. She was given the nickname Coppé by her mother because on her birth day she resembled a loaf of bread of the same name.

As a child, Coppé travelled frequently between Japan and Hawaii, and also lived for a while in Arizona. She studied classical piano and ballet from the age of three. As a child she won a "Best Song for Children" of Nihon Record Taisho award (sometimes called "Japanese Grammy") for her song "Peke No Uta", which was released via King Records. She also won a Chibikko Nodojiman award while still in elementary school singing her original song "Red Red Balloon". Also while still a child she began to appear regularly on a weekly NHK TV show "Uta Wa Tomodachi". This led to her getting involved with radio, her first regular show being "All Night Nippon". She later also had shows on FM Tokyo and FM Yokohama. Her English language skills led to her being on an NHK show that teaches English. Other TV shows in which she made regular appearances were TBS's "Jikan Desuyo" and "Ginza Now", NTV's "Shower Gang," and the music program "Poppers MTV," where she interviewed many foreign artists including Ray Charles, Bob Marley, James Brown, Madonna, the Police, Cyndi Lauper, and Michael Jackson. After her father's death, she relocated to Honolulu to be closer to her mother. In Hawaii, she also had a radio program on KIKI AM 83.

== Mickey Mouse collector ==
Coppé also became known as a world class expert and collector of Disney goods, mostly Mickey Mouse related items. She has a vast collection of goods, many from the 1930s, 40s, and 50s. In May 2020, Coppé appeared in the Visual Collaborative electronic catalog, in an issue called TwentyEightyFour, she talks about a Mickey Mouse piece created in the 30s, which Lasse Åberg gave to her.

== As a musician ==
While developing as a radio and TV personality, Coppé continued to write and perform original music. In 1995, she retired from commercial radio to devote herself full-time to music creation.

That year, Coppé moved to the US, establishing Mango + Sweetrice Records from which she released her first, self-produced and self-titled debut album. Coppé's music references many influences from ambient to noise, but is generally electronic, "IDM" and club oriented.

Coppé works with a wide palette of instruments to construct her musical universe. She created her debut album Coppé entirely on a TEAC Reel-to-Reel, transitioning through Yamaha DX7 to the Nord Lead and her current instrument of choice, Teenage Engineering's versatile OP-1. Outside the synth world Coppé employs unconventional instruments including the 5-octave mbira, nail violin, and meatgrinder.

Coppé characteristically processes her vocals to create a broad range of effects that she likens to "angels whispering," "colors of the wind," and "orange sorbet sunsets" with equipment including the Digitech 300 and TC helicon.

On 27 June 2005, a YouTube channel called "slvgdvg" posted a short-length version of Coppé's music video entitled "I Lick My Brain In Silence." It is the first known music video to be published on YouTube and has more than 30k views as of March 2022. It is only available in 144p quality. Later, Coppé republished the original, full-length version of the same music video on her official YouTube Channel, but with the quality improved to 480p. This video has over 11k views as of March 2022.

Coppé co-creates with some of the electronic music/IDM scene's most influential artists. These include Plaid, Kettel, Q-Bert, DJ Vadim, Christ (ex-Boards Of Canada), Atom™, Tipsy, Addictive TV, Kelli Ali (ex-Sneaker Pimps), Bola, Modified Toy Orchestra, Sutekh, Kit Clayton, Peanut Butter Wolf, members of Skinny Puppy, Takemura Nobukazu, Barbara Morgenstern, DJ Kensei, Fred moTh, Hifana, Jemapur and more.

Coppé performs regularly in Japan and the US, also touring the UK and Europe every autumn since 2010, in collaboration with UK-based Bit-Phalanx Music label since 2011.

In 2015, Coppé celebrated the 20th anniversary of Mango + Sweetrice Records with the release of 20rpm. To mark the occasion, Mango + Sweetrice and Bit-Phalanx Music produced an all-day festival of Electronic Music in central London, also called 20rpm, held at St. Giles in the Fields church, Soho. The event featured special guests Plaid, Bola, Kettel, Christ., Barbara Morgenstern, Kelli Ali, Earth Is Flat, DJ Mixmaster Morris, DJ Nick Luscombe and more.

20rpm became an annual event with the second edition in 2016 (21rpm), featuring Graham Massey (808 State), Plaid, Funkstörung, Leila, Luke Vibert, Seefeel, sarasara and DJ Flint Kids.

In 2017, Coppé released Milk. Produced with diverse electronic collaborators including Nikakoi, Atom™ and Kettel, Milk re-envisions jazz standards through a prism of contemporary electronic and ambient esthetics. Bleep.com wrote, "The result is an album that at moments could be the incidental ambience from Blade Runner shot through the synth bank of Portishead."

Unconventional esthetic statements in collaboration with Japanese fashion designer Comme des Garçons and lyric references to outer space are a unique feature of Coppé's creations. "I feel very comfortable floating, like swimming in the air," she wrote. "I want to live in a clear bubble and meditate singing…like the blue people in the Fantastic Planet by [French animator] René Laloux."

In 2023, Coppé appeared on the UK Top 10 album "Optical Delusion" by UK Electronic band Orbital, featuring on the track 'Moon Princess'.

== Discography ==
Albums:

- 1995 "Coppé"
- 1997 "O of M with Coppé"
- 1999 "Peppermint"
- 2000 "Mercury"
- 2001 "Papa My Buddha"
- 2002 "oTo"
- 2003 "Nauru"
- 2004 "8"
- 2005 "9+10=10th Anniversary!"
- 2007 "Fi-lamenté"
- 2010 "Artificial Insemination"
- 2010 "Coppé In A Pill"
- 2011 "Yogurt"
- 2012 "Rays"
- 2012 "Rays" / "Coppé In A Bloc"
- 2012 "Coppe' Who? (Aloha From Mars!)"
- 2013 "Void"
- 2015 "20rpm"
- 2017 "Milk"
- 2019 "Na Na Me Na Opera"
- 2021 "Mitsu (25rpm)"
- 2022 "*(Un-)tweaked"
- 2024 "*( -)tweaked"
- 2025 “30rpm (I Wish I Had A Brain)”

Singles:

- 1997 "Blue Time Machine"
- 2000 "Blue"
- 2012 "Forbidden/My Heartbeatz Become Earthquake"
- 2020 "Fever (Don't Give Me)"

EPs:

- 1999 "VAD"
- 2013 "Null"

DVD:

- 2015 "20x20 (20th Anniversary Music Videos)"

Tracks appear on:

- 1997 "Nigh – Chocolate XTC"
- 2001 "Electro-Organinc Vol.1 – Atlantis Is Kushti (Plaid mix)"
- 2001 "Rundfunk – Rhythmus Einer Stadt (Oliver Scotoni Und Alex Dallas) – Mark. B...B...B...Gun"
- 2008 "52 Weeks – This Is My Cancer"
- 2008 "Minicomp 3 – Alien Mermaid"
- 2011 "Carry On! – Dusty Tapes & Nuclear Raindrops"
