= Marcia Ashong =

Ghanaian entrepreneur

Marcia Ashong is a British-Ghanaian entrepreneur and lawyer recognized for her role in advocating for women's representation in boardrooms. She is the executive director of The Boardroom Africa (TBR Africa) and Brace Energy.

== Early life and education ==
Marcia was born in the United Kingdom to a Fante family. She attended the University of Minnesota and attained a Bachelor of Arts in International Relations & Political Science. She also studied at the University of Exeter and attained an LLB Hons. (Law) and at the University of Dundee, where she attained a Master of Laws (LLM) in Energy Law and Policy.

== Career ==
Marcia Ashong is the founder and executive director of The Boardroom Africa (TBR Africa) and Brace Energy.

In 2017, she was named in Ghana's 20 Top Under 40 business leaders. In 2010, she established the Ghana Oil Club (GOC), a body that enables petroleum and energy professionals to deliberate on Ghana's petroleum and energy sectors. In June 2020, Ashong was featured in the Visual Collaborative Polaris catalogue, under the Amplified series for humanities and innovation; she was interviewed alongside others from around the world.

== Achievements ==
- Human Rights Fellowship Winner.
