= Desdamona =

American rapper

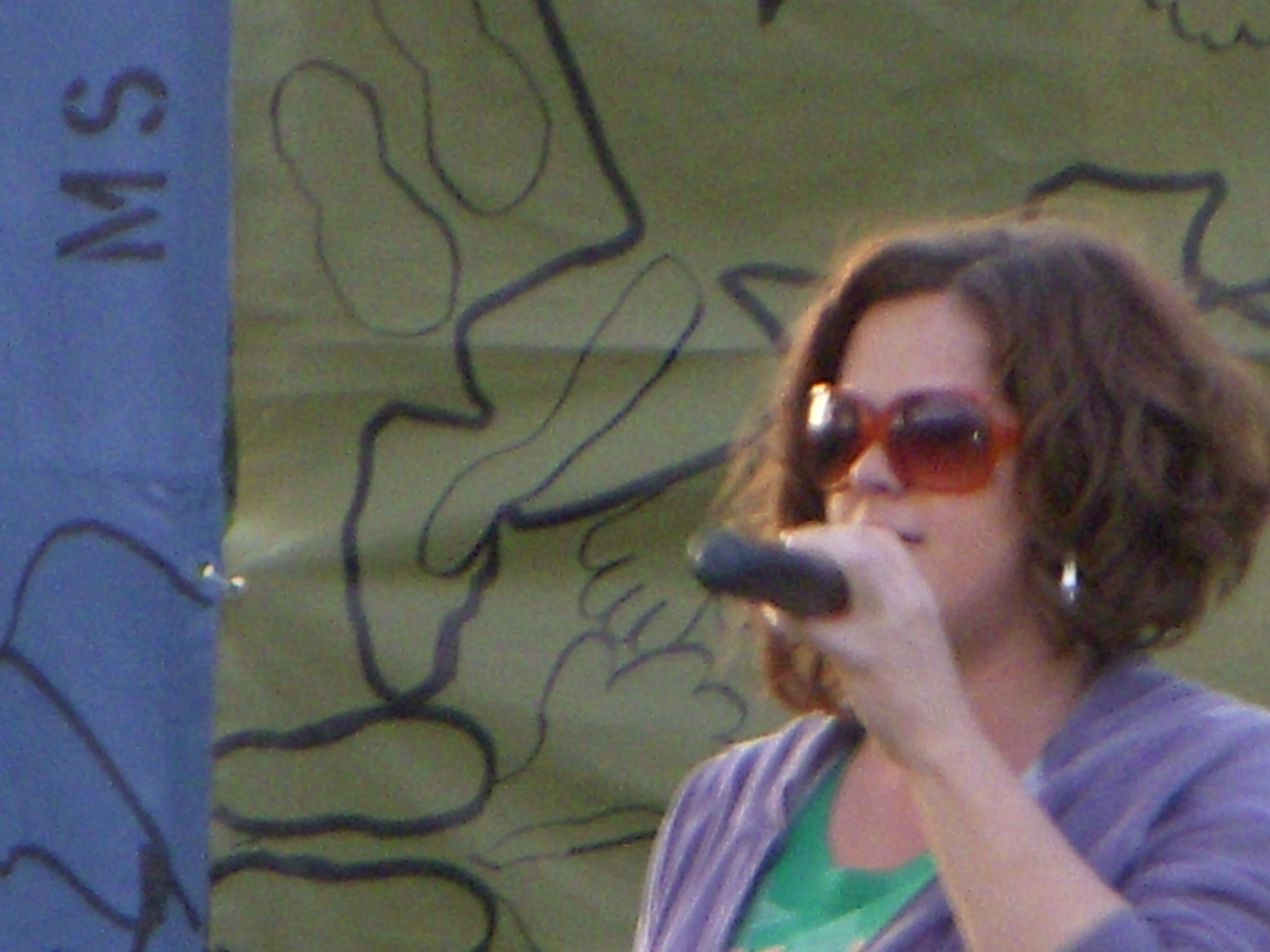
- Desdamona performing in Minneapolis, Minnesota.

Background information
- Born: 1973 (age 52–53); Mount Pleasant, Iowa, U.S.
- Origin: Minneapolis, Minnesota, U.S.
- Genres: Hip hop, spoken word
- Occupations: Rapper, poet, Teacher
- Years active: 1994–present

Desdamona is a hip-hop and spoken word artist from Minneapolis, Minnesota, United States. She has won five Minnesota Music Awards for 'Best Spoken Word Artist' in the years 2000, 2003, 2004, 2005, and 2006 (the awards were not hosted in 2001 and 2002). For that reason, and her strong standing in the male-dominated hip-hop scene, she is considered to be the best female spoken word and hip-hop artist in the Midwest.

== Background ==
Desdamona, her Emcee name, comes from Desdemona, the wife of Othello in William Shakespeare's tragedy Othello. She was born and went to school in Iowa. A childhood inspiration for her music, she said, was her father who would dress up as Count Dracula and tell bedtime stories to her and also her grandmother who was a poet and artist. In college, Desdamona and her friends formed a band in which Desdamona was the rapper, inspired by the R&B group TLC. The group performed around Waterloo, Iowa and had a few shows in Iowa City. When she moved to Minneapolis, she found an audience for her work. She began to go to open mic nights to perform her poetry. In this way, she became known as a spoken word artist, which was not her original intention, but which, she says, "made me a better writer."

== Career ==
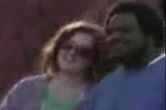
Ill Chemistry

Desdamona wrote and performed guest vocals on Brother Ali's Rites of Passage on the track titled "We Will Always B" in 2000. Her lines criticized male dominance of hip hop and chauvinism in general. Desdamona's first officialCD, The Ledge, came out on 5 June 2005 on the Zlink Entertainment Label. It included twelve songs. Prior to that she had independently released three projects (Alive @ First Ave, Resilence, A Prelude to the Real Thing. She frequently collaborates with Twin Cities beatboxer Carnage the Executioner, also known as Carnage. On Desdamona's second disc, The Source, which came out 26 June 2007, the duo do the first track, "Infinity", together. The two have formed a group called Ill Chemistry, which was noted as a rising hip hop group at the 2007 Minnesota Music Awards. Desdamona has noted that they're working on a collaboration on her blog.

Desdamona co-founded a female-based music festival, called B-Girl Be, which incorporates all the aspects of hip hop and spoken word; emceeing, break dance, DJing and graffiti. She also works with schools, teaching students, as well as in the Stillwater Prison program, In the Belly. In 2010, Desdamona was invited by Ursus Minor to collaborate on their third album. I will not take but for an answer, now been touring with Ursus Minor along with Boots Riley and ill chemistry since 2010. She is working on a new solo project titled "No Man's Land" that is a CD-book project and she is also collaborating with a French recording artist for a project in 2015.

In September 2019, Desdamona appeared in the Visual Collaborative electronic catalogue, in an issue themed Vivencias which translates to "Experiences" in Spanish. She was interviewed alongside 30 people from around the world that included Kelli Ali, Dakore Akande and Adelaide Damoah.
