= Yumiko Kayukawa =

Japanese visual artist

- Born: 1970 (age 55–56)
- Known for: contemporary art, painting
- Style: figuration
- Website: www.yumikokayukawa.com

Yumiko Kayukawa (born 1970) is a Japanese visual artist, currently based in Seattle, known for fantastical paintings that utilize flat color and decorative graphic elements in works that combine female figures with animals, mythical beings and natural elements.

== Early life and education ==
Yumiko Kayukawa was born in the town of Naie on the island of Hokkaido, Japan. Kayukawa attended Bisen Art School in Sapporo. She moved to Seattle, Washington in 2005.

== Work ==
Kayukawa's work combines traditional Japanese themes with motifs from American fashion and music culture. Shinto animism combines with Rock and Roll inspirations.

== Selected exhibitions ==
Kayukawa's solo exhibitions include Year Of The Fire Horse at Foley Gallery, New York, NY in 2014, “HAKURYUU – White Dragon” at LeBasse projects, Culver City, CA in 2012,
