= Rocking Horse (album) =

Studio album by Kelli Ali
- Released: 24 November 2008
- Recorded: Glasgow Pencaitland
- Genres: Folk, psychedelic folk, dream pop
- Label: One Little Indian
- Producer: Max Richter

Kelli Ali chronology
Psychic Cat (2004)	Rocking Horse (2008)

Professional ratings
Review scores
Source	Rating
Guardian	link
The Independent	link
Sunday Times	link
Spiral Earth	link
Terrascope	link

Rocking Horse is the third solo album from singer-songwriter Kelli Ali and was released through One Little Indian Records on 24 November 2008 in the United Kingdom.

The album was produced by Max Richter, producer of Vashti Bunyan's album, Lookaftering, composer of The Blue Notebooks and winner of the European Film Academy Award for his score on Waltz with Bashir.

The album has been compared to Goldfrapp's album Seventh Tree.

The album's cover artwork is by Steven Wilson.

== Track listing ==
1. "Dancing Bears" – 3:26
2. "One Day at a Time" – 5:01
3. "The Savages" – 3:23
4. "Heavens Door" – 5:04
5. "Urique" – 4:56
6. "Rocking Horse" – 3:21
7. "September Sky" – 5:32
8. "A Storm in a Teacup" – 5:01
9. "The Kiss" – 4:51
10. "Flowers" – 6:13
11. "Water Under the Bridge" – 3:16
12. "What to Do" – 3:36
13. "The Kiss Epilogue" – 1:44

== Credits ==
- Kelli Ali – vocals, lyrics
- Max Richter – Piano, Hammond organ & Rhodes
- Marc Pilley – Acoustic & Electric guitars & Banjo
- Katherine Macintosh – Cor Anglais & Oboe
- Ruth Morley – Flute
- Simon Cottrell – Bass
- Simon Rawson – Viola
- Helen Duncan – Cello
- Uli Fenner – 1st Violin
- Sharleen Clapperton – Violin
