= Aya Chebbi =

Tunisian diplomat (born 1988)

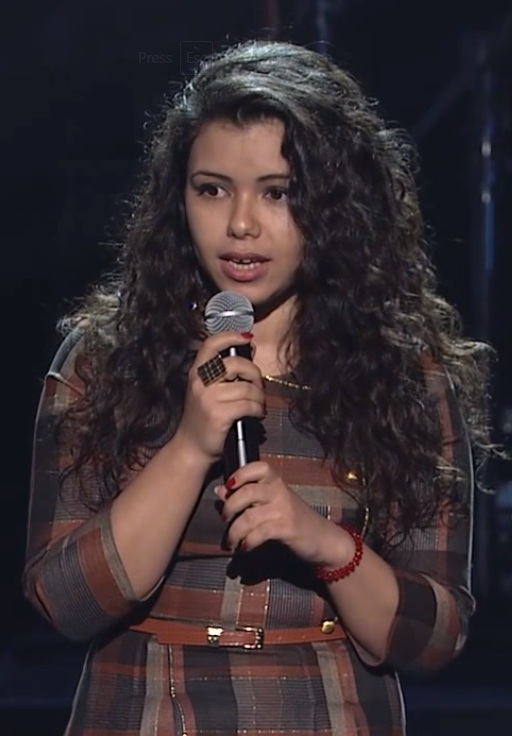
- Aya Chebbi Speech at the 2015 United Nations UN Women

African Union (AU) Special Envoy for Youth
- In office November 2018 – November 2021
- President: Moussa Faki
- Succeeded by: Chido Cleopatra Mpemba

Personal details
- Born: Aya Chebbi; 1988 (age 37–38) Dahmani
- Occupation: Activist; diplomat; speaker
- Known for: Activist, Human rights, Pan-African feminist
- Awards: 2019 Gates Foundation Campaigner Award; (Full list)
- Website: ayachebbi.com

Aya Chebbi (Arabic: آية الشابي, romanized: Aya al-Chebbi; born 1988), is a Tunisian diplomat, and a pan-African and feminist activist. She became the first appointed African Union Envoy on Youth in November 2018. Appointed by the chairperson of the African Union Commission, Moussa Faki, in November 2018, as the youngest senior official in the history of the African Union, and youngest diplomat in the chairperson's cabinet.

== Early life and education ==
Aya Chebbi was born in 1988 in Dahmani, Tunisia, a small village in northwest Tunisia on the border with Algeria. She spent part of her childhood moving across different Tunisian cities, as her father had a military career, which exposed her early to diverse social and cultural environments throughout the country.

Chebbi was raised in a Tunisian family in which her father emphasized the values of determination and gender equality. She developed an early interest in activism, later recalling that she staged informal "hunger strikes" at home as a child to express her views.

Chebbi completed her primary and secondary education in the local public school system before enrolling at the University of Tunis El Manar, where she earned a Bachelor’s degree in International Relations.

At the School of Oriental and African Studies (SOAS), University of London, Chebbi pursued postgraduate education and earned a Master’s degree in African Politics (with distinction) under a Mo Ibrahim Foundation scholarship. Her research focused on the state-youth relationship, linked to their subscription to Jihadism, with a dissertation titled "Youth Radicalization, a comparative Study of Tunisia-Kenya". During this time, she also held a Fulbright scholarship at Georgia Southern University.

During her university years, Chebbi began using blogging as a tool for activism, creating her personal blog Proudly Tunisian in 2010, just before the Tunisian Revolution.

== Digital activism and Pan-African advocacy ==
Chebbi was one of the first female bloggers of the Arab Spring, using her personal blog, Proudly Tunisian, beginning in 2010 to advocate for democracy, women's rights, and civic engagement among Tunisian youth. Her writing focused on democratic participation, gender equality, and civic responsibility, earning her international recognition during the Tunisian Revolution. She began focusing on digital activism and youth-led social change across Africa, she expanded her work beyond blogging by co-founding initiatives such as the Voice of Women Initiative (VOW-I), and the Afrika Youth Movement (AYM), both of which employ digital platforms to train young leaders, document grassroots efforts, and amplify underrepresented voices.

== Advocacy for peacebuilding and anti-violence campaigns ==
As African Union Special Envoy on Youth and a UN Global Champion, Chebbi has actively promoted peacebuilding and violence prevention across Africa. She played a leading role in the AU’s “Silencing the Guns initiative, working to reduce armed conflict and foster sustainable peace on the continent by 2020. Chebbi organized youth-led peace forums in more than 30 African countries, bringing together young leaders to discuss strategies for nonviolence, civic engagement, and community reconciliation.

== Career ==
Chebbi came to prominence and international attention as a blogger during the 2010 Tunisian Revolution. She is referred to as a Pan-African Feminist and a well-known blogger.

Her blogs were published on OpenDemocracy and Al-Jazeera, among numerous media outlets. She subsequently traveled across the African continent to support and train thousands of social movement leaders and activists on mobilization, blogging, leadership, and non-violence as a scholar, mentor, speaker, and activist.

In March 2015, Chebbi was invited as the Youth Speaker for UN Women's celebratory event for the 20th anniversary of the Fourth World Conference on Women in Beijing. The same year, she founded the Afrika Youth Movement (AYM), which has since become one of Africa's largest youth-led networks, connecting over 10,000 young activists across 40 countries in promoting peace, sustainable development, and social justice.

Chebbi was appointed as an emissary of Tunisian youth at the 32nd summit of the African Union in Addis Ababa.

In November 2018, Chebbi was appointed the first African Union Special Envoy on Youth by the Chairperson of the African Union Commission, Moussa Faki Mahamat. Chebbi started her mission by launching the 2019/2020 Action Plan outlining four Models of Action; (1) Innovation, (2) Advocacy, (3) Intergenerational & Policy, and (4) Communication.

In June 2019, Chebbi was featured in the Visual Collaborative Polaris catalogue, under the Voyager series for humanities.

Since 2020, Chebbi has been serving as a member of the Independent Panel for Pandemic Preparedness and Response (IPPR), an independent group examining the way the World Health Organization (WHO) and countries handled the COVID-19 pandemic, co-chaired by Helen Clark and Ellen Johnson Sirleaf. She was also featured in Forbes Africa's "Africa's 50 Most Powerful Women".

== Awards and recognition ==
- 2024 – Received the Vital Voices Global Leadership Award, honored by Vital Voices at their global leadership event at the Kennedy Center in Washington, D.C
- 2024 – Appointed as UN Global Champion on Conflict‑Related Sexual Violence & Youth Liaison.2022 – Finalist, “Changemaker” category at the UN SDG Action Awards
- 2019 – Bill & Melinda Gates Foundation Campaigner Award
- 2019 – MIPAD 100, a list of the Most Influential People of African Descent
- 2019 – Ten Young African Changemakers by YouthhubAfrica
- 2018 – Young Talent Of The Year By UNLEASH
- 2017 – UNAOC fellowship, awarded by the United Nations Alliance of Civilizations (UNAOC)
- 2016 – Huffington Post’s List of Inspiring Young Women from Around the World
- 2016 – List of Formidable Women Leading Change
- 2016 – Member of the Crans Montana Forum of New Leaders for Tomorrow
- 2016 – Arabian Business list of 100 under 40 Most Influential Arabs in the world
- 2015 – Mo Ibrahim Foundation Scholarship Award
- 2012 – Fulbright Scholarship Award
- 2011 – MENA Democracy Fellowship, awarded by the World Affairs Institute (WAI)

== See also ==
- Moussa Faki
- Chido Cleopatra Mpemba
- Bogolo Kenewendo
