= Ballet Minnesota =

American ballet company

Ballet Minnesota is a classical dance company in Minnesota, United States. Established in 1990, the company has now worked for over 30 years to present ballet to the Minneapolis-St. Paul area. Founded by Andrew and Cheryl Rist, its stated mission is to be "dedicated to creating and sharing artistry in dance through public presentations and education."

Ballet Minnesota works with its sister organization, Classical Ballet Academy, in the Upper Midwest.

== Repertoire ==
- The Classic Nutcracker: First performed in 1987 before the official founding of Ballet Minnesota, The Classic Nutcracker has become a tradition for countless families in the Twin Cities area. The classic ballet is presented to over 10,000 audience members each holiday season.
