= President Records =

British record label

- Parent company: President Records Inc.
- Founded: 1957
- Founder: Edward Kassner
- Genre: Various
- Country of origin: England
- Location: Units 6 & 7, 11 Wyfold Road, Fulham, London SW6 6SE
- Official website: president-records.co.uk

President Records is a British independent record label. It is one of the oldest independent record companies in the UK, originally launched in 1957 by Edward Kassner. During the 1960s and 1970s the label, and its subsidiary Jay Boy, had hits with artists including the Equals, George McCrae and KC & the Sunshine Band, Paintbox, and later focused on releasing back-catalogue compilations as well as occasional new albums by artists such as Robots In Disguise. President Records remains part of the Kassner Music Group.

== Beginnings ==
President Records Inc, with which song publisher Edward Kassner became involved through one of his publishing contacts, was a record label founded on 6 June 1955 in the midst of the burgeoning independent music scene in New York. A corresponding British company was established by Kassner in May 1957, when he acquired the full company, initially to license some of the productions made in the name of the US company to major UK record labels such as Decca.

Kassner launched his own Seville Records label in the US with the idea of publishing a song and recording it, thus keeping control of the record's destiny by releasing on an owned label. Seville Records scored hits in 1961 with "Shout! Shout! (Knock Yourself Out)", a song written and performed by Ernie Maresca, and in 1962 with "Bobby's Girl", written by two college students (Hank Hoffman and Gary Klein), a chart success for Marcie Blane in the US. After his initial success with Seville Records, Kassner revitalised the President label. The US release schedule followed with a series of rock'n'roll acts, notably Charlie Gracie and the Jodimars (formerly Bill Haley’s backing group, the publishing arm of Kassner Music having earlier bought rights to the song "Rock Around The Clock").

== UK launch ==
Encouraged by the success of Kassner Music’s publishing business with the signing of Ray Davies of the Kinks, the UK label, President Records Ltd., was launched in the summer of 1966 to pick up on the developing trend in the music business of popular groups and singers who wrote their own material, centring on the scene in London at the time. Early highlights of the UK label included harmony group the Symbols, who broke through with covers of "Bye Bye Baby" and "The Best Part of Breaking Up", and Felice Taylor, whose top 20 UK chart hit "I Feel Love Comin On", licensed in from US label Mustang Records, represented a first success for songwriter and arranger Barry White.

The label’s first number 1 came in 1968, as British mixed-race band the Equals hit with "Baby, Come Back", written by the teenage leader of the band, Eddy Grant. The song was originally a single B-side to "Hold Me Closer"; a radio DJ in Germany flipped the single and it took off. The Equals scored two more top ten hits on President with "Viva Bobby Joe" and "Black Skin Blue Eyed Boys".

President was also successful with a series of top 30 hits by Welsh vocalist Dorothy Squires, who charted with "For Once in My Life", "Till" and "My Way". In addition many psychedelic pop records released by President in the late 1960s have become collectable, notably Hat and Tie's "Finding It Rough", and Rhubarb Rhubarb's "Rainmaker"; latter day mod/sixties club favourites such as Watson T. Browne & the Explosive's "I Close My Eyes", and Lloyd Alexander Real Estate Band's "Whatcha Gonna Do", featuring future members of the progressive rock band Audience; and "Pawnbroker Pawnbroker" by the songwriter turned performer Barbara Ruskin. Ruskin had a number of singles released on President. Besides "Pawnbroker, Pawnbroker" she had "Gentlemen, Please", "Hail Love!", "A Little Of This (And A Little Of That)" and "Beautiful Friendship" etc. released on the label. One of her earlier songs "Just a Little While Longer" was included on the 1967 debut album for The Foundations. Paintbox also recorded for the label making two singles, "Come On Round" written by Harry Vanda and George Young, from the band The Easybeats, and a second entitled "Let Your Love Go", written by David Gates of the American band 'Bread'.

== Jay Boy ==
Identifying the burgeoning nightclub scene in Britain that began in the late 1960s and gathered momentum in the early 1970s, Kassner set up a subsidiary label, Jay Boy, specifically to cater for the market for R&B and classic soul music (later termed "Northern soul"). Already well established in the practice of bringing American songs to Europe, Kassner followed a similar pattern for his record label by licensing recordings from the United States. Doris Duke launched the JayBoy label under the name Doris Willingham with "You Can’t Do That" in 1968. The label imprint subsequently became a respected player on the Northern Soul scene with UK releases of records such as Bob & Earl's "My Little Girl", Ray Merrell's "Tears Of Joy" and Donald Height's "Three Hundred And Sixty-Five Days". UK productions were added to Jayboy and the label was simultaneously launched in the US via Marvin Holtzman who had earlier produced "Bobby's Girl" by Marcie Blane for Ed Kassner's Seville label.

Seeking to find more of this type of music, Kassner met with his former distributor from the Seville Records days, TK Records owner Henry Stone, based in Florida. Henry’s big artists, Timmy Thomas and Betty Wright, were signed to a major label but the major had passed on his other acts. Kassner did a deal for the rejects, and these included the husband and wife team George and Gwen McCrae. Within a few months "Rock Your Baby" by George McCrae went to number 1 in the UK in July 1974, with a further six chart hits following over the next two years. Kassner followed up with another Miami club act introduced by Stone, KC and the Sunshine Band, whose single "Queen Of Clubs" reached the top ten in the UK in August 1974. A string of KC hits on Jayboy followed, including "Get Down Tonight", "That's the Way (I Like It)" and "(Shake, Shake, Shake) Shake Your Booty". The label had successfully crossed over from the clubs to the mainstream as with just these two acts alone President commanded 5% of the UK singles market at the time, on a par with the major MCA Records.

== Other labels ==
=== Crystal ===
Crystal Records was a subsidiary of President Records. It was launched on Friday 13 June 1969. As mentioned by Record Retailer in the 11 June issue, the single was Kilimanjaro by Trinidadian singer, Jon Sands who was connected to Premonition Music. Backed with "Lil' Oh Me" and released on Crystal CR 7001, this was the first release for the fledgling label. The song would be a hit in the UK and in Africa. It was written in the 11 June 1969 edition of Record Retailer that the Crystal label would serve as an outlet for music producer Jack Price. Also in 1969, two songs, "Without Your Love" and "So Many Times" that jack Price produced for Jimmy Cassidy were released on the single Crystal CR 7003. Cassidy would later work with producer Pete Swettenham and record for the Decca label.

Craig Douglas recorded the song "All Kinds of People". Backed with "Evenin' Rain", it was released on CR 7011 in 1971.

In 1973, Matata's single, "Wanna Do My Thing" bw "Wild River" had their single released in France on Crystal 43000.

=== Aquarius ===
The 24 April 1976 issue of Music Week wrote that President was handling the Aquarius label. Aquarius belonged to the J.A.C.K.S. group of companies which were French. The first release for the label in the UK was "You Got It" on Aquarius AQ 3 by Judd & Miss Munro, the husband-and-wife team of Judd Hamilton and Caroline Munro. Prior to that was "Cumba Cumba" by The Monstars on Aquarius AQ 2.

=== Riverdale ===
Riverdale records was founded by Barry Class in 1976. President also marketed releases by the label. Some of the releases include " Sweet Happiness" bw "Lady Luck" by Clem Curtis & The Foundations, "Friday Night (Pay Day!)" bw "Pay Day! (Friday Night)" by Pittons Party, "Whichaway Billy" bw "Hobbit Land" by The Settlers, "Want You to Make It a Home" bw "Girl in the Room" by Mowrey Jnr. & Watson, "Little Star" bw "Never Give Up" by Rocking Horse, "Your Momma & Poppa" bw "Gypsys, Tramps & Thieves" by Many Ann, and the Split Personality album by Jimmy Jones.

=== Hawk Records ===
Hawk Records was run by Raymond Morrison. Artists that recorded for the label included Ram & Tam, Owen Gray, Count Prince Miller, Tam (Tamara Edwards) and Roy Shirley. Their records were both manufactured and distributed by President Records.

== Restructure and present day ==
Such success brought with it significant pressures to maintain the new business level. Without the resources of a major record company, however, President restructured in the late 1970s and early 1980s, ceasing to release new recordings, and concentrated on marketing back catalogue, reissues and compilations.

The label increased its activities again in 1984, when a chance meeting between Edward Kassner’s son, David, who had joined the business in 1972, and American producer Tommy Boyce heralded the next term for President. Boyce’s idea was to start a label with its own studio and an all-star line up of established rock artists. The first album on the subsidiary label TBG/President was Silent Nights from ex-Yes keyboard player Rick Wakeman in 1984 (recorded at Herne Place in Sunningdale, the studio owned by Eddie Hardin, also signed to the label), followed by Live at Hammersmith in 1985. Although Boyce left the project early on, President continued with it and Wakeman went on to make 30 albums for the company. President Records also oversaw the first record releases by his sons, Adam and Oliver.

During the late 1980s President did good business with the albums made by Ray Fenwick as Forcefield, featuring, by turns, vocals from Pete Prescott, Tony Martin (Black Sabbath) and Graham Bonnet (Rainbow). Over the course of the 1990s releases of new recordings through President again became infrequent. Nonetheless an ear and an eye for opportunities always remained open. As recently as April 2010, President achieved indie singles chart success with the track "Wake Up!" recorded by electro-punk band, Robots in Disguise, which followed three successful albums with the group, Disguises, Get RID! and We're In The Music Biz. The band and the label came together after Coca-Cola specifically requested the use of the band’s version of the Kassner-published, Ray Davies-penned song "You Really Got Me" for an advertising campaign.

President Records continued to diversify into various music markets with the acquisition in 1991 of the Dansan Records catalogue, set up by Tommy Sanderson in the late 1970s and renowned for having produced some of the best recordings ever made for ballroom dancing. Sanderson had a role there of producer and A&R man as well. He had also led his own group at one stage, Tommy Sanderson & The Sandmen. Recordings by Andy Ross & His Orchestra, Bryan Smith & the Dixieland Seven and the Eric Winstone Orchestra (amongst others) are still popular sellers.

President Records is part of the Kassner Music Group, controlling in excess of eight thousand masters which touch upon virtually every genre of music. Exploitation of these masters is now the core of the company’s business. Recent placements of President masters have included Millie Foster "Love Wheel" on ABC TV show Pan-Am and in an online advertisement for shoe manufacturer Stuart Weitzman, and Yellow Taxi "Anna Laura Lee" in independent French film release Comment j'ai détesté les maths.

David Kassner is now Managing Director of President Records. Veronique (Marie Letizia) Kassner is Finance Manager, and Alex Kassner (Edward's grandson) is Business Affairs/International.
