= IAMX =

Chris Corner solo musical project

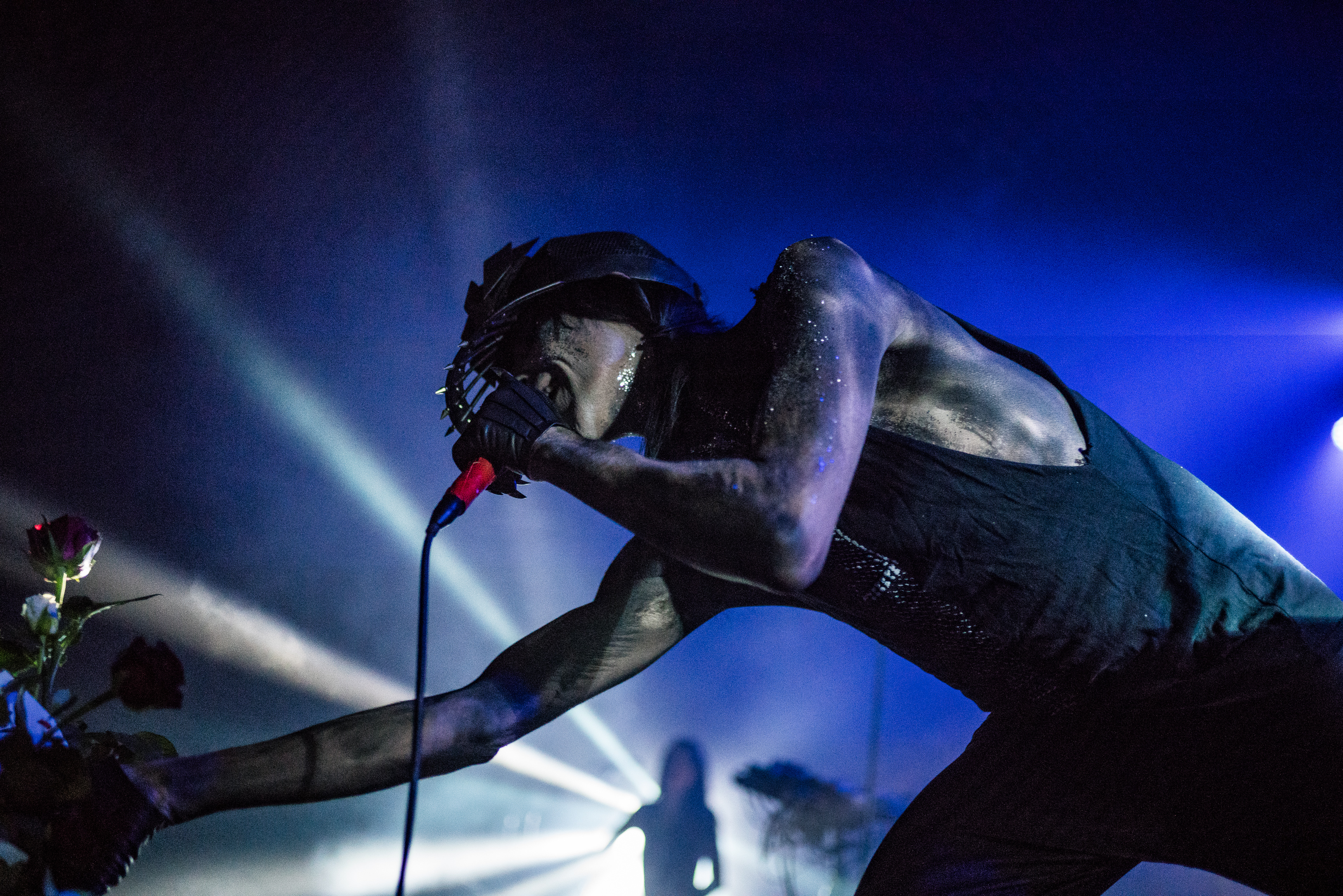
- IAMX during the concert in Warsaw promoting the album "Alive In New Light", 2018

Background information
- Origin: London, England
- Genres: Synthpop; dark cabaret; industrial; electronic; experimental
- Years active: 2002–present
- Labels: Major Records, 61seconds, Fiction/NoCarbon/Genepool, Metropolis, Orphic, Caroline Distribution, Unfall Productions
- Members: Chris Corner; Jon Siren; Gözde Düzer
- Website: IAMXmusic.com

IAMX is the solo musical project of Chris Corner founded in 2002 in London, England after the hiatus of his former band Sneaker Pimps. It is an independent music project with a secondary focus on the experimentation of visual art.

== Chris Corner ==
IAMX spans across multiple genres, including electronic rock, dance music, burlesque-influenced dark cabaret, and emotional ballads sung with Corner's wide-range voice.

IAMX has released ten studio albums, two remix albums, one experimental album, two live albums, and one acoustic rework album. Most were released independently, being written and produced solely by Corner, with the exceptions of the fifth studio album The Unified Field and the experimental album Unfall, which were co-produced by Jim Abbiss, and the acoustic album Echo Echo, which was co-produced by David Bottrill. As of April 2025, the most recent IAMX albums are Fault Lines¹ and Fault Lines², released in 2023 and 2024 respectively.

From 2006 to 2014, IAMX was based in Berlin, Germany where Corner said he found "the spirit to care less about the music industry and take an independent route." He attributes a large influence on IAMX's lyrics and sound to Berlin, which inspired lyrical subjects such as death, love, addiction, narcotic intoxication, and decadence, as well as critiques of religion, modern society, politics, alienation, and the exploration of sexual identity and gender expression. The theme of gender identity is further emphasized by Corner's androgynous image both on and off stage.

During this time, IAMX developed a reputation for highly energetic and theatrical live performances, with unusual stage outfits and body painting becoming core elements of their shows. Their stage designs consist of art and props made by Corner and his live band members, used alongside live projections.

The official IAMX music videos also began to be directed, filmed, and edited by Corner. On directing his own music videos, Corner said, "I adore video. There's so much scope that music and visual together can achieve. I've always painted with sound and had strong images in my head when I made music, so moving into video was natural." Both their live projections and music videos have contained controversial and often explicit content. This explicit content is sometimes hidden, both as Easter eggs for fans to discover and to bypass censorship from various social media platforms.

In 2014, due to his chronic insomnia and depression, Corner moved IAMX from Berlin to California, stating: "I needed a big change of scenery. I had a few friends in Los Angeles and it seemed like the most relevant place for me, so I got on a boat and sailed over to the States." He currently lives and works at Silent Valley Studios in Southern California.

== History ==
IAMX was founded by Corner in 2002 in London, England. The name 'I am X' refers to Becoming X, the title of the Sneaker Pimps debut album. Corner explained that by founding IAMX, he no longer felt that he was becoming X, but rather that he was X, with the meaning of the X ever changing. "X represents the subconscious. It is Art, Sex, Truth. It is radical openness that we achieve in heightened states of creativity. It is the unquantifiable element in all pleasure and all pain. IAMX as a project is an alter ego; a second personality that I can play with and nurture."

Additionally, throughout the project's aesthetics, the X in IAMX can be periodically seen placed within brackets (e.g. {X}), like the unknown variable in a mathematical equation. This is a reference to the works of the French philosopher Gilles Deleuze.

=== Kiss + Swallow (2004–2006) ===
IAMX's debut album, Kiss + Swallow, was released in 2004 and consisted of melancholic, dark, 1980s-influenced electro music with lyrical content often referring to the psychology of sexual fantasy and role play, gender bending, the exploration of solitude, aggression, longing, codependency and mortality. It was written, performed and produced by Corner himself. Kiss + Swallow was recorded in Corner's home studio in London called The Den.

Many of the songs were initially written by Corner for a fourth Sneaker Pimps album, but while the band was working on the album, it soon became clear that the songs did not suit the direction of Sneaker Pimps. However, the songs remained important to Corner, so he decided to keep working on them as a separate project.

After the release of Kiss + Swallow, Corner went on tour with IAMX, playing sporadically throughout Europe and the US. The live line-up varied between a revolving cast of close friends including Sue Denim of Robots in Disguise (whose vocals are also featured on the album), Noel Fielding and Julian Barratt of The Mighty Boosh, James Cook of Nemo, Mary Ambrose, and the actress Julia Davis of Nighty Night.

Kiss + Swallow was released in the US on 17 June 2008. The US album included the previously unreleased track "I-Polaroids" and a remix of the title song by Moonbootica, and used a variant cover for the album artwork.

Between tours in 2005, Corner wrote and produced the soundtrack for the film Les Chevaliers du Ciel and produced the second Robots in Disguise album, Get RID!.

=== The Alternative and Live in Warsaw (2006–2008) ===
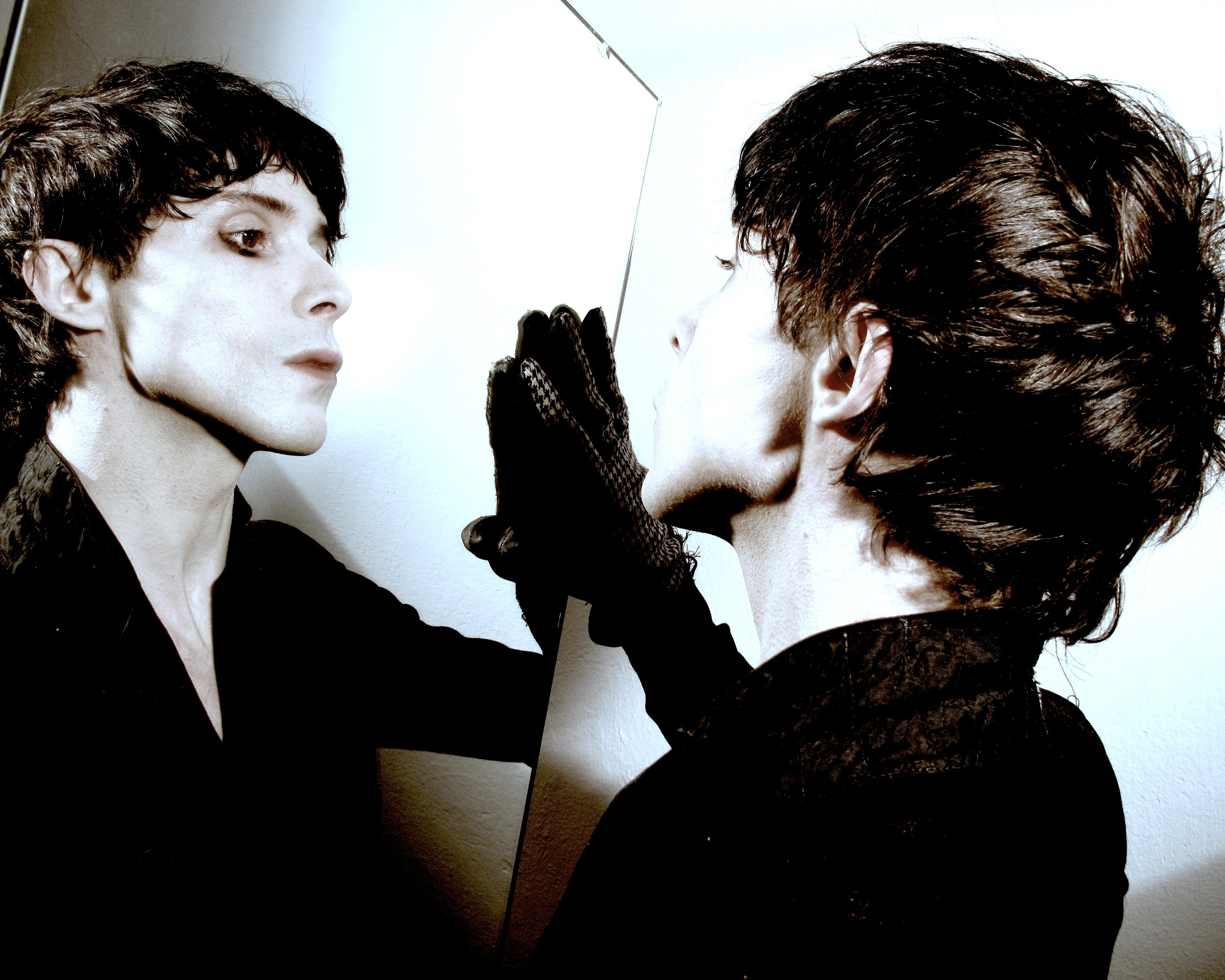
Chris Corner photographed by live keyboardist Janine Gezang in 2009

IAMX's second album, The Alternative, had its first physical release in April 2006 in Europe, and its European and UK digital release October 2007. In November 2007, it was released physically in the UK and Ireland; then in May 2008, it was released on Metropolis Records in the US. The European and US versions had variant covers, with the US version featuring black tape over the face on the cover, rather than the original yellow tape. European and US versions also featured alternate versions of several tracks such as a hidden instrumental string version of "Spit It Out", which was arranged and recorded by Audrey Morse, added production, and new backing vocals from Janine Gezang, who had recently joined the live line-up as backing vocalist, bassist, and keyboardist.

Janine Gezang's addition to the live lineup was announced in the summer of 2006, alongside the news that Dean Rosenzweig would be on guitars and bass, and Tom Marsh on drums. However, Corner began playing shows in support of The Alternative in April 2006, the same month of its European release, playing various festivals across Europe before embarking on a full-fledged Europe and US tour with the live lineup mentioned above in tow.

A limited-edition live album, Live in Warsaw, was released on 14 November 2008 on IAMX's own label, 61seconds. The performance was recorded in front of a live audience for the Polskie Radio Program III and later mixed by Corner in Berlin at IAMX2 studios. At the time, the album was exclusively available on the band's online shop, Boutique IAMX and was not made available for many years after it initially sold out. However, it has since been made available again for digital download and streaming via Corner's new label UNFALL Productions.

=== Kingdom of Welcome Addiction and Dogmatic Infidel Comedown OK (2009–2010) ===
The third IAMX album, Kingdom of Welcome Addiction, was released on 19 May 2009. The album's release was preceded by the single "Think of England", which was made available for free download on 7 November 2008. This album had a heavier sound than the previous two albums, and utilized Gezang's soprano harmonization throughout. It also featured guest vocals by Imogen Heap on the track "My Secret Friend" with Corner directing the corresponding music video.

In early 2010, it was announced that Janine Gezang would remain on keyboards/synths, vocals and bass; while Rosenzweig and Marsh would be replaced by Alberto Álvarez on guitars, vocals, drums and bass, and Jon Harper on drums. However, before the second half of the tour, in August 2010, Harper was replaced by MAX, a drum machine which was programmed and triggered by Corner.

When asked in an interview, "Where and what is the Kingdom of Welcome Addiction for IAMX?" Corner responded, "In a cold suburb of my sensual and beloved Berlin. In the womb of IAMX. A place where the aches and pains of banality can be relieved. Vices, insecurities, stupidities cured. A little bit like Disney world but with lipstick, cynicism and wit."

A remixed and reworked version of the album entitled Dogmatic Infidel Comedown OK was released on 19 March 2010. The release featured reworks done by Corner himself under the alias of UNFALL, as well as remixes and covers by other artists, including Alec Empire, Terence Fixmer, Combichrist, Aesthetic Perfection and more. The artists featured on the album were all selected and asked to contribute by IAMX. The title of the remixed album is an anagram of the original album's title Kingdom of Welcome Addiction.

=== Volatile Times and The Unified Field (2011–2014) ===
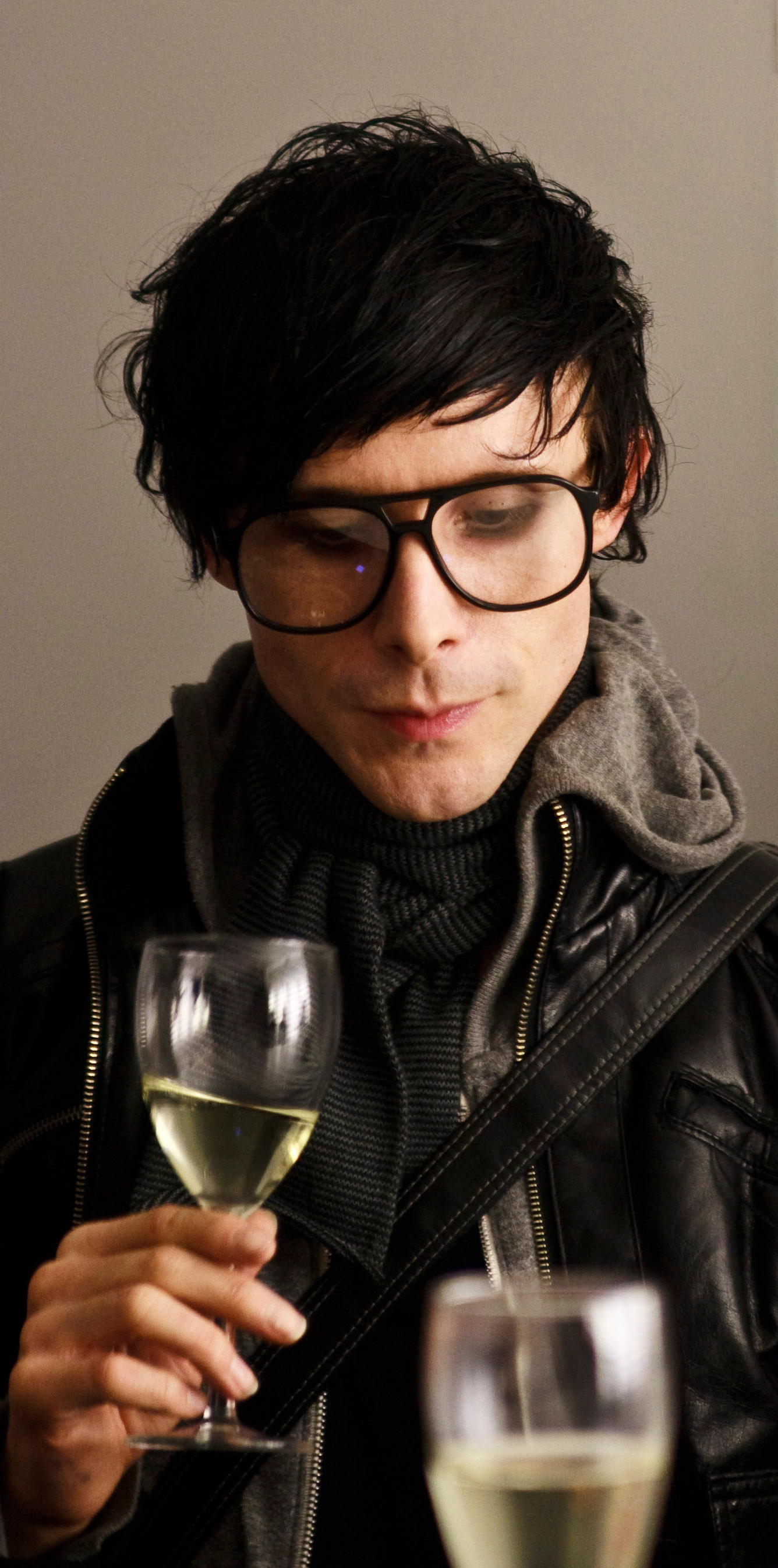
Chris Corner at an IAMX autograph session in Munich

In April 2010, Corner teased that he was working on his fourth studio album, which he referred to as IAMX4. On 19 October 2010, it was announced that IAMX4 was now identified as Volatile Times. In early March 2011, the week before the album's release, the track "Fire and Whispers" was made available for free download on the IAMX website. The album was then released in Europe on 18 March 2011 where it peaked at #68 in the German Media Control Charts.

Corner has repeatedly stated that creating Volatile Times was difficult emotionally. He described the album as his most self-indulgent and the peak of his inner struggle with working alone.

IAMX went on two European tours throughout 2011: the 'Fire And Whispers Tour' in the first half of the year and the 'Into Asylum Tour' in the second half. Caroline Weber joined the live line-up on drums in 2011, alongside Álvarez on guitars, backing vocals, drums and bass, and Gezang on keyboards/synths, backing vocals and bass.

On 1 February 2012, it was announced on IAMX's social media that work had officially begun on the fifth studio album, which had the then working title of IAMX5. On 13 May 2012, Corner announced that there would be a vlog posted on the official IAMX YouTube channel every two weeks, which would allow fans to view the recording process of the new album. In the third vlog, Corner revealed that IAMX5 was to be co-produced by Jim Abbiss. Abbiss had formerly worked alongside Corner to co-produce Sneaker Pimps' debut album, Becoming X, and had gone on to produce albums for artists such as Adele and Arctic Monkeys.

On 6 July 2012, via his online blog, Corner revealed the name of a track, "Come Home", from the forthcoming album. On 1 October 2012, a fundraising project was launched via the PledgeMusic website, which would allow fans to bid on items such as old tour set lists, drumsticks, signed CDs, and to pre-order the new album with the additional goal of funding a "Making Of" documentary for the album. Essentially, the more that was pledged, the more IAMX would be able to do, and the more cities they would be able to reach on the accompanying tour. The goal of this fundraiser reached its 100% target in one hour, and eventually reached 817% of the set target.

On 19 October 2012, it was announced that the album would officially be named The Unified Field and would be preceded by the title track as the first single alongside the track "Quiet The Mind". Both songs were released on 3 December 2012. The album was released on 20 March 2013 for fans who pledged on the PledgeMusic project, and 22 March 2013 to the general public.

Following the album's release, IAMX began the 'Animal Impulses Tour', adding new live members Richard Ankers on drums and Sammi Doll on keyboards and backing vocals. Janine Gezang also returned on keyboards/synths, vocals and bass. The 'Animal Impulses Tour' began in Europe and ended in North America. This was the first tour which visited the US after a four-year gap, a feat only made possible through the PledgeMusic campaign.

A second tour in support of the album was announced, but on 16 August 2013, the IAMX management team posted a statement regarding the rescheduling of the 2013 Fall 'Screams Tour' until 2014, as Corner had been diagnosed with chronic primary insomnia and was seeking treatment. Due to ongoing health complications, the 'Screams Tour' was eventually cancelled.

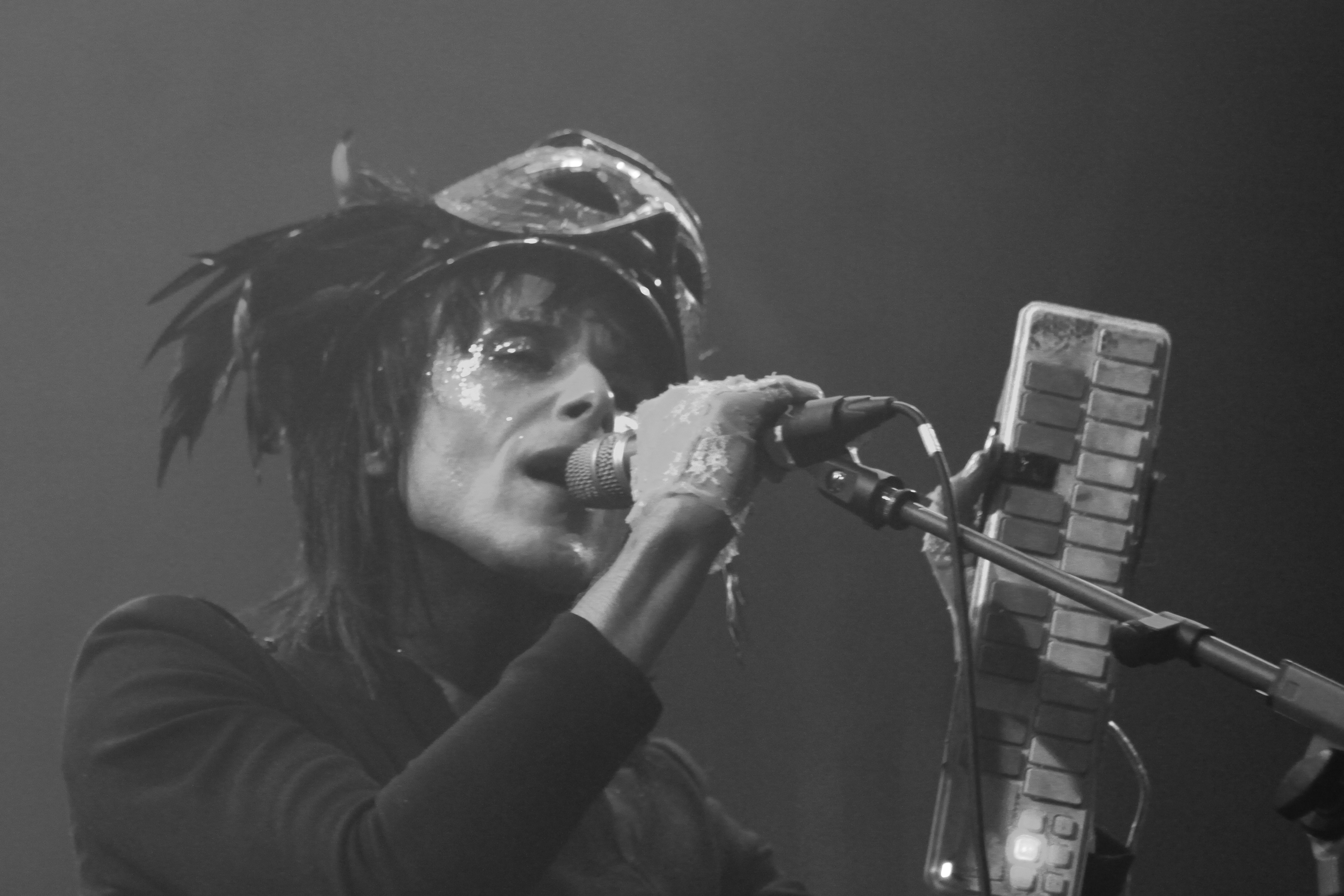
IAMX at WGT 2013

The project went dark, with Corner later stating, "In the worst period, I didn't go online; I didn't connect. I became a recluse. [...] I had stopped creating music because I felt like music was my enemy and that it was hurting me psychologically and emotionally: it was too much to deal with." He found solace through the compassion of his fans after posting 'Insomnia Schizophonica'; a blog post in which he detailed the mental health ordeal he had faced. "When I started to recover, I decided to talk about it and I wrote in an online blog about my experiences and it became very clear to me that there was so much support from the fans. So many people could relate to those issues that it gave me so much confidence to go forward and to continue being creative."

On 2 September 2013, an entirely reworked version of Volatile Times was digitally released for the United States and Canada. The release included three bonus tracks: "Avalanches", "Volatile Times (IAMseX Unfall Rework)" and "Bernadette (Post Romanian Storm)".

On 31 May 2014, Corner played a live online acoustic set of songs from Kiss + Swallow which was broadcast worldwide. He hinted at a new album during a Q&A session on 17 August 2014, after performing another online acoustic set of songs, this time from The Alternative.

=== Metanoia and Everything Is Burning (2014–2016) ===
On 17 December 2014, a countdown was started on IAMX's social media accounts. The countdown ended three days later, revealing the official announcement of a new PledgeMusic campaign for the next fan-funded album, said to be released in early fall of 2015. On 11 June 2015, the album title was announced as Metanoia. The tracks "Insomnia" and "Happiness" were included in the second season of the TV series How to Get Away with Murder, while the songs "Surrender" and "Look Outside" were featured in the third season.

In an interview talking about the album, Corner confirmed that coming out of a long period of insomnia and depression had impacted the album heavily. He described it as his least complicated and most honest work to date. In October 2015, IAMX began the 'Metanoia Tour', which started in the US, before continuing through Canada and Europe.

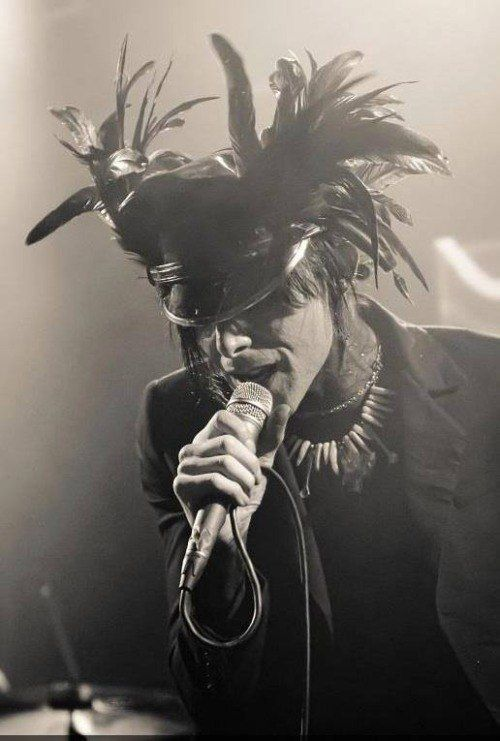
IAMX on the Everything Is Burning tour in 2016

On 2 December 2016, the album addendum Everything Is Burning was released, serving as a companion piece to Metanoia with seven previously unreleased tracks and nine remixes of Metanoia songs. Of the songs on Everything Is Burning, Corner said, "They were half written for Metanoia, there was a surplus of material that didn't make it to the album. It happens with every album that I do, where there are about 5-7 songs that don't make it. However, these tracks I felt so connected to that I didn't want to drag them into another era, they had too much of a connection to Metanoia that they had to remain connected and put the album to rest for me. This EP was in many ways me celebrating my strength and victory over that time period." As with Dogmatic Infidel Comedown OK, IAMX handpicked the artists for the remixes on Everything Is Burning. Contributors included previous collaborator Aesthetic Perfection, friend and colleague Gary Numan, and more.

In September 2016, the North American 'Everything Is Burning' tour began. The tour again spanned the US, Mexico, and Canada, before moving across the Atlantic in October to finish the tour in Europe.

=== Unfall and Alive In New Light (2017–2018) ===
On 22 September 2017, IAMX's first experimental album Unfall (the German word for 'accident') was released. For this album, Corner expanded his sonic palette and turned his past remix alias into the title of this instrumental and abstract album, which showcased him "...avoiding pop radio formats and utilizing a heavy amount of modular synthesizers." Corner referred to the album as “a way of decluttering my wired mind.”

During the recording process, Corner reconnected with famed UK producer and friend Jim Abbiss (Adele/Ladytron/Kasabian/Arctic Monkeys), whom he had worked with previously on Sneaker Pimps' debut album Becoming X and the fifth IAMX album, The Unified Field.

At that time, both artists were experimenting and agreed to meet for a week to play around. This turned into a fruitful seven days, as Jim ended up co-writing and co-producing several album tracks: "Running Point", "Trust The Machine", "Cat's Cradle", "Polar I.", "TeddyLion", "11.11", and "The Disease To Please". The last track featured vocals from The Go Go's rhythm guitarist and vocalist Jane Wiedlin. The first single from the album "Little Deaths" was released on 15 September 2017.

Meanwhile, Corner continued work on his next studio album. He teased the album online before the release of "Mile Deep Hollow". This was the first single from what would later be announced as IAMX's eighth album Alive In New Light. This track was also featured before its release in the fourth season of How To Get Away With Murder, during the mid-season finale. It was then officially released on 14 December 2018 alongside its music video.

The title track "Alive in New Light" premiered similarly in How To Get Away With Murder, being featured in the next episode after the mid-season finale. This track was then released with the album on 2 February 2018. The second single, "Stardust", featuring tattoo artist Kat Von D, was released on 5 March 2018 alongside another music video.

Corner said that "this album is about connecting, and it's a pain in the ass to do it through an album. Each time I do this, I feel exhausted but it's an impulse I can't stop. If you write your pain out, there's a venting. Happiness is a skill. I'm happiest activating skills that keep you balanced.” This longing for connection and balance would inspire Corner to create the IAMX Mental Health Gatherings. These Mental Health Gatherings were separate events held prior to IAMX live shows in 2018, with proceeds going to mental health charities. Each event featured Corner and special guests inviting a small number of fans to share their stories and advice with mental health struggles.

IAMX and his live band toured on the Alive In New Light album extensively within North America and Europe, with special guest appearances at certain shows from Kat Von D, whose vocals featured on the album, and Liam Howe on synths. Howe and Corner's performance together on stage in Los Angeles at The Belasco Theater on 25 May 2018 was their first in eighteen years, since Sneaker Pimps' hiatus in 2002.

=== Echo Echo (2019–2020) ===
In 2019, Corner announced to his Patreon that he was working on an acoustic rework album, which would feature fan favorites from the IAMX back catalogue re-imagined for the acoustic guitar. The first single and music video from the album was released 6 March 2020 for the song "Surrender", with "Kiss And Swallow" released without a video alongside the main single. An extensive tour was planned for both North America and Europe, with specific venues booked that would exemplify the looping pedal effects Corner planned to use in place of touring with a full band. However, both tours had to be cancelled due to the worldwide outbreak of COVID-19.

Determined to continue connecting with his fans, and remain a healthy outlet during a time of mental anguish and strife, Corner and his longtime collaborator, Janine Gezang, partnered up to start live-streaming the IAMX Mental Health Gatherings they had co-created and hosted during the "Mile Deep Hollow" Tour.

=== Fault Lines¹ (2023) ===
In 2023, after five years of musical endeavors involving acoustic re-imaginings, modular experimentation, and working on Squaring the Circle, the first Sneaker Pimps album in 19 years, Corner returned to the first lyrically-driven IAMX album since 2018's Alive In New Light.

Similar to Machinate, the album had a dark, modular style. Corner said on the album's influences: “These songs have been parasites in my brain for years. They were written before my experiments with modular tech, but they benefit from the addition of this production. In a sense this is a classic IAMX album from a songwriting point of view, but the sounds are a touch more fractured and fucked thanks to the modular beast now a part of my life.”

The first single from the album, 'The X ID' was released with an accompanying psychedelic music video on 21 April 2023. With the album slated to release 12 May 2023. A Spring and Fall tour were announced earlier in the year, with the first show starting in San Diego on 27 May 2023.

=== 2024 — 2025 ===
On 25th September 2025, Janine Gezang announced her departure from IAMX.

== Film, TV, and video game features ==
Beyond the sixteen albums under the IAMX alias and the four albums co-created with Sneaker Pimps, Corner composed and produced the film soundtrack Les Chevaliers du Ciel (2005) under his given name. This soundtrack includes features from Sue Denim of Robots In Disguise and the band Placebo.

Many of Corner's songs have been used in films, TV productions, and in video games. Corner's music features in The Saint (1997), Queer As Folk (2001), Hostel (2005), Grand Theft Auto V (2013), and How To Get Away With Murder (2014) with the latter featuring in 16 different songs across the show's six seasons. Those tracks are: "I Come with Knives", "The Unified Field", "Cold Red Light (Instrumental)", "Volatile Times (US version)", "Walk with the Noise", "I Salute You Christopher", "Music People", "Happiness", "Dead in This House", "The Great Shipwreck of Life", "Insomnia", "Scars", "Surrender", "Look Outside", "Mile Deep Hollow" and "Alive in New Light".

== Documentaries ==
=== You Can Be Happy: The Making of The Unified Field (2013) ===
You Can Be Happy is about the making of "The Unified Field" album, and is directed by Danny Drysdale. It features interviews with Chris Corner, producer Jim Abbiss, the live band members and Sneaker Pimps co-founder Liam Howe, plus special live and backstage footage.

=== Mile Deep Hollow: Tour Documentary (2020) ===
Mile Deep Hollow: Tour Documentary follows Chris Corner and his live band (Janine Gezang, Sammi Doll, and Jon Siren) from their early rehearsals in Southern California across the globe to Europe then back again to the final show in Los Angeles, California. With behind-the-scenes footage and detailed interviews, this documentary offers a deeper insight into the music and art project.

Known for live productions that include performance, light, and video art. Mental health is a core component of the IAMX philosophy, and as a feature of this tour, IAMX partnered with The You Rock Foundation to host Mental Health Gatherings at select stops.

== Patreon ==
IAMX started their Patreon campaign in 2019 as a new way to fund the independent nature of the project, and to facilitate more one-on-one fan interactions on a more personalized alternative to social media.

== Mental health altruism ==
During the 'Mile Deep Hollow' Tour, Corner started the IAMX Mental Health Gatherings, which were separate events held prior to IAMX live shows in 2018, with proceeds going to mental health charities. These were intimate gatherings of fans who wished to share their stories, find acceptance amongst their peers, and ask Corner and other special guests advice on how to manage their mental health struggles.

This later evolved into the IAMX podcast 'Headnoise' which were recordings of the online Mental Health Gatherings, sometimes with or sometimes without special guests. These were a way for Corner and his fans to remain connected during the global pandemic and uplift one another by sharing their struggles and advice.

== Turmwerk and Silent Valley Studios ==
From 2008 until Corner's move to Los Angeles in 2014, IAMX headquarters was located at an old GDR factory outside Berlin. Corner spoke about the move in an interview, saying that he had bought a building that used to be a waterworks factory in the former East Germany. The factory has since been named "Turmwerk" and is used for studio recording, band rehearsals, photo shoots, music video and live visual production. These productions include the music video "My Secret Friend" featuring Imogen Heap, photo shoots for the cover of IAMX's fourth studio album, Volatile Times, shot by Berlin photographer Ben Wolf and press photos for IAMX's fifth studio album, The Unified Field, by photographers Joe Dilworth and Sammi Doll. Corner said in an interview that his dream was to create a place for artists of all kinds where the main focus is on creativity and free thinking.

== Band members ==
Current members

- Chris Corner – vocals, keyboards, programming (2004–present)

Live members

- Jon Siren – drums (2015–present)
- Gözde Düzer – bass (2026–present)

Former live members

- Sue Denim – vocals (2004)
- Noel Fielding – bass (2004)
- Julian Barratt – guitars (2004)
- James Cook – keyboards, backing vocals (2004)
- Mary Ambrose – backing vocals (2004)
- Julia Davis – keyboards (2004)
- Dean Rosenzweig – guitars, bass (2006–2010)
- Tom Marsh – drums (2006–2010)
- Alberto Álvarez – guitars, vocals, drums, bass (2010–2013)
- Jon Harper – drums (2010)
- Caroline Weber – drums (2011)
- Richard Ankers – drums (2013–2014)
- Sammi Doll – keyboards, backing vocals (2013–2022)
- Janine Gezang (Janine Gebauer until 2009) – keyboards, backing vocals, bass (2006–2025)
- Sarah "Carrellee" Pray – keyboards, backing vocals (2024–2026)

== Discography ==
=== Studio albums ===
- Kiss + Swallow (Tennis Schallplatten (Germany) / Recall (France & US) / Acute Music (Austria) / Loser Friendly (UK)) – 13 July 2004
- The Alternative (61seconds - Major Records (Germany) / Metropolis (US)) – 28 April 2006
- Kingdom of Welcome Addiction (61seconds) – 19 May 2009
- Dogmatic Infidel Comedown OK (Remix Album) - (publ. 61seconds) – 19 March 2010
- Volatile Times (61seconds/BMG Rights Management) – 18 March 2011
- The Unified Field (61seconds) – 22 March 2013
- Metanoia (Orphic/Caroline International/Universal) – 2 October 2015
- Everything Is Burning (Metanoia Addendum) (Mini Album) – 2 September 2016
- Unfall (instrumental album) - (Orphic/Caroline International/Universal) – 22 September 2017
- Alive In New Light (Orphic/Caroline International/Universal) – 2 February 2018
- Echo Echo (acoustic album) - (Orphic) – 13 March 2020
- Machinate (UNFALL Productions) – 19 November 2021
- Fault Lines¹ (UNFALL Productions) – 12 May 2023
- Fault Lines² (UNFALL Productions) – 30 August 2024

=== Concert albums ===
- Live in Warsaw (publ. 61seconds) – 14 November 2008
- Mile Deep Hollow Tour (UNFALL Productions) – 16 September 2022 (live album from the 2019 tour)

=== EPs ===
- Your Joy Is My Low (EP, limited edition, publ. Acute Music) – 1 January 2004
- Your Joy Is My Low Remixes (EP, limited edition, publ. Anorak Supersport) – 26 May 2005
- IAMIXED (publ. NoCarbon) – 20 December 2008 (EP, remixes of songs from the album The Alternative performed by English musicians)
- Tear Garden (EP) – 2009
- Bernadette (EP) – 29 July 2011 (extended reissue on 16 September 2022)
- Volatile Times (EP, limited edition) – 23 September 2011
- Mile Deep Hollow (download EP) – 14 December 2018
- Unmask (EP, sold exclusively on the Fault Lines² European Tour) – April 2025.
- IAMIXED: Fault Lines Albums 1 and 2 – autumn 2025 (rework/remix album, sold exclusively on the 2025 North American Tour)

=== Singles ===
Year	Release	Label	Album
2004	"Kiss and Swallow"	Tennis Schallplatten	Kiss + Swallow
2006	"Spit It Out"	61seconds, Major Records	The Alternative
2006	"The Alternative"	Major Records	The Alternative
2007	"Nightlife"	61seconds. Major Records	The Alternative
2008	"The Alternative"	Fiction, No Carbon, Genepool (UK only)	The Alternative
2008	"Spit It Out"	Fiction, No Carbon, Genepool (UK only)	The Alternative
2008	"President"	61seconds, Fiction, No Carbon, Genepool (UK only)	The Alternative
2009	"Think of England"	61seconds	Kingdom of Welcome Addiction
2009	"Tear Garden"	61seconds	Kingdom of Welcome Addiction
2009	"My Secret Friend" (with Imogen Heap)	61seconds	Kingdom of Welcome Addiction
2011	"Ghosts of Utopia" (digital)	61seconds/BMG Rights Management	Volatile Times
2011	"Bernadette" (digital)	61seconds/BMG Rights Management	Volatile Times
2011	"Volatile Times"	61seconds/BMG Rights Management	Volatile Times
2012	"The Unified Field/Quiet The Mind" (digital)	61seconds	The Unified Field
2013	"I Come With Knives"	61seconds	The Unified Field
2013	"Come Home"	61seconds	The Unified Field
2015	"Happiness"	Orphic/Caroline International/Universal	Metanoia
2015	"Oh Cruel Darkness Embrace Me"	Orphic/Caroline International/Universal	Metanoia
2016	"North Star"	Orphic/Caroline International/Universal	Metanoia
2018	"Stardust" (digital)	Orphic/Caroline International/Universal	Alive in New Light
2018	"Mile Deep Hollow"	Orphic/Caroline International/Universal	Alive in New Light
2020	"Surrender"		Echo Echo
2021	"Art Bleeds Money"	Unfall	Machinate
2023-04-21	"The X ID"	Unfall	Fault Lines¹
2023-05-04 /2023-05-05	"Fault Lines" (EP)	Unfall	Fault Lines¹
2024-05-31	"Neurosymphony"	Unfall	Fault Lines²
2025-10-06	"The Truth (Post Truth Rework)" (download)	Unfall	IAMIXED: Fault Lines Albums 1 and 2

=== Music videos ===
Year	Title	Director
2004	"Kiss and Swallow"	
2004	"Missile" (bath version)	
2004	"Missile" (second version)	Martin Wilk
2006	"Spit It Out"	Hans Hammers Jr.
2006	"President"	Hans Hammers Jr.
2006	"Song of Imaginary Beings"	Verena Jabbs
2009	"Think of England"	Michel Briegel
2009	"Tear Garden"	Graeme Pearce
2009	"My Secret Friend" (with Imogen Heap)	Chris Corner
2009	"I Am Terrified" (Alec Empire Remix)	Chris Corner
2011	"Ghosts of Utopia"	Chris Corner
2011	"Dance With Me"	Chris Corner
2011	"Bernadette"	A Nice Idea Every Day
2011	"Volatile Times"	Michel Briegel
2013	"The Unified Field"	Adam Anthony
2013	"Quiet the Mind"	Chris Corner / Danny Drysdale
2013	"I Come With Knives"	Michel Briegel
2013	"Come Home"	Chris Corner / Janine Gezang
2015	"Happiness"	Chris Corner
2015	"Oh Cruel Darkness Embrace Me"	Danny Drysdale
2016	"North Star"	Chris Corner
2018	"Stardust"	Chris Corner
2018	"Mile Deep Hollow"	Chris Corner
2020	"Surrender (acoustic)"	Chris Corner
2022	"Art Bleeds Money"	Chris Corner
2023	"The X ID"	Chris Corner
2023	"Fault Lines" (lyric video)	Chris Corner

=== Charts ===
Year	Albums	AT	BE (W)	GER	CH
2004	Kiss + Swallow	-	84	-	-
2006	The Alternative	55	32	-	-
2009	Kingdom of Welcome Addiction	36	28	-	-
2011	Volatile Times	26	17	68	69
2013	The Unified Field	42	59	-	-
2015	Metanoia	-	142	-	-
2017	Unfall	-	-	-	-
2018	Alive In New Light	71	75	-	81
