= Les chevaliers du ciel =

Les chevaliers du ciel may refer to:

- The Aeronauts (TV series), a 1967–70 French TV series
- Sky Fighters, a 2005 French film
