= Dogmatic Infidel Comedown OK =

Remix album : Reworks and Interpretations of IAMX3 by IAMX
- Released: EU 19 March 2010; US 11 May 2010
- Label: EU 61seconds US Metropolis
- Compiler: Chris Corner

IAMX chronology
| Kingdom of Welcome Addiction (2009) | Dogmatic Infidel Comedown OK (2010) | Volatile Times (2011) |

Dogmatic Infidel Comedown OK is an album of reworks and reinterpretations of tracks from IAMX's third studio album Kingdom of Welcome Addiction.

It includes remixes by Combichrist, Pull Out Kings, Alec Empire, Vive la Fête, Black Light Odyssey, Omega Man, Aesthetic Perfection and Terrence Fixmer; covers by Miss Derringer, James Cook and Anne Marie Kirby (The Dollhouse), German band Index, and Larry Driscoll; and Chris Corner's own reworks under the alias of UNFALL.

== Background ==
"IAMX has been remixed in the past but I was never much involved in choosing the artists and somehow it always fell short of my expectations," says Corner. "This is the first time I put my attention to it. Sometimes I am the child in the candy shop with all the tingling excitement, and sometimes my anti-industry-anti-people cynicism kicks in. But I had a feeling that I wouldn't be disappointed with this collection of oddballs."

== Track listing ==
European edition
| No. | Title | Performer | Length |
|---|---|---|---|
| 1. | "Nature of Inviting" (Black Light Odyssey) | IAMX | 4:32 |
| 2. | "Tear Garden" (UNFALL ChocolateFurWine) | IAMX | 6:46 |
| 3. | "You Can Be Happy" (Combichrist) | IAMX | 4:57 |
| 4. | "Kingdom of Welcome Addiction" (Aesthetic Perfection) | IAMX | 4:46 |
| 5. | "The Great Shipwreck of Life" (Pull Out Kings) | IAMX | 4:07 |
| 6. | "Tear Garden" (UNFALL Art Deco) | IAMX | 5:31 |
| 7. | "Think of England" | Miss Derringer | 3:21 |
| 8. | "The Stupid, The Proud" | Index | 4:54 |
| 9. | "My Secret Friend" (Omega Man) | IAMX + Imogen Heap | 4:38 |
| 10. | "I Am Terrified" (Alec Empire) | IAMX | 5:03 |
| 11. | "An I for an I" (UNFALL X-Mess) | IAMX | 6:13 |
| 12. | "Nature of Inviting" (Terence Fixmer) | IAMX | 5:07 |
| 13. | "Running" | Cook/Kirby | 3:24 |
| 14. | "Church of England" (Acoustic) | IAMX | 7:48 |
| 15. | "The Great Shipwreck of Life" (Omega Man 1950 mix) | IAMX | 4:50 |
| 16. | "My Secret Friend" | Larry Driscoll | 3:26 |

- Tracks 14–16 are hidden tracks as part of track 13. Track 13 is 16:38 long.

US digital download
| No. | Title | Performer | Length |
|---|---|---|---|
| 1. | "Nature of Inviting" (Black Light Odyssey remix) | IAMX | 4:32 |
| 2. | "Tear Garden" (UNFALL ChocolateFurWine mix) | IAMX | 6:46 |
| 3. | "You Can Be Happy" (Combichrist remix) | IAMX | 4:57 |
| 4. | "Kingdom of Welcome Addiction" (Aesthetic Perfection remix) | IAMX | 4:46 |
| 5. | "The Great Shipwreck of Life" (Pull Out Kings remix) | IAMX | 4:07 |
| 6. | "Tear Garden" (UNFALL Art Deco mix) | IAMX | 5:31 |
| 7. | "Think of England" | Miss Derringer | 3:21 |
| 8. | "The Stupid, the Proud" | Index | 4:54 |
| 9. | "My Secret Friend" (Omega Man remix) | IAMX + Imogen Heap | 4:38 |
| 10. | "I Am Terrified" (Alec Empire remix) | IAMX | 5:03 |
| 11. | "An I for an I" (UNFALL X-Mess mix) | IAMX | 6:13 |
| 12. | "Nature of Inviting" (Terence Fixmer remix) | IAMX | 5:07 |
| 13. | "Running" | Cook/Kirby | 3:27 |
| 14. | "The Stupid, the Proud" (Vive la Fête remix) | IAMX | 4:04 |
| 15. | "My Secret Friend" (UNFALL remix) | IAMX | 4:44 |
