= The Alternative (album) =

Studio album by IAMX
- Released: 28 April 2006
- Genre: Electropop, dark cabaret, electronic rock
- Length: 45:22
- Label: Major; Vision Music; Anorak Supersport; Acute Music; No Carbon; Metropolis
- Producer: Chris Corner

IAMX chronology
Your Joy Is My Low Remixes (2005)	The Alternative (2006)	IAMIXED (2008)

The Alternative is the second album by English musical artist IAMX, released on 28 April 2006 in Europe and a year later in the UK and Ireland. It was re-issued on Metropolis Records in the US on 6 May 2008. It is the second IAMX album to contain tracks intended for the aborted Sneaker Pimps album SP4. 2008 US editions differ significantly from the original 2006 version. Many of the songs were significantly re-recorded or remixed, most noticeably "The Negative Sex" and "Spit It Out", as well as "The Alternative", "Nightlife" and "Song of Imaginary Beings". "This Will Make You Love Again" is among a handful of songs to have been edited to include vocals by Janine Gezang. The re-released versions also include a string version of "Spit It Out" as a hidden track. The original album and the reissues also have different covers.

The album features several songs with lyrics by Sneaker Pimps member Liam Howe and lyrical co-writer for the same band, Ian Pickering, as well as lyrical collaborations with Sue Denim and a musical collaboration with Russian musician Igor Vdovin.

== Release and promotion ==
The Alternative was released on 28 April 2006 in Germany, Poland, Austria and Benelux countries. It was released in the UK the following year through record label No Carbon, and in the US in 2008 through Metropolis.

"Nightlife" was used heavily in the promotion for the vampire film We Are the Night. It is also featured in a sequence in the film which features no dialogue but contains images set to the song.

== Reception ==
Professional ratings
Review scores
Source	Rating
AllMusic	favourable
DIY	1/5 stars
The Skinny	4/5 stars

AllMusic's review was generally favourable, with reviewer Dave Shim describing it as "a stately blend of melancholic reverie and rugged post-industrial atmospheres". The Skinny's Liam Arnold described it as "a raging piece of erotically charged, retro-futurist electro-pop. And it's bloody brilliant."

== Track listing ==
All music is composed by Chris Corner, except where noted.

No.	Title	Lyrics	Music	Length
1.	"President"			3:54
2.	"The Alternative"			4:00
3.	"Nightlife"	Corner, Sue Denim		4:21
4.	"Lulled by Numbers"	Ian Pickering		4:01
5.	"Song of Imaginary Beings"	Corner, Denim, Howe, Pickering	Corner, Liam Howe, Pickering	4:27
6.	"The Negative Sex"			3:08
7.	"Bring Me Back a Dog"			3:23
8.	"S.H.E"		Corner, Igor Vdovin	3:58
9.	"Spit It Out"			3:34
10.	"After Every Party I Die"	Corner, Howe, Pickering		3:50
11.	"This Will Make You Love Again"	Corner, Pickering		4:39

2008 reissue bonus track
No.	Title	Length
12.	"Spit It Out (String Version)"	5:52

== Charts ==
Chart	Peak position
Austria	55
Belgium Ultratop (Wallonia)	31

== Songs ==
=== Nightlife ===
"Nightlife"

Single by IAMX

from the album The Alternative
- Released: 2006
- Recorded: 2006
- Genre: Electronic
- Length: 5:01 (album version); 5:04 (single mix)
- Label: 61seconds / Major Records
- Songwriter(s): Chris Corner; Sue Denim
- Producer(s): Chris Corner

IAMX singles chronology
"Spit It Out" (2006)	"Nightlife" (2006)	"The Alternative" (2006)

'Nightlife' was the third single to be taken from The Alternative. It was co-written with his girlfriend at the time Sue Denim. The song also features in the German vampire film Wir Sind Die Nacht (We Are The Night), and is on the film's soundtrack.

No.	Title	Length
1.	"Nightlife (Single Mix)"	5:04
2.	"Nightlife (People Theatre's Trip To Berlin Mix)"	6:58
3.	"Nightlife (Crème Pruleé Remix)"	4:21
