= Live in Warsaw =

Live in Warsaw may refer to:

- Live in Warsaw (McCoy Tyner album)
- Live in Warsaw (IAMX album)
- Live in Warsaw, Poland, an album by King Crimson
