= Dijon Air Base =

Dijon-Longvic Air Base Base aérienne 102
- IATA: DIJ; ICAO: LFSD

Summary
- Airport type: Military
- Owner: Government of France
- Operator: Armée de l'air
- Serves: Dijon, Bourgogne, France
- Location: Longvic, France
- Elevation AMSL: 726 ft / 221 m
- Coordinates: 47°16′26″N 005°05′20″E
- Website: aeroport.dijon.cci.fr

Map
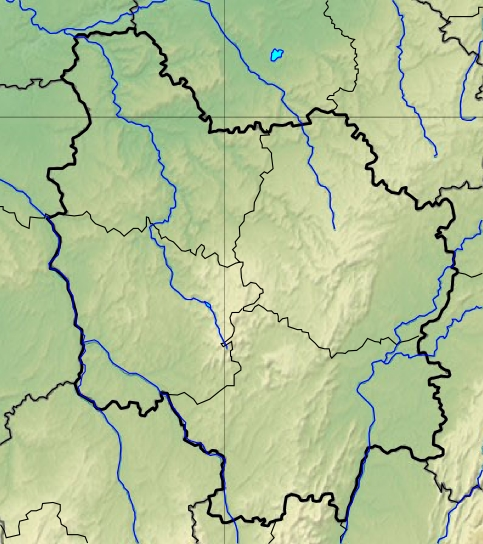
- Location of airfield in Burgundy region Location of Burgundy region in France

Runways
Direction	Length		Surface
Direction	m	ft	Surface
18/36	2,400	7,874	Paved
02/20	1,800	5,905	Paved
- Source: French AIP and airport website

Dijon-Longvic Air Base (French: Base aérienne 102 Dijon, IATA: DIJ, ICAO: LFSD) was a French Air Force (French: Armée de l'Air) air base. The airfield is located approximately 2 miles (3.2 km) east-southeast of Longvic; about 165 miles (266 km) southeast of Paris. Operating as a joint civilian base, it is today used as a commercial airport named Aéroport Dijon-Bourgogne.

== History ==
Dijon-Longvic Air Base was one of the oldest of the Armée de l'Air, being established in 1914, having origins beginning in September 1910 as a civilian aerodrome. It has been active for 102 years, through both 20th Century World Wars, the Cold War, and numerous crises. The military left the base in June 2016.

=== World War I ===
In the years following the sumptuous "aviation parties" that were held in Dijon (from 22 to 25 September 1910), the French War Department decided to build a military airfield near the city, and on 7 July 1913, nine hectares located between the villages of Ouges and Longvic, near the National Road 468, were declared of public utility.

This airfield became operational in the spring of 1914 and was assigned the headquarters of the 1st Aviation Group, which was accommodated in several aircraft hangars and barracks. Four squadrons were stationed there when the World War broke out: the BR 17, BL 18, HF 19 and MF 20. It was on this military airfield that the 2e reserve aviation unit dedicated to the centralization of deliveries made by factories working for the aviation and transit to aviation squadrons of the parks from the front of the stored goods. 2Y also worked, from 1917, a flight school dedicated to piloting aircraft manufacturing company Voisin. On May 13, 1916, there was presented to the troops the flag of the Air Force by the most famous aces of war, Lieutenant Georges Guynemer, injured two months earlier at Verdun in front of the front of the troops of 1st group.

=== Between the wars ===
After 1919, Dijon-Longvic was used for deployment of several units specializing in pursuit and observation. In 1920, saw the birth of Dijon 2e observation aviation regiment equipped with Breguet 14 (renamed later 32nd RAO). That same year, on the edge of the airfield, an area was reserved for civil aviation and the land became "mixed aerodrome". Civil aviation was built near the future base 102, at the northern end of the coast and southwest of Dijon, aeronautical lighthouse great power of Mt. Africa, situated on the air route Paris-Lyon-Marseille.

=== World War II ===
During World War II, the airport was attacked by the Luftwaffe on several occasions (10, 14 May) during the Battle of France. It was seized by the German Army in June. Initially, during the Occupation of France, it was used as a prisoner-of-war (POW) camp for French and Allied personnel, during August and September 1940, who surrendered during the German Blitzkrieg, being named "Front Stalag 155". While a POW camp, prisoners were used to clear the wreckage of destroyed aircraft and tear down destroyed buildings. German engineers moved in during the winter of 1940/1941 and expanded the main runway from 800 to 1400m in length, in addition to constructing many new buildings to replace the destroyed French facilities.

The first operational Luftwaffe unit to take up residence at Dijon was IV/KG 55 "Greiff", in February 1941, consisting of three squadrons (Staffel) numbers 10, 11 and 12, equipped with twelve Heinkel He 111 bombers each. The unit also included a number of Gotha Go 145 and Junkers Ju 52s. This unit took part in many bombing missions over England. In March 1943, II/NJG4 arrived, a night fighter unit, equipped with three squadrons of Messerschmitt Bf 110s; Dornier Do 217 N-1s (RADAR equipped), and Junkers Ju 88 Ns.

Also in 1943, I/Luftlandgeschwader 2. arrived at Dijon from the Crimea in the Eastern Front, equipped with Heinkel 111Z reconnaissance aircraft, as well as Gotha Go 242 gliders. The unit only stayed at Dijon briefly, being moved to Istres for use in the Italian Campaign.

While under Luftwaffe control, Dijon Air Base was attacked by the United States Army Air Forces Eighth Air Force heavy Boeing B-17 Flying Fortress groups on several occasions in 1944 (28 March, 25 April and August 14). Tactical air units of Twelfth Air Force, moving up from Southern France as part of Operation Dragoon attacked the base with Martin B-26 Marauder medium bombers and Republic P-47 Thunderbolt attacks, dropping 500-pound general-purpose bombs on the airfield, hangars, maintenance shops and other support buildings, causing great damage to the Luftwaffe aircraft as well as destroying much of the support station.

With the Allied ground forces advancing into the Dijon area, the Germans evacuated the base on 10 September 1944. Prior to their retreat, German engineers attempted to destroy what little remained after the bombing attacks; they blew up the control tower, shelters, bunkers, ammunition and gasoline, water towers, tanks, electrical transformers, and barracks.

On 12 September, the first American units arrived at the base. The base was almost totally destroyed, and rehabilitation into an operational combat airfield was begun almost immediately by the USAAF IX Engineering Command 847th Engineer Aviation Battalion, which specialized in repair of captured airfields. Work began clearing the base of mines and destroyed Luftwaffe aircraft and repairing operational facilities for use by American aircraft. A metal pierced steel planking patch was laid down over the bomb damaged runway to allow aircraft operations, as well as repairing what could be repaired quickly, and moved in what equipment was necessary to conduct combat operations. Their work paid off, as Dijon Air Base was declared operationally ready on 25 September, about two weeks after their arrival. It was designated as Advanced Landing Ground "Y-9" as an American airfield.

USAAF units assigned to the airfield were:

- 415th Night Fighter Squadron (Twelfth Air Force), September– November 1944, Bristol Beaufighter
- 320th Bombardment Group, 11 November 1944 – 1 April 1945 B-26 Marauder, North American B-25 Mitchell (12th AF)
- 17th Bombardment Group, 20 November 1944 – June 1945, B-26 Marauder (12th AF)

It was also the Headquarters of the 42d Bombardment Group between November 1944 and July 1945. Each of the bomb groups had three or four combat squadrons of aircraft assigned to the airfield. From Dijon, attacks on German ground forces, bridges, airfields still in Luftwaffe hands, railroads and any target of opportunity, of the German forces, were targets of the bombers as the ground forces moved north and east into Luxembourg and past the Siegfried Line into Germany.

In addition to the American units, the Free French Air Force operated B-26 Marauders from Dijon beginning on 11 October 1944. Dijon was returned to the French Air Ministry by the Americans on 1 July 1945.

=== Postwar history ===
The war had left the airbase in genuine ruins, littered with rubble, debris, scrap metal and charred remains of airplanes. A number of aircraft remains and unexploded German munitions had been hastily bulldozed into bomb craters, all of which needed to be removed. The station area and the hangars and aircraft mechanical shops were devastated, also with huge quantities of unexploded munitions still littering the ground. The American combat engineers had carried out considerable repair work on the runway, and constructed temporary structures for repair and maintenance of aircraft; however, the personnel lived in tents as repair of the barracks was not considered a priority for aircraft operations.

After much reconstruction, Dijon was returned to operational service for the French Air Force. The airfield was rebuilt and reopened in 1949. Responsible for air defense of France, BA 102 received in 1949 the 2d Fighter Wing and its squadrons, and became the first air base of the Air Force to be equipped with jet aircraft: the De Havilland DH.100 Vampire. The basic air units were, thereafter, with priority for several generations of Dassault aircraft, those being the M.D.450 Ouragan in 1953, the Mystere IVA in 1956, the Mirage IIIC in 1961, then the Mirage IIIE in 1968. BA 102 also served as the backdrop to one of the most famous French comic series, the Tanguy and Laverdure and its television series adaptation: Sky Fighters.

In 1984, the Dassault Mirage 2000C arrived, upgraded in 1999 by the 2000-5F, contributing to a modern, front-line NATO facility. BA 102 was the first basis for Europe to have a multi-target interceptor and a weapons system of such technology.

Reorganization of the French air force has pushed the Dijon base into a secondary role in the 21st century. In 2014, the assigned fighter squadrons were reassigned and the base was put into a reserve status. It was closed officially in June 2016.

== Squadrons and aircraft ==
- Staff Command force protection and security of the Air Force (CFPSA)
- 2 fighter squadrons (1/2 Cigognes; 2/2 Côte d'Or) equipped with the Mirage 2000-5 (air defense)

== Airlines and destinations ==
Effective 5 June 2014, there are no scheduled passenger flights from Dijon. The airfield is open to business and general aviation. The Gendarmerie also have a helicopter unit here with perhaps two helicopters.

== Climate ==
Climate data for Dijon (DIJ), elevation: 219 m (719 ft), 1981–2010 normals, extremes 1921–present
Month	Jan	Feb	Mar	Apr	May	Jun	Jul	Aug	Sep	Oct	Nov	Dec	Year
Record high °C (°F)	16.5 (61.7)	21.1 (70.0)	23.5 (74.3)	29.0 (84.2)	34.4 (93.9)	37.3 (99.1)	39.5 (103.1)	39.3 (102.7)	34.2 (93.6)	28.3 (82.9)	21.6 (70.9)	17.5 (63.5)	39.5 (103.1)
Mean daily maximum °C (°F)	4.8 (40.6)	7.0 (44.6)	11.8 (53.2)	15.2 (59.4)	19.5 (67.1)	23.2 (73.8)	26.1 (79.0)	25.6 (78.1)	21.1 (70.0)	15.7 (60.3)	9.2 (48.6)	5.6 (42.1)	15.4 (59.7)
Daily mean °C (°F)	2.0 (35.6)	3.3 (37.9)	7.1 (44.8)	10.1 (50.2)	14.3 (57.7)	17.7 (63.9)	20.3 (68.5)	19.9 (67.8)	16.0 (60.8)	11.6 (52.9)	6.0 (42.8)	2.9 (37.2)	11.0 (51.8)
Mean daily minimum °C (°F)	−0.8 (30.6)	−0.4 (31.3)	2.4 (36.3)	4.9 (40.8)	9.1 (48.4)	12.3 (54.1)	14.5 (58.1)	14.3 (57.7)	10.9 (51.6)	7.4 (45.3)	2.8 (37.0)	0.3 (32.5)	6.5 (43.7)
Record low °C (°F)	−21.3 (−6.3)	−22.0 (−7.6)	−15.3 (4.5)	−5.3 (22.5)	−3.3 (26.1)	0.8 (33.4)	2.8 (37.0)	4.3 (39.7)	−1.6 (29.1)	−4.9 (23.2)	−10.6 (12.9)	−20.8 (−5.4)	−22.0 (−7.6)
Average precipitation mm (inches)	57.4 (2.26)	43.8 (1.72)	48.3 (1.90)	58.2 (2.29)	86.6 (3.41)	68.1 (2.68)	66.0 (2.60)	60.1 (2.37)	64.5 (2.54)	70.9 (2.79)	73.2 (2.88)	63.4 (2.50)	760.5 (29.94)
Average precipitation days (≥ 1.0 mm)	10.9	8.5	9.7	9.7	11.3	9.2	8.2	7.7	7.9	10.1	11.0	11.0	115.3
Mean monthly sunshine hours	63.9	94.4	151.3	185.4	212.3	239.1	248.3	233.6	181.3	117.2	67.8	54.2	1,848.8
Source: Meteo France,

Climate data for Dijon (DIJ), elevation: 219 m (719 ft), 1961-1990 normals and extremes
Month	Jan	Feb	Mar	Apr	May	Jun	Jul	Aug	Sep	Oct	Nov	Dec	Year
Record high °C (°F)	15.1 (59.2)	19.9 (67.8)	23.5 (74.3)	27.4 (81.3)	30.0 (86.0)	34.9 (94.8)	38.1 (100.6)	35.6 (96.1)	32.8 (91.0)	28.1 (82.6)	20.6 (69.1)	17.5 (63.5)	38.1 (100.6)
Mean maximum °C (°F)	7.9 (46.2)	12.6 (54.7)	15.0 (59.0)	18.6 (65.5)	22.1 (71.8)	27.8 (82.0)	30.6 (87.1)	27.3 (81.1)	25.6 (78.1)	17.6 (63.7)	12.7 (54.9)	8.2 (46.8)	30.6 (87.1)
Mean daily maximum °C (°F)	4.6 (40.3)	6.6 (43.9)	10.9 (51.6)	14.7 (58.5)	18.5 (65.3)	22.1 (71.8)	25.2 (77.4)	24.5 (76.1)	21.2 (70.2)	15.9 (60.6)	8.4 (47.1)	5.0 (41.0)	14.8 (58.7)
Daily mean °C (°F)	1.9 (35.4)	3.5 (38.3)	6.4 (43.5)	9.7 (49.5)	13.6 (56.5)	16.9 (62.4)	19.5 (67.1)	19.0 (66.2)	16.0 (60.8)	11.4 (52.5)	5.7 (42.3)	2.5 (36.5)	10.5 (50.9)
Mean daily minimum °C (°F)	−0.8 (30.6)	0.2 (32.4)	2.5 (36.5)	4.9 (40.8)	8.7 (47.7)	12.0 (53.6)	14.0 (57.2)	13.6 (56.5)	10.8 (51.4)	7.2 (45.0)	2.9 (37.2)	−0.3 (31.5)	6.3 (43.4)
Mean minimum °C (°F)	−7.4 (18.7)	−7.2 (19.0)	−1.1 (30.0)	3.2 (37.8)	6.5 (43.7)	9.9 (49.8)	12.3 (54.1)	11.9 (53.4)	8.7 (47.7)	4.7 (40.5)	−0.5 (31.1)	−4.3 (24.3)	−7.4 (18.7)
Record low °C (°F)	−21.3 (−6.3)	−15.6 (3.9)	−11.2 (11.8)	−4.0 (24.8)	−1.0 (30.2)	2.9 (37.2)	5.2 (41.4)	5.0 (41.0)	2.2 (36.0)	−4.7 (23.5)	−10.6 (12.9)	−16.0 (3.2)	−21.3 (−6.3)
Average precipitation mm (inches)	61.8 (2.43)	51.0 (2.01)	52.3 (2.06)	45.0 (1.77)	71.3 (2.81)	59.3 (2.33)	45.5 (1.79)	59.3 (2.33)	50.5 (1.99)	51.9 (2.04)	59.9 (2.36)	56.5 (2.22)	664.3 (26.14)
Average precipitation days (≥ 1.0 mm)	11.0	9.5	11.0	10.0	12.0	8.5	7.5	8.0	7.5	8.0	10.5	10.5	114
Average snowy days	7.1	5.4	3.6	1.4	0.1	0.0	0.0	0.0	0.0	0.1	2.7	5.1	25.5
Average relative humidity (%)	88	82	76	71	74	72	68	71	78	85	87	89	78
Mean monthly sunshine hours	53.1	88.4	140.3	177.8	204.4	234.9	266.2	229.4	193.7	121.4	67.8	53.8	1,831.2
Percentage possible sunshine	19.0	31.0	39.0	44.0	44.0	50.0	56.0	53.0	52.0	36.0	25.0	21.0	39.2
Source 1: NOAA
Source 2: Infoclimat.fr (humidity)
