= We're in the Music Biz =

We're In the Music Biz

Studio album by Robots in Disguise
- Released: 4 February 2008
- Genre: Electroclash; Electropunk
- Label: President Records
- Producer: Chris Corner

Robots in Disguise chronology
Get RID! (2005)	We're In the Music Biz (2008)

Professional ratings
Review scores
Source	Rating
NME	7/10 stars
BBC	(favourable)
The Sunday Times	4/5 stars
Pitchfork	6.9/10 stars

We're In the Music Biz is the third album by Robots in Disguise. On the cover of the album the band members, Dee Plume and Sue Denim, are naked. The clothes they appear to be wearing is body paint.

== Track listing ==
All tracks are written by Dee Plume and Sue Denim

No.	Title	Length
1.	"We're In the Music Biz"	3:36
2.	"Can't Stop Getting Wasted"	2:31
3.	"The Sex Has Made Me Stupid"	3:10
4.	"Animals"	2:47
5.	"The Tears"	3:35
6.	"I Don't Have a God"	3:58
7.	"I Live In Berlin"	3:47
8.	"I'm Hit"	3:38
9.	"Everybody's Going Crazy"	3:12
10.	"Don't Copy Me"	3:30
Total length:		33:44
