= My Secret Friend =

Single by IAMX + Imogen Heap

from the album Kingdom of Welcome Addiction
- Released: 12 October 2009
- Recorded: 2008–2009
- Genre: Electropop
- Length: 3:45 (radio edit); 4:06 (album version)
- Label: 61seconds
- Songwriter(s): Chris Corner, Imogen Heap
- Producer(s): Chris Corner

IAMX singles chronology
| "Tear Garden" (2009) | "My Secret Friend" (2009) | "Ghosts of Utopia" (2011) |

Imogen Heap singles chronology
| "First Train Home" (2009) | "My Secret Friend" (2009) | "Lifeline" (2011) |

"My Secret Friend" is a song performed by IAMX and Imogen Heap, released as the third single from the album Kingdom of Welcome Addiction. The CD single is available only through the IAMX webstore.

== Music video ==
The music video, directed by Chris Corner, features Corner dressed as a woman, the video's lead female character, and Heap as a man, the lead male character. He stated in an interview that when he wrote it he pictured the characters as siblings, who have a romantic, possibly incestuous, relationship. The video is featured on the CD single.

== Track listing ==
All lyrics are written by Chris Corner and Imogen Heap

| No. | Title | Length |
|---|---|---|
| 1. | "My Secret Friend (radio edit)" | 3:45 |
| 2. | "My Secret Friend (Omega Man remix)" | 4:45 |
| 3. | "My Secret Friend (The Unfall Broken Waltz rework)" (features vocals only by Chris Corner) | 4:41 |
| 4. | "My Secret Friend" (official music video) | 4:31 |
| 5. | "Running" (home video – acoustic – bonus) | 4:44 |

== Song versions ==
- Album version – 4:06
- Radio edit – 3:45
- Omega Man remix – 4:45, remixed and additionally produced by Joe Wilson.
- The Unfall Broken Waltz rework – 4:41, remixed by Corner under the alias Unfall, this version doesn't include Heap's vocals.
- "Mein geheimer Freund" – 4:00, solo acoustic piano version in German released at IAMX's official YouTube channel announcing his Germany tour.
- Interpretation by Larry Driscoll – 3:27, cover version included on Dogmatic Infidel Comedown OK as a hidden song in a 4-song track.

== Chart positions ==
| Chart (2009) | Peak position |
|---|---|
| Belgian (Wallonia) Singles Chart | 58 |
