= Volatile Times (song) =

Single by IAMX

from the album Volatile Times
- Released: September 23, 2011
- Recorded: 2010
- Genre: Industrial
- Length: 4:28 (IAMseX UNFALL Rework); 5:12 (album version)
- Songwriter(s): Chris Corner
- Producer(s): Chris Corner

IAMX singles chronology
"Bernadette" (2011)	"Volatile Times" (2011)	"The Unified Field / Quiet the Mind" (2012)

"Volatile Times" is a song by IAMX, which was released as the third single from the studio album Volatile Times. A remix EP was released as a digital download as well as a CD, with only 500 copies available for distribution and all pre-orders were signed by Chris himself.

== Music video ==
A music video for the single, shot and directed by Michel Briegel, was released on September 16, 2011. It uses the IAMseX UNFALL rework, composed by Corner.

Chris stated, "I don't know what this video is yet. It was the first video from this album that I was not in control of. I wanted to just walk into the shoot like a careless rockstar and feel the music. We shot over two days and the chaos increased over that time. By the end Janine Gezang [live keyboards/bass, vocals] was the demonic blood soaked sex nun floating in a swimming pool and I was the drunken, crying Hersheys chocolate syrup monster in the white room of an asylum. You get the picture."

== Track listing ==
No.	Title	Length
1.	"Volatile Times (IAMseX UNFALL Rework)"	4:28
2.	"Volatile Times (Clayton Worbeck Mix)"	6:23
3.	"Volatile Times (Glen STRANGERS Trip Wave Remix)"	5:46
4.	"Volatile Times (Noblesse Oblige Remix)"	4:32
