= Kiss + Swallow =

Studio album by IAMX
- Released: 13 July 2004
- Genre: Electronic, synthpop
- Length: 60:56
- Label: Loser Friendly; LFLP02, Recall; RECALL045
- Producer: Chris Corner

IAMX chronology
Your Joy Is My Low (2004)	Kiss + Swallow (2004)	Your Joy Is My Low Remixes (2005)

Alternative cover
- US Re-release cover

Professional ratings
Review scores
Source	Rating
AllMusic	3/5 stars
Pitchfork Media	6/10 stars

Kiss + Swallow is the debut album by IAMX and was released on 13 July 2004. It mostly consists of tracks that were recorded for the unreleased fourth studio album by Sneaker Pimps, which is dubbed "SP4" by the fans.

== Overview ==
Kiss + Swallow was an extreme departure from Chris Corner's work with Sneaker Pimps. Almost completely electronic, the album incorporates driving synth-rock ("Kiss + Swallow", "Your Joy Is My Low"), lush, atmospheric, melody driven ballads ("Mercy", "I Like Pretending", "Simple Girl") and groove-based, erotic electro ("Sailor", "Naked But Safe", "You Stick It In Me"). The album was recorded entirely in Chris Corner's private home studio in London between late 2003 and early 2004.

A demo version of this album also exists. This so-called "US Promo" was leaked to the internet shortly after the official release. Most tracks are similar to the finished product. However, some tracks, such as "Skin Vision", "Simple Girl", "Sailor" and "You Stick It In Me" (known on the promo as "Life? Question?", are noticeably different and include different music, different melodies and in the case of "Skin Vision", completely different lyrics.

== Release ==
The single "Your Joy Is My Low" was first released on IAMX's debut promo EP Your Joy Is My Low in Austria during his first tour in June 2004. Only 222 copies were made available. A one track promo CD single was released in 2004 by Belgian label Anorak Supersport. On 26 May 2005, a remix maxi-single titled Your Joy Is My Low Remixes was released on the Anorak Supersport label (Belgium). Only 500 copies were made available for distribution. It was also released as a digital download. On 10 July 2020 the digital version was re-released as Your Joy Is My Low - EP with the same cover as the EP Your Joy Is My Low from 2004.

Another single, "Missile", was released in 2005 as a promo single with another track "This Will Make You Love Again". The latter appeared on his 2006 album The Alternative. Two music videos were released for "Missile." One consists almost entirely of an upside down, overhead shot of Corner in a bathtub, with his head underwater and a strip of tape over his mouth. Over the course of the video, the message written on the tape changes from 'LOVE ME' to 'HATE ME' to 'HELP ME' as a hand appears in shot and forces his head to stay under. The second features Corner's girlfriend at the time, Sue Denim of the band Robots in Disguise and, in keeping with IAMX's music, is highly erotic, featuring S&M and bondage, with Denim as a dominatrix of sorts, with Corner at her mercy. The video ends with her giving him a glowing capsule and forcing him to swallow it, at the same time as the lyric "You're taking my life away" is sung.

During live concerts, Chris Corner has introduced "Sailor" with the preface, "This is for all you bi-curious people out there".

In 2006, the album was reissued with two additional tracks: "I-Polaroids" and the Moonbootica remix of "Kiss and Swallow". Both "IAMX" and "Kiss and Swallow" are listed as a single track on the reissue. "Kiss and Swallow (Moonbootica Remix)" was previously released on the "Kiss & Swallow" single.

On 17 June 2008 Kiss + Swallow was re-released in the US. This release carries an alternative cover.

== Track listing ==
Original 2004 release:

All lyrics are written by Chris Corner; all music is composed by Chris Corner.

No.	Title	Lyrics	Length
1.	"IAMX"		0:14
2.	"Kiss and Swallow"		5:15
3.	"Sailor"		5:12
4.	"Naked But Safe"	Ian Pickering	5:23
5.	"Simple Girl"		4:42
6.	"Mercy"		6:01
7.	"Your Joy Is My Low"		5:17
8.	"I Like Pretending"		5:16
9.	"You Stick It in Me"	Sue Denim	4:19
10.	"Skin Vision"		5:11
11.	"Missile"	Pickering	3:36
12.	"White Suburb Impressionism"	Pickering	5:06
13.	"Heatwave"		5:08

2006 reissue:

All lyrics are written by Chris Corner; all music is composed by Chris Corner.

No.	Title	Lyrics	Length
1.	"Kiss and Swallow" ("IAMX" and "Kiss and Swallow" merged into one track)		5:30
2.	"Sailor"		5:13
3.	"Naked But Safe"	Ian Pickering	5:23
4.	"Simple Girl"		4:42
5.	"Mercy"		6:02
6.	"Your Joy Is My Low"		5:18
7.	"I Like Pretending"		5:16
8.	"You Stick It in Me"	Sue Denim	4:19
9.	"Skin Vision"		5:11
10.	"Missile"	Pickering	3:36
11.	"White Suburb Impressionism"	Pickering	5:06
12.	"Heatwave"		5:12
13.	"i-Polaroids"		3:55
14.	"Kiss and Swallow (Moonbootica Remix)"		6:09
15.	"Missile [video]"		3:39

== Charts ==
Chart	Peak position
Belgium Ultratop (Wallonia)	84
