= Jacques Santi =

French film producer and actor

- Born: 11 March 1939; Paris, France
- Died: 29 March 1988 (aged 49); Paris, France
- Occupations: Actor; film producer

Jacques Santi (11 March 1939 – 29 March 1988) was a French film producer from Paris, France. He was an actor best known for roles such as Bob Morane (1961), The Aeronauts (1967).

He was also nominated for a César Award a major French film award.

== Filmography ==
- Bob Morane
- The Aeronauts - TV series 1967–1970
- Une souris chez les hommes
- Heaven on One's Head
- A Stroke of 1000 Millions
- Angelique and the Sultan (1968)
