= Metanoia (IAMX album) =

Studio album by IAMX
- Released: 2 October 2015
- Recorded: Los Angeles
- Genre: Electro-industrial, synth-pop
- Label: Orphic
- Producer: Chris Corner

IAMX chronology
The Unified Field (2013)	Metanoia (2015)	Everything Is Burning (2016)

Singles from Metanoia
- 1. "Happiness" Released: 19th June 2015; 2. "Oh Cruel Darkness Embrace Me" Released: 25 September 2015; 3. "North Star" Released: 19 February 2016

Metanoia is the sixth studio album by British musician IAMX, released on 2 October 2015, almost four months after its album title official announcement on 11 June 2015 on the band's PledgeMusic page.

The first single from the album, "Happiness", was released digitally on 19 June 2015. The second single, "Oh Cruel Darkness Embrace Me", was released on 25 September 2015.

Two tracks from the album were featured in the second season of the TV series How to Get Away with Murder, viz., "Happiness" in episode 1 and "Insomnia" in episode 14. "Surrender" also appeared on the ninth episode of the third season. "Look Outside" would also appear on episode fifteen, the season finale, of the third season.

== Track listing ==
All tracks are written by Chris Corner

No.	Title	Length
1.	"No Maker Made Me"	4:00
2.	"Happiness"	3:48
3.	"North Star"	4:23
4.	"Say Hello Melancholia"	4:37
5.	"The Background Noise"	3:38
6.	"Insomnia"	4:41
7.	"Look Outside"	3:21
8.	"Oh Cruel Darkness Embrace Me"	3:12
9.	"Aphrodisiac"	4:10
10.	"Surrender"	3:42
11.	"Wildest Wind"	4:47

== Personnel ==
- Chris Corner — performer, producer, programming, mixing, mastering
- Janine Gezang — additional vocals (tracks 1, 2, 3, 7, 8, and 11)

== Charts ==
Chart	Peak position
Belgium Ultratop (Wallonia)	142
