= Jay Boy =

British record label

Jay Boy was a record label established as part of President Records in the United Kingdom, primarily to release records in Britain from American sources. It was formed in 1968 and released records until 1976.

The first release on the label was "You Can't Do That" by Doris Willingham, later known as Doris Duke. In all, the label released 116 singles. Its most successful releases in the UK were originally issued in the US on the TK label, including "Rock Your Baby" by George McCrae, a British no. 1 hit in 1974, and several other hits by both McCrae and KC and the Sunshine Band.
