= Volatile Times =

Studio album by IAMX
- Released: 18 March 2011 (Europe); 2 September 2013 (US)
- Recorded: 2010
- Genres: Electro-industrial; dark cabaret; synth-pop; experimental
- Length: 49:15
- Label: BMG / Rough Trade
- Producer: Chris Corner

IAMX chronology
| Dogmatic Infidel Comedown OK (2010) | Volatile Times (2011) | The Unified Field (2013) |

Singles from Volatile Times
- 1. "Ghosts of Utopia" Released: 25 February 2011; 2. "Bernadette" Released: 29 July 2011; 3. "Volatile Times" Released: 23 September 2011

Volatile Times is the fourth studio album from IAMX. It was released on 18 March 2011 and the tracks on the album keep alive the cabaret-esque and dark electronic sound that Chris Corner has become known for. The track "Volatile Times" was featured on season 1 episode 5 of How to Get Away with Murder, both the US and instrumental versions of "I Salute You Christopher" on episode 11, as well as the US version of "Music People" on episode 14.

== Release and promotion ==
Bernardette EP

Volatile Times is the first IAMX album released on vinyl.

New songs from the album that were performed on 22 October 2010 at the Prague show at Meet Factory included "Fire and Whispers", "Bernadette", "Oh Beautiful Town", "Music People", and "Cold Red Light".

The lead single from the album, "Ghosts of Utopia", premiered on Czech Radio 1 on 23 January. It was released as a digital download on 25 February and includes a remix by Noblesse Oblige, who were the supporting band for the Fire & Whispers Tour. A music video for the single, directed and edited by Chris Corner, premiered on tape.tv on 23 February.

A free download of "Fire and Whispers" was made available on 4 March, as part of the countdown of the album. The full album was leaked online on 12 March, a fact that Corner acknowledged on the day of the album's release.

On 2 September 2013 the album was released digitally in the US with an alternative cover, and all songs were remixed and remastered by Chris Corner.

== Track listing ==
- All songs written by Chris Corner:

| No. | Title | Length |
|---|---|---|
| 1. | "I Salute You Christopher" | 2:57 |
| 2. | "Music People" | 4:30 |
| 3. | "Volatile Times" | 5:10 |
| 4. | "Fire and Whispers" | 4:24 |
| 5. | "Dance with Me" | 3:45 |
| 6. | "Bernadette" | 5:18 |
| 7. | "Ghosts of Utopia" | 4:24 |
| 8. | "Commanded by Voices" | 4:36 |
| 9. | "Into Asylum" | 2:28 |
| 10. | "Cold Red Light" | 4:57 |
| 11. | "Oh Beautiful Town" | 6:13 |

Digital deluxe edition bonus content
| No. | Title | Length |
|---|---|---|
| 12. | "Avalanches" | 5:22 |
| 13. | "Ghosts of Utopia" (video) | 3:45 |

Vinyl

2-vinyl, it includes the 11-track CD as a bonus.

Vinyl 1, side A
| No. | Title | Length |
|---|---|---|
| 1. | "Music People" | 4:30 |
| 2. | "Fire and Whispers" | 4:24 |
| 3. | "Dance with Me" | 3:45 |

Vinyl 1, side B
| No. | Title | Length |
|---|---|---|
| 1. | "Cold Red Light" | 4:57 |
| 2. | "Commanded by Voices" | 4:36 |
| 3. | "Avalanches" | 5:22 |

Vinyl 2, side A
| No. | Title | Length |
|---|---|---|
| 1. | "Volatile Times" | 5:10 |
| 2. | "Ghosts of Utopia" | 4:24 |
| 3. | "I Salute You Christopher" | 2:57 |

Vinyl 2, side B
| No. | Title | Length |
|---|---|---|
| 1. | "Bernadette" | 5:18 |
| 2. | "Into Asylum" | 2:28 |
| 3. | "Oh Beautiful Town" | 6:13 |

US Edition

All songs reworked, and remastered by Chris Corner. Released digitally only.

1. Music People
2. Ghosts of Utopia
3. Volatile Times (IAMseX UNFALL Rework)
4. Fire and Whispers
5. Bernadette
6. Dance With Me
7. Avalanches
8. Cold Red Light
9. Into Asylum
10. Commanded By Voices
11. Oh Beautiful Town
12. I Salute You Christopher
13. Bernadette (Post Romanian Storm)
14. Volatile Times

== Chart positions ==
| Chart | Peak position |
|---|---|
| Austria | 26 |
| Belgium (Wallonia) | 17 |
| Germany | 68 |
| Switzerland | 69 |
