= Tanguy et Laverdure =

French comic book series (1959 onwards)

Les Aventures de Tanguy et Laverdure
- Cover of L'École des Aigles (1961), the first Les Aventures de Michel Tanguy album
- Created by: Jean-Michel Charlier and Albert Uderzo

Publication information
- Publisher: Dargaud
- Formats: Original material for the series has been published as a strip in the comics anthology(s) Pilote magazine, Tintin magazine, Super As, Le Pélerin and Moustique Junior.
- Original language: French
- Genre: War
- Publication date: October 1959
- Main character(s): Michel Tanguy; Ernest Laverdure

Creative team
- Writer(s): Jean-Michel Charlier
- Artist(s): Albert Uderzo, Jijé

Reprints
- The series has been reprinted, at least in part, in Danish, Dutch, English, German, Indonesian, Norwegian, Portuguese, Serbo-Croatian, Spanish, and Swedish.

Les Aventures de Tanguy et Laverdure (The Adventures of Tanguy and Laverdure) is a Franco-Belgian comics series (bande dessinée) created by Jean-Michel Charlier and Albert Uderzo, about the two pilots Michel Tanguy and Ernest Laverdure, and their adventures in the French Air Force.

== Publication history ==
Initially titled Michel Tanguy, it made its debut in the first issue of the Franco-Belgian comics magazine Pilote on October 29, 1959. The series provided Pilote with a competitor to the older, but similar, series Buck Danny serialised in Spirou magazine (incidentally also written by Charlier as his first major bande dessinée series), and Dan Cooper, which appeared in Tintin magazine.

Started in October 1959, the series was continuously published by Pilote until June 1971. Then its publication went on in Tintin (1973), Super As (1979/1980), the Catholic magazine Le Pélerin (around 1981/1984), Moustique Junior (Belgium; 1988). In 2002, the series was resumed by two new authors, after a long break caused by Charlier's death.

Tanguy et Laverdure has been translated into languages such as Italian, German, Dutch, Danish, Indonesian, English, Spanish, Portuguese and Serbocroatian. It was adapted into the televised series Les Chevaliers du Ciel, initially broadcast 1967–69 and 1988–91, and additionally adapted into the 2005 film Les Chevaliers du Ciel.

=== English publications ===
The comic has been published in English in the British comic magazine Lion between April and September 1966 under a different title, The Flying Furies. The main characters were renamed with English names, Tanguy became Jim 'Jet' Power and Laverdure, Terry Madden. "Flying Furies" was the translation of the first Tanguy et Laverdure adventure "L'Ecole des Aigles". There was also a hardcover annual published in 1972 with the title The Aeronauts, the same title as the TV series broadcast in Britain. This annual publication was a slightly edited compilation of two original albums, 11. Destination Pacifique and 12. Menace sur Mururoa, and used the characters' French names.

== Story ==
Tanguy and Laverdure are two friends from the flying school with opposite personalities. While Tanguy is serious, honest and obedient, Laverdure is eccentric, blundering and awkward, as well as an irredeemable skirt-chaser. However, Laverdure is a strong teammate for Tanguy in difficult situations. Dangerous missions and spying are everyday tasks for the two pilots, who are flying aces and efficient defenders of their homeland.

Leaving the Salon-de-Provence Air School, they are sent to the Meknès Air School to improve their knowledge. Just arrived, they search through the snowy Anti-Atlas to retrieve a lost warhead with confidential information. Later, Michel Tanguy and Ernest Laverdure join the Cigognes squadron, (which once included such flying aces as Georges Guynemer) where they pilot the Mirage III plane. Their adventures lead them to Dijon air base, Tel Aviv and Greenland.

== Bibliography ==
By Jean-Michel Charlier and Albert Uderzo

- 1. L'École des Aigles (Dargaud, 1961) - Aircraft: T-33
- 2. Pour l'Honneur des Cocardes (Dargaud, 1962) - Aircraft: T-33
- 3. Danger dans le Ciel (Dargaud, 1963) – Aircraft: Super Mystère B-2
- 4. Escadrille des Cigognes (Dargaud, 1964)
- 5. Mirage sur l'Orient (Dargaud, 1965)
- 6. Canon Bleu ne répond plus (Dargaud, 1966) – Aircraft: Mirage IIIE
- 7. Cap Zéro (Dargaud, 1967)
- 8. Pirates du Ciel (Dargaud, 1967, with Jean Giraud and Marcel Uderzo) – Aircraft: Mirage IIIC / Spitfire

By Jean-Michel Charlier and Jijé

- 9. Les Anges Noirs (Dargaud, 1968) – Aircraft: Saab 35 Draken
- 10. Mission Spéciale (Dargaud, 1968 with Albert Uderzo p. 1-16)
- 11. Destination Pacifique (Dargaud, 1969)
- 12. Menace sur Mururoa (Dargaud, 1969)
- 13. Lieutenant Double Bang (Dargaud, 1970)
- 14. Baroud sur le Désert (Dargaud, 1970)
- 15. Les Vampires attaquent la Nuit (Dargaud, 1971)
- 16. La Terreur vient du Ciel (Dargaud, 1971)
- Special: L'Avion qui tuait ses Pilotes (Hachette, 1971) – illustrated novelisation, not a comic
- 17. Mission "Dernière chance" (Dargaud, 1972)
- 18. Un DC.8 a disparu (Dargaud, 1973, with Patrice Serres)
- 19. La Mystérieuse Escadre Delta (Fleurus, 1979)
- 21. Premières missions (Hachette, 1981, with Daniel Chauvin)
- 22. Station Brouillard (Hachette, 1982, with Daniel Chauvin)

By Jean-Michel Charlier and Patrice Serres

- 20. Opération Tonnerre (Novedi, 1981, with Jijé)
- 23. Plan de Vol pour l'Enfer (Novedi, 1982)
- 24. Espion venu du Ciel (Novedi, 1984)

By Jean-Michel Charlier and Al Coutelis

- 25. Survol interdit (Novedi, 1988)

By Jean-Claude Laidin and Yvan Fernandez

- 26. Prisonniers des Serbes (Dargaud, 2002)
- 28. Le Vol 501 (Dargaud, 2012)

By Jean-Claude Laidin and Renaud Garreta

- 27. Opération Opium (Dargaud, 2005)

=== 2016 spin-off ===
Since 2016, a new series of Tanguy et Laverdure adventures has been published, with the full title Une aventure "Classic" de Tanguy et Laverdure. Similar to 'Buck Danny Classic', it traces the adventure of the two heroes in the past, depicting the roots of their success.

==== Matthieu Durand, Patrice Buendia and Jean-Michel Charlier ====
No.	Original French title	English title	Story arc	Publication date (album)
1)	Menace sur Mirage F1	Threat on Mirage F1	First album of two-part adventure	04/2016
2)	L'avion qui tuait ses pilotes	The plane that killed its pilots	Second album of two-part adventure	04/2017

==== Matthieu Durand, Hubert Cunin, Patrice Buendia and Ketty Formaggio ====
3)	Coup de feu dans les Alpes	Shots in the Alps	First album of two-part adventure	04/2019
4)	Le Pilote qui en savait trop	The pilot who knew too much	Second album of two-part adventure	2021 (tbc)

== Buck Danny crossovers ==
Tanguy et Laverdure crosses over several times with Buck Danny.

Buck is first shown on his own in the adventure Escadrille des Cigognes, talking with two Australian pilots in the canteen of a USAF base in Europe. Buck and his sidekicks also appear in some of the illustrations for the adventure Canon Bleu Ne Rèpond Plus. In this story the two French pilots meet Buck Danny and his US Navy squadron of F-8 Crusaders in the US base of Thule. Another tribute is also present at the end of Prisonniers Des Serbes where Erneste Laverdure is reading the Buck Danny album Les Agresseurs.

In the album Opération Opium, Laverdure is shown getting help from and greeting an American pilot clearly implied to be Buck Danny.

Buck, Tumbler and especially Tuckson play an important role in the album Rencontre De Trois Types. This adventure is placed at Nellis AFB during one of the periodical "Red Flag" exercises on which the Rafale and Mirage 2000 of French Air Force are involved. Buck Danny and his friends help the French aviators to bring a dangerous group of saboteurs to justice who are carrying out attacks against French Rafale fighters, helped by an accomplice journalist, to disqualify the aircraft in the aviation newspapers. In this adventure Lady X also appears, involved in the plot against the French aircraft.

In 2016 a special box set was published by Dupuis, Dargaud, and Zephyr, dedicated to Buck Danny and Tanguy et Laverdure. The box included the 'Buck Danny Classic' adventure Les Fantomes Du Soleil Levant, the 'Tanguy et Laverdure Classic' adventure Menace Sur Mirage F1 and a short black and white crossover (La Rencontre) between the two series placed in 1965, written and drawn by Zumbiehl, Buendia and Philippe.
