= The Unified Field =

Studio album by IAMX
- Released: 22 March 2013
- Recorded: 2012
- Genre: Indietronica; synthpop; dark cabaret; avant-pop
- Length: 48:22
- Producer: Chris Corner, Jim Abbiss

IAMX chronology
Volatile Times (2011)	The Unified Field (2013)	Metanoia (2015)

The Unified Field is the fifth studio album by IAMX. On 19 October 2012 the album title was officially announced on IAMX's PledgeMusic page. On 22 January 2013 the album cover and track listing were revealed. The first track, "I Come With Knives" was featured on the first episode of the ABC show How to Get Away with Murder, and the track "The Unified Field" was featured briefly on episode three, as well as "Walk With The Noise" on episode nine.

== Release ==
The song "The Unified Field / Quiet the Mind" was released as a double A-side to promote The Unified Field album. On 19 October the name of the release was confirmed on IAMX's PledgeMusic page. It was premiered on 3 December 2012.

The second single, "Come Home", was released on October 25, 2013. The black and white video for "Come Home", shot in Los Angeles, California, shows Chris Corner singing in a house before exiting and walking onto a balcony. This is interspersed with scenes of live band member Janine Gezang. It was shot in early 2013 while Chris was staying in the US.

The third single, "I Come With Knives", was released on 8 February 2013, premiering on Berlin-based radio station Flux FM. The video was premiered on 1 March. Shot in Joshua Tree, California, it shows Chris in dark clothes running around the barren landscape as live band members Janine Gezang and Sammi Doll dance about.

== Track listing ==
- All songs written by Chris Corner:

No.	Title	Length
1.	"I Come With Knives"	4:21
2.	"Sorrow"	4:42
3.	"The Unified Field"	4:11
4.	"The Adrenalin Room"	3:02
5.	"Quiet The Mind"	4:00
6.	"Under Atomic Skies"	3:47
7.	"Screams"	3:51
8.	"Come Home"	3:57
9.	"Animal Impulses"	3:54
10.	"Walk With The Noise"	4:00
11.	"Land Of Broken Promises"	4:42
12.	"Trials"	3:48

== Charts ==
Chart	Peak position
Austria	42
Belgium Ultratop (Wallonia)	59

=== Singles ===
"The Unified Field"
Chart (2012)	Peak position
German Alternative Charts (Deutsche Alternative Charts)	1
US Hot Single Sales	23
US Dance Single Sales	8
