= Disguises (Robots in Disguise album) =

Robots in Disguise

Studio album by Robots in Disguise
- Released: 2 December 2001
- Genres: Trip hop, electroclash
- Label: Recall
- Producer: Chris Corner

Robots in Disguise chronology
Mix Up Words and Sounds (2000)	Robots in Disguise (2001)	Get RID! (2005)

Professional ratings
Review scores
Source	Rating
AllMusic	link
PopMatters	(unfavourable) link

Disguises or Robots in Disguise is the eponymous debut album by English electropunk band Robots in Disguise.

== Track listing ==
All tracks written by Robots in Disguise.

1. "Boys" – 5:06
2. "Postcards from..." – 4:06
3. "DIY" – 5:55
4. "Bed Scenes" – 3:51
5. "Argument" – 6:00
6. "Hi-Fi" – 3:20
7. "Mnemonic" – 3:47
8. "Transformer" – 4:10
9. "50 Minutes" – 4:21
10. "What Junior Band Did Next" – 4:18
11. "Outdoors" - 4:59
12. "Cycle Song" – 3:51

== Personnel ==
Robots in Disguise

- Dee Plume - vocals, guitars
- Sue Denim - vocals, guitars

Additional musicians

- David Westlake – drum kit
- Paul Stone – drum kit

Production

- Chris Corner – record producer, mixer, engineering
- Noel Fielding – artwork

== Samples ==
- 'Argument' sampled Suicides' track: 'Ghost Rider' (1977)
- 'Transformer' sampled David Sylvian's track: 'Backwaters' (1984)
- 'Cycle Song' sampled Yello Magic Orchestra's track: 'Technopolis' (1979)

== Release history ==
Region	Date	Label	Format	Catalogue #
France	2001	Recall	CD	RECALL014
Europe	2001	Recall	CD	RECAL023
