= Your Joy Is My Low =

EP by IAMX
- Released: 2004
- Genre: Electropop

IAMX chronology
| Your Joy Is My Low (2004) | Kiss + Swallow (2004) |

Your Joy Is My Low is the debut EP by IAMX. It was released in 2004 in Austria, during IAMX's first tour.

The album was hand-numbered and limited to 222 copies.

== Track listing ==
1. "Your Joy Is My Low" 5:18
2. "You Stick It In Me" 4:20
3. "This Will Make You Love Again" 4:58
4. "I Like Pretending" 5:16
