= Everything Is Burning =

Album by IAMX

Everything Is Burning (Metanoia Addendum)

EP by IAMX
- Released: 2 September 2016
- Genre: Electronic rock; dark wave; synth-pop
- Length: 70:20
- Producer: Chris Corner

IAMX chronology
Metanoia (2015)	Everything Is Burning (Metanoia Addendum) (2016)	Unfall (2017)

Everything Is Burning (Metanoia Addendum) is an EP by IAMX released on 2 September 2016, serving as a companion piece to the band's sixth album, Metanoia, with seven previously unreleased tracks and nine remixes of Metanoia songs.

A demo of "Dead In This House" was featured on season 2, episode 8 and "Scars" was featured on season 3, episode 4 of the TV series How to Get Away with Murder.

== Track listing ==
- All songs written by Chris Corner.

Disc One
No.	Title	Length
1.	"Everything Is Burning"	4:23
2.	"Dead In This House"	4:49
3.	"Triggers"	4:19
4.	"Scars"	4:25
5.	"The Void"	4:58
6.	"Eternity"	4:23
7.	"Turning Crimson"	2:43

Disc Two
No.	Title	Length
1.	"North Star (Future Funk Squad Remix)"	5:27
2.	"Oh Cruel Darkness Embrace Me (Aesthetic Perfection Remix)"	4:11
3.	"North Star (Mr. Kitty Remix)"	4:31
4.	"Oh Cruel Darkness Embrace Me (SlikNik_CE Remix)"	6:43
5.	"Happiness (Gary Numan Remix)"	3:47
6.	"Look Outside (Marat Sad Remix)"	4:04
7.	"Oh Cruel Darkness Embrace Me (Single Mix)"	3:16
8.	"North Star (Addendum Mix)"	4:27
9.	"Happiness (Single Mix)"	3:46

== Charts ==
Chart (2016)	Peak position
Belgian Albums (Ultratop Wallonia)	101
