= Kingdom of Welcome Addiction =

Studio album by IAMX
- Released: 19 May 2009
- Recorded: 2008–2009
- Genres: Electronic rock, industrial rock, dark cabaret
- Length: 48:53
- Labels: Metropolis Records, 61Seconds
- Producer: Chris Corner

IAMX chronology
| Live in Warsaw (2008) | Kingdom of Welcome Addiction (2009) | Dogmatic Infidel Comedown OK (2010) |

Professional ratings
Review scores
| Source | Rating |
|---|---|
| AbsolutePunk.net | (80%) |
| Rock on Request | (favorable) |

Kingdom of Welcome Addiction is the third studio album by IAMX, released on 19 May 2009. Chris Corner described Kingdom of Welcome Addiction as being "like Disney World but with lipstick, cynicism and wit". It is the first IAMX album not to feature the vocals of Sue Denim, as well as being the first not to include any SP4 tracks.

The album was given to journalists to review but one journalist leaked it online in April and the album dispatch was also delayed. However, as an apology those who ordered it from Boutique IAMX were treated to an acoustic version of 'Running' which Chris filmed in a corridor of his own apartment building. This clip was later included on the CD-ROM of 'My Secret Friend'.

== Track listing ==
| No. | Title | Length |
|---|---|---|
| 1. | "Nature of Inviting" | 4:16 |
| 2. | "Kingdom of Welcome Addiction" | 4:35 |
| 3. | "Tear Garden" | 4:56 |
| 4. | "My Secret Friend (featuring Imogen Heap)*" | 4:06 |
| 5. | "An I for an I" | 3:56 |
| 6. | "I Am Terrified" | 4:58 |
| 7. | "Think of England" | 3:41 |
| 8. | "The Stupid, The Proud" | 4:28 |
| 9. | "You Can Be Happy" | 4:42 |
| 10. | "The Great Shipwreck of Life" | 4:17 |
| 11. | "Running" | 4:35 |

- Track 4 co-written by Imogen Heap

== Charts ==
| Chart | Peak position |
|---|---|
| Austria | 36 |
| Belgium Ultratop (Wallonia) | 28 |
