= Get RID! =

Studio album by Robots in Disguise
- Released: 15 February 2005
- Genre: Electroclash, electropunk
- Label: Recall; RECALL 050
- Producer: Chris Corner

Robots in Disguise chronology
Robots in Disguise (2001)	Get RID! (2005)	We're in the Music Biz (2008)

Alternative Cover
- Alternative Get RID! cover

Professional ratings
Review scores
Source	Rating
musicOMH	link
The Skinny	link
NME	8/10 stars
Disorder Magazine	8.5/10 stars

Get RID! is the second album by Robots in Disguise.

Tracks include the single "Turn It Up", a song composed mainly of references to other songs and, "La Nuit", sung entirely in French.

== Track listing ==
=== United Kingdom track listing ===
All tracks are written by Dee Plume and Sue Denim, except where noted

No.	Title	Writer(s)	Length
1.	"Turn It Up"		3:54
2.	"La Nuit"		4:03
3.	"The DJ's Got a Gun"		5:45
4.	"You Really Got Me"	Sue Denim; Dee Plume; Ray Davies	2:28
5.	"Girl"		3:18
6.	"She's a Colour Scientist"		2:56
7.	"Hot Gossip"		3:51
8.	"Mirror rorriM"		3:40
9.	"Voodoo"		3:38
10.	"The DJ's Got the Gun" (IAMX Shut Up You Dance Remix)"		5:48
11.	"Hot Gossip" (IAMX Sexual Helium Remix)"		3:34
Total length:			42:55

=== France track listing ===
1. "Girl" – 3:18
2. "She's a Colour Scientist" – 2:56
3. "Hot Gossip" – 3:51
4. "The DJ's Got a Gun" – 5:45
5. "Voodoo" – 3:38
6. "You Really Got Me" (Ray Davies) – 2:28
7. "Turn It Up" – 3:54
8. "Mirror rorriM" – 3:40
9. "La Nuit" – 4:03
