= Barry M =

British cosmetics company

Barry M Cosmetics
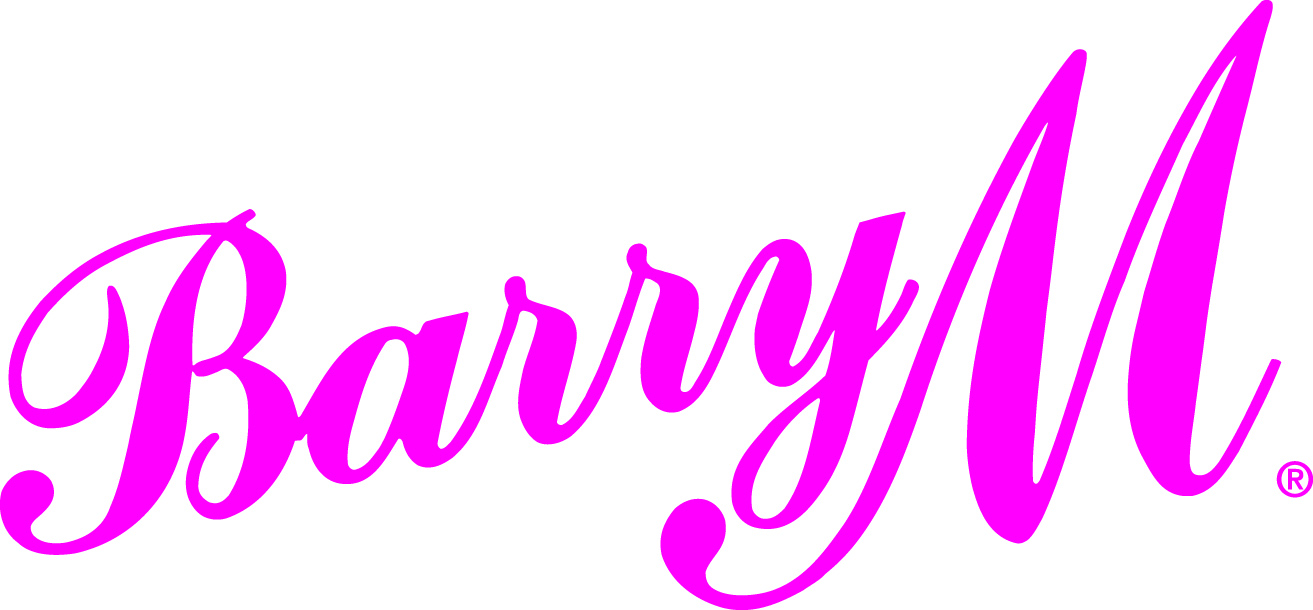
- Industry: Cosmetics
- Founded: 1982
- Founder: Barry Mero
- Headquarters: London, England
- Key people: Dean Mero, Managing Director
- Website: www.barrym.co.uk

Barry M is a British cruelty-free cosmetics company, specializing in on trend make-up and nail products. Based in Mill Hill East, London, it was founded by Barry Mero in 1982.

== History ==
Employing over 80 people in a 45,000 square foot production, distribution and warehouse facility in Mill Hill, the company generates an estimated $17m in annual sales supplying retailers such as Boots, ASOS, PYT, Superdrug and Tesco.

Barry Mero started his business life as a boy selling nail polishes on a stall in his mother's front garden. Years later he moved into retail with a shop in Ridley Road Market, London. Specializing in bold, vibrant make up colours, in 1982 he created his own brand – Barry M(ero). Moving to North London, to Mill Hill East, Barry M was adopted by leading UK High Street retailers and became well known for its on trend nail varnish and make up ranges including Dazzle Dust eye shadow, Crackle Effect Nail Paint, Genie (colour changing) Lip Paint and Matte Me Up Lip Kits.

Barry M products are manufactured in the UK and China, although they are not sold in mainland China, which requires animal testing on cosmetics. The company is listed as 'cruelty-free' in the Naturewatch Foundation's compassionate shopping guide and removed all animal by-products from their product range in 2021.

Barry Mero died in 2014 and the company is now headed-up by his son, Dean Mero, and his widow Maxine Mero.
