= Live in Warsaw (IAMX album) =

Live album by IAMX
- Released: 14 November 2008
- Recorded: 29 July 2007
- Genre: Electronic
- Label: 61seconds
- Producer: Chris Corner

IAMX chronology
| IAMIXED (2008) | Live in Warsaw (2008) | Kingdom of Welcome Addiction (2009) |

Professional ratings
Review scores
| Source | Rating |
|---|---|
| Teraz Rock | 3.5/5 stars |

Live in Warsaw is the first live album by IAMX, released on 14 November 2008 through record company 61seconds. The album was originally only to be released in Poland (under exclusive license to Vision Film); however, it was made available worldwide by an online retailer. The album is now out of print. It was available as a digital download. On 26 June 2020 the digital download version was re-released.

The performance was recorded on 29 July 2007 at the Agnieszka Osiecka Music Studio of Polish Radio, in front of a live audience for Polskie Radio Program III. The album was mixed in Berlin at IAMX2 studios.

All music is composed by Chris Corner, except where noted.

| No. | Title | Length |
|---|---|---|
| 1. | "The Alternative" | 5:45 |
| 2. | "Bring Me Back a Dog" | 3:45 |
| 3. | "The Negative Sex" | 3:23 |
| 4. | "President" | 4:31 |
| 5. | "Mercy" | 6:01 |
| 6. | "Lulled by Numbers*" | 4:19 |
| 7. | "Kiss and Swallow" | 5:27 |
| 8. | "Spit It Out" | 6:08 |
| 9. | "Song of Imaginary Beings*" | 5:11 |
| 10. | "Missile*" | 3:44 |
| 11. | "Your Joy Is My Low" | 6:03 |

- Lyrics on Tracks 6, 9 and 10 co-written/written by Ian Pickering.
- Lyrics on Track 9 co-written by Liam Howe.
