= Doris Duke (soul singer) =

American singer (1941–2019)

- Also known as: Doris Willingham; Doris Logan
- Born: Doris Curry; May 18, 1941; Sandersville, Georgia, U.S.
- Died: March 21, 2019 (aged 77) Newark, New Jersey, U.S.
- Genres: Deep soul, southern soul, R&B, gospel
- Occupation: Vocalist
- Years active: 1963–1981
- Labels: Jay-Boy Records, Hy-Monty Records, Kent Records, Atlantic Records, Canyon Records, Mankind Records, Contempo Records, SAM Records

Doris Willingham (née Curry, May 18, 1941 – March 21, 2019), known for much of her singing career as Doris Duke, was an American gospel and soul singer, best known for her 1969 album I'm a Loser.

== Biography ==
Duke was born in Sandersville, Georgia, and reportedly started singing with gospel groups including the Queen of Gospel Albertina Walker and The Caravans, though this has been questioned. By 1963 she was working in New York City on sessions and as a backing singer at the Apollo Theatre. She also recorded some demos for Motown Records, but none were ever released.

She married Johnathan Augustus "Gus" Willingham, an original member of The Cadillacs, and under her married name of Doris Willingham recorded her first single, "Running Away from Loneliness" in 1966. This release on Jay Boy Records was not a success, so she continued working as a session singer, mainly in Philadelphia. She also sang back-up on Nina Simone's live album, A Very Rare Evening, recorded in Germany in 1969.

In 1969, former Atlantic Records producer Jerry 'Swamp Dogg' Williams Jr. signed her as a solo artist, renaming her Doris Duke and recording the album I'm a Loser at the Capricorn studio in Macon, Georgia. The album was eventually issued on Canyon Records, and over the years became regarded, by Dave Godin and others, as one of the finest deep soul records of all time. The first single, "To the Other Woman (I'm the Other Woman)", reached no. 7 in the Billboard R&B chart and no. 50 on the pop chart in early 1970, and the follow-up "Feet Start Walking" also made the R&B chart, but success was cut short when the record company collapsed.

Duke recorded a second album, A Legend in Her Own Time, with Swamp Dogg, issued on the Mankind label in 1971. However, it was not commercially successful, and her career at one point became confused with that of "the real" Doris Duke, a white heiress, who began performing with a gospel choir in New Jersey. Having remarried, and using the name Doris Logan, she temporarily retired to bring up her young children, before undergoing another divorce. In 1973, Duke recorded unsuccessfully for Bob Shad's Mainstream label, before being signed to the British Contempo label in 1974. Her subsequent album Woman, recorded in London and arranged by Gerry Shury, received good reviews but few sales, and thereafter she retired from the music business.

An album called Funky Fox, issued on the Manhattan label in 1981, was credited to "Sister Doris Duke", although the tracks are in fact by other artists. However, Duke did make one further single, "I'll Make a Sweet Man (Out of You)", on the Beantown label in Boston, in 1981. Later efforts by music fans to rediscover Duke were fruitless. She was also sister to Jeraldine and Joyce Curry, who recorded as The Heartstoppers for the All Platinum label in the early 1970s.

A CD coupling I'm a Loser and A Legend in Her Own Time, with several non-album tracks, was released by Ace Records in 2005.

Doris Curry Willingham, known as Doris Duke, died aged 77 on March 21, 2019.
