= Sky Fighters =

Les Chevaliers du ciel
- French theatrical poster
- Directed by: Gérard Pirès
- Written by: Gilles Malençon
- Based on: Tanguy et Laverdure by Jean-Michel Charlier; Albert Uderzo
- Produced by: Eric Altmayer; Nicolas Altmayer; Christopher Granier-Deferre
- Starring: Benoît Magimel; Clovis Cornillac; Géraldine Pailhas; Alice Taglioni
- Distributed by: Pathé
- Release date: 15 October 2005
- Running time: 102 minutes
- Country: France
- Language: French
- Budget: €19,610,000

Les Chevaliers du ciel (Sky Fighters) is a 2005 French film directed by Gérard Pirès about two air force pilots preventing a terrorist attack on the Bastille Day celebrations in Paris. It is based on Tanguy et Laverdure, a comics series by Jean-Michel Charlier and Albert Uderzo (of Astérix fame) which was also made into a hugely successful TV series from 1967 to 1969, making the characters of Tanguy and Laverdure a part of popular Francophone culture. The film was advertised as "Top-gun new generation".

== Plot ==
At the Farnborough Airshow, a rogue group hijacks a Mirage 2000-10 after killing its pilot. French Air Force pilots Captain Antoine "Walk'n" Marchelli (Benoît Magimel) and Captain Sébastien "Fahrenheit" Vallois (Clovis Cornillac) are instructed to escort it back. The rogue pilot briefly hides under an Airbus A340 and then attempts to fire a missile at Vallois, so Marchelli is forced to destroy the stolen Mirage. The French "Special Missions" department, seeking to blackmail Marchelli into working for them, tampers with the video from Marchelli's gun camera. A subsequent court-martial finds Marchelli guilty of destroying the stolen Mirage without provocation and discharges him from the air force, prompting Vallois to resign as well.

Special Missions promises to have them reinstated if they fly a Cannonball run over hostile territory to the Horn of Africa to help sell the Mirage to an Asian customer. Marchelli and Vallois agree but are forced to land in hostile territory before completing the flight. They are captured by terrorists intent on stealing their planes. Marchelli and Vallois manage to escape in one of the jets, while the terrorists dismantle and make off with another.

The terrorists plan to use the stolen Mirage to shoot down a tanker aircraft over Paris during the Bastille Day celebrations. Marchelli and Vallois intercept the rogue Mirage and shoot it down over an unpopulated area.

== Cast ==
- Benoît Magimel as Capitaine Antoine "Walk'n" Marchelli
- Clovis Cornillac as Capitaine Sébastien "Fahrenheit" Vallois
- Géraldine Pailhas as Maelle Coste (PM defence adviser)
- Alice Taglioni as Capitaine Estelle "Pitbull" Kass
- Philippe Torreton as Bertrand
- Rey Reyes as Capitaine Leslie "Stardust" Hedget
- Peter Hudson as Général Buchanan
- Jean-Baptiste Puech as "iPod"
- Christophe Reymond as "Stan"
- Fiona Curzon as Mrs Redgrave
- Jean-Michel Tinivelli as Colonel Farje
- Frédéric van den Driessche as Général Hardouin
- Eric Poulain as Capitaine Klébér
- Pierre Poirot as De Séze
- Jean-Yves Chilot as Houdon
- Olivier Rabourdin as Général Président de la Commission
- Omar Berdouni as Aziz Al Zawhari
- Cédric Chevalme as "Bandit"
- Frédéric Cherboeuf as "Tala"
- Yannick Laurent as "Grizzly"
- Alexandre de Sèze as "Bunker"
- Axel Kiener as "L'Ankou"
- Simon Buret as "Jackpot"
- Mathieu Delarive as "One Eye"

== Filming ==
Les Chevaliers du Ciel was filmed in co-operation with the French Air Force. Initially the standard safety rules applied, but eventually the minimum allowed altitude was reduced to 3 m (10 ft) and the minimum distance between aircraft was reduced to 1 m (3 ft).

The filming of these flight sequences were mainly done from the air by Eric Magnan. To achieve this, one of the Mirage's external fuel tanks was modified to fit multiple cameras. A HD camera was considered for this purpose, but it did not fit in the fuel pod. Tracking shots were done from a hired Lear Jet.

Additionally, jet aircraft are not allowed to fly over Paris. As a result of this, all the Paris filming had to be done on the actual Bastille Day (14 July) for which the filming crew got special permission.

== Soundtrack ==
1. Chris Corner – "Attack 61" (02:51)
2. Chris Corner – "We Rise" (03:10)
3. Thirteen Senses – "Into The Fire" (03:36)
4. Chris Corner feat. Sue Denim – "Gonna Wanna" (02:52)
5. Chris Corner feat. D. Manix – "Sugar Jukebox" (02:10)
6. Chris Corner feat. Sue Denim – "Girl Talk" (02:08)
7. Ghinzu – "Cockpit Inferno" (03:50)
8. Chris Corner feat. Sue Denim – "You're The Conversation (I'm The Game)" (03:55)
9. Placebo – "The Crawl" (02:58)
10. Chris Corner – "The Clash" (03:47)
11. Chris Corner – "14th Of July" (01:47)
12. I Monster – "Heaven Is Inside You" (03:55)
13. Chris Corner – "You're The Conversation (I'm The Game)" Original Version (03:02)
