= Aux animaux =

Music project founded by Gözde Düzer

aux animaux is a music project founded on Christmas 2015 by musician Gözde Düzer in Stockholm, Sweden. Her style is dark wave and gothic music.

Gözde Düzer, originally from Istanbul, now resides in Stockholm and has also spent some months in Strasbourg. She plays bass guitar and theremin and describes her music as hauntwave. She performed opening acts for Hante. and Sólveig Matthildur. In April 2023, she embarked on a tour in Germany and the Netherlands with She Past Away.

The French project name aux animaux translates to "for the animals" and reflects the animal rights movement and veganism. Their video for Lost Souls features footage from the animal rights organization Djurrättsalliansen. In March 2023, she published the EP Operatione Daemonum as Melaina Chole.

== Discography ==
- Black Holes (EP, January 2018)
- The Unraveling (Single, September 2018)
- Phonophobia (Single, February 2019)
- Stockholm Synthrome (EP, April 2020)
- Haunted (Single, November 2021)
- The Hydesville Episode (Album, March 2022)
- Devil Inside (Single, September 2022)
- Hauntology (Album, December 2022)
- Lost Souls (Single, April 2023)
- Night (Single, July 2023)
- Body horror (Album, December 2023)
