= The Aeronauts (TV series) =

1960s French children's TV series

- Les Chevaliers du Ciel
- Genre: Children's television
- Written by: Jean-Michel Charlier
- Directed by: François Villiers
- Starring: Jacques Santi; Christian Marin
- Composer: Rick Jones
- Country of origin: France
- Original language: French
- No. of series: 3
- No. of episodes: 39

Production
- Running time: 25 minutes
- Production company: Office de Radiodiffusion Télévision Française

Original release
- Release: 16 September 1967 – 3 March 1970

Related
- Les Chevaliers du ciel

The Aeronauts was a French children's TV series about two fighter jet pilots in French Air Force, Michel Tanguy (Jacques Santi) and Ernest Laverdure (Christian Marin) and their adventures. It was based on a comic book series by Jean-Michel Charlier and Albert Uderzo titled Tanguy and Laverdure (Tanguy et Laverdure). The fighter aircraft featured were the Dassault Mystère IV and Dassault Mirage III.

Made by French production company Office de Radiodiffusion Télévision Française (ORTF) between 1967 and 1970, its original French title was Les chevaliers du ciel ("The Knights of the Sky").

The three seasons were originally filmed in colour but the first season was broadcast on French TV from September 1967 in black and white, as French television was only in black and white at the time. All three seasons were later released in colour when the series appeared in a 6-DVD box in the early 2000s. This 6-DVD set is now sold out and used copies fetch high prices.

It was dubbed into English, retitled The Aeronauts and shown by the BBC on UK children's TV, in Canada on the CBC, and in Australia on the ABC in the early 1970s. In 1972 Rick Jones released a single of the anglicised theme tune. In 1976 a version dubbed into Afrikaans and titled Mirage, was shown by the SABC in South Africa.

== Actors ==
- Jacques Santi as Michel Tanguy
- Christian Marin as Ernest Laverdure
- Michèle Girardon as Nicole
- Valéry Inkijinoff as Mr X.
- Ian Ireland as Stève Lester
- Gabriel Gascon as Louis Gagnon

== Series 1 ==
No.	Title	Original release date
1	"Episode 1"	16 September 1967
Michel Tanguy and Ernest Laverdue are sent to the Dijon airbase. When they arrive they end up half naked in front of the commanding officer. They also attract the attention of a mysterious Mr X who makes Tanguy a proposal.
2	"Episode 2"	23 September 1967
The head of the airbase receives a copy of a gambling debt signed by Tanguy. He may therefore be dismissed from the air force. Meanwhile there are problems with the oxygen supplies at high altitude.
3	"Episode 3"	30 September 1967
Two Canadian officers, Lester and Gagnon arrive at Dijon to fly the Mirage, but they are intercepted and replaced at the airport by two lookalikes.
4	"Episode 4"	7 October 1967
The Canadian officers are suspected as replacements by the captain, but is unable to raise the alarm.
5	"Episode 5"	14 October 1967
The captain has an accident caused by the spies who have infiltrated the base.
6	"Episode 6"	21 October 1967
A young pilot, Larrafieu joins the squadron. He is afraid due to having had an accident that killed his wingman. The commander tries to get him to resign.
7	"Episode 7"	28 October 1967
Tanguy tries to complete a mission instead of Larrafieu in bad weather. Together with Laverdure he helps Larrafieu regain his confidence.
8	"Episode 8"	4 November 1967
Laverdure has dinner with Nicole. Tanguy has to stay at the base. Meanwhile Mr X sends a spy plane to photograph the new French nuclear facility.
9	"Episode 9"	11 November 1967
10	"Episode 10"	18 November 1967
11	"Episode 11"	25 November 1967
12	"Episode 12"	2 December 1967
13	"Episode 13"	9 December 1967

== See also ==
- Sky Fighters, a 2005 French film with the same original comic.
