= Robots in Disguise =

English electropunk band

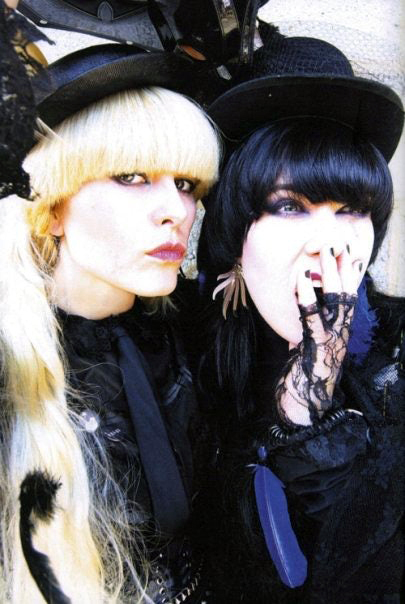
- Sue Denim & Dee Plume

Background information
- Origin: Liverpool, England
- Genres: Electropunk, indie pop, new rave, electroclash, electronic rock
- Years active: 2000–2011, 2019–present
- Labels: Recall (2001–2005); President (2006–present)
- Members: Sue Denim; Dee Plume

Robots in Disguise are an English electropunk band composed of Dee Plume (vocals and guitar), Sue Denim (vocals and bass) and a changing line-up of backing musicians. The group released four studio albums between 2000 and 2011.

== History ==
=== Formation and early years (2000) ===
Plume (Delia Gaitskell) and Denim (Suzanne Powell) met and formed the band when they were both students at the University of Liverpool. They recorded and released their first EP entitled Mix Up Words and Sounds through Splinter, produced by Chris Corner.

=== Robots in Disguise and Get RID! (2001–2005) ===
The band's eponymous debut studio album was released through Recall in 2001, produced by Chris Corner. Robots in Disguise featured the single "Boys". The cover for "Boys" featured a mimic of Roxy Music's Country Life. Robots in Disguise's second studio album, Get RID! was released in 2005 through Recall and Ben Prime. It featured the singles "Turn It Up" and "The DJ's Got a Gun".

=== We're in the Music Biz (2006–2008) ===
The band's third studio album, We're in the Music Biz, was released through President in 2008, and was again produced by Chris Corner. It featured the single "The Sex Has Made Me Stupid", as well as new single "The Tears". We're in the Music Biz has a deceivingly innocent looking album cover, with the girls appearing to wear shirts and ties when in fact they are topless and the "clothes" are simply body paint.

=== Wake Up! and Happiness v Sadness (2009–present) ===
The band recorded their fourth studio album in London in late 2009, but ran out of money before its completion. The band relied on fan pledges to financially support the project, and released the single "Wake Up" on 3 May 2010, which included a remix by Electrosexual & Scream Club.

"Wake Up!" was inspired by Barry M cosmetics, who financed a music video-cum-ad featuring "Robot Blue" lipstick and costuming.

With 138% of their pledge goal met by fans, the studio album was released on 11 July 2011.

=== Reunion ===
In 2019, they announced their reunion and an upcoming album.

== The Mighty Boosh ==
Dee and Sue appeared several times in the British Television series The Mighty Boosh as electro band members and goth girls. Dee Plume was dating Boosh co-creator Noel Fielding at that time. Robots in Disguise toured with The Mighty Boosh Live for their 2008–09 tour, performing in the after-shows. They also appeared at The Mighty Boosh festival on Saturday 5 July 2008 at the Hop Farm in Kent.

== Discography ==
=== Albums ===
- Robots in Disguise (2001)
- Get RID! (2005)
- We're in the Music Biz (2008) #24 UK Indie Albums
- Happiness V Sadness (2011)

=== Singles ===
- "Boys" (2001)
- "Arguments" (2002)
- "Bed Scenes" (2002)
- "Turn It Up" (2004) #141 UK Singles #14 UK Indie Singles #75 UK Physical Singles
- "Girl" (2005)
- "DJ's Got a Gun" (2005)
- "We're in the Music Biz" (2008) #70 UK Physical Singles
- "The Sex Has Made Me Stupid" (2008) #9 UK Indie Singles
- "The Tears" (2008)
- "Wake Up" (2010) #20 UK Indie Breakers
- "Chains" (2011)
