= Chris Corner =

English musician and producer (born 1974)

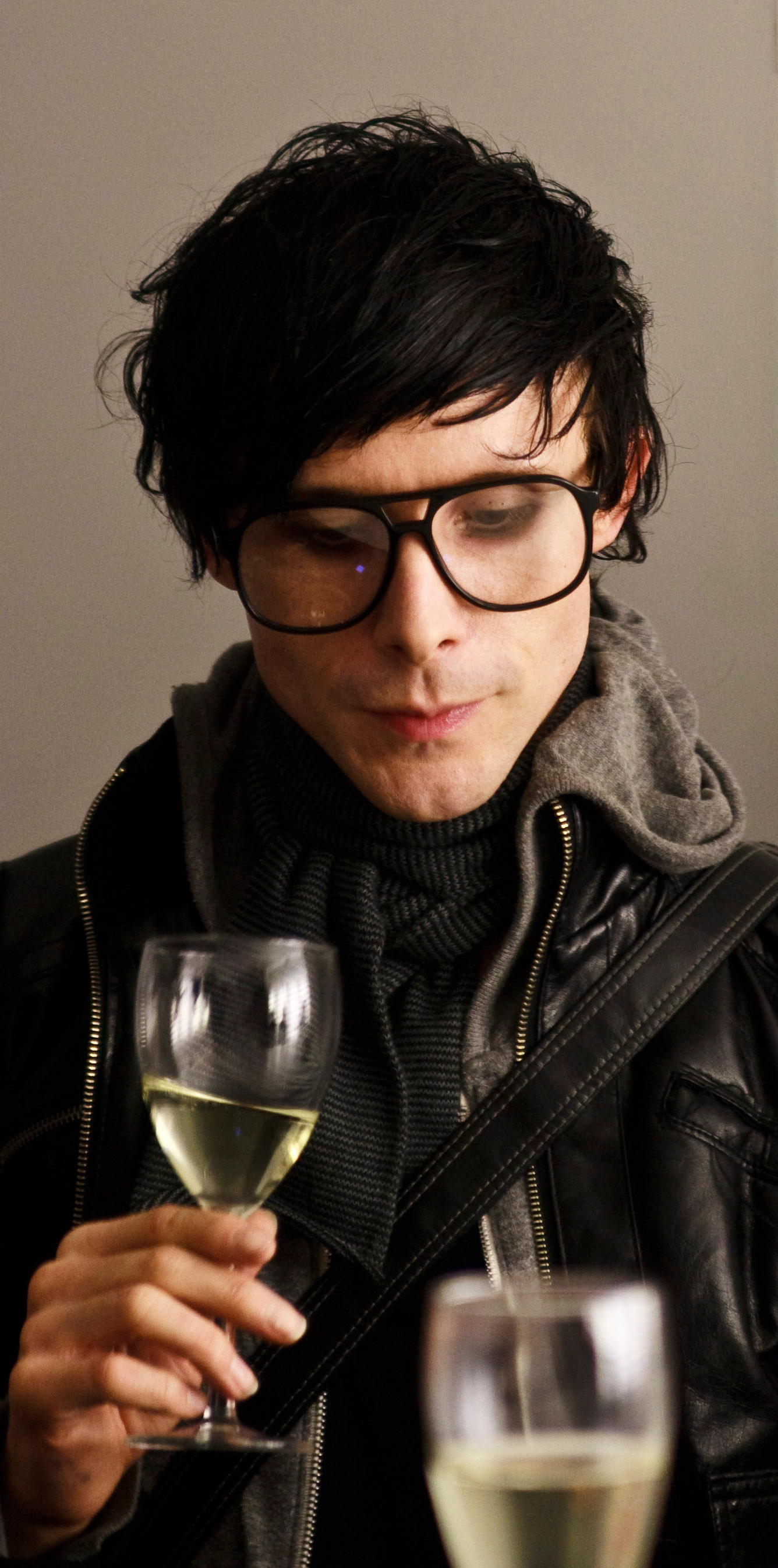
- Corner in October 2009

Background information
- Also known as: IAMX
- Born: Christopher Anthony Corner; 23 January 1974 (age 52); Middlesbrough, Yorkshire, England
- Genres: Electronic; trip hop; alternative rock
- Occupations: Singer-songwriter, producer, remixer
- Instruments: Vocals, guitar, piano, drums, bass, harpsichord, mandolin, theremin, vibraphone
- Member of: Sneaker Pimps; IAMX
- Website: iamxmusic.com

Christopher Anthony Corner (born 23 January 1974) is an English record producer, songwriter, multi-instrumentalist, singer and video artist. He was a founding member of the band Sneaker Pimps alongside Liam Howe, and is now active with his solo project IAMX.

To date, Chris Corner has released fifteen studio albums, four with Sneaker Pimps – Becoming X (1996), Splinter (1999), Bloodsport (2002) and Squaring the Circle (2021) and eleven as IAMX – Kiss and Swallow (2004), The Alternative (2006), Kingdom of Welcome Addiction (2009), Volatile Times (2011), The Unified Field, (2013) Metanoia (2015), Everything Is Burning (2016), Alive in New Light (2018), Fault Lines¹ (2023), and Fault Lines² (2024) and an acoustic rework album – Echo Echo (2020), as well as two experimental albums – Unfall (2017) and Machinate (2021) and two live albums – Live in Warsaw (2008) and Mile Deep Hollow Tour (2022). All albums under the IAMX moniker have been released independently and were written and produced solely by Corner with the exception of the fifth studio album The Unified Field, which was co-produced by Jim Abbiss, the experimental album Unfall which also features co-production and co-writing by Abbiss, and the acoustic album Echo Echo, which was co-produced by David Bottrill. Two more studio albums have been announced for release in the spring and fall of 2023.

Corner also composed and produced the soundtrack for the film Les Chevaliers du Ciel (2005), which included features from Sue Denim of Robots in Disguise and the band Placebo.

He has also directed, filmed, and edited music videos both for his own projects, IAMX and Sneaker Pimps, and for other musicians such as Gary Numan.

== UNFALL Productions ==
UNFALL (formerly creating under the name Orphic) was founded in 2021 by Chris Corner and Janine Gezang to be a service for fiercely independent musicians.

UNFALL is a record label, music video production company, and music photography service.

UNFALL Productions Music Videos
Year	Music Video	Artist	Director
2009	"My Secret Friend" Ft. Imogen Heap	IAMX	Chris Corner
2009	"I Am Terrified" (Alec Empire Remix)	IAMX	Chris Corner
2010	"Face To Face"	James Cook	Chris Corner
2011	"Ghosts Of Utopia"	IAMX	Chris Corner
2011	"Dance With Me"	IAMX	Chris Corner
2011	"End of Summer" Ft. IAMX	James Cook	Chris Corner
2013	"Quiet The Mind"	IAMX	Chris Corner / Danny Drysdale
2013	"Come Home"	IAMX	Chris Corner / Janine Gezang
2013	"Runaway"	Noblesse Oblige	Chris Corner
2013	"Lost Inspiration"	Dorian Gray	Chris Corner
2014	"Play Me"	Eleri	Chris Corner
2015	"Happiness"	IAMX	Chris Corner
2016	"North Star"	IAMX	Chris Corner
2016	"The Void"	IAMX	Chris Corner
2017	"My Name Is Ruin"	Gary Numan	Chris Corner
2018	"Mile Deep Hollow"	IAMX	Chris Corner
2018	"Stardust"	IAMX	Chris Corner
2020	"Surrender"	IAMX	Chris Corner
2021	"Intruder"	Gary Numan	Chris Corner
2021	"Saint And Liars"	Gary Numan	Chris Corner
2021	"Fighter"	Sneaker Pimps	Chris Corner
2021	"Alibis"	Sneaker Pimps	Chris Corner
2022	"Art Bleeds Money"	IAMX	Chris Corner
2023	"The X ID"	IAMX	Chris Corner

== Personal life ==
Born and raised in Middlesbrough, Corner moved to London in the mid-90s to pursue his education at Goldsmiths, University of London then at Queen Mary University of London before changing his focus to creating music full time. After Sneaker Pimps went on hiatus, he moved from London to Berlin in 2006, where he set up an IAMX studio for music and visual work until 2014.

However, after battling chronic insomnia and depression, IAMX left Berlin and moved to California, later stating: "I needed a big change of scenery. I had a few friends in Los Angeles and it seemed like the most relevant place for me, so I got on a boat and sailed over to the States." He now lives in a remote location in Southern California.

Corner is autistic.
