= The Wicker Man (film series) =

Two films directed by Robin Hardy

The Wicker Man is a series of three British horror films directed by Robin Hardy. The films are not directly linked to one another, but each deals with the theme of paganism in the modern world.

The 2006 American remake of The Wicker Man is not a part of this series, and Hardy dissociated himself from it.

== The Wicker Man (1973) ==
The Wicker Man was released in 1973. The film was directed by Robin Hardy and written by Anthony Shaffer, who based his screenplay loosely on the David Pinner novel Ritual.

The story follows a Scottish police officer, Sergeant Neil Howie (Edward Woodward), who visits the isolated island of Summerisle in the search for a missing girl named Rowan Morrison. The inhabitants of Summerisle all follow a form of Celtic paganism, which shocks and appalls the devoutly Christian sergeant. Howie discovers that the pagans, led by their laird, Lord Summerisle (Christopher Lee), are planning a virgin sacrifice in the hopes that it will appease the gods and restore their crops. Believing that Rowan Morrison will be sacrificed, Howie strives to rescue her, only to discover that her supposed disappearance was just a ploy to lure him to the island. The pagans imprison Howie in a wicker man and set it ablaze, burning him to death.

The Wicker Man is generally very highly regarded by critics. Film magazine Cinefantastique described it as "the Citizen Kane of Horror Movies", and in 2004 the magazine Total Film named The Wicker Man the sixth greatest British film of all time. It also won the 1978 Saturn Award for Best Horror Film. A scene from this film was #45 on Bravo's 100 Scariest Movie Moments.

== The Wicker Tree (2011) ==
In 2006, Robin Hardy published a follow-up novel to The Wicker Man storyline entitled Cowboys for Christ. It follows two young Americans, Beth and Steve, who leave Texas to spread Christianity in Tressock, Scotland. They are welcomed by Sir Lachlan Morrison and his wife, Delia Morrison; unbeknown to Beth and Steve, they are in grave danger from a Celtic pagan community in the village.

A film adaptation, entitled The Wicker Tree, was produced in 2009, with Hardy directing from his own screenplay. It had a film festival showing in 2011. A limited theatrical release occurred in January 2012 in the U.S., followed by a DVD release in April 2012.

Reception to The Wicker Tree was mixed. Early festival reviews were divided, Robin Hardy later acknowledged the polarized response, saying he was satisfied it was considered stronger than the 2006 remake, though he did not prefer it to his original film. On Rotten Tomatoes, it holds a low approval rating, with about 20% of critics responding positively.

== Wrath of the Gods (2026) ==
Main article about the 2026 film: Wrath of the Gods

== Wrath of the Gods (early development ideas) ==
Note: the description below refers to early development ideas for the film. The released version of Wrath of the Gods has a different story. It was directed by Justin Hardy and premiered in August 2026.

34 years after the first film, Hardy announced plans for a trilogy in a 2007 interview with The Guardian. Wrath of the Gods was a planned romantic black comedy film which would have been written and directed by Hardy. It was inspired by the Norse sagas, the last of which inspired theTwilight of the Gods, the final part of Richard Wagner's Ring Cycle, which this sequel sought to adapt to make this film. In the film, "the gods get their comeuppance."

=== Plot ===
The film was set to be about an "international entertainment company" that builds a theme park on ideas from Norse mythology, in two parts.

The protagonists are a young couple, Siegfried, the hero, and Brynne, a Brunhilde. Siegfried is handsome but "incredibly stupid", and who has been overtaken by his own self-interest and sporting ability. Brynne loves him despite his flaws and succeeds in teaching him to make love. Another of the film's key characters is Brynne's father, a chief of police. He has a tragic romance with a middle-aged woman, who has been accused of murder in Canada. Hardy stated that the chief of police will have to turn her in because he is an honourable man.

Hardy said that the film is ultimately about "what happens to the gods, not just to the people who are offering sacrifices to them. The gods themselves get sucked into the mêlée in the third film. I looked for a suitable carapace to put that in and the last act of the Ring cycle seems to work very well – and it allows me to mix full-blast Wagner."

The main antagonist of Wrath of the Gods is Mr Odin, a one-eyed Hollywood studio executive who decides to create a theme park based on the Norse sagas which originated in Iceland.

=== Production ===
Wrath of the Gods was originally intended to begin shooting in 2011, but was delayed. Filming was then intended to start in June or July 2012. The film was planned to be shot on 35mm film. Once the film's production was complete, Hardy planned for the sets to become a tourist attraction.

According to Hardy's 2011 casting announcements, Brynne would have been played by Icelandic actress Hatla Williams. Mr Odin would have been played by James Mapes, the actor who played Reverend Moriarty in Hardy's previous film, The Wicker Tree. Hardy intended to cast French actress Juliette Binoche as the murder suspect.

In a 2013 Q&A session at the University of Hertfordshire, at a special screening of The Wicker Man, Hardy confirmed that he intended to begin shooting in the middle of 2013.

In an interview the same year with ScreenDaily.com, ahead of the release of The Wicker Man: The Final Cut, Hardy stated that he was in the opening stages of financing the third film, and hoped to make it the following year.

=== Soundtrack ===
The film's score was written by Scottish composer Keith Easdale, and was inspired by Richard Wagner's compositions. Hardy wanted to find amusing ways to implement music in the film. Each of the characters will have their own theme: for example, Brynne will have a light melodic motif. Hardy compared this to Leonard Bernstein's work on West Side Story, where variations on a single melody were used to create many musical themes. Hardy was also inspired by the music of Shetland's Up Helly Aa fire festivals.

=== 2026 film ===
Since Hardy died in 2016, production was continued by his son, Justin Hardy, and completed just before Justin Hardy's death in 2026. It premiered at London's FrightFest on 28 August 2026.
