= Wicker man (disambiguation) =

A wicker man is a type of effigy.

The Wicker Man or Wickerman may refer to:

- The Wicker Man, a 1973 British horror film
  - The Wicker Man (film series), which includes this film
  - The Wicker Man (soundtrack), a soundtrack album from the 1973 film
- The Wicker Man (2006 film), an American remake of the 1973 film
- The Wicker Man (novel), a 1978 novel by Hardy & Shaffer
- The Wicker Man: The Official Story of the Film, 2023 book about the film
- "The Wicker Man" (song), a song by Iron Maiden
- "Wicker Man", a song by Bruce Dickinson from The Best of Bruce Dickinson
- "Wickerman", a song by Pulp from We Love Life
- Wickerman Festival, an annual rock and dance music event that takes place in Galloway, Scotland, UK
- Wicker Man (roller coaster), a wooden roller coaster at Alton Towers Resort, Staffordshire, UK

== See also ==
- Wickaman, drum and bass artist
- Burning Man (disambiguation)
