= Willow's Song =

Song originally from The Wicker Man

Song by Magnet

from the album The Wicker Man
- Recorded: 1973
- Genre: Psychedelic folk

"Willow's Song" is a ballad by American composer Paul Giovanni for the 1973 film The Wicker Man.

It is the best-known song from the film, and it is sometimes referred to as "The Wicker Man Song", although the film contains many other songs. The film tells the story of an upright Christian police officer investigating the disappearance of a young girl, the search for whom leads him to a remote Scottish isle inhabited by pagans. While staying at the Green Man Pub, Sergeant Howie (Edward Woodward) is roused from prayer by the landlord's daughter Willow, played by Britt Ekland, who sings the erotic ballad through the adjoining wall of their separate bedrooms while completely naked. The song is an attempt to seduce Howie by accentuating Willow's sensuality. The music is played by the band Magnet. According to the film's associate musical director Gary Carpenter, the screen version was sung by Rachel Verney (although some have believed that it was sung by the Scottish jazz singer Annie Ross). There are two different album versions of soundtrack. The 1998 version released by Trunk Records features the film version of the song. The 2002 version released by Silva Screen features an alternate recording in which Lesley Mackie (who played Daisy in the film) sang to the same backing tracks.

According to Paul Giovanni, "The idea for the song was completely original with me—there was no indication of what it was to be in the script except a couple of lines of absolute filth," sourced by screenwriter Anthony Shaffer from various anthologies of lyrics that would be appropriate to spring pagan festivals. "The main thing is in the rhythm, and we used all of the old twangy instruments in there". One couplet in the song is adapted from a poem by George Peele, part of his play The Old Wives' Tale (printed 1595). Another may be taken from a verse of the Elizabethan-period drinking song "Martin Said To His Man" (or may since have been added to it).

== Cover versions ==
The song has been covered several times, notably as "How Do", on the Sneaker Pimps' 1996 album, Becoming X. This version also appeared in an erotic scene in the 2006 horror film Hostel and the 1997 Spanish film Abre los Ojos.

Other covers include:

- A version by The Mock Turtles on their 1991 album Turtle Soup
- A version by the French pop band Autour de Lucie titled Island with alternative lyrics on the 1994 album L'Échappée belle
- A version by Nature and Organisation on the 1994 EP A Dozen Summers Against the World and the 1995 LP Beauty Reaps the Blood of Solitude with vocals by Rose McDowall.
- A version by Lush guitarist Emma Anderson's band Sing-Sing on their 2001 "Tegan" single
- A version by the British rock band Doves on their 2003 Lost Sides album
- A version by Faith and the Muse on their 2003 album The Burning Season
- A version by Seafood on the 2004 album As the Cry Flows
- A version by Isobel Campbell on her 2006 album Milkwhite Sheets
- A version by Anna Oxygen on her 2006 album This Is an Exercise
- A version by U.K indie dance group The Go! Team, appearing as a bonus track on their 2007 album Proof of Youth
- A version by Damh the Bard on his 2008 album The Cauldron Born, this time turning it into a duet and adding an evocative electronic rhythm
- Another version by Kelli Ali, formerly Kelli Dayton of the Sneaker Pimps, on her 2009 LP Butterfly
- A version by Daniel Licht for the 2012 Konami video game Silent Hill: Downpour
- A version by composer and artist Robert Reed for his 2014 E.P. Willow's Song, featuring Angharad Brinn on vocals
- A version can be heard in the 1998 anime Blue Gender in episode 06 "Relation"

In addition, a sample of the song was also used by British indie band Pulp on "Wickerman", from their 2001 album We Love Life.
