= The Wrath of the Gods =

The Wrath of the Gods may refer to:

- The Wrath of the Gods (1914 film), an American silent drama film
- Wrath of the Gods (2026 film), the third film in The Wicker Man series
- Wrath of the Gods, a 1994 adventure video game
- The Seven Deadly Sins: Wrath of the Gods, an anime television series

== See also ==
- Wrath of Gods, a 2006 documentary film
- Wrath of God (disambiguation)
