= The Wicker Man (soundtrack) =

Soundtrack album by Paul Giovanni and Magnet
- Released: 1998, 2002
- Recorded: 1973
- Genre: Contemporary folk; psychedelic folk; film score
- Length: 42:43 (1998 release), 39:41 (2002 release)
- Label: Trunk (1998 release), Silva Screen (2002 release)

The Wicker Man is the soundtrack to the 1973 film of the same name. Composed, arranged and recorded by Paul Giovanni and Magnet, it contains folk songs performed by characters in the film (including some by members of the cast). For example, Lesley Mackie, who plays the character of Daisy in the film, sings the opening song, and various others in the CD Soundtrack.

== Background and content ==
The songs were arranged to hint at a pre-Christian pagan European culture and vary between traditional songs, original Giovanni compositions and even nursery rhyme in "Baa, Baa, Black Sheep". Musicians forming the folk band in the film included Michael Cole (Bassoon and concertina) and Ian Cutler (Violin). This mix of songs contributes to the film's atmosphere, contrasting rabble-rousing songs that depict the island's community like "The Landlord's Daughter" and the child-sung "Maypole" with the sinister "Fire Leap" and the erotic "Willow's Song" before culminating in the islanders' rendition of the Middle English "Sumer Is Icumen In".

The opening music and "Corn Rigs" are arrangements of the Robert Burns ballads "The Highland Widow's Lament" and "Rigs O' Barley,” respectively. The instrumental parts of the score are based on traditional Scottish, Irish, and English tunes such as "Mirie it is while sumer ilast" the oldest surviving secular middle English song fragment, the "Struan Robertson's Rant" strathspey (plays while Sgt. Howie searches the ship for Rowan), the "Tenpenny Bit" jig (Plays while Lord Summerisle and MacGregor prepare for the festivities), and "Drowsy Maggie" reel (plays while Sgt. Howie searches a house for Rowan). "Chop Chop" is based on the nursery rhyme "Oranges and Lemons". "Procession" is an arrangement of the tune of the Child Ballad "Fause Foodrage". The psychedelic guitar solo which plays while Sgt. Howie is looking for Rowan, on the track "Searching for Rowan," is based on the melody of the Jacobite song "Hey, Johnnie Cope, are Ye Waking Yet?". Although some of the music is Scottish, and the film is set in the Hebrides, no traditional Scottish Gaelic numbers are featured.

== Release ==
The soundtrack was unavailable until a 1998 release on Trunk Records of a mono album dubbed from the music and effects tapes at Pinewood, from the shorter original cut of the film (hence missing the song "Gently Johnny"). It was not until 2002 that Silva Screen Records released a stereo version using cues from the tape held by Gary Carpenter, mixed with recordings from the first Trunk Records release. This release includes "Gently Johnny" and the missing lines from "Willow's Song".

A sheet music album of the soundtrack is also available, published by Summerisle Songs. Titled The Wicker Man Complete Piano Songbook, the book features all the songs and music from the film, arranged for piano, voice and guitar.

== Reception ==
Professional ratings
Review scores
Source	Rating
Allmusic	3.5/5 stars
BBC	favorable
Head Heritage	very favorable

Jason Nickey, reviewing the album for Allmusic picked "Gently Johnny", "Maypole" and "Willow's Song" as highlights. "Paul Giovanni, together with Magnet," he writes, "uses flutes, lyres, harmonicas, and guitars in a mixture of original and traditional material to create a mysterious and sinister world that comes to life apart from the film." Chris Jones wrote for BBC that just as the "cult" film "has now been rightly placed in the pantheon of great celluloid [...] its soundtrack deserves the same accolades." He notes that the "lilting (how come folk is always lilting?) melodies of numbers like Corn Rigs, Gently Johnny and Willow's Song are stuffed with a vaguely sinister eroticism, reflecting Woodward's unease as he scratches the tranquil surface of the island community to discover its sinister secret." "Maybe it takes a foreigner to get to the dark heart of much of our indigenous music," he concludes, "but it's a darkness suffused with beauty. Coupled to the original incidental music [...] this is a vital document of a time when the UK could still produce classic cinema. It's also a really fine album." TightPurpleShirt reviewed the 1998 version of the album for Head Heritage and called it an "incredible soundtrack", despite criticizing the exclusion of "Gently Johnny". He notes that the tracks "cover everything from traditional folk music, performed by MAGNET [...] Some very, very surreal sound effect sequences and some mildly psyche [sic] guitar work [.T]here is also a track called Hum which if extended across a whole CD could be marketed by any number of drone groups as their best album to date. The whole things a head fuk [sic] from start to finish and its glorious."

== Legacy ==
=== Influence ===
In 2013, Spin ranked the soundtrack 11th on their list of "40 Movie Soundtracks That Changed Alternative Music", writing: "The soundtrack from American songwriter Paul Giovanni reveled in the British folk idiom that bands like Pentangle had revitalized, weaving together standards as well as 'Baa Baa Black Sheep,' no doubt influencing freak-folkers like Devendra Banhart and Joanna Newsom. Yet for all its pastoral sounds, there was an uncanny eeriness lurking at the edges, a childlike innocence mixed with malice, anticipating the aesthetics of both Animal Collective and Broadcast."

In 2004 indie/folk/electronia experimenter Momus and French singer Anne Laplantine collaborated on an album of songs Summerisle Momus / Nick Currie said the project acknowledged "a tip of the hat there to The Wicker Man's Lord Summerisle" without being about the film or some kind of concept album, rather it featured an imagined folk-pop born of the tradition imagined by Magnet, as an alternative Scots culture let loose in global electronica like so many other folk musics, as such "The Wicker Man stands in relation to [the album] Summerisle", the film forming a "parallel world" for which he felt a great nostalgia, "‘Summerisle’ indulges a different nostalgia, the yearning of the wandering Scot for his homeland. A nation, a home, a golden age: these are inevitably fictions, so why not make them far-fetched and utopian fictions instead of limited, fact-smitten ones?".

=== Covers ===
Some of the songs (most notably "Willow's Song") have been covered by contemporary artists, such as the Nature and Organisation, Mediæval Bæbes, Doves, Faith and the Muse, Isobel Campbell and the Sneaker Pimps - whom also covered the song Johnny. A cover of "Fire Leap" was released as a single by Gazelle Twin with the NYX drone choir.

=== Tributes ===
A live performance of the soundtrack at the 30th annual Brosella Folk Festival in Brussels, on 8 July 2006, underlined the cult status of the film and its music. The organizers were looking for something to mark three decades of the festival and as such, for the final act of the evening, they assembled "The Wicker Band". This ensemble included many eminent performers from the thriving Flemish folk-rock scene, as well as the singer Jacqui McShee, founding member and continual reviver of the 1960s folk-jazz band Pentangle, and fellow ex-Pentangle member Danny Thompson. The band performed music from the film, plus a few selected songs from the folk and singer-songwriter repertoire that seemed to fit the mood before, shortly after midnight, the director's cut of the film was shown on a giant screen.

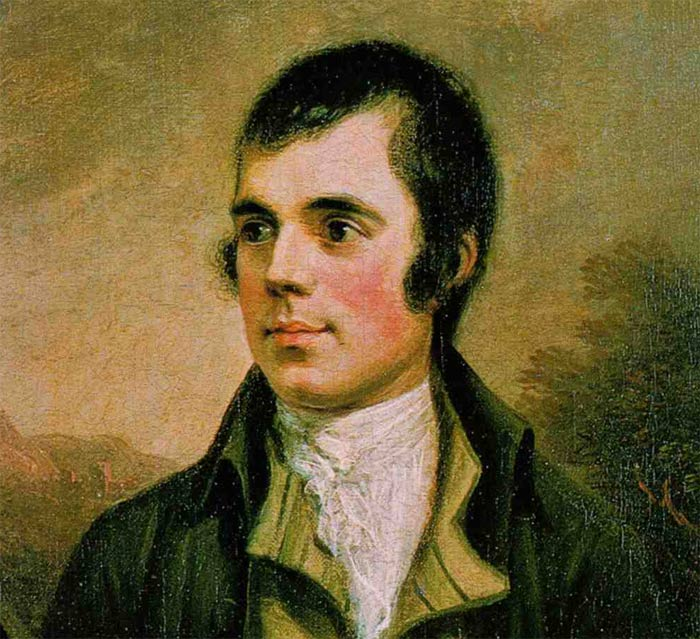
The original versions of Robert Burns's The Highland Widow's Lament (Main Title) and Rigs o' Barley (Corns Rig(g)s) can be found on Wikisource.

== Track listing ==
1998 Track listing

1. "The Wicker Man (Main Title)"
2. "Corn Riggs"
3. "Landlords Daughter"
4. "Festival Photos"
5. "Loving Couples"
6. "Willow's Song" - Vocals: Annie Ross
7. "Maypole Song"
8. "Beetle"
9. "Ruined Church Sequence"
10. "Corn Riggs" & "Fireleap"
11. "Fireleap (Reprise)"
12. "Graveyard Sequence" - "Tinker Of Rye"
13. "Tinker Of Rye (Part 2)"
14. "Festival"
15. "Masks"
16. "Hobby Horse & Tarring"
17. "Search 1 - Baa, Baa, Black Sheep"
18. "Search 2"
19. "Hand Of Glory"
20. "Procession"
21. "Chop Chop"
22. "Horn At Cave - Cave Chase"
23. "The Anointing"
24. "Hum"
25. "Approach"
26. "Summer Is A Coming In"
27. "The Wicker Man (End Title)"

2002 Track listing

1. "Corn Rigs"
2. "The Landlords Daughter"
3. "Gently Johnny"
4. "Maypole"
5. "Fire Leap"
6. "The Tinker Of Rye"
7. "Willow's Song"
8. "Procession"
9. "Chop Chop"
10. "Lullaby"
11. "Festival" / "Mirie It Is" / "Sumer Is A-Cumen In"
12. "Opening Music" / "Loving Couples" / "The Ruined Church"
13. "The Masks" / "The Hobby Horse"
14. "Searching For Rowan"
15. "Appointment With The Wicker Man"
16. "Sunset"
