= Justin Hardy (filmmaker) =

British filmmaker (1964–2026)

- Born: Justin Hardy; October 30, 1964
- Died: July 31, 2026 (aged 61)
- Occupations: Filmmaker, writer, producer, author

Justin Hardy (30 October 1964 – 31 July 2026) was a British filmmaker, screenwriter, producer, author, and academic known for his extensive work in historical television drama and documentaries. Over a three-decade career, his productions earned him nominations for both BAFTA and Emmy Awards. His prominent directorial credits include A Feast at Midnight (1994), Captian Webb (2015), The Relief of Belsen (2007), and Spanish Flu: The Forgotten Fallen (2009)

== Early life ==
The son of filmmaker Robin Hardy

In 2021, Dominic and Justin Hardy uncovered documents related to their father's film The Wicker Man, which prompted them to speak out about the damage the film had inflicted on the family. The half-brothers produced a documentary and published a book titled Children of the Wicker Man, in both they recounted their stories.

1979 The Wicker Man poster (US)

In 1974, following the commercial failure of The Wicker Man, Robin abandoned his wife Caroline and their children and moved to the US. After their father's abandonment, Caroline descended into alcoholism. Once a week, Justin and his sister Arabella would force their mother to detox, locking her in a room without booze. With her loan unpaid, Caroline was forced to sell the family house. Robin would later blamed his abandonment of the family on Caroline's alcoholism.

Justin, aged 11 at the time of his father's abandonment, wouldn't see his father again for 5 years, until he returned to the UK to watch his son act in a play. Justin was having his makeup removed when his father came backstage to reunite with him. Robin was clutching an article regarding how well The Wicker Man was doing in San Francisco during its 1979 west coast rerelease. Justin learned about the film's greater reception across universities and American film festivals.

Justin's mother Caroline died in 1984, unaware that the film which initially bombed and pulled their family apart would eventually become a cult success. "We knew that Dad had left her and that she had, relatively speaking, died of a broken heart..." Justin described.

== Death ==
Hardy died on July 31, 2026, at age 61 following a heart attack. He is survived by his wife Larissa, his four children, and siblings.

His passing came roughly 4 weeks before the premiere of his final film, Wrath of the Gods, which he co-wrote and directed with his brother Dominic. The film was planned to conclude the Wicker Man trilogy inspired by their late father's work.

== Filmography ==
Feature Films
Year	Title	Director	Writer	Producer	Notes
1988	Edvard	Yes	Yes		
1994	A Feast at Midnight	Yes	Yes		
2001	The Gentleman Thief	Yes	No		
2013	Love Me Till Monday	Yes	No		
2015	A Spell on You	Yes	Yes		
2015	The Green Park	Yes	No		
2015	Captain Webb	Yes	No		
2026	Wrath of the Gods	Yes	Yes		

== Bibliography ==
Non-fiction

- A Feast at Midnight (1996) (companion book to his debut feature film)
- A New Genre for Television? (2025)
- The Filmmaker as Historian (2025) (co-authored with Laurence Brockliss)
- Children of the Wicker Man (2026) (co-authored with Dominic Hardy)

Academic Papers

- The Problem of Truth in the Historical Docudrama (2011)
- The Drama-Documentary (2012)
- The Relief of Belsen (2014)
