= The Wicker Man (novel) =

1978 novel by Anthony Shaffer

- First edition
- Author: Robin Hardy and Anthony Shaffer
- Genre: Horror
- Publisher: Crown Publishers
- Publication date: May 1978
- Publication place: United Kingdom
- Pages: 216
- ISBN: 978-0-517-53259-1
- OCLC: 3397108

The Wicker Man is a 1978 horror novel written by Robin Hardy and Anthony Shaffer. It was based on the 1973 cult horror film The Wicker Man, directed by Hardy and written by Shaffer. The novel includes a foreword by Allan Brown. The film itself is loosely based on the 1967 novel Ritual by the actor and novelist David Pinner.

The novelisation was written primarily by Robin Hardy, the director of the film, but Anthony Shaffer is credited as co-author, as Hardy re-used much of Shaffer's dialogue verbatim. Hardy has said that he began writing the novel before Shaffer had even finished the screenplay. The first edition of The Wicker Man was printed in the US by Crown Publishers in May 1978. Hamlyn followed with the UK edition in October 1979. At the time these hardback editions were printed, the newly restored version of the Wicker Man film was being shown in the US.

== Plot ==
The Wicker Man novelization follows the plot of the film closely, but also expands upon the original story, incorporating additional backstory and new material that would have been unable to fit in the film. Some of the novel's scenes were originally shot for the film but were cut to reduce running time and have not been seen since the loss of the film negative. For example, the character of Lord Summerisle's gillie is restored, and the reader learns of Howie's interest in bird-watching.

The novelization reveals that Sergeant Neil Howie had originally attempted to become a priest, but that he was daunted by the prospect of preaching the minority faith of Episcopalianism in the staunchly Presbyterian Scottish Highlands. Howie's relationship with his fiancée, Mary Bannock, is explored in greater detail. Allan Brown writes that Howie's arguments with Lord Summerisle have more impact in the novel than they did in the film, as the casting of Christopher Lee, who is associated with many villainous roles, made it difficult for the film's audience to trust Lord Summerisle or consider his arguments seriously. In the novel, "the battle is more ambivalent, more unsettling – and, in the end, perhaps more in keeping with the treacherous moral landscape Shaffer initially envisioned."
