= Withered Murder =

1955 novel by Anthony and Peter Shaffer

First US edition

Withered Murder is the third of the collaborations of Anthony Shaffer and Peter Shaffer. The previous two books were published under the pseudonym Peter Antony while this one was published "by A. & P. Shaffer". It was first published by Gollancz in London in 1955 and then a year later in New York by Macmillan as part of their 'Cock Robin Mystery' imprint.

As in How Doth the Little Crocodile?, the story follows their eccentric detective Mr. Verity and his unique ways of solving murders. Again, as in How Doth The Little Crocodile? the detective's name was changed to Mr. Fathom in the US edition.

These books are now long out of print and copies in excellent condition can sell for high prices.

== Plot summary ==
NOTE: Mr Verity is known as Mr Fathom in the US edition.

Mr Verity is staying at the Barnacle Hotel at Crab Point, a small island off the Cornish coast. He is there to visit Captain Trelawney, who has two primitive terra-cotta statues from Corinth, which he would be interested in acquiring.

During his stay at the hotel, Mr Verity senses tension among some of the other guests and learns there has been a troubled history between them.

He observes them over dinner one evening and regards each of them carefully: the proprietress; the retired actress; the secretary; the ex-husband and a failed artist; a professor; a minister and his wife; a young journalist; a solicitor and an archaeologist and ancient historian.

Returning from a visit to the theatre on the mainland to see a production of Macbeth, Mr Verity and the other guests arrive at the Barnacle Hotel to discover the lifeless body of Celia Whitely, the retired actress. It's apparent she has been murdered in a gruesome attack.

Mr Verity takes charge and begins his investigation. He finds the old lady's Will, and questions each of the guests and staff in turn, his suspicions and accusations upsetting them in the process. He digs deeper into their backgrounds and finds they all have a motive for the murder in some form. When he goes to question Hilary Stanton, Celia Whitely's secretary, he finds her hanging from the ceiling. Nearby is a suicide note in which she confesses to killing Celia Whitely.

However, Mr Verity has suspicions about Hilary Stanton's death and her written confession. He gathers the guests to reveal an unexpected twist, which itself leads to another sudden, shocking death.
