= The Wicker Tree =

2011 British horror film

- Theatrical release poster
- Directed by: Robin Hardy
- Screenplay by: Robin Hardy
- Based on: Cowboys for Christ by Robin Hardy
- Produced by: Peter Snell; Peter Watson Wood
- Starring: Christopher Lee; Graham McTavish; Jacqueline Leonard; Henry Garrett; Honeysuckle Weeks; Clive Russell; Brittania Nicol
- Cinematography: Jan Pester
- Edited by: Sean Barton; Ray Lau
- Music by: John Scott
- Production companies: British Lion; Tressock Films
- Distributed by: Anchor Bay Films
- Release dates: 19 July 2011 (Fantasia); 27 August 2011 (United Kingdom)
- Running time: 90 minutes
- Country: United Kingdom
- Language: English
- Budget: $7.7 million

The Wicker Tree is a 2011 British horror film written and directed by Robin Hardy and starring Graham McTavish and Jacqueline Leonard. It is a standalone sequel to Hardy's 1973 film The Wicker Man and contains many direct parallels and allusions, and is intended as a companion piece which explores the same themes.

The film premiered at the Fantasia Festival in Montreal, Canada, July 2011 and was released on Blu-ray in the UK on 30 April 2012. It received generally negative reviews.

== Plot ==
Beth Boothby is a successful born-again evangelical pop singer from Texas. She and her fiancé Steve Thompson both wear purity rings and belong to a group known as the "Cowboys in Christ", who travel to "heathen areas" of the world to preach Christianity. The Reverend Moriarty sends them off to Glasgow, hoping to save some souls there. However, they are shocked at their very negative reception, and nobody accepts their pamphlets. They are approached by Sir Lachlan Morrison, the laird of the small village of Tressock in the Scottish Lowlands, and his wife Delia, who invite them back with them to preach. They actually intend them for a more central part in Tressock's May Day celebration.

The villagers of Tressock have become infertile after the construction of Sir Lachlan's nuclear power plant. While out riding a horse, Steve has sex with female villager Lolly, whom he finds bathing nude in a spring. Steve regrets his actions and wants to return home. During a flashback Sir Lachlan remembers a mentor from his youth. Meanwhile, a detective named Orlando is sent to Tressock, posing as the local police officer to secretly investigate reports of a pagan cult. After having sex with Lolly on multiple occasions, Orlando discovers that the people of the village worship the ancient Celtic goddess Sulis.

Beth and Steve decide to begin their preaching at Tressock's May Day celebrations. To impress the locals, they agree to become the local Queen of the May and the Laddie for the festival, not realising the consequences of this decision. Steve is chased by villagers on horseback as part of a ritual and is torn apart by them at its completion. Back in Sir Lachlan's house, the Morrisons' butler Beame attempts to sedate Beth to prepare her for her role as the May Queen. He had tried this the night before, but the spiked milk killed the Morrisons' cat. Beth attacks Beame and flees, but is captured in town. After discovering Steve's death, Beth confronts Sir Lachlan at the wicker tree. She pushes Lachlan into the structure and sets it on fire, killing him.

Beth tries to escape from Tressock with the help of one of the few children left in the village. She is captured and later killed. Her body is preserved and put on display in a room with the previous May Queens. Lolly gives birth to Steve's child and brings a new generation to Tressock for the first time in years. Delia prays to the setting sun for the gods to find more men to bring to Tressock to sire more children.

== Cast ==
- Graham McTavish as Sir Lachlan Morrison
- Jacqueline Leonard as Delia Morrison
- Brittania Nicol as Beth Boothby
- Henry Garrett as Steve Thompson
- Honeysuckle Weeks as Lolly
- Clive Russell as Beame
- Prue Clarke as Mary Miller
- Lesley Mackie as Daisy
- David Plimmer as Jack
- Keith Warwick as Donald Dee
- Christopher Lee as old gentleman
- Alessandro Conetta as Orlando
- Mark Williams as Paul
- Lorna Campbell as Arabella

== Production ==
=== Writing ===
In 2002, it was reported that Hardy was working on a film entitled The Riding of the Laddie, said to be in the same genre as The Wicker Man. Sean Astin had signed on as the male lead, with Christopher Lee, LeAnn Rimes and Vanessa Redgrave set to play major roles. Lee had passed the screenplay on to Astin while the two were working on the Lord of the Rings film trilogy. Ewan McGregor also read the script, and requested a cameo appearance. Of the story, Hardy stated, "It's about a certain kind of American innocence abroad featuring two young born-again Christians. They've made a pact not to have sex before marriage, and they come over here like the Mormons and preach door-to-door. It's a thriller; they get sucked into a dark world. We hope to start in September for a 2003 release." The film was to be shot on location near Glasgow and in Oklahoma.

Hardy was ultimately unable to secure funding, and the film was cancelled. He then adapted his screenplay into a novel, which was published as Cowboys for Christ. Hardy felt that writing the novel gave him a much clearer idea of what he wanted to do, and he eventually adapted the novel into the screenplay which was used for The Wicker Tree.

=== Casting ===
Originally, Hardy wrote the part of Sir Lachlan Morrison for Christopher Lee, who played Lord Summerisle in The Wicker Man. While filming the newest Hammer production The Resident in New Mexico, Lee injured his back when he tripped over power cables on set. Although very disappointed, Hardy gave the role intended for Lee to Graham McTavish, the actor who had originally been cast as Beame, the Morrisons' butler. Clive Russell plays Beame instead. Lee is still in the film, making a brief cameo appearance as the unnamed "Old Gentleman" who acts as Lachlan's mentor in a flashback. Robin Hardy has stated that fans of The Wicker Man will recognise this character as Lord Summerisle, but Lee himself has contradicted this, stating that they are two unrelated characters.

Joan Collins was originally set to play Lady Delia Morrison when Lee was to play Sir Lachlan Morrison. However, when Lee injured himself and was replaced by the much younger McTavish, Collins was similarly replaced with a younger actress, Jacqueline Leonard.

=== Filming ===
Filming was due to start in September 2007, but the film was delayed for financial reasons. It was later announced the film would shoot from April 2008 in Dumfries and Galloway. A week before the shoot, Dumfries and Galloway Council announced the filming had been stopped due to financial reasons. Filming eventually started in July 2009 in Edinburgh, Haddington; Gorebridge; Midlothian; and Dallas.

The Wicker Tree went through several title changes before its release, including The Riding of the Laddie, May Day, and Cowboys for Christ. The film had its premiere at the Fantasia Festival in Montreal in July 2011. Anchor Bay handled U.S. distribution, and the film received a limited release on 27 January 2012. It did not receive wide theatrical release, although it was released on Blu-ray in the UK in April 2012.

== Release ==
The film had a limited U.S. theatrical release in January 2012.

== Reception ==
Initial reviews from the premiere at the 2011 Fantasia festival were polarised. The Fangoria review was mildly positive with misgivings: "even as a black comedy, Wicker Tree can't match the impact of its predecessor. Still, for those fans of Wicker Man who can open their minds to viewing, as Monty Python used to put it, something completely different, the new movie can be appreciated as an entertaining variation on its themes." The Starburst review was negative, remarking that "sometimes cult films really should be left alone" and describing the film as "awful."

Variety wrote: "Neither remake nor sequel, Robin Hardy's companion piece to his legendary 1973 Wicker Man proves an altogether tamer piece of filmmaking, opting for humor rather than psychological horror. ... this rather likable journeyman pic seldom stumbles or soars, content to deliver midrange thrills and yuks."

In April 2012, Hardy discussed the film's mixed critical reception. "The New York Times’s reviewer said it wasn't as gritty as the original Wicker Man, but it's a thousand times better than the remake. I was quite happy with that." When asked whether he preferred The Wicker Tree to the original version of The Wicker Man, Hardy replied, "No, I really don't."

On the review aggregator website Rotten Tomatoes, 20% of 15 critics' reviews are positive, with an average rating of 3.8/10.

== Home media ==
Anchor Bay Entertainment released The Wicker Tree on Region 1 and Region 2 DVD and Blu-ray in April 2012.

== Wrath of the Gods ==
Hardy had proposed a third film in the Wicker Man film series, Wrath of the Gods, before his death on 1 July 2016. His son Justin directed the movie, and himself died shortly before its premiere in 2026.
