= Robin Hardy (film director) =

British film director and writer (1929–2016)

- Born: Robin St. Clair Rimington Hardy; 2 October 1929; Wimbledon, London, England
- Died: 1 July 2016 (aged 86); Reading, Berkshire, England
- Other name: R. S. Rimington
- Occupations: Film director, writer

Robin St. Clair Rimington Hardy (2 October 1929 – 1 July 2016) was an English author and film director. His most famous directorial work is The Wicker Man (1973), and his last project was a film adaptation of his novel Cowboys for Christ, which was retitled The Wicker Tree (2011).

== Early life ==
Hardy was born in Wimbledon, London, the son of Gordon Hardy, an officer of the Indian civil service, and Veronica Rimington.

He attended Bradfield College, but left at age 16 to study art in Paris.

== Career ==
Hardy began directing for the National Film Board of Canada and for the Esso World Theater strand on the PBS channel in the United States. Upon returning to London, he partnered with playwright and screenwriter Anthony Shaffer, the twin brother of Peter Shaffer. The two co-founded the advertising agency Hardy Shaffer Ferguson Avery, and collaborated in making the film which would be the most defining of his career, The Wicker Man (1973), a folk horror film starring Edward Woodward and Christopher Lee.

After the commercial failure of his film, Hardy abandoned his family and moved to the US in pursuit of Hollywood ambitions, but ended up working on commercials.

He later wrote Winnie, a musical about Winston Churchill, staged in London in 1988, wrote historical novels, and was involved in creating historical theme parks in the US. In addition to his novel Cowboys for Christ, Hardy published a novelization of The Wicker Man, as well as the novel The Education of Don Juan.

Hardy had expressed interest in producing a finale to his loose Wicker Man trilogy titled The Wrath of the Gods. In 2015, a crowdfunding campaign was set up to raise funds for the film's production, but ultimately fell short of its US$210,000 target.

== Family and personal life ==
In 2021, Dominic and Justin Hardy uncovered documents related to their father's film The Wicker Man, which prompted them to speak out about the damage the film had inflicted on the family. The half-brothers produced a documentary and published a book titled Children of the Wicker Man, in both they recounted their stories.

Robin Hardy had eight children with six different women: Moira Heston-Armstrong, Susan Fleming, Roseanne Hutchison, Elizabeth Richards, Caroline Burford, and Juliet Freeson.

Caroline Burford, being the daughter of a successful businessman, lent £27,000, equivalent to about £750,000 today, to produce The Wicker Man. In 1974, following the commercial failure of the film, Robin abandoned his wife Caroline and their children and moved to the US.

After Robin's abandonment, Caroline descended into alcoholism. Once a week, Justin and his sister Arabella would force their mother to detox, locking her in a room without booze. With her loan unpaid, Caroline was forced to sell the family house. Robin would later blamed his abandonment of the family on Caroline's alcoholism.

Justin, aged 11 at the time of his father's abandonment, wouldn't see his father again for 5 years, until he returned to the UK to watch his son act in a play. Justin recounted that as he was having his makeup removed when his father came backstage to greet him. Robin was clutching an article regarding how well The Wicker Man was doing in San Francisco during its 1979 west coast rerelease. Justin learned about the film's greater reception across universities and American film festivals.

Caroline Burford died in 1984, unaware that the film which initially bombed would eventually become a cult success. "We knew that Dad had left her and that she had, relatively speaking, died of a broken heart..." Justin described.

== Legacy ==
The Wicker Man has achieved a cult status among horror fans, and inspired a 2006 remake starring Nicolas Cage, though was received poorly and Hardy distanced himself from it.

== Death ==
Hardy died on 1 July 2016; he is survived by his fifth wife, Victoria Webster (married 2000), and seven children, Jeremy, St Clair, Zoë, Alexander, Dominic, Arabella, and Tom Hardy.

His eldest son Justin Hardy, who followed him into filmmaking, died of a heart attack on July 31, 2026, having just finished work on a sequel, titled Wrath of the Gods, to his father's most recognized work.

== Filmography ==
Year	Title	Director	Writer	Notes
1973	The Wicker Man	Yes	No	Written by Anthony Shaffer, based on David Pinner's 1967 novel Ritual.
1986	The Fantasist	Yes	Yes	Based on the 1983 novel Goosefoot by Irish author Patrick McGinley.
1989	The Bulldance	No	Yes	Also known as Forbidden Sun. Directed by Zelda Barron.
2011	The Wicker Tree	Yes	Yes	A spiritual successor to The Wicker Man, and based on Hardy's novel Cowboys for Christ.
2026	The Wrath of the Gods	No	Yes	Originally cancelled to lack of funding. Following Hardy's death, his children finished the project, which was released in 2026.

== Novels ==
- The Wicker Man (1978) (with Anthony Shaffer)
- Don Juan, 1921–1946 (1979)
- The Education of Don Juan (1980)
- Don Juan's New World: America 1945 (1985)
- Call of the Wendigo (1993)
- The Killer's Club (1994)
- Cowboys for Christ (2006) (aka The Wicker Tree)
- Peace Breaks Out (2017) (with Donough O'Brien)
