= Peter Shaffer =

English playwright and screenwriter (1926–2016)

Sir Peter Shaffer CBE
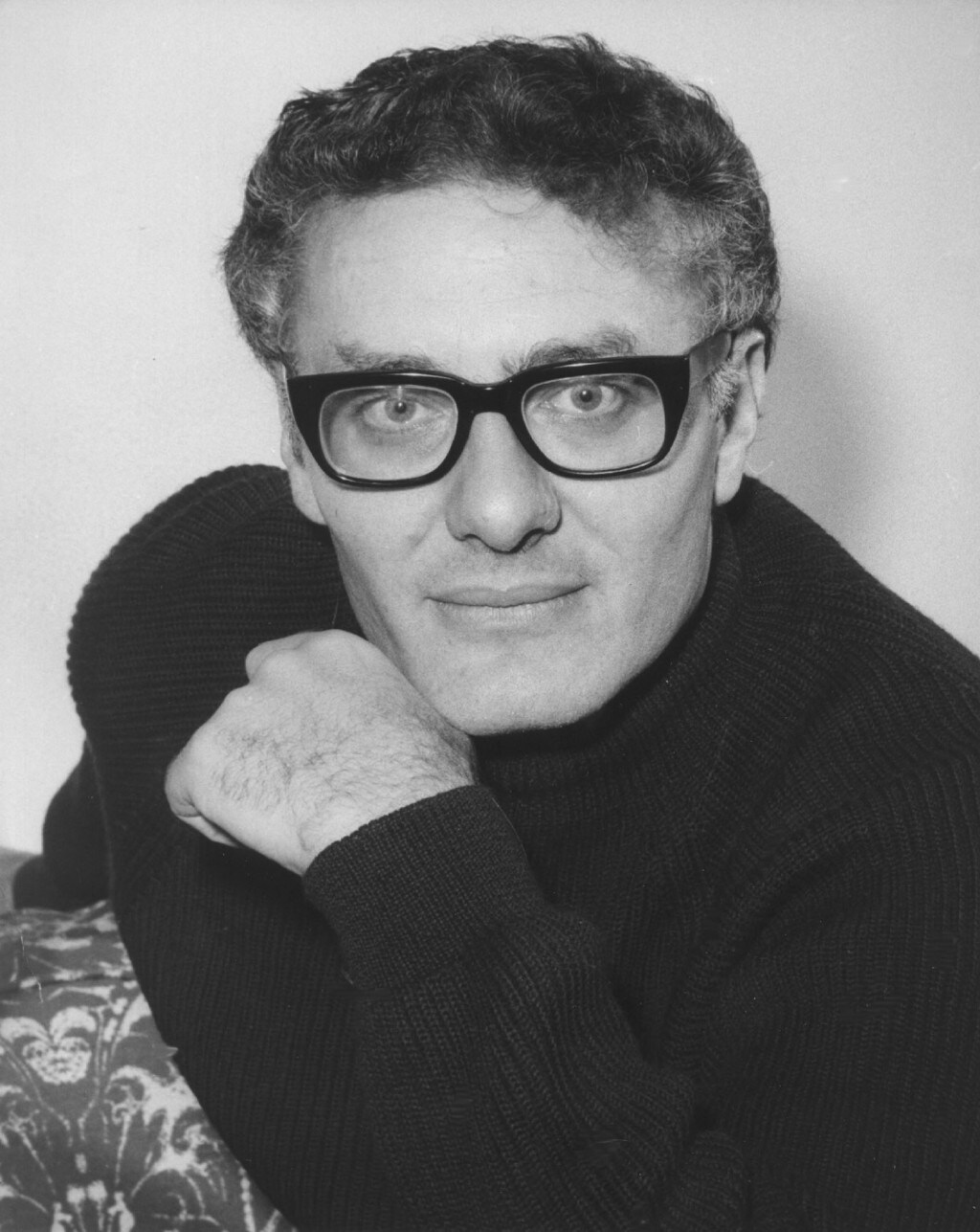
- Shaffer in 1966
- Born: Peter Levin Shaffer; 15 May 1926; Liverpool, England
- Died: 6 June 2016 (aged 90); Curraheen, County Cork, Ireland
- Resting place: Highgate Cemetery
- Education: Trinity College, Cambridge
- Occupations: Playwright; screenwriter; novelist
- Partner: Robert Leonard (d. 1990)
- Relatives: Anthony Shaffer (brother)

Sir Peter Levin Shaffer (15 May 1926 – 6 June 2016) was an English playwright, screenwriter, and novelist. His best-known works are the plays Equus (1973) and Amadeus (1979), both of which earned him the Tony Award for Best Play. They were later adapted for the screen by Shaffer himself in 1977 and 1984, respectively. He was nominated for an Academy Award for both screenplays, winning for Amadeus, which also earned him a Golden Globe Award. Shaffer also earned nominations for two BAFTA Awards and a Laurence Olivier Award.

== Life and career ==
=== Early years and education ===
Shaffer was born to a Jewish family in Liverpool, the son of Reka (née Fredman) and estate agent Jack Shaffer. He grew up in London and was the identical twin brother of fellow playwright Anthony Shaffer. They had another brother, Brian.

Shaffer was educated at the Hall School, Hampstead, and St Paul's School, London, and subsequently he gained a scholarship to Trinity College, Cambridge, to study history. He was a Bevin Boy coal miner during World War II, and took a number of jobs including bookstore clerk, and assistant at the New York Public Library, before discovering his dramatic talents.

=== Theatre ===
Shaffer's first play, The Salt Land (1955), was presented on ITV on 8 November 1955. Encouraged by this success, Shaffer continued to write and established his reputation as a playwright in 1958, with the production of Five Finger Exercise, which opened in London under the direction of John Gielgud and won the Evening Standard Drama Award. When Five Finger Exercise moved to New York City in 1959, it was equally well received and landed Shaffer the New York Drama Critics' Circle Award for Best Foreign Play.

Shaffer's next piece was a double bill, The Private Ear and The Public Eye, two plays each containing three characters and concerning aspects of love. They were presented in May 1962 at the Globe Theatre, and both starred Maggie Smith and Kenneth Williams. Smith won the Evening Standard Theatre Award for Best Leading Actress.

The National Theatre was established in 1963, and virtually all of Shaffer's subsequent work was done in its service. His canon contains a mix of philosophical dramas and satirical comedies. The Royal Hunt of the Sun (1964) presents the conquest and killing of the Inca ruler Atahuallpa by the conquistador Francisco Pizarro in Peru, while Black Comedy (1965) takes a humorous look at the antics of a group of characters feeling their way around a pitch-black room – although the stage is actually flooded with light.

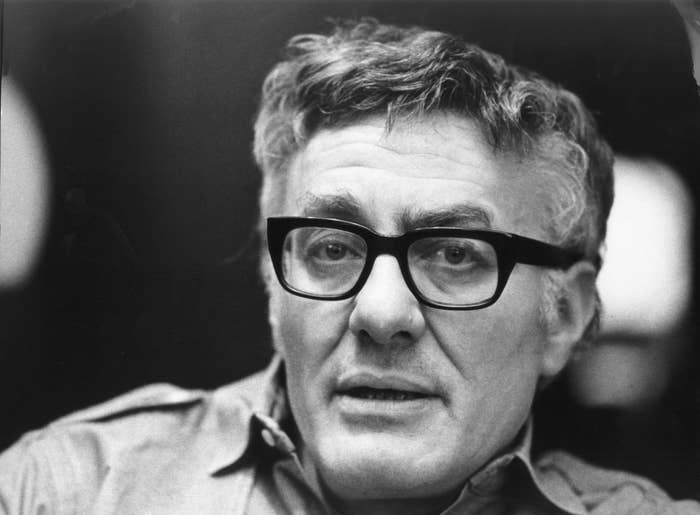
Shaffer in 1975

Equus (1973) won Shaffer the 1975 Tony Award for Best Play as well as the New York Drama Critics' Circle Award. A journey into the mind of a seventeen-year-old stableboy who had plunged a spike into the eyes of six horses, Equus ran for more than 1,000 performances on Broadway. It was revived by Massachusetts' Berkshire Theatre Festival in the summers of 2005 and 2007, by director Thea Sharrock at London's Gielgud Theatre in February 2007, and on Broadway (in the Sharrock staging) in September 2008. The latter production, which ran in New York City until February 2009, required the stableboy to appear naked; its star, Daniel Radcliffe, was still associated with the Harry Potter film series intended for general audiences, and this led to mild controversy.

Shaffer followed this success with Amadeus (1979) which won the Evening Standard Drama Award and the Theatre Critics' Award for the London production. This tells the story of Wolfgang Amadeus Mozart and court composer Antonio Salieri who, overcome with jealousy at hearing the "voice of God" coming from an "obscene child", sets out to destroy his rival. When the show moved to Broadway it won the 1981 Tony Award for Best Play and, like Equus, ran for more than a thousand performances.

After the success of Amadeus, Shaffer wrote the play Lettice and Lovage specifically for Dame Maggie Smith in 1986, for which he was nominated for another Tony Award and for which Smith eventually won the Tony Award for best actress after three nominations in 1990. Lettice and Lovage also enabled Margaret Tyzack to win the award for best featured actress, and the production was nominated for best direction of a play, at the 1990 Tony Awards.

=== Screen work ===
Several of Shaffer's plays have been adapted to film, including Five Finger Exercise (1962); The Royal Hunt of the Sun (1969); The Public Eye (1962), from which he adapted the 1972 film Follow Me! (1972); Equus (1977); and Amadeus (1984), which won eight Academy Awards, including Best Picture.

For writing the screenplay for Equus, Shaffer was nominated for an Academy Award for his adapted screenplay, but the award went to Alvin Sargent, who wrote the screenplay for Julia. For writing the screenplay for Amadeus, Shaffer was awarded a Golden Globe Award and an Academy Award.

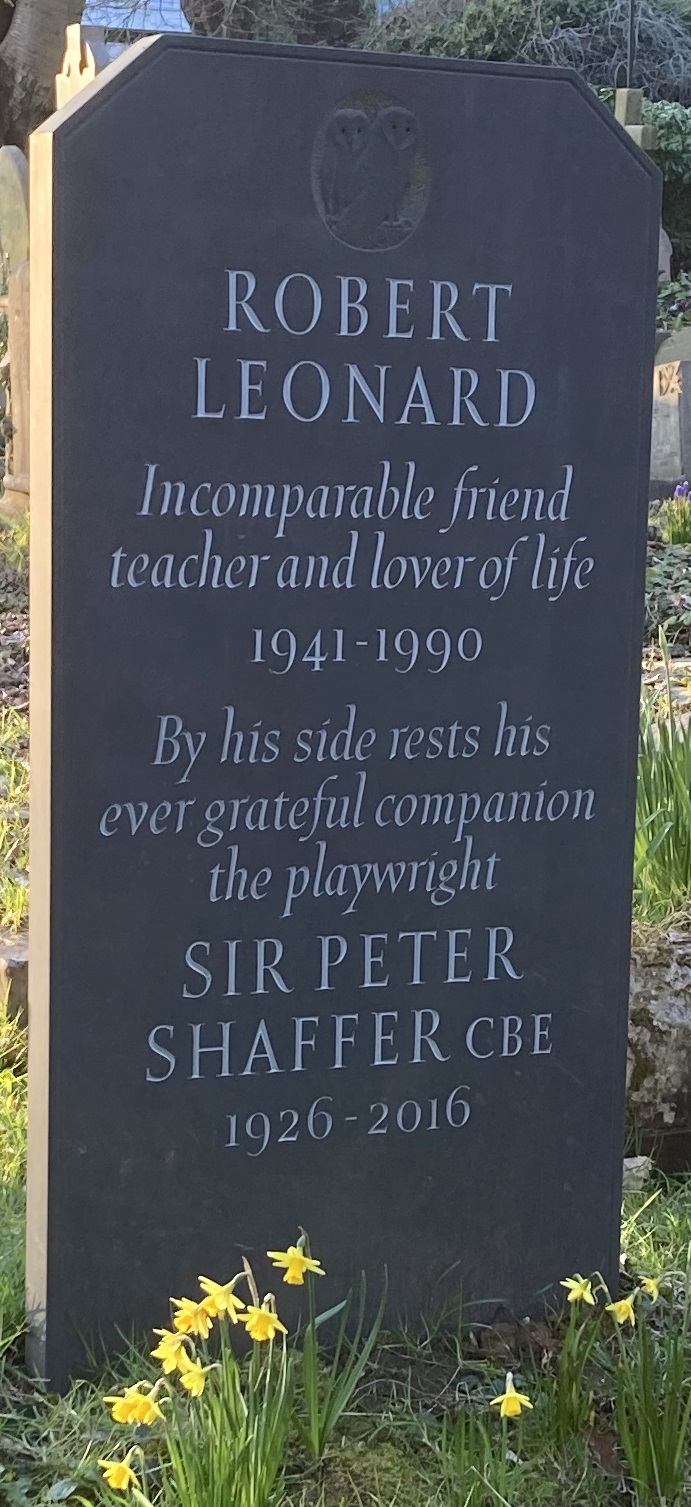
Grave of Robert Leonard and Peter Shaffer in Highgate Cemetery

=== Personal life and death ===
Shaffer was gay. In the 1970s, he was in a relationship with Paul Giovanni, musician and composer of The Wicker Man. His later partner, New York-based voice teacher Robert Leonard, died in 1990 at the age of 49. Peter Shaffer's final relationship was with the drama and music teacher Kevin Shancady. Shaffer was given a Memorial Tribute on Broadway in 2017. He lived in Manhattan from the 1970s onward.

While on a trip to Ireland shortly after his 90th birthday, Shaffer died on 6 June 2016 at a hospice facility in Curraheen, County Cork. Leonard and Shaffer are buried together in the east side of Highgate Cemetery.

== Works ==
=== Plays ===
- Five Finger Exercise (1958)
- The Private Ear (1962)
- The Public Eye (1962)
- The Royal Hunt of the Sun (1964 but completed by 1958), a theatre piece on Atahualpa, the last emperor of the Tahuantinsuyu
- Black Comedy (1965)
- The White Liars (1967)
- Equus (1973)
- Shrivings (1974)
- Amadeus (1979)
- Yonadab (1985)
- Lettice and Lovage (1987)
- The Gift of the Gorgon (1992)

=== Detective novels co-written as Peter Antony ===
Shaffer co-wrote three detective novels with his brother Anthony Shaffer under the pseudonym Peter Antony.

- The Woman in the Wardrobe (1951)
- How Doth the Little Crocodile? (1952)
- Withered Murder (1955)

=== Radio and Television ===
- The Salt Land (television, 1955)
- Whom Do I Have The Honour Of Addressing? (radio play, 1990)

== Awards and honours ==
Award	Year	Category	Work	Result
Academy Awards	1978	Best Adapted Screenplay	Equus	Nominated
Academy Awards	1985	Best Adapted Screenplay	Amadeus	Won
British Academy Film Awards	1978	Best Screenplay	Equus	Nominated
British Academy Film Awards	1986	Best Adapted Screenplay	Amadeus	Nominated
Golden Globe Awards	1985	Best Screenplay – Motion Picture	Amadeus	Won
Tony Awards	1967	Best Play	Black Comedy	Nominated
Tony Awards	1975	Best Play	Equus	Won
Tony Awards	1981	Best Play	Amadeus	Won
Tony Awards	1990	Best Play	Lettice and Lovage	Nominated
Laurence Olivier Awards	1987	Play of the Year	Lettice and Lovage	Nominated

In 1989 the Hamburg-based Alfred Toepfer Foundation awarded Shaffer its annual Shakespeare Prize in recognition of his life's work. In 1993, he was awarded an Honorary Degree (Doctor of Letters) by the University of Bath.

Shaffer's play, Five Finger Exercise won the Evening Standard Drama Award when it premiered in London and then won the New York Drama Critics' Circle Award for Best Foreign Play when it moved to New York City.

Shaffer's play, Equus won the Tony Award for Best Play and the New York Drama Critics' Circle that year as well. His screenplay adaptation of the play was nominated for a Best Adapted Screenplay Oscar in 1978.

Shaffer's play Amadeus won the Evening Standard Drama Award and the Theatre Critics' Award for its initial London production. Upon moving to Broadway, Amadeus won the 1981 Tony Award for Best Play. His screenplay adaptation of the play won the Best Adapted Screenplay Oscar as well as the Golden Globe for Best Screenplay in 1984.

Shaffer's play Lettice and Lovage was nominated for another Tony Award, and for her performance in it, Dame Maggie Smith won the Tony Award for Best Leading Actress after three nominations in 1990. Lettice and Lovage also won Best Featured Actress for Margaret Tyzack and was nominated for Best Direction of a Play at the 1990's ceremony .

Shaffer was appointed a CBE in 1987 and named Knight Bachelor in the 2001 New Year's Honours. In 2007, he was inducted into the American Theater Hall of Fame.

== See also ==
- List of British playwrights since 1950
- List of Academy Award winners and nominees from Great Britain
