= Wrath of God =

Wrath of God may refer to:

- Suffering construed as divine retribution
- Operation Wrath of God, an Israeli Mossad covert operation, to eliminate all the perpetrators of the 1972 Munich massacre
- The Wrath of God, a 1972 Western film
- Aguirre, the Wrath of God, a 1972 epic historical drama film
- "Wrath of God" (song), a 2012 song by Crystal Castles

== See also ==
- Wrath of Gods, a 2006 documentary film
- The Wrath of the Gods (disambiguation)
