= Burning Man (disambiguation) =

Burning Man is an event held annually in the western United States at Black Rock City.

Burning Man may also refer to:

- "Burning Man" (song), a song by Dierks Bentley featuring Brothers Osborne
- "Burning Man", a song by Andrew Watt featuring Post Malone
- Burning Man (film), a 2011 film
- "The Burning Man" (The Twilight Zone), a TV episode
- "The Burning Man" (Inspector George Gently), a TV episode
- Another name for the Wicker man (disambiguation)
