= The Wicker Man (2006 film) =

2006 film

- Theatrical release poster
- Directed by: Neil LaBute
- Screenplay by: Neil LaBute
- Based on: The Wicker Man by Anthony Shaffer (Note: In turn adapted from the novel Ritual (1967) by David Pinner.)
- Produced by: Nicolas Cage; Boaz Davidson; Randall Emmett; Norm Golightly; Avi Lerner; John Thompson
- Starring: Nicolas Cage; Ellen Burstyn; Kate Beahan; Frances Conroy; Molly Parker; Leelee Sobieski; Diane Delano
- Cinematography: Paul Sarossy
- Edited by: Joel Plotch
- Music by: Angelo Badalamenti
- Production companies: Alcon Entertainment; Millennium Films; Emmett Furla Films; Saturn Films
- Distributed by: Warner Bros. Pictures
- Release dates: September 1, 2006 (United States); November 2, 2006 (Germany)
- Running time: 102 minutes
- Countries: United States; Germany
- Language: English
- Budget: $40 million
- Box office: $38.8 million

The Wicker Man is a 2006 folk horror film written and directed by Neil LaBute and starring Nicolas Cage, Ellen Burstyn, Kate Beahan, Frances Conroy, Molly Parker, Leelee Sobieski, and Diane Delano. It is a remake and reimagining of the 1973 British film of the same name, and draws very loosely from David Pinner's 1967 novel Ritual. The film concerns police officer Edward Malus, whose ex-fiancée Willow Woodward informs him that her daughter Rowan has disappeared and asks for his help in her search. When he arrives at the island in the Pacific Northwest where Rowan was last seen, he suspects something sinister about the neo-pagans who live there.

Produced on a budget of $40 million, The Wicker Man was shot on location in British Columbia, Canada, largely on Bowen Island, in the summer of 2005. Released by Warner Bros. Pictures on September 1, 2006, the film was a box-office bomb, grossing $38.8 million. It received largely negative reviews from film critics. The film earned five nominations at the 27th Golden Raspberry Awards, though Paul Sarossy did win the award for Best Cinematography from the Canadian Society of Cinematographers.

== Plot ==
Policeman Edward Malus gets news from his ex-fiancée, Willow Woodward, that her daughter Rowan is missing. He travels to an island in the Puget Sound off the coast of Washington where a group of neo-pagans live. They are led by Sister Summersisle, an elderly woman who represents the goddess they worship. Sister Summersisle explains to Edward that her ancestors had left England to avoid persecution, only to settle near Salem and find renewed persecution in the Salem witch trials before arriving on the island. Sister Summersisle explains that their population is predominantly female, as they choose the strongest stock—evading Edward's concern about the birth of unwanted males. The island's economy relies on the production of local honey, which Edward learns has declined recently.

Edward asks the villagers about Rowan, but they give him evasive answers. He later sees two men carrying a large bag that appears to be dripping blood and finds a fresh, unmarked grave in the churchyard. The grave contains only a burned doll, but Edward finds Rowan's sweater in the churchyard. At the village school, teacher Sister Rose tries to prevent Edward from seeing the class register. When he finds that Rowan's name is crossed out, he becomes outraged at Rose and her class. After a short discussion of the islanders' view of death, she explains that capital punishment is used to enforce their laws. Edward asks how Rowan died and Sister Rose tells him, "She'll burn to death." When Edward catches the tense she used, Sister Rose quickly corrects herself: "She burned to death." When Edward questions Willow about the grave, she reveals that Rowan is their daughter together. On the day of the fertility rite, Edward frantically searches the village for Rowan. Disguised in a bear suit, he joins the parade led by Sister Summersisle, which ends at the festival site.

Rowan is tied to a large tree, about to be burned. Edward rescues her and they run away through the woods, but Rowan leads him back to Sister Summersisle. Sister Summersisle thanks Rowan for her help, and Edward realizes that the search for Rowan was a setup the whole time. Willow, known on the island as Sister Willow, is the daughter of Sister Summersisle and chose Edward as a human sacrifice to restore the island's honey production (after Edward deliberately destroyed the beehives in their crop earlier). They carry him to an enormous wicker man where he is hoisted high above the ground and shut inside. Rowan sets fire to the wicker man, and Edward is sacrificed in a giant blaze amid his screams.

Six months later, Sisters Willow and Honey go to a Seattle bar and meet two policemen, one of whom graduated from the academy. Willow and Honey volunteer to go home with them.

== Cast ==
- Nicolas Cage as Edward Malus, a police officer.
- Ellen Burstyn as Sister Summersisle, leader of the cult and Sister Willow's mother.
- Kate Beahan as Sister Willow Woodward, Edward's ex-fiancée.
- Leelee Sobieski as Sister Honey, one of the cult's leaders.
- Frances Conroy as Dr. T.H. Moss
- Molly Parker as Sister Rose / Sister Thorn
- Diane Delano as Sister Beech
- Mary Black as Sister Oak
- Christine Willes as Sister Violet
- Erika Shaye Gair as Rowan Woodward, Willow's daughter
- Michael Wiseman as Officer Pete
- David Purvis as Ivy
- Sophie Hough as Daisy
- Sam Velasquez as "Whitey"
- Aaron Eckhart as Truck Stop Patron
- George A. Murphy as Virginity Protector
- Matthew Walker as Sea Plane Pilot
- James Franco as Police Officer in a Bar
- Jason Ritter as Bar Guy #2
- Christa Campbell as Truck Stop Waitress

== Production ==
=== Development ===
Universal Pictures had been planning a remake of the 1973 film of the same name since the 1990s. The British film had been in the licensing library of Canal+, which was optioned by producer JoAnne Sellar to Universal. In March 2002 it was revealed that Neil LaBute was writing and directing The Wicker Man for Universal and Nicolas Cage's production company Saturn Films. Around the same time, the original film's director Robin Hardy and star Christopher Lee were preparing a semi-remake of their 1973 film, titled The Riding of the Laddie, with Vanessa Redgrave and Lee's Lord of the Rings co-star Sean Astin attached. Hardy stated Lee would not play the villain as he did in the original Wicker Man, but instead a door-to-door born again Christian preacher who comes to Scotland along with his wife (Redgrave) as they are introduced to the neo-pagan cult. Hardy hoped for filming to begin in Glasgow, Scotland in 2003, but The Riding of the Laddie would not materialize until years later, when it had undergone many changes to become the film The Wicker Tree. Universal's remake with LaBute moved forward, which changed the Scots setting to contemporary America. The remake rights eventually moved from Universal to Millennium Films.

=== Filming ===
Principal photography began in the Vancouver, Canada region in July 2005, with filming largely taking place on Bowen Island. Additional photography took place on the mainland in Merritt. The production budget was $40 million.

== Release ==
Millennium Films sold distribution rights to Alcon Entertainment for distribution through their output deal with Warner Bros. Pictures. The Wicker Man was theatrically released in the United States and Canada on September 1, 2006, screening in 2,784 venues. The film opened in Germany that fall, on November 2, 2006.

=== Home media ===
Warner Bros. Home Entertainment released The Wicker Man on DVD on December 19, 2006, with an unrated alternate ending included. The film continues in the same way as the theatrical version until the ending. Before Malus is taken to the wicker man to be burned alive, he is overpowered and tackled by villagers and sedated with a hive of bees, whose venom he is allergic to. The credits then begin after the wicker man's burning head falls off, omitting the "6 months later" scene. A Blu-ray of the film was released on January 30, 2007.

== Reception ==
=== Box office ===
The Wicker Man earned $9.6 million in its opening weekend, ranking third in the U.S. box office. The film closed on November 16, 2006, after eleven weeks of release, grossing $23.6 million in the US and $15.1 million overseas. The film was a box-office bomb, grossing $38.8 million against a $40 million budget.

=== Critical response ===
On the review aggregator website Rotten Tomatoes, 15% of 107 critics' reviews are positive, with an average rating of 3.7/10. The website's consensus reads: "Puzzlingly misguided, Neil LaBute's update The Wicker Man struggles against unintentional comedy and fails." Metacritic, which uses a weighted average, assigned the film a score of 36 out of 100, based on 19 critics, indicating "generally unfavorable" reviews. Audiences polled by CinemaScore gave the film a rare average grade of "F" on an A+ to F scale.

Mark Olsen of the Los Angeles Times was underwhelmed by the film, writing that the audience is "asked to wait patiently for terrors that never come and a creepiness that doesn’t quite settle in. In the end, LaBute’s remake is an interesting idea that never transforms into a particularly satisfying movie." A. O. Scott of The New York Times panned the film, writing: "Buzzing bees and echoey children's voices compete for soundtrack space with Angelo Badalamenti's pedestrian score, and Mr. Cage trudges through the woods, badgering women dressed in 19th-century homespun and expressing frustration, disbelief and bewilderment. Indeed, there is reason to wonder just what he is doing in this movie... The deeper question is just what Mr. LaBute, with his reputation as an intellectual provocateur, was doing when he set out to update one of the most enduringly creepy horror films ever made."

On At the Movies, the film got two thumbs down from Richard Roeper and Aisha Tyler, although they both said the film was "entertainingly bad". Owen Gleiberman of Entertainment Weekly wrote that the original film is overrated, but the remake's climax lacks its "tingle of madness".

=== Accolades ===
| Award / association | Year | Category | Recipient(s) | Result | Ref. |
|---|---|---|---|---|---|
| Canadian Society of Cinematographers | 2007 | Best Cinematography | Paul Sarossy | Won | |
| Golden Raspberry Awards | 2007 | Worst Picture | The Wicker Man | Nominated | |
| Golden Raspberry Awards | 2007 | Worst Remake or Rip-off | The Wicker Man | Nominated | |
| Golden Raspberry Awards | 2007 | Worst Actor | Nicolas Cage | Nominated | |
| Golden Raspberry Awards | 2007 | Worst Screenplay | Neil LaBute | Nominated | |
| Golden Raspberry Awards | 2007 | Worst On-Screen Couple | Nicolas Cage (Note: Award for Cage paired with his on-screen bear suit.) | Nominated | |
| Golden Schmoes Awards | 2006 | Worst Movie of the Year | The Wicker Man | Nominated | |
| Stinkers Bad Movie Awards | 2007 | Worst Actor | Nicolas Cage | Nominated | |
| Stinkers Bad Movie Awards | 2007 | Worst Remake | The Wicker Man | Won | |

== Legacy ==
The original film's director, Robin Hardy, had expressed skepticism over the Hollywood remake and had his lawyers make Warner Bros. Pictures remove his name from the remake's promotional material. According to Hardy, he was given writing credit for the screenplay when he had not received any for the original. Christopher Lee, who played Lord Summerisle in the original film, commented: "I don't believe in remakes. You can make a follow-up to a film, but to remake a movie with such history and success just doesn't make sense to me."

Cage himself acknowledged that the film was "absurd". He remarked in 2010, "There is a mischievous mind at work on The Wicker Man, you know? You know what I mean? And I finally kind of said, 'I might have known that the movie was meant to be absurd.' But saying that now after the fact is OK, but to say it before the fact is not, because you have to let the movie have its own life." In February 2012, Cage gave a live webchat with fans to promote Ghost Rider: Spirit of Vengeance. When asked what roles from his career he would most like to revisit, Cage responded, "I would like to hook up with one of the great Japanese filmmakers, like the master that made Ringu, and I would like to take The Wicker Man to Japan, except this time he's a ghost."

A scene exclusive to the unrated version of the film, where Nicolas Cage's character gets tortured by bees, as well a separate scene where he discovers the burned doll have become internet memes.

== Sources ==
- Muir, John Kenneth (2023). Horror Films of 2000–2009. Jefferson, North Carolina: McFarland & Company. ISBN 978-1-476-64450-9.
