= How Doth the Little Crocodile? =

Mystery novel by Anthony and Peter Shaffer

First edition (UK)

How Doth The Little Crocodile? was the first of three murder mystery novels written by twin authors Anthony and Peter Shaffer. It featured their eccentric detective Mr Verity who also appeared in their other novel Withered Murder.

== History ==
How Doth The Little Crocodile? was first published in London by Evans in 1952 in the US by MacMillan in 1957 as part of their "Cock Robin Mystery" books.

The first edition by Evans was published under the pseudonym Peter Antony but this was changed to Anthony & Peter Shaffer by Macmillan. Another change to note is the detective's name goes from Mr Verity in the original to Mr Fathom in the US edition.

== Plot summary ==
NOTE: Mr Verity is known as Mr Fathom in the US edition.

Mr. Verity takes on the case of Roger Hope, a man who had stood trial for the murder of retired judge Sir Derek Livingstone. He was later acquitted due to late evidence that proved his innocence.

Roger Hope, a member of the De Quincey's Society of Connoisseurs in Murder club, wrote to the other members, informing them he knew the identity of the real murderer, which he would reveal at their next meeting. However, before this meeting took place, Roger Hope was struck by a car and killed.

Mr. Verity, himself a member of the connoisseurs' club, had also received the same letter sent to his fellow club members. He finds himself in Allsop, Sussex, investigating Roger Hope's suspicious death and his claims about the identity of Sir Derek Livingstone's real murderer.

Working his way through a variety list of suspects, Mr. Verity finds they all had motives for killing Derek Livingstone, and all had left clues in doing so. However, the truth concerning Roger Hope and his untimely death is even more puzzling, and Mr. Verity's revelations at the conclusion leave the guests of the murder club shocked and amazed.

== Value ==
Despite several attempts by publishers to have them reprinted, these books are now long out of print and copies in excellent condition can sell for high prices.
