= Gary Carpenter (composer) =

British composer

- Born: Hackney, London
- Occupation: Composer

Gary Carpenter (born 1951) is a British composer, of concert music and film scores, and also operas and musicals. He is a visiting professor at the Royal Academy of Music and the Royal Northern College of Music. He was Associate Music Director for the film The Wicker Man, putting together the ensemble Magnet for the occasion. Until 2021, he was a Director of the Ivors Academy. During the 2018-19 season, he was Composer in Association with Royal Liverpool Philharmonic Orchestra.

Carpenter's piece Dadaville premiered at the First Night of the Proms, on 17 July 2015.

== Works ==
=== Orchestra ===
- Satie Variations (1993)
- Dadaville (2015)

=== Ensemble ===
- Da Capo (1981)
- Die Flimmerkiste (1983)
- Ein Musikalisches Snookerspiel (1991) for wind octet
- Pantomime (1995) for woodwind orchestra
- Distanza (2004)
- After Braque (2006)

=== Instrumental ===
- Clarinet Sonata (1991)
- Van Assendelft's Vermeer (2004) for clavichord

=== Dance ===
- Children's Games (1978) for Jiří Kylián, electronic score, work includes also music from the Kindertotenlieder by Mahler
- Interactions (1980) for Christopher Bruce

=== Musical ===
- The Streets of London (1980), libretto by Ian Barnett

=== Opera ===
- The Lost Domain (1984), three acts, libretto by Ian Barnett based on Le Grand Meaulnes
- Doggone (1990), one act, libretto by Simon Nicholson
- Nyanyushka (2007), one of six pieces making up Blind Date, libretto by Simon Nicholson

=== Radio drama ===
- The One Alone (1987), verse drama by Iris Murdoch

=== Soundtracks ===
- The Wicker Man (1973), continuous soundtrack by Paul Giovanni and Carpenter including folk song material
- The Hitchhiker's Guide to the Galaxy (2005)
- Ravenous, Damon Albarn, orchestration with Michael Nyman
