= Paul Giovanni =

American dramatist (1933–1990)

Paul Giovanni (June 2, 1933 – June 17, 1990) was an American playwright, actor, director, singer and musician. Giovanni wrote the music for the 1973 British horror film The Wicker Man.

== Early life ==
Giovanni was born in Atlantic City, New Jersey, and grew up there. He attended St. Joseph's College in Philadelphia before earning a master's degree in drama at The Catholic University of America. His graduate studies were under Rev. Gilbert V. Hartke, OP.

== Career ==
Before Giovanni became an actor, he wrote songs for, and performed with, the Side Show rock group.

Giovanni wrote the music for The Wicker Man soundtrack, also writing the lyrics and singing "Landlord's Daughter" and "Gently Johnny", where he appears in later cuts of the film. He also sang "Corn Riggs", adapting the lyrics from a Robert Burns song. The music was played by a group of six musicians, Gary Carpenter, Peter Brewis, Andrew Tompkins, Ian Cutler, Michael Cole, and Bernard Murray, who used the name Magnet for their collaboration. The group used a combination of traditional and modern (electric) instrumentation; some parts of the soundtrack were augmented by brass instruments.

On Broadway, Giovanni directed Kingdoms (1981). He also wrote and directed The Crucifer of Blood (1978), which was later filmed for TV. Giovanni also composed a musical entitled Shot Thru The Heart, which has only performed at Detroit's Birmingham Theatre before closing.

== Personal life ==
In the early 1970s, Giovanni was in a relationship with Peter Shaffer, playwright and brother of Anthony Shaffer, whom Giovanni later collaborated with on The Wicker Man.

== Death ==
Giovanni died of pneumonia from HIV/AIDS related complications on June 17, 1990.

== Discography ==
- 1970: Side Show - SD-8261 - LP with Greg Kreutz.
- 1973: The Wicker Man soundtrack with Magnet.

== Plays ==
- 1978: The Crucifer of Blood
- 1981: Kingdoms
