= Wrath of the Gods (2026 film) =

2026 British horror film

- Opening titles
- Directed by: Justin Hardy
- Written by: Justin Hardy; Dominic Hardy
- Produced by: Chris Nunn; Alison Palmer
- Cinematography: Robin Keane
- Edited by: Andrew Loveridge
- Music by: Guy Dagul
- Production company: Hardy Pictures Ltd
- Release date: 28 August 2026
- Running time: 94 minutes
- Country: United Kingdom
- Language: English

Wrath of the Gods is a 2026 British horror film directed by Justin Hardy and starring Francis Magee and Christiane Schaldemose. It was written by Justin and Dominic Hardy, and is a sequel to Robin Hardy's films The Wicker Man (1973) and The Wicker Tree (2011), based on his 2015 cancelled project of the same title, the script of which was recovered from his attic.

Justin Hardy died in early August 2026, aged 61, 3 weeks before the film's premiere.

== Synopsis ==
When Anna returns to the North Sea island of Hel for the burial of her husband she is ostracised by the locals who view her as a symbol of evil. When local children begin to disappear, the island must confront its dark history.

== Cast ==
- Francis Magee as Tulloch
- Christiane Schaldemose as Anna
- Lynsey Rendall as Maeve
- Jamie Rhodes as Ingram
- Richard Hughson as Ratter
- Dawn Douglas as Joy
- Martha Robertson as Gudrun
- John Haswell as Knox
- Juliet Mullay as Marnie

== Production ==
The film was shot entirely on location in Shetland.

== Release ==
Wrath of the Gods premiered at the London FrightFest film festival on 28 August 2026.

It is distributed by Unannounced Film Company.

== Reception ==
In FilmHounds magazine Matt Goddard wrote: "Consistently downbeat, often gloomily capturing the landscape and seascape of the Shetlands that fills in for the North Sea island, it's surprising how many beats in Wrath of the Gods meet or subvert The Wicker Man. ...But what it lacks, or deliberately rejects in a conclusion that sees the island's justice come to bear, is the extraordinary liminal space that has kept The Wicker Man in our consciousness since the early 1970s. ... But as a conclusion to a series equally marked by impressive highs as tragic events, this downbeat ending might well be the most fitting finale."
