= Magnet (band) =

British musical group

Magnet was a band formed for the purpose of recording the soundtrack to the 1973 film The Wicker Man. The band was assembled by musician Gary Carpenter (the film's associate musical director) to perform songs composed by New York songwriter Paul Giovanni. Originally under the moniker Lodestone, later changed to "Magnet" because of a conflict with another band, the group included Peter Brewis (recorders, jaw harp, harmonica, bass guitar, etc.), Michael Cole (concertina, harmonica, bassoon), Andrew Tompkins (guitars), Ian Cutler (violin), Bernard Murray (percussion) and finally Carpenter himself (piano, recorders, fife, ocarina, Nordic lyre, etc.). Carpenter, Brewis and Cole had recently graduated from The Royal College of Music in London, and Tompkins, Cutler and Murray were all members of Carpenter's band Hocket. The band featured Giovanni on guitar and vocals for many tracks; he also appeared in the film in various scenes.

In 2004 the Castle label edited the anthology Gather in the Mushrooms: The British Acid Folk Underground 1968-1974, which includes the song "Corn Rigs" from Magnet.

The Wicker Man soundtrack is considered by many to be a major influence on neofolk and psychedelic folk.
