= Ritual (Pinner novel) =

1967 British horror novel by David Pinner

- First edition
- Author: David Pinner
- Language: English
- Genre: Horror fiction
- Publisher: Hutchinson
- Publication date: 1967
- Publication place: United Kingdom
- Media type: Print (hardback & paperback)

Ritual is a horror novel by British actor and author David Pinner, first published in 1967.

== Plot summary ==
An English police officer named David Hanlin—a puritanical Christian—is asked to investigate what appears to be the ritualistic murder of a local child in an enclosed rural Cornish village. During his short stay, Hanlin deals with psychological trickery, sexual seduction, ancient religious practices and nightmarish sacrificial rituals.

== Writing ==
In 1966, when Pinner was 26, he had just written the vampire comedy Fanghorn, and was playing the lead role of Sergeant Trotter in Agatha Christie's The Mousetrap in the West End of London. He decided to write a film treatment that dealt with the occult (like Fanghorn) but which was also a detective story (like The Mousetrap). Film director Michael Winner liked Pinner's Ritual treatment, and considered making it his next film, with English actor John Hurt in mind for the lead role. However, Winner deemed the treatment to be "too full of imagery", and Pinner's agent, Jonathan Clowes, felt that Winner might sit on the project for a long time. The collaboration came to a halt.

Clowes suggested that Pinner instead expand Ritual into a novel, promising that he would get it published. Pinner wrote it in seven weeks, while he was still acting in The Mousetrap. He would write sections of the novel on the tube train on his way into the West End, and even on his dressing room floor. While driving to his agent's office with the only completed copy of Ritual in existence, Pinner accidentally left the manuscript on the roof of the car; it would most likely have fallen off and been lost forever if another driver had not alerted Pinner to his mistake.

== Reception ==
Bob Stanley of The Guardian wrote that "Ritual's opulent dialogue, with the sickly richness of its countryside, and Pinner's decaying village, can stand alone from the book's illustrious successor. But, be warned, like The Wicker Man, it is quite likely to test your dreams of leaving the city for a shady nook by a babbling brook."

== Adaptations ==
=== Films ===
In 1973, Ritual was used as the basis for The Wicker Man, a British horror film directed by Robin Hardy and written for the screen by Anthony Shaffer. Edward Woodward stars as the policeman, renamed Sergeant Neil Howie. Pinner discussed the book in a 2011 interview. "I then sold the film rights of the book to Christopher Lee in 1971 – the basic idea and the structure of it was used for The Wicker Man." Pinner has said that he likes the film, but feels that it lacks the humour of the novel. As a result of the film's popularity, Ritual became a much sought-after collector's item, and was being sold for £400 to £500 on eBay. It was not until the 2011 reprint that the novel became widely available.

In 2006, an American version of The Wicker Man was released. It was written and directed by Neil LaBute, and stars Nicolas Cage as the policeman, renamed Edward Malus in this version. The remake credits Ritual as the original basis for Shaffer's screenplay on which it was based.

=== Play ===
The metafictional stage production by the National Theatre of Scotland, Appointment with the Wicker Man, incorporates aspects of both Shaffer's screenplay and Pinner's novel, weaving them into a single narrative.

== Sequel ==
Pinner wrote The Wicca Woman as a sequel to Ritual; the book was published by Endeavour Press in 2014.
