= Cowboys for Christ =

2006 novel by Robin Hardy

Cowboys for Christ: On May Day
- The first edition cover that made use of the sun disk that was previously used on a poster for The Wicker Man.
- Author: Robin Hardy
- Language: English
- Genre: Horror fiction
- Publisher: Luath Press
- Publication date: 2006
- Publication place: United Kingdom
- Media type: Print (Hardback)
- Pages: 206

Cowboys for Christ: On May Day is a novel written by Robin Hardy, first published in 2006 by Luath Press. It is a partial sequel of Hardy's previous film The Wicker Man (1973), dealing with many of the same themes and ideas, namely the clash between paganism and Christianity. There are also similarities to the plot of Harvest Home by Thomas Tryon.

The book's plot revolves around two young Americans, Beth and Steve, who are members of a fundamentalist Protestant Christian group in their home of Texas, U.S.A. Travelling to Scotland in order to preach, they arrive at Tressock, where they are welcomed by the local aristocrat, Sir Lachlan Morrison and his wife, Delia Morrison. What they fail to realise is that the Morrisons and many of the locals are members of a contemporary Pagan religion devoted to the worship of the goddess Sulis, and that they plan to sacrifice the Texan couple on May Day.

== Plot ==
Beth is a successful pop music singer and a devout Protestant Christian from Texas, United States. She and her boyfriend Steve both belong to a group known as the "Cowboys for Christ", who travel to "heathen areas" of the world to preach Christianity. They travel to Glasgow, Scotland, hoping to save some souls once there. However, they are shocked when they receive a very negative reception, Beth even being set upon by a large dog.

After performing a concert at a local cathedral, the duo are approached by Lord Lachlan and his wife Delia, aristocrats from the small village of Tressock in the Scottish lowlands. They invite Beth and Steve to come back with them to Tressock in order to preach.

Meanwhile, Detective Orlando is sent to Tressock, posing as the local police officer, in order to secretly investigate reports of a pagan cult.

Beth and Steve decide that they shall begin their preaching at the May Day celebrations in the village. Meanwhile, Orlando discovers that the people of the village worship the ancient Celtic goddess Sulis.

In an attempt to impress the locals, Steve and Beth agree to becoming the local Queen of the May and the Laddie for the festival. In this role, they must split up for the day, and it is during this that the Laddie is devoured by the locals on an island in the middle of the river Sulis. Beth discovers this, and tries to escape, but is captured and embalmed.

== Film adaptation ==
Cowboys for Christ provided the basis for the 2011 film, The Wicker Tree. The Wicker Tree had its premiere at the Fantasia Festival in Montreal in July 2011. Anchor Bay handled U.S. distribution.
