= Lesley Mackie =

British actress (born 1951)

- Born: 10 June 1951 (age 75)
- Occupation: Actress
- Years active: 1971–present

Lesley Mackie (born 10 June 1951) is a British actress, known for her Olivier Award-winning performance as Judy Garland in the original London cast of Judy. She is also known for her role as Daisy in the horror films The Wicker Man and The Wicker Tree.

== Film credits ==
Year	Film/Series	Role
1973	The Wicker Man	Daisy
1981	A Sense of Freedom	Malkie's Wife
2011	The Wicker Tree	Daisy

== Television ==
Year	Title	Role	Notes
1971	Thirty-Minute Theatre	Girl	Episode: "Allotment"
1972	Play for Today	Alison	Episode: "Just Your Luck"
1973	Full House	Actress in "The Man Who Knew About Electricity"	1 episode
1973	Sutherland's Law	Alison Walker	Episode: "A Cry for Help"
1976	Centre Play	Ruth	Episode: "A Wily Couple"
1979	Charles Endell, Esq	Sheonaugh	Episode: "Slaughter on Piano Street"
1980	The Lost Tribe	Bess	Miniseries
1991-1996	Screen Two	Chambermaid/Hotel Supervisor	2 episodes
1994	The All New Alexei Sayle Show	Various	1 episode
1998-2003	High Road	Maureen Gilchrist	12 episodes

== Theatre ==
- Judy
- Brigadoon

== Video Games ==
Year	Title	Role	Notes
2018	The Bard's Tale IV: Barrows Deep	Goodie MacNair	
