= David Pinner =

British actor and novelist (1940–2025)

- Born: 6 October 1940; Peterborough, England
- Died: 22 December 2025 (aged 85)
- Occupations: Actor, novelist

David John Pinner (6 October 1940 – 22 December 2025) was a British actor and novelist. He trained at the Royal Academy of Dramatic Art and has appeared on stage and television in many roles.

As an actor, he was known for Emergency Ward 10 (1962), Z Cars (1967), The Growing Pains of PC Penrose (1975), (1985), Henry V (1979), The Prince Regent (1979) and Agatha Christie's Miss Marple: A Murder Is Announced.

His 1967 novel Ritual was a major inspiration for Anthony Shaffer's film The Wicker Man (1973). In 2014 he published The Wicca Woman, a sequel to Ritual.

Pinner died from pancreatic cancer on 22 December 2025, at the age of 85.

== Novels ==
- Ritual (1967) Hutchinson/Arrow
- With My Body (1969) Weidenfeld & Nicolson/Corgi
- There'll Always Be An England (1985) Anthony Blond
- Ritual (2011) Finderskeepers
- Ritual (2014) ebook Endeavour Press
- The Wicca Woman (2014) ebook Endeavour Press

== Stage plays performed ==
- Dickon (1966) Queens's Theatre, Hornchurch
- Fanghorn (1967) Traverse Theatre, Edinburgh
- Fanghorn (1968) Fortune Theatre, London with Glenda Jackson
- The Drums of Snow (1969) Stanford Repertory Theatre, California
- Lightning at a Funeral (1970) Stanford Repertory Theatre
- Marriages (1972) L.A.M.DA, London
- Cartoon (1973)Soho Poly, London
- Hereward the Wake (1974) Key Theatre, Peterborough
- Richelieu (1976) BBC
- Lucifer's Fair (1976) Arts Theatre, London
- Shakebag (1976) Soho Poly, London
- Talleyrand, Prince of Traitors (1978) BBC
- An Evening with the G.L.C (1979) Soho Poly, London
- The Potsdam Quartet (1980) Lyric Theatre, Hammersmith + BBC
- Screwball (1982) Theatre Royal, Plymouth
- The Potsdam Quartet (1982) Lion Theatre, New York
- Revelations (1986) Grinnell, Iowa, USA
- The Teddy Bears' Picnic (1988)Gateway Theatre, Chester
- Skin Deep (1989) Gateway Theatre, Chester
- The Last Englishman (1990) Orange Tree Theatre, Richmond
- The Sins of the Mother (1996) Grace Theatre, London
- Lenin in Love (2000) New End Theatre, Hampstead, London
- All Hallows' Eve (2002) Hong Kong Academy of Performing Arts
- Midsummer (2003) Brehmer Theatre, Hamilton, New York
- Oh, To Be in England (2011) Finborough Theatre, London
- The Potsdam Quartet (2013) Jermyn Street Theatre, London
- Edred, the Vampyre (2019) The Old Red Lion, London

== Stage plays published ==
- Fanghorn (1966) Penguin Modern Playwrights 2
- Dickon (1967) Penguin Plays, New English Dramatists 10
- Drums of Snow (1968) Penguin Plays, New English Dramatists 13
- Drums of Snow (1972) Plays of the Year, Paul Elek Books Ltd
- The Potsdam Quartet (1980) Terra Nova Editions
- The Potsdam Quartet (1982) Samuel French
- Lenin in Love (2000) Oberon Books
- Two Plays; The Teddy Bears' Picnic/The Potsdam Quartet (2002) Oberon Modern Playwrights
- Midsummer/All Hallows' Eve (2002) Oberon Modern Plays
- Newton's Hooke (2003) Imperial College Press
- The Stalin Trilogy; Lenin in Love/The Teddy Bears' Picnic/The Potsdam Quartet (2003) Oberon Modern Playwrights
- Lady Day/Revelations (2003) Oberon Modern Plays
- Three Power Plays; The Drums of Snow/Richelieu/Prince of Traitors (2006) Oberon Modern Playwrights
- Oh, To Be in England (2011) Oberon Modern Playwrights
- The Vampire Trilogy; Fanghorn/Edred, the Vampyre/Lucifer's Fair (2011) Oberon Modern Playwrights
- The Joy of Misery; four one-act plays; Cartoon/An Evening with the G.L.C/Shakebag/Succubus (2012) Oberon Modern Playwrights
