= The Wicker Man =

1973 film by Robin Hardy

- Theatrical release poster
- Directed by: Robin Hardy
- Screenplay by: Anthony Shaffer
- Based on: Ritual by David Pinner
- Produced by: Peter Snell
- Starring: Edward Woodward; Britt Ekland; Diane Cilento; Ingrid Pitt; Christopher Lee
- Cinematography: Harry Waxman
- Edited by: Eric Boyd-Perkins
- Music by: Paul Giovanni
- Production company: British Lion Films
- Distributed by: British Lion Films
- Release date: 6 December 1973
- Running time: 88 minutes
- Country: United Kingdom
- Language: English
- Budget: £471,600–500,000
- Box office: $885,371

The Wicker Man is a 1973 British folk horror film directed by Robin Hardy and starring Edward Woodward, Britt Ekland, Diane Cilento, Ingrid Pitt, and Christopher Lee. The screenplay is by Anthony Shaffer, inspired by David Pinner's 1967 novel Ritual, and Paul Giovanni composed the film score. The plot centres on the visit of a police officer, Sergeant Neil Howie, to the fictional, isolated Scottish island of Summerisle in search of a missing girl. Howie, a devout Christian, is appalled to find that the inhabitants of the island have abandoned Christianity and now practise a form of Celtic paganism.

At the time of its release in 1973, The Wicker Man received mixed reviews, though it earned multiple nominations at the 6th Saturn Awards in the United States, where it won the award for Best Horror Film. The film has garnered critical praise in the years following its release, and was deemed by the film magazine Cinefantastique as "The Citizen Kane of horror movies". In 2004, Total Film magazine named it the sixth-greatest British film of all time. The film also introduced the wicker man, a druid effigy, into modern popular culture.

In 1989, Shaffer wrote a script treatment for The Loathsome Lambton Worm, a direct sequel with fantasy elements. Hardy had no interest in the project, and it went unproduced. In 2006, a poorly received American remake starring Nicolas Cage was released, from which Hardy and others involved with the original dissociated themselves. In 2011, a spiritual sequel was released, written and directed by Hardy, The Wicker Tree, which featured Lee in a cameo appearance. In 2013, the original U.S. theatrical version of The Wicker Man was digitally restored and released. Another sequel, Wrath of the Gods, directed by Robin Hardy's son Justin Hardy, was released in August 2026.

== Plot ==
On 29 April 1973, Sergeant Neil Howie of the West Highlands Constabulary journeys by seaplane to the remote, verdant Hebridean island of Summerisle to investigate the disappearance of a young girl, Rowan Morrison, about whom he has received an anonymous letter. Howie, a devout Christian, is disturbed to find the islanders paying homage to the pagan Celtic gods of their ancestors, with churches having fallen into disuse. They copulate openly in the fields, include children as part of the May Day celebrations, teach children of the phallic association of the maypole, and one places a toad in a child's mouth to cure a sore throat. The islanders appear to be trying to thwart his investigation by claiming that Rowan never existed.

While Howie is staying at the Green Man Inn, the landlord's daughter attempts to seduce him but he resists, explaining that he is engaged and must reserve sex for marriage. He notices a series of photographs celebrating the annual harvest, each featuring a young girl as the May Queen. The photograph of the most recent celebration is missing and the landlord tells him it was broken. At the local school, Howie asks the students about Rowan, but all deny her existence. He checks the school register and finds Rowan's name. He questions the schoolteacher, who directs him to Rowan's grave.

The next day, 30 April, Howie meets the island's leader, Lord Summerisle, grandson of a Victorian agronomist, to get permission to exhume Rowan's body. Summerisle explains that, in 1868, his grandfather developed strains of fruit trees that would prosper in Scotland's climate and encouraged the belief that returning to the old gods would bring prosperity to the island's previously Christian population. Due to the bountiful harvests, the island's other inhabitants gradually embraced paganism, and the Christian ministers fled to the mainland.

Exhuming Rowan's grave, Howie finds that the coffin contains only the body of a hare. He also finds the missing harvest photograph, showing Rowan standing amidst empty boxes; the harvest had failed for the first time since the orchards were established. His research reveals that a human sacrifice is offered to the gods in the event of crop failure. He concludes that Rowan is alive and will soon be sacrificed to ensure a successful harvest in the current season.

The following morning, on May Day, Howie seeks assistance from the mainland and returns to his seaplane, only to discover it no longer functions and its radio is damaged, so he cannot leave or call for help. Later that day, during the May Day celebration, Howie subdues the innkeeper and steals his costume and mask of Punch (the Fool) to infiltrate the parade, involving a long sword dance. Rowan is eventually revealed. Howie sets her free and flees with her into a cave. Exiting it, they are intercepted by the islanders, to whom Rowan happily returns.

Summerisle tells Howie that Rowan was never the intended sacrifice — Howie is. He fits their gods' four requirements: he came of his own free will, he has "the power of a king" by representing the law, he is a virgin, and he is a "fool" for falling for their deception. Howie warns Summerisle and the islanders that the crops are failing due to the unsuitability of the climate, and that the villagers will turn on Summerisle and sacrifice him next summer when the harvest fails again, but his pleas are ignored.

The villagers force Howie inside a giant wicker man statue along with various animals, set it ablaze, and surround it, singing the Middle English folk song "Sumer Is Icumen In". Inside the wicker man, Howie recites Psalm 23 and prays to God. Howie and the animals burn to death as the head of the wicker man collapses in flames, revealing the setting sun.

== Cast ==
- Edward Woodward as Sgt. Neil Howie
- Christopher Lee as Lord Summerisle
- Britt Ekland as Willow MacGregor
  - Annie Ross as Willow MacGregor (voice)
  - Rachel Verney as Willow MacGregor (singing voice)
- Lesley Mackie as Daisy
- Diane Cilento as Miss Rose
- Ingrid Pitt as Librarian
- Lindsay Kemp as Alder MacGregor (the landlord)
- Ian Campbell as Oak
- Russell Waters as Harbour Master
- Aubrey Morris as Old Gardener/Gravedigger
- Irene Sunter as May Morrison
- Jennifer Martin as Myrtle Morrison
- Donald Eccles as T.H. Lennox
- Walter Carr as Schoolmaster
- Roy Boyd as Broome
- Peter Brewis as Musician
- Geraldine Cowper as Rowan Morrison
- John Young as Fishmonger
- Myra Forsyth as Mrs Grimmond
- Fiona Kennedy as Holly Grimmond
- Alison Hughes as Sgt Howie's fiancée
- Barbara Rafferty as woman with baby
- John Sharp as Doctor Ewan (longer version)
- John Hallam as Police Constable Hugh McTaggart (longer version)
- Tony Roper as Postman (longer version)

== Themes ==
Religious extremism has been cited by numerous scholars as a prominent theme in the film, which unfolds in two opposing theologies: Christianity and Celtic neo-paganism.

Journalist Heather Greene, writing in a 2023 retrospective for Religion News Service, observes that "the movie's religious themes and representations are not easy to negotiate for pagans—or any viewer, for that matter. While the nature-loving pagans may not be evil satanists, they are not the heroes either. Nor, on the other hand, is the Christian officer, whose fundamentalism leads him into the breast, quite literally, of the Wicker Man." The filmmaker Eli Roth similarly commented: "I think what makes [the film] so incredibly relevant is the theme of devout, religious belief. That any kind of religious zealot that would kill in the name of their own religion."

== Production ==
=== Background ===
In the early 1970s, Christopher Lee was a Hammer Horror regular, best known for his roles in a series of successful films, beginning with The Curse of Frankenstein (as the monster, 1957). Lee wanted to break free of this image and take on more interesting acting roles. The idea for The Wicker Man film began in 1971 when Lee met with screenwriter Anthony Shaffer, and they agreed to work together. Film director Robin Hardy and British Lion head Peter Snell became involved in the project. Shaffer had a series of conversations with Hardy, and the two decided that making a horror film centring on "old religion" would be fun, in sharp contrast to the Hammer films they had both seen as horror film fans.

Shaffer read the David Pinner novel Ritual, in which a devout Christian policeman is called to investigate what appears to be the ritual murder of a young girl in a rural village, and decided that it would serve well as the source material for the project. Pinner had originally written Ritual as a film treatment for director Michael Winner, who had John Hurt in mind as a possible star. Winner eventually declined the project, so Pinner's agent persuaded him to write Ritual as a novel instead. Shaffer and Lee paid Pinner £15,000 (equivalent to £190,000 in 2025) for the rights to the novel, and Shaffer set to work on the screenplay. He soon decided that a direct adaptation would not work well, so drafted a new story based only loosely on the story of the novel.

Shaffer wanted the film to be "a little more literate" than the average horror picture. He specifically wanted a film with a minimum of violence and gore. He was tired of seeing horror films that relied almost entirely on viscera to be scary. The focus of the film was crystallised when he "finally hit upon the abstract concept of sacrifice." The image of the wicker man, which gave the filmmakers their title, was taken from the description of the practice of human sacrifice by the Gauls in Julius Caesar's Commentaries on the Gallic War: "Others have figures of vast size, the limbs of which formed of osiers they fill with living men, which being set on fire, the men perish enveloped in the flames." For Shaffer, this was "the most alarming and imposing image that I had ever seen." The idea of a confrontation between a modern Christian and a remote, pagan community continued to intrigue Shaffer, who performed painstaking research on paganism. Brainstorming with Hardy, they conceived the film as presenting the pagan elements objectively and accurately, accompanied by authentic music and a believable, contemporary setting. One of their main resources was The Golden Bough, a study of mythology and religion written by Scottish anthropologist James Frazer.

=== Casting ===
Edward Woodward was cast in the role of Sergeant Neil Howie after the part was declined by both Michael York and David Hemmings. In Britain, Woodward was best known for playing the title role in the television series Callan (1967–1972). After The Wicker Man, Woodward went on to receive international attention for his roles in the film Breaker Morant (1980) and the TV series The Equalizer (1985–89).

After Shaffer saw her on the stage, he lured Diane Cilento out of semi-retirement to play the town's schoolmistress. (They lived together in Queensland from 1975, and married in 1985). Ingrid Pitt, another British horror film veteran, was cast as the town librarian and registrar; she had an affair with Peter Snell during filming which reportedly upset her husband George Pinches (head of cinema bookings for the Rank Organisation) and led to the film struggling to find distribution. Swedish actress Britt Ekland was cast as the innkeeper's lascivious daughter, although two body doubles were used for her naked scenes below the waist. Ekland found out that she was three months pregnant with her son Nic, to Lou Adler, two weeks into filming. Stuart Hopps (the film's choreographer) called upon Lorraine Peters, a nightclub dancer from Glasgow, who gyrated at the doorway and against the wall of a bedroom in the fully nude "wall" scenes. Ekland's speaking and singing voices were dubbed by Annie Ross and Rachel Verney respectively.

Local girl Jane Jackson was employed as Ekland's stand-in for camera setups. Jackson was blonde-haired and bore a resemblance to Ekland but was otherwise not involved in any filming.

=== Filming ===
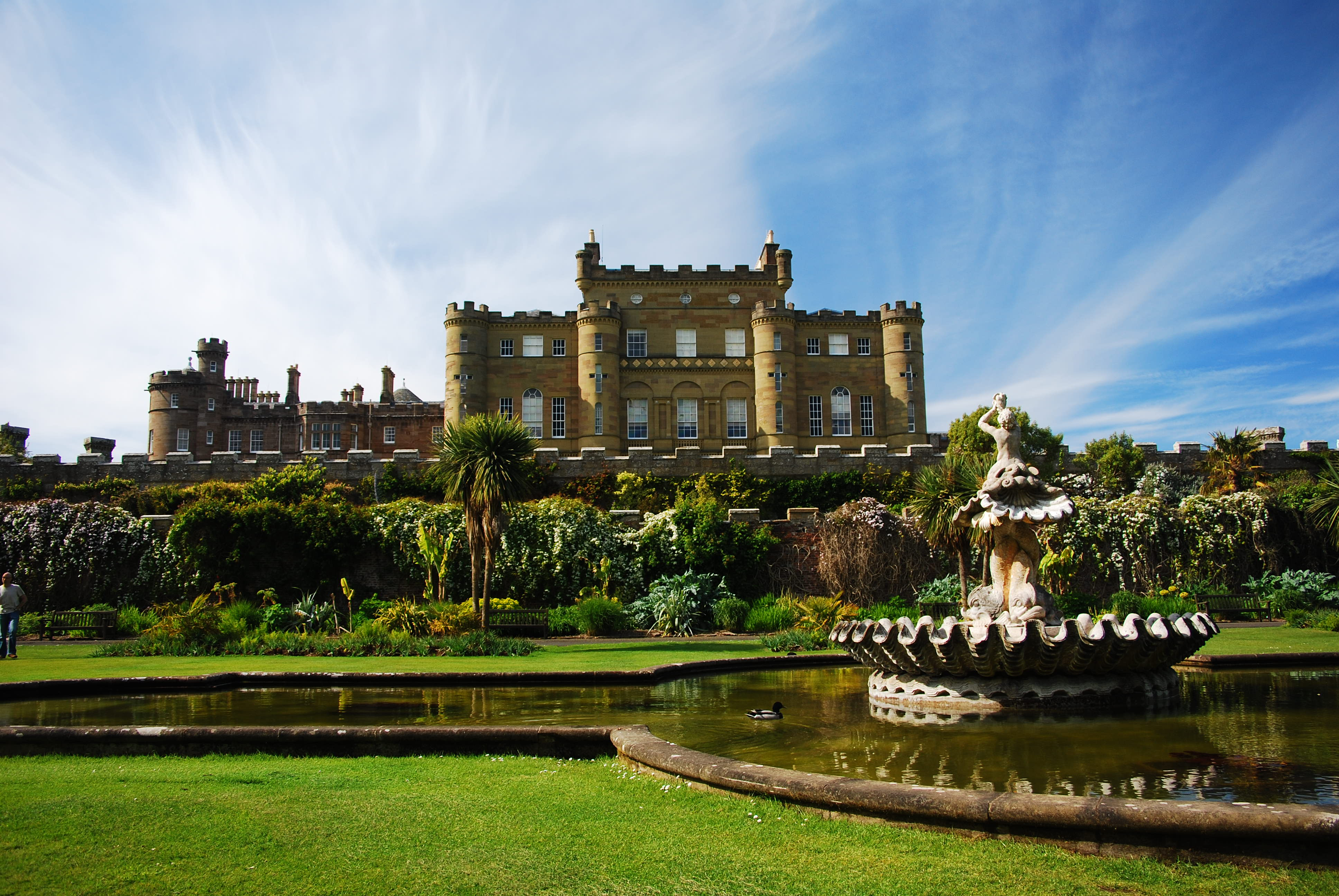
Culzean Castle on the Ayrshire coast

The film was produced at a time of crisis for the British film industry. The studio in charge of production, British Lion Films, was in financial trouble and was bought by wealthy businessman John Bentley. To convince the unions that he was not about to asset strip the company, Bentley needed to get a film into production quickly. This meant that although The Wicker Man was set in spring, filming actually began in October 1972; artificial leaves and blossoms had to be glued to trees in many scenes. The production was kept on a small budget. Christopher Lee was extremely keen to get the film made; he and others worked on the production without pay. While filming took place, British Lion was bought by EMI Films.

The film was shot almost entirely in the small Scottish towns of Stranraer, Gatehouse of Fleet, Newton Stewart, Kirkcudbright, Anwoth and Creetown in Galloway, as well as Plockton in Ross-shire. Some scenes were filmed in and around the Isle of Whithorn, where the owners of the castle, Elizabeth McAdam McLaughland and David Wheatley, plus several other local people, featured in various scenes. Culzean Castle in Ayrshire and its grounds and Floors Castle in Roxburghshire were also used for the shooting. Some of the opening flying shots feature the Isle of Skye, including the pinnacles of The Storr and the Quiraing. The interior cave scenes were filmed inside Wookey Hole in Somerset. Hush Heath Estate in Staplehurst, Kent, makes a brief appearance in the film, doubling as Lord Summerisle's orchard and gardens. The climax of the film was shot at St Ninian's Cave and on the clifftops at Burrow Head in Wigtownshire.

The amphibious aircraft that carries Sergeant Howie was a Thurston Teal, owned and flown in the aerial sequences by Christopher Murphy.

According to Britt Ekland, some animals perished in The Wicker Man, whereas Robin Hardy said in an interview that great care was taken to ensure that the animals were in no danger of being hurt during this scene, and that they were not inside the wicker man when it was set on fire.

=== Music ===
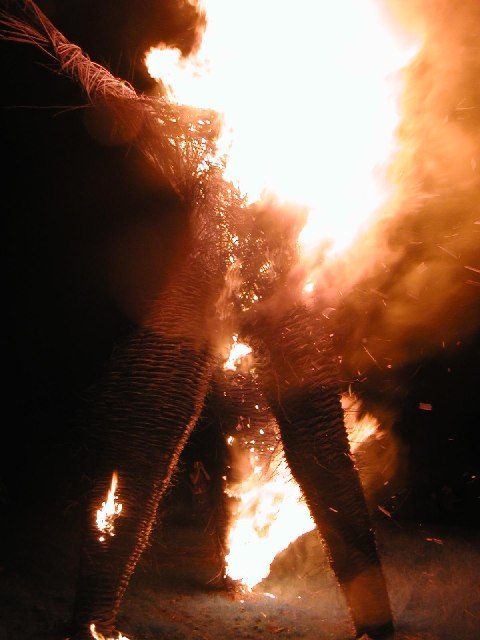
Wickerman Festival, Dundrennan, Scotland, burning of the effigy

The score was arranged, recorded and part composed by Paul Giovanni. According to Seamus Flannery in a subsequent documentary, director Robin Hardy surprised the cast by suddenly announcing midway through filming that they were making a "musical"; performed by Magnet (in some versions of the film credited as "Lodestone"), the soundtrack contains 13 folk songs performed by characters in the film. Included are traditional songs, original compositions by Giovanni, and even a nursery rhyme, "Baa, Baa, Black Sheep".

"Willow's Song" has been covered or sampled by various rock music bands. It was first covered by an English musical project known as Nature and Organisation on their 1994 release Beauty Reaps the Blood of Solitude with singer Rose McDowall (of the Scottish duo Strawberry Switchblade) providing vocals. It was covered by Sneaker Pimps as "How Do", and is included on their 1996 release Becoming X. "How Do" can be heard in the movie Hostel (2005); credited in the end titles as being composed by Sneaker Pimps. Additionally, the band has covered "Gently Johnny" as "Johnny"; it is featured as a B-side on their single "Roll On" (1996). It also was covered by Faith and the Muse on their 2003 album The Burning Season, and The Mock Turtles on their album Turtle Soup.

The songs on the soundtrack were composed or arranged by Giovanni under the direction of Hardy and Shaffer, whose research into the oral folk tradition in England and Scotland was based largely on the work of Cecil Sharp, a "founding father" of the folk-revival movement of the early 20th century. Using Sharp's collections as a template, Shaffer noted to Giovanni which scenes were to have music, and in some cases provided lyrics, which would be appropriate to spring pagan festivals. Other songs on the soundtrack come from a later folk tradition; for example, "Corn Riggs", by Scotland's national bard, Robert Burns, accompanies Howie's arrival on Summerisle. The lyrics of this song were taken directly from the Burns song "The Rigs of Barley", but Giovanni used a very different tune. Burns' tune was based on "Corn Riggs", and altered to match his lyrics. The song sung by the cultists of Summerisle at the end of the film, "Sumer Is Icumen In", is a mid-13th-century song about nature in spring.

The film also gave its name to the Wickerman Festival, an annual music festival held near Auchencairn in Galloway. Dubbed "Scotland's Alternative Music festival", it began in 2001 when the festival's artistic director Sid Ambrose hit upon the idea of a local counterculture-based family-friendly festival, due to the surrounding area being inextricably linked with various locations used within The Wicker Man. It was held annually until 2015 at East Kirkcarswell Farm, Dundrennan.

== Release ==
The Wicker Man has had a complicated distribution history, "so complex that there are book-length studies devoted to it." By the time of the film's completion, British Lion was managed by Michael Deeley. The DVD commentary track states that studio executives suggested a more "upbeat" ending to the film, in which a sudden rain puts the flames of the wicker man out and spares Howie's life, but this suggestion was refused. Hardy subsequently removed about 20 minutes of scenes on the mainland, early investigations, and (to Lee's disappointment) some of Lord Summerisle's initial meeting with Howie.

=== Original theatrical run ===
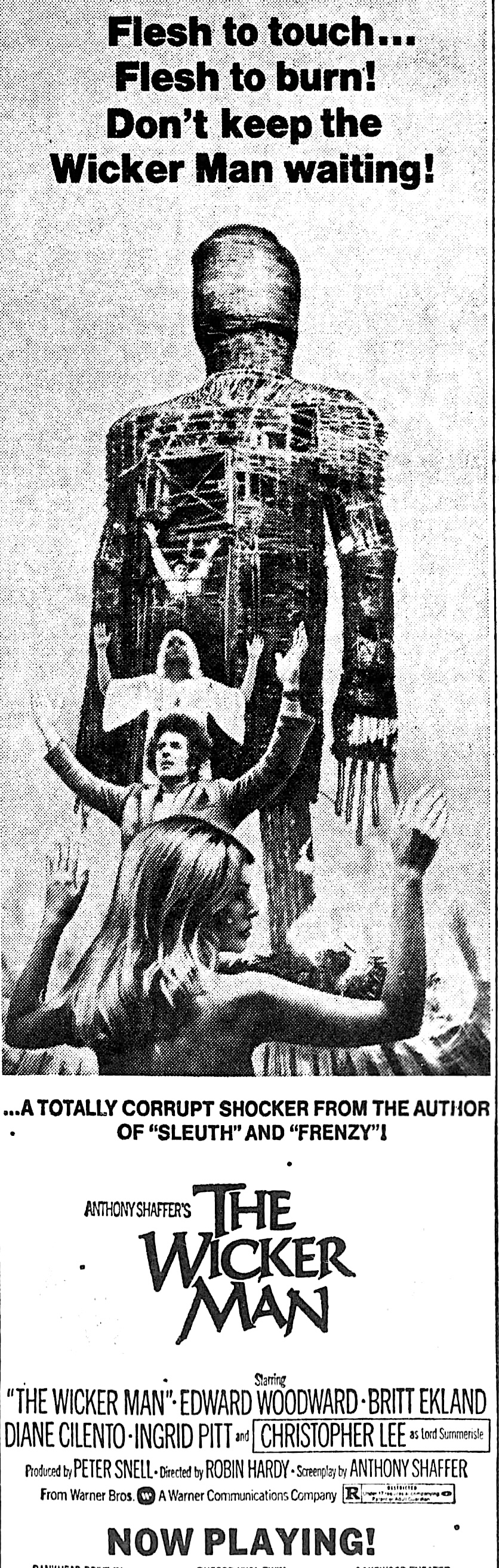
1974 American newspaper advertisement in The Atlanta Journal

The first screening of the film was to trade and cinema distributors on 3 December 1973. The first public theatrical release was a week of test screenings at the Metropole Cinema London on 6 December 1973, ahead of the official public release in January 1974. This cut, which runs 87 minutes, was shown as the "B" picture on a double bill with Don't Look Now (1973). According to Lee, the cuts adversely affected the film's continuity.

A copy of a finished, 99-minute version was sent to American film producer Roger Corman in Hollywood to make a judgment of how to market the film in the U.S. Corman recommended an additional 13 minutes be cut from the film. Corman offered $50,000 for U.S. distribution rights, though his offer was ultimately declined. Distribution rights in the United States ultimately went to Warner Bros. Pictures, who test-marketed the film at American drive-ins, screening it in the greater Atlanta area in May 1974.

=== Restorations and home media ===
==== First restoration ====
During the mid-1970s, Hardy made inquiries about the film, hoping to restore it to his original vision. Along with Lee and Shaffer, Hardy searched for his original cut, or raw footage. Both of these appeared to have been lost. Director Alex Cox said in his Moviedrome introduction in 1988 that the negative had "ended up in the pylons that support the M4 motorway." Hardy recalled that a copy of the film made prior to Deeley's cuts was sent to Roger Corman, who, it turned out, still had it, possibly the only existing print of Hardy's original cut.

The U.S. rights had been sold by Warner Bros. to a small firm called Abraxas, managed by film buff Stirling Smith and critic John Alan Simon. Stirling agreed to an American release of a reconstruction by Hardy based on the print kept by Roger Corman. Hardy restored the narrative structure, some of the erotic elements which had been excised, and a very brief pretitle segment of Howie on the mainland (appearing at a church with his fiancée).

Ron Weinberg, a once co-partner of Abraxas, sub-licensed the film from the firm along with Micheline Charest, and began screening Hardy's reconstructed cut in Jackson, Missouri and Baton Rouge, Louisiana, via the newly-formed Hemisphere Pictures in November 1977. Despite the filmmakers' concern that Southern audiences may be offended by the film, it was well-received, particularly by local religious leaders. In December 1977, Weinberg and Charest screened the film under their new enterprise, Summerisle Films, in New Orleans, where it was also well-received. In January 1979, the film began showing at San Francisco's Castro Theatre, followed by a four month-long run at the city's Lumiere Theatre.

==== US VHS versions ====
The original 99-minute version was available in the United States on VHS home video from Media Home Entertainment (and later Magnum) during the 1980s and 1990s. This video includes additional early scenes set inside Howie's police station, which Hardy had left out of the 1979 restoration. In 2001, a remaster of the 88-minute cut was released on VHS, labelled as the "Theatrical Version".

==== Director's cut ====
In 2001, the film's new world rights owners, Canal+, tried to release the full-length film. Corman's copy had been lost, but a telecine transfer to 1-inch videotape existed. Missing elements were combined with film elements from the previous versions (in particular, additional scenes of Howie on the mainland were restored, showing him to be the object of gossip at his police station, establishing his devout religiosity). The extended DVD cut was released by Canal+ (Anchor Bay Entertainment handling US DVD distribution) in this 99-minute hybrid, considered the longest and closest version to Hardy's original 100-odd minute version. A two-disc limited edition set was sold with the shortened theatrical release, the new extended version and a documentary, The Wicker Man Enigma.

In 2005, Inside the Wicker Man author Allan Brown revealed he had discovered stills taken on the set showing sequences from the script that had never been seen; it had never been certain that the scenes had been filmed. They include scenes where Howie closes a mainland pub open after hours, encounters a prostitute, has a massage from Willow McGregor, and sees a brutal confrontation between Oak and a villager in The Green Man, which were featured in a revised edition of Inside the Wicker Man. Anchor Bay released a limited-edition wooden box of The Wicker Man. About 50,000 two-disc sets were made, of which 20 were signed by Lee and Woodward, Shaffer, Snell, and Hardy. In March 2002, Lee discussed the lost original cut, "I still believe it exists somewhere, in cans with no name. I still believe that. But nobody's ever seen it since, so we couldn't re-cut it, re-edit it, which was what I wanted to do. It would have been ten times as good".

==== The Final Cut ====
StudioCanal, the European distributors of the film, began a Facebook campaign in 2013 to find missing material, which culminated in the discovery of a 92-minute 35 mm print at the Harvard Film Archive. This print had previously been known as the "Middle Version" and was itself assembled from a 35 mm print of the original edit Robin Hardy. Hardy now believed that his original edit will probably never be found, saying, "Sadly, it seems as though this has been lost forever. However, I am delighted that a 1979 Abraxas print has been found as I also put together this cut myself, and it crucially restores the story order to that which I had originally intended."

Hardy reported in July 2013 that Studiocanal intended to restore and release the most complete version possible of the film. Rialto Pictures announced that it was to release the new digital restoration in North American cinemas on 27 September 2013. This new version was also released on DVD on 13 October 2013. It is 91 minutes long, shorter than the director's cut but longer than the theatrical cut, and is known as The Wicker Man: The Final Cut.

The Final Cut (UK) Blu-ray (2013) features short documentaries "Burnt Offering: The Cult of the Wicker Man", "Worshipping the Wicker Man", "The Music of the Wicker Man", interviews with director Robin Hardy and actor Christopher Lee, a restoration comparison, and the theatrical trailer. The second disc features both the UK 87-minute theatrical cut and the 95-minute 2013 director's cut, along with an audio commentary on the director's cut and a making-of for the commentary. The third disc is the soundtrack of the film.

==== 50th anniversary restoration ====
In 2023, for the 50th anniversary of the film's release, StudioCanal announced 4K resolution restoration of existing footage, and remastering of the existing three cuts. On 21 June, the 4K restoration of The Final Cut was screened in cinemas across the UK along with a Q&A filmed in London, hosted by Edith Bowman with guests including Britt Ekland, and Robin Hardy's sons Justin and Dominic promoting their Wickermania! documentary. On 24 June, the Barbican Centre held "Musics from Summerisle", a live performance celebration of the anniversary.

On 25 September 2023, StudioCanal released a 4K UHD Blu-ray in the United Kingdom, available in limited edition digipak and steelbook editions, as well as a standard packaging edition. In the United States, a 4K UHD Blu-ray was released the following month via Lionsgate in steelbook packaging, sold exclusively at Best Buy.

== Reception ==
=== Critical reaction ===
David McGillivray of The Monthly Film Bulletin praised the film as "an immensely enjoyable piece of hokum, thoroughly well researched, performed and directed." Variety wrote that Anthony Shaffer's screenplay "for sheer imagination and near-terror, has seldom been equalled." Kevin Thomas of the Los Angeles Times called it "a witty work of the macabre" with "the splendid performances typical of British films." Janet Maslin of The New York Times was more negative, calling it "handsomely photographed" with "good performances," but "something of a howl" even though "it seems to have been made in all seriousness."

The Wicker Man initially had moderate success and won the Golden Licorn for Best Film at the 1974 Paris International Festival of Fantastic and Science-Fiction Film, but largely slipped into obscurity. In 1977, the American film magazine Cinefantastique devoted a commemorative issue to the film, asserting that it is "the Citizen Kane of horror movies" — an oft-quoted phrase attributed to that issue.

Decades after its release, the film still receives positive reviews from critics and is considered one of the best films of 1973. On the review aggregator website Rotten Tomatoes, 92% of 71 critics' reviews are positive. The website's consensus reads: "This intelligent horror film is subtle in its thrills and chills, with an ending that is both shocking and truly memorable." Metacritic, which uses a weighted average, assigned the film a score of 87 out of 100, based on 16 critics, indicating "universal acclaim".

In 2008, The Wicker Man was ranked by Empire at No. 485 of The 500 Greatest Movies of All Time. Christopher Lee considered The Wicker Man his best film. Similarly, Edward Woodward said that The Wicker Man was one of his favourite films and that the character of Howie was the best part he ever played. In addition to Lee's admiration of the final shot of the film (of the collapsing wicker man), Woodward said that it is the best final shot of any film ever made. In 2010 The Guardian newspaper ranked it as No 4 in its "25 best horror films of all time" listings.

=== Accolades ===
| Award / association | Year | Category | Recipient(s) | Result | Ref. |
|---|---|---|---|---|---|
| Paris International Festival of Fantastic and Science-Fiction Film | 1974 | Golden Licorn (Best Film) | The Wicker Man | Won | |
| Rondo Hatton Classic Horror Awards | 2006 | Best DVD Commentary | Christopher Lee; Robin Hardy; Edward Woodward; Mark Kermode | Won | |
| Satellite Awards | 2006 | Best Classic DVD Release | The Wicker Man | Nominated | |
| Saturn Awards | 1979 | Best Horror Film | The Wicker Man | Won | |
| Saturn Awards | 1979 | Best Actor | Christopher Lee | Nominated | |
| Saturn Awards | 1979 | Best Director | Robin Hardy | Nominated | |
| Saturn Awards | 1979 | Best Writing | Anthony Shaffer | Nominated | |
| Saturn Awards | 1979 | Best Music | Paul Giovanni | Nominated | |
| Saturn Awards | 2014 | Best Classic Film Release | The Wicker Man | Nominated | |

== Legacy ==
The Wicker Man has come to be regarded as a defining work of British folk horror. The British Film Institute has identified it alongside Witchfinder General (1968) and The Blood on Satan's Claw (1971) as part of the genre's so-called "Unholy Trinity", noting that the imagery and narratives of the three films helped define subsequent conceptions of British folk horror. In 2021, The Guardian described The Wicker Man as a film that popularised the folk-horror genre and had subsequently been reclaimed as a masterpiece of British cinema.

The film has influenced later film and television works. In a 2023 retrospective, the BFI identified its line of influence as including The League of Gentlemen and Ari Aster's Midsommar (2019). Filmmaker William McGregor also cited The Wicker Man and The Blood on Satan's Claw as direct inspirations for his folk-horror film Gwen.

Its influence has also extended beyond cinema. The BFI has noted that modern folk musicians have cited Paul Giovanni's soundtrack as an inspiration, while The Guardian credited the soundtrack's late-1990s reissue with helping to spur a British folk revival that fed into the 2000s freak folk movement.

The film has also attracted substantial academic attention. In 2003, the University of Glasgow's Crichton Campus hosted a three-day conference devoted to The Wicker Man, which subsequently resulted in two collections of scholarly essays examining the film from perspectives including cinema, folklore, religion and paganism.

== Popular culture ==
The film brought the wicker man into modern popular culture.

In 2016, English band Radiohead released the music video for the song "Burn the Witch", made in stop-motion animation and whose storyline greatly resembles that of The Wicker Man.

The White, a 2008 EP by American extreme metal band Agalloch, included three tracks featuring samples of dialogue from the film: "The Isle of Summer", "Summerisle Reprise", and "Sowilo Rune".

== Related works ==
=== Books ===
A novelisation, which expands on the story and bears the same title, was released in 1978. It was written by Hardy and Shaffer.

On 24 October 2023, a new behind-the-scenes book The Wicker Man: The Official Story of the Film was published by Titan Books and written by John Walsh, containing new interviews, photos and others materials from the film. It was licensed by the film's rights holder StudioCanal.

As a former artist, Hardy expressed great interest in the medium of comics, and planned a comic book which would retell the story of The Wicker Man, based on his own storyboards for the film. Hardy was in talks with yet unnamed artists to work on the project, as he found it too difficult to make the characters look consistent from one panel to the next. Hardy was working on his next film, The Wrath of the Gods, at the time of his death on 1 July 2016. He intended the graphic novel and the new film to be released at the same time in autumn 2013; however as of autumn 2014 neither had been released, and the film never started production.

=== Films ===
==== The Loathsome Lambton Worm ====
In 1989, Shaffer wrote a 30-page film script treatment entitled The Loathsome Lambton Worm, a direct sequel to The Wicker Man, for producer Lance Reynolds. It would have been more fantastical in subject matter than the original film, and relied more heavily on special effects. In this continuation of the story, which begins immediately after the ending of the first film, Sergeant Neil Howie is rescued from the burning Wicker Man by a group of police officers from the mainland. Howie sets out to bring Lord Summerisle and his pagan followers to justice, but becomes embroiled in a series of challenges which pit the old gods against his own Christian faith. The script culminates in a climactic battle between Howie and a fire-breathing dragon – the titular Lambton Worm – and ends with a suicidal Howie plunging to his death from a cliff while tied to two large eagles. Shaffer's sequel was never produced, but his treatment, complete with illustrations, was eventually published in the companion book Inside The Wicker Man.

Hardy was not asked to direct the sequel, and never read the script, as he did not like the idea of Howie surviving the sacrifice, or the fact that the actors would have aged by 20 to 30 years between the two films. In May 2010, Hardy discussed The Loathsome Lambton Worm. "I know Tony did write that, but I don't think anyone particularly liked it, or it would have been made." A fan-made full-cast audio drama adaptation of Shaffer's The Loathsome Lambton Worm treatment was eventually released in 2020.

==== The Wicker Man (remake) ====
An American remake of the same name, starring Nicolas Cage and Ellen Burstyn, and directed by Neil LaBute, was released in 2006. The film transposed the story from Scotland to a remote island in the Pacific Northwest of the United States. Hardy expressed concern about the remake.

==== The Wicker Tree ====
In 2011, a spiritual successor film entitled The Wicker Tree was released. It was directed by Hardy and featured an appearance by Lee. Hardy first published the story as a novel, under the name Cowboys for Christ. First announced in April 2000, filming on the project began on 19 July 2009 according to IMDb. It follows two young American Christian evangelists who travel to Scotland; like Woodward's character in The Wicker Man, the two Americans are virgins who encounter a pagan laird and his followers. The film received mixed reviews.

Those involved in the production of the film have given conflicting statements regarding the identity of Christopher Lee's character, referred to only as Old Gentleman in the credits. Writer/director Robin Hardy said that the ambiguity was intentional. Fans would immediately recognise Lee's character as Lord Summerisle. Lee himself has contradicted this, stating that the two are not meant to be the same character, and that The Wicker Tree is not a sequel in any way.

==== Wikermania! / Children of the Wicker Man ====
In 2023, two of Robin Hardy's sons, Justin and Dominic, announced that they had created a documentary about The Wicker Man, called Wickermania!. They had already received permission and a discount from Canal+ to use existing film footage, and had a number of original documents related to the production. They were seeking to fund the release of the documentary, subsequently renamed Children of the Wicker Man, via Kickstarter.

==== Wrath of the Gods ====
Wrath of the Gods, a sequel to the original film, directed by Justin Hardy, premiered at the London FrightFest film festival on 28 August 2026.

=== Stage and live performance ===
A stage adaptation was announced for the 2009 Edinburgh Festival Fringe, and was directed by Andrew Steggall. The production was based jointly upon Anthony Shaffer's original The Wicker Man script and David Pinner's novel Ritual. Robin Hardy gave input on the project, and original songs and music from the film were supervised by Gary Carpenter, the original music director. Workshop rehearsals were held at The Drill Hall in London in March 2008, and a casting call was held in Glasgow in May 2009. After three weeks at the Pleasance in Edinburgh in August 2009, the production was to visit the Perth Rep, Eden Court Theatre in Inverness, and then have a short run at Citizen's Theatre in Glasgow, with hopes for a run in London in 2010. However, in July 2009 it was announced that the production had been cancelled, three weeks before it had been due to preview.

In 2011, the National Theatre of Scotland produced An Appointment with the Wicker Man written by Greg Hemphill and Donald McCleary. The production has an amateur theatre company attempting to stage a Wicker Man musical.

British performers David Bramwell and Eliza Skelton host a travelling show entitled Sing-along-a-Wickerman, which includes many Wicker Man-themed activities culminating in a sing-along screening of the film. The show has been going since at least 2011, and has received positive reviews from news outlets such as The Guardian and Time Out. Director of the film Robin Hardy has attended and has been a part of several shows, calling it "terrific fun."

=== Radio adaptations ===
A radio adaptation by Anthony D. P. Mann was produced by Bleak December Inc. in an arrangement with StudioCanal and broadcast on BBC Radio 4 Extra on 2 December 2023 as part of a "Wicker Man"-themed evening of programmes. The cast included Mann as Sergeant Howie, Brian Blessed as Lord Summerisle, Laurence R. Harvey as MacGregor, Anne-Marie Bergman as Miss Rose, Melissa Radford as Willow and Mei Kiera as Rowan Morrison/Heather.

== See also ==
- Celtic mythology
- Hebridean mythology and folklore
- List of cult films
- List of incomplete or partially lost films
- BFI Top 100 British films

== Sources ==
- Bartholomew, David (1977). "The Wicker Man". Cinefantastique. Vol. 6, no. 3. pp. 4–19.
- Brown, Allan (2010). Inside The Wicker Man: How Not to Make a Cult Classic (Revised ed.). Edinburgh: Polygon. ISBN 978-1-846-97144-0.
- Catterall, Ali & Wells, Simon (2002). Your Face Here: British Cult Movies Since the Sixties. Fourth Estate. ISBN 9780007145546.
- Livingstone, David (2015). Transhumanism: The History of a Dangerous Idea. Sabilillah Publications. ISBN 978-1-515-23257-5.
- Murray, Andy; Rolston, Lorraine (2008). Studying the Wicker Man. Liverpool, England: Liverpool University Press. ISBN 978-1-903-66310-3.
- Rasmus, Agnieszka (2022). Hollywood Remakes of Iconic British Films: Class, Gender and Stardom. Edinburgh, Scotland: Edinburgh University Press. ISBN 978-1-474-44880-2.
- Simpson, Robert J. E. (2021). The Willing Fool: The Spectacle of The Wicker Man. Avalard Publishing. ISBN 978-1-908-56633-1.
- Wiggins, Steve A. (2023). The Wicker Man. Devil's Advocates. Liverpool, England: Liverpool University Press. ISBN 978-1-83764-388-2.
