= Anthony Shaffer (writer) =

English writer (1926–2001)

- Born: Anthony Joshua Shaffer; 15 May 1926; Liverpool, England
- Died: 6 November 2001 (aged 75); London, England
- Resting place: Highgate Cemetery, London
- Occupations: Playwright, screenwriter, novelist, barrister, advertising executive
- Spouse(s): Henrietta J. Glaskie (m. 1954, divorced) Carolyn Soley (divorced) Diane Cilento (m. 1985)
- Children: 2
- Relatives: Peter Shaffer (brother)

Anthony Joshua Shaffer (15 May 1926 – 6 November 2001) was an English playwright, screenwriter, novelist, barrister, and advertising executive. He is best remembered for his Tony Award winning play Sleuth (1970) and its acclaimed 1972 film adaptation. His screenplays included Alfred Hitchcock's thriller Frenzy (1972) and the folk horror film The Wicker Man (1973).

== Early life ==
Shaffer was born to a Jewish family in Liverpool, the son of Reka (née Fredman) and Jack Shaffer, who was an estate agent with his wife's family. He was the identical twin brother of writer and dramatist Peter Shaffer, and they had another brother, Brian. He was educated at St Paul's School, London, and read Law at Trinity College, Cambridge.

== Career ==
Shaffer worked as a barrister and advertising copywriter before becoming a full-time writer.

Shaffer's most notable work was the play Sleuth (1970), which won the Tony Award for Best Play. The play was later adapted for the film version starring Laurence Olivier and Michael Caine. He received Edgar Awards from the Mystery Writers of America for both versions: for Best Play in 1971, and Best Screenplay in 1973.

Shaffer's other major screenplays include the Hitchcock thriller Frenzy (1972) and the horror film The Wicker Man (1973). Its director, Robin Hardy, had previously set up a television production company wirh Shaffer called Hardy, Shaffer & Associates.

== Personal life ==
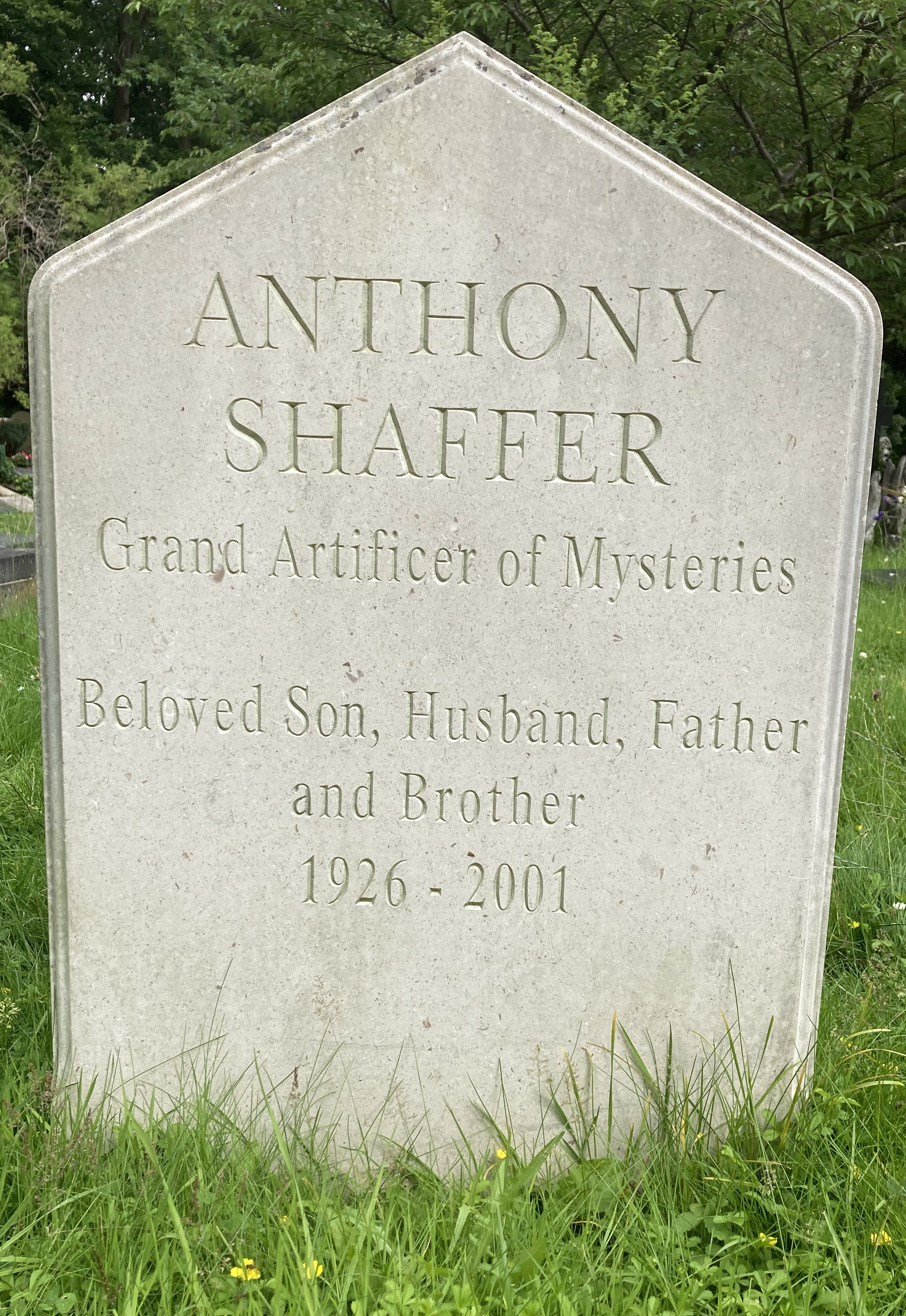
Grave of Anthony Shaffer in the east side of Highgate Cemetery

Shaffer was married three times – to Henrietta Glaskie, Carolyn Soley (with whom he had two children, Claudia and Cressida), and Australian actress Diane Cilento.

Shaffer met Cilento in 1973, when she appeared in The Wicker Man. He moved to Australia in 1975 and married Cilento in 1985. Together they built a house (The Castle) and a theatre (The Karnak Playhouse). Shaffer was legally domiciled in Australia (where he owned land and a restaurant, paid taxes and voted in elections), although he did maintain a flat in London.

In the last years of his life Shaffer had an extramarital relationship with Marie Josette "JoJo" Capece-Minutolo when in London. Cilento did not accompany Shaffer to England but remained in Australia. After Shaffer's death, Capece-Minutolo made a claim on his estate in the British High Court, arguing that Shaffer had intended to divorce Cilento and marry her and that he had given her an engagement ring. The Shaffer estate argued that Shaffer had no desire to end his marriage to Cilento. The judge found that despite Shaffer's being in "an intimate and loving relationship" with Capece in London, Shaffer and his estate were not legally domiciled in the United Kingdom at the time of his death, and that therefore Capece-Minutolo had no legal claims on his estate, other than any bequest in Shaffer's will, which had been changed in 1999.

== Bibliography ==
=== Novels ===
- Anthony, Peter (1951). Woman In The Wardrobe. British Library Crime Classics. ISBN 978-0712353465.
- Anthony, Peter (1952). How Doth The Little Crocodile. Evans Brothers Limited.
- Shaffer, A. & P. (1955). Withered Murder. Macmillan. ISBN 978-1135775995.
- Shaffer, A. & P. (1979). Absolution. Corgi Transworld Pub. ISBN 978-0552110822.
- Shaffer, Anthony; Hardy, Robin (1978). The Wicker Man. Crown Publishers. ISBN 978-0517532591.

=== Plays ===
- Shaffer, Anthony (1963). The Savage Parade. Amber Lane. ISBN 978-0906399873.
- Shaffer, Anthony (1970). Sleuth. S. French. ISBN 978-0573140198.
- Shaffer, Anthony (1975). Murderer: A Play in Two Acts. Marion Boyars Publishers, Ltd. ISBN 978-0714525440.
- Shaffer, Anthony (1977). Whodunnit. Samuel French, Ltd. ISBN 978-0714525440.
- Shaffer, Anthony (1986). Widow's Weeds or For Years I Couldn't Wear My Black. Samuel French, Inc. ISBN 978-0573690808.
- Shaffer, Anthony (2001). The Thing in the Wheelchair.

=== Memoir ===
- Shaffer, Anthony (2001). So What Did You Expect?: A Memoir. Picador. ISBN 978-0330390439.

== Filmography ==
Year	Title	Role	Notes
1971	Mr. Forbush and the Penguins	Screenwriter	a.k.a. Cry of the Penguins
1972	Frenzy	Screenwriter	
1972	Sleuth	Screenwriter	
1973	The Wicker Man	Screenwriter	
1974	Murder on the Orient Express	Screenwriter	Uncredited
1978	Death on the Nile	Screenwriter	
1978	Absolution	Screenwriter	
1980	Rough Cut	Screenwriter	Uncredited
1982	Evil Under the Sun	Screenwriter	Co-Writer
1988	Appointment with Death	Screenwriter	Co-Writer
1993	Sommersby	Screenwriter	Co-Writer

== Television ==
Year	Title	Role	Notes
1969	Pig In The Middle	Writer	Broadcast by Harlech Television (HTV)
