= List of castles in Lithuania =

Most of Lithuania's early castles were wooden and have not survived. Those that remain are of stone and brick construction dating from the 13th century onwards.

== List of castles and castle ruins in Lithuania ==
Image	Name	Construction date	Location	Current state
	Baltadvaris Castle	16th century	Baltadvaris	Ruins
	Biržai Castle	1586	Biržai	Rebuilt
	Dubingiai Castle	1412–1413	Dubingiai	Ruins
	Vaitkuškis Palace	18th century	Vaitkuškis	Partially rebuilt
	Eišiškės Castle	15th century	Eišiškės	Ruins
	Kaunas Castle	14th century	Kaunas	Partially rebuilt
	Klaipėda Castle	13th century	Klaipėda	Partially rebuilt
	Medininkai Castle	13th–14th centuries	Medininkai	Rebuilt
	Norviliškės Castle	16th century	Norviliškės	Rebuilt
	Panemunė Castle	17th century	Vytėnai	Partially rebuilt
	Raudondvaris Castle	17th century	Raudondvaris	Rebuilt
	Raudonė Castle	16th century	Raudonė	Rebuilt
	Rokantiškės Castle	16th century	Naujoji Vilnia	Ruins
	Siesikai Castle	16th century	Siesikai	Rebuilt
	Senieji Trakai Castle	14th century	Senieji Trakai	Ruins
	Trakai Island Castle	14th century	Trakai	Rebuilt
	Trakai Peninsula Castle	14th century	Trakai	Partially rebuilt
	Tauragė Castle	1844–1866	Tauragė	Refurbished
	Vilnius Castle Complex	14th century	Vilnius	Partially rebuilt

== See also ==
- List of castles in Belarus
- List of castles in Poland
- List of castles in Ukraine
- List of castles in Latvia
- List of castles in Estonia
- List of hillforts in Lithuania
- List of hillforts in Latvia
- List of palaces and manor houses in Latvia
- List of palaces and manor houses in Estonia
- List of palaces and manor houses in Lithuania
- List of castles
