= Empire (Kasabian album) =

Studio album by Kasabian
- Released: 28 August 2006
- Recorded: February 2006
- Genres: Indie rock; psychedelic rock; electronic rock; glam rock
- Length: 39:24
- Labels: Paradise, RCA
- Producers: Jim Abbiss, Kasabian

Kasabian chronology
Kasabian (2004)	Empire (2006)	West Ryder Pauper Lunatic Asylum (2009)

Singles from Empire
- 1. "Empire" Released: 24 July 2006; 2. "Shoot the Runner" Released: 6 November 2006; 3. "Me Plus One" Released: 29 January 2007

Empire is the second studio album by British rock band Kasabian, released on 28 August 2006. The album peaked at No. 1 on the UK Albums Chart and was preceded by the release of the title track single "Empire" on 24 July 2006.

According to Tom Meighan in an interview on the album with the NME in early 2006, "Empire" is a word used by the band to describe something that is good. As of 3 May 2017 the album has sold over 800,000 copies in the band's home country of the UK.

Empire was the first full Kasabian album to feature drummer Ian Matthews, who was recruited in 2005. Lead songwriter and guitarist Christopher Karloff left the band in early 2006, during recording of the album, having contributed the music for three tracks.

== Composition ==
=== Tracks ===
The album opens with the title track, beginning with a recording left on one of the band members' mobile phone answering services. The song features a prominent string section and has drawn comparisons to The Killers and Slade, and incorporates a bridge with a sound collage and backing vocals from Joana Glaza (then-of Joana and the Wolf). "Shoot The Runner" is a glam rock song in swing time which features Tom Meighan and Sergio Pizzorno trading lead vocals, as well as a Euro-disco style bridge. "Last Trip (In Flight)" was regarded as "Beatles-in-Marrakech psychedelia", followed by the sunshine pop track "Me Plus One", featuring Pizzorno on lead vocals.

"Sun Rise Light Flies" has been compared to "L.S.F" from the band's debut album, with a faster tempo, strings and "airy vocals" from Meighan and Pizzorno. The brief track "Apnoea", deriving its name from sleep apnea was labelled as having a 'lego-techno instrumental'. "By My Side", one of the few tracks to feature writing credits from Christopher Karloff was described as "a memorable, lush tune that suggests what it would sound like if James Bond film themes had proper B-sides". "Stuntman" has a strong rave influence, starting off with a "hard and fast dance beat and then adds keys and a fantastic rhythm section to it". In 2009, it was included on the compilation album Brand Neu!, citing its influence from the krautrock band Neu!.

The penultimate track "British Legion" is an acoustic ballad showcasing the band's "surprisingly tender gentle side", featuring Pizzorno on lead vocals and bassist Chris Edwards playing a Wurlitzer piano. The closing track "The Doberman" was highly praised by critics, considered an "epic, Morricone-tinged closer" and compared to a "big-budget season finale" that opens with "country-tinged guitars" and "builds and builds with a retro-tinged hippie feel", featuring a time signature change at its climax topped off with a trumpet solo by Gary Alesbrook, who would become a regular recording and touring member of the band after the album's release.

== Critical reception ==
Professional ratings
Aggregate scores
Source	Rating
Metacritic	65/100
Review scores
Source	Rating
AllMusic	3/5 stars
Boston Phoenix	2/5 stars
Entertainment.ie	2/5 stars
The Guardian	3/5 stars
The Independent	link
NME	9/10
PopMatters	6/10 stars
Q	(#243, Oct. 2006, p. 116)
Rolling Stone	1/5 stars
Sputnikmusic	3.5/5.0

Empire received mixed-to-positive reviews. Music critics were divided by the band's choices in production and lyricism, despite many considering them better than their self-titled debut. At Metacritic, which assigns a normalised rating out of 100 to reviews from mainstream critics, the album received an average score of 65, based on 20 reviews.

Dan Martin of NME found the album better than their self-titled debut, praising the band for mixing all their influences into tracks that can be called their own, saying that: "Through sheer, bloody-minded relief, weapons-graded stamina and a big, big imagination, Kasabian have willed themselves into brilliance." Jason MacNeil of PopMatters found some production choices on the tracks off-putting but said that Empire shows the band's potential of crafting better projects in their given ilk, concluding that: "On the whole, it’s a good second step, but hopefully step three is more in line with the shock and awe the first album contained." Chris Salmon of The Guardian noted that Kasabian's boastful talk of the album resulted in a mixed bag of tracks that fall just shy of their claim, in terms of influenced production and lyricism, saying that: "While Empire isn't an exceptional record, it offers enough to be described as a good one."

AllMusic's David Jeffries commended the band for taking a grand-scale approach to mixing their influences into an Oasis-sized project, but felt they forgot to write catchy tracks to lead the album, saying that: "Lost in all this is the instantly grabbing songwriting of Kasabian's debut, and to some extent, the bandmembers themselves, who often seem to be riding this swirl instead of guiding it." Despite praising a few tracks, Lauren Murphy of Entertainment.ie felt the album was just a retread of their debut with Tom Meighan's vocals starting to sound strained throughout, concluding with: "If Kasabian hadn't attempted to build their Empire by recounting its wonderment prematurely, it might have stood a chance; instead, their audacity just proves them to be, unsurprisingly, more geezer, less Caesar." Peter Relic of Rolling Stone criticized the album for sounding like a rehash of established British rock bands and Meighan for having weak vocal delivery on the tracks, calling it "miles worse than their shallow but tasty first, its big-budget production only making its shortcomings more apparent."

== Track listing ==
All lyrics are written by Sergio Pizzorno; all music is composed by Pizzorno, except where noted.

No.	Title	Music	Length
1.	"Empire"	Pizzorno, Christopher Karloff	3:53
2.	"Shoot the Runner"		3:27
3.	"Last Trip (In Flight)"		2:53
4.	"Me Plus One"		2:28
5.	"Sun Rise Light Flies"		4:08
6.	"Apnoea"		1:48
7.	"By My Side"	Pizzorno, Karloff	4:14
8.	"Stuntman"	Pizzorno, Karloff	5:19
9.	"Seek & Destroy"		2:15
10.	"British Legion"		3:19
11.	"The Doberman"		5:34

US iTunes Store bonus tracks
No.	Title	Length
12.	"Ketang" (Bonus Track)	2:11
13.	"Heroes (David Bowie cover)" (David Bowie, Brian Eno) (Bonus Track)	2:30
14.	"Empire" (Video)	4:52
15.	"Empire" (Commentary) (Bonus Video)	9:43

European iTunes Store bonus tracks
No.	Title	Length
12.	"Shoot the Runner" (Live from XFM)	5:21
13.	"Reason Is Treason" (Live from XFM)	4:52
14.	"Empire" (Live from XFM)	4:00
15.	"The Doberman" (Live from XFM)	5:52
16.	"L.S.F. (Lost Souls Forever)" (Live from XFM)	6:25

Special Edition Bonus DVD
No.	Title	Length
1.	"Empire" (Video)
2.	"Empire" (Documentary)
3.	"Empire" (Making of)

Japan Only Bonus Tracks
No.	Title	Length
12.	"Stuntman" (Live from the Radio One Zane Lowe Session)
13.	"Empire" (Homecoming with XFM)
14.	"Shoot the Runner" (Homecoming with XFM)
15.	"Me Plus One" (Homecoming with XFM)
16.	"Last Trip (In Flight)" (Homecoming with XFM)

Japan Only Bonus DVD
No.	Title	Length
1.	"Empire" (Video)
2.	"Empire" (Making of)
3.	"Empire" (Live at 4Music Presents)
4.	"Shoot the Runner" (Video)
5.	"Shoot the Runner" (Video - Pre-animation)
6.	"Shoot the Runner" (Live at 4Music Presents)
7.	"Stuntman" (Live at 4Music Presents)
8.	"By My Side" (Live at 4Music Presents)

On digital editions, "Sun Rise Light Flies" is styled as "Sun/Rise/Light/Flies" or "Sun / Rise / Light / Flies".

== Personnel ==
Adapted from the Empire liner notes.

Kasabian

- Tom Meighan – lead vocals (tracks 1–3, 5–7, 9, 11), backing vocals (tracks 4, 8)
- Sergio Pizzorno – guitars, synthesizers, backing vocals, lead vocals (tracks 2, 4, 8, 10)
- Chris Edwards – bass, wurlitzer piano (on "British Legion")
- Ian Matthews – drums, percussion

Additional musicians

- Joana Glaza – backing vocals (track 1)
- Farhat Bouallagui – violin and viola (tracks 1, 4, 5, 11)
- Bouzid Ezzedine – violin (tracks 1, 4, 5, 11)
- Jazzer Haj Youssef – violin (tracks 1, 4, 5, 11)
- James Banbury – cello (track 7)
- Jo Archard – violin (track 7)
- Fiona McCapra – violin (track 7)
- Vince Greene – viola (track 7)
- Nick Attwood – trombone (track 2)
- Craig Crofton – saxophone (track 2)
- Gary Alesbrook – trumpet (track 11)

Technical personnel

- Jim Abbiss, Kasabian – production
- Barny – recording, mixing (tracks 6, 8–10)
- "Beatle Ben" – recording assistant
- Owen Skinner – mixing assistant (tracks 6, 8–10)
- Andy Wallace – mixing (tracks 1–5, 7, 11)
- Jean-Loup Morette – strings engineering (tracks 1, 4, 5, 11)
- George Marino – mastering
- Julie Verhoeven – illustrations
- Andy Hayes – design and layout

== Charts and certifications ==
=== Weekly charts ===
Chart (2006)	Peak position
Australian Albums (ARIA)	67
Austrian Albums (Ö3 Austria)	64
French Albums (SNEP)	56
German Albums (Offizielle Top 100)	68
Irish Albums (IRMA)	3
Italian Albums (FIMI)	40
Japanese Albums (Oricon)	8
New Zealand Albums (RMNZ)	19
Swiss Albums (Schweizer Hitparade)	47
UK Albums (Official Charts)	1
US Billboard 200	114

=== Year-end charts ===
Chart (2006)	Position
UK Albums (OCC)	43
Chart (2007)	Position
UK Albums (OCC)	87

=== Certifications ===
Region	Certification	Certified units/sales
United Kingdom (BPI)	2× Platinum	803,000
