= Wawrzyniec Cezary Anichini =

Italian architect

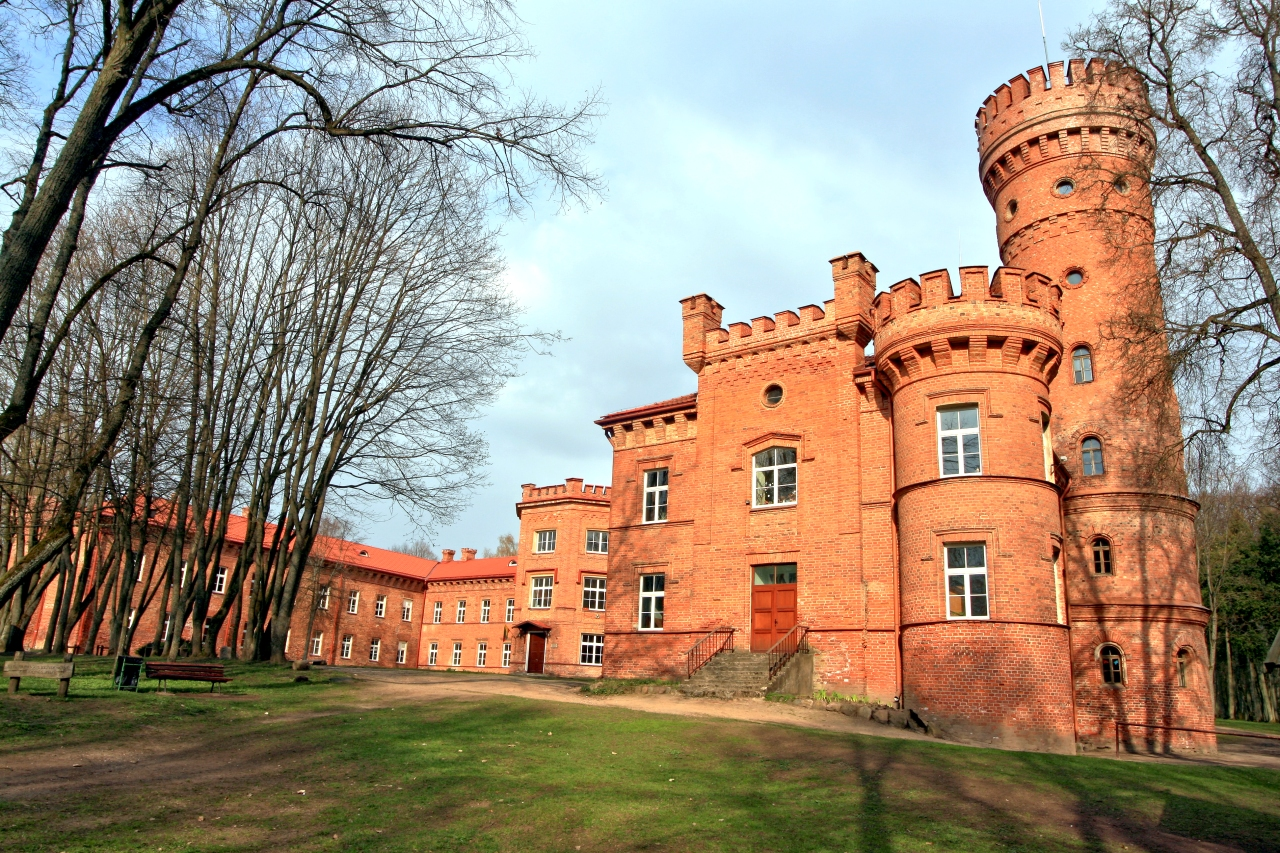
Raudonė Castle reconstructed by Anichini in 1854

Wawrzyniec Cezary Anichini (born Cesare Anighini; 1787 in Florence – January 31, 1861, in Raudondvaris) was an Italian architect, active mostly in what is now the Republic of Lithuania.

Anichini arrived to the lands of the former Russian Empire in 1812 as an engineer within Napoleon's Grande Armée. Following Napoleon's defeat in the Russian Empire he was captured as prisoner of war. Released by the Russians he settled in Vilna (modern Vilnius) together with yet another Italian expatriate, Franciszek Andriolli (a sculptor and father of Michał Elwiro Andriolli). With time he polonised his surname and signed most his projects as Cezary Anichini.

Throughout most of his later life he served as an architect of the mighty Tyszkiewicz family. Among the most notable works are the reconstruction of Raudonė Castle, construction of churches in Raudondvaris (did not survive) and Biržai, and park of the Raudondvaris Castle.
