= Viljandi Folk Music Festival =

Estonian music festival

Coordinates: 58°21′32.84″N 025°35′43.16″E

Viljandi folk music festival
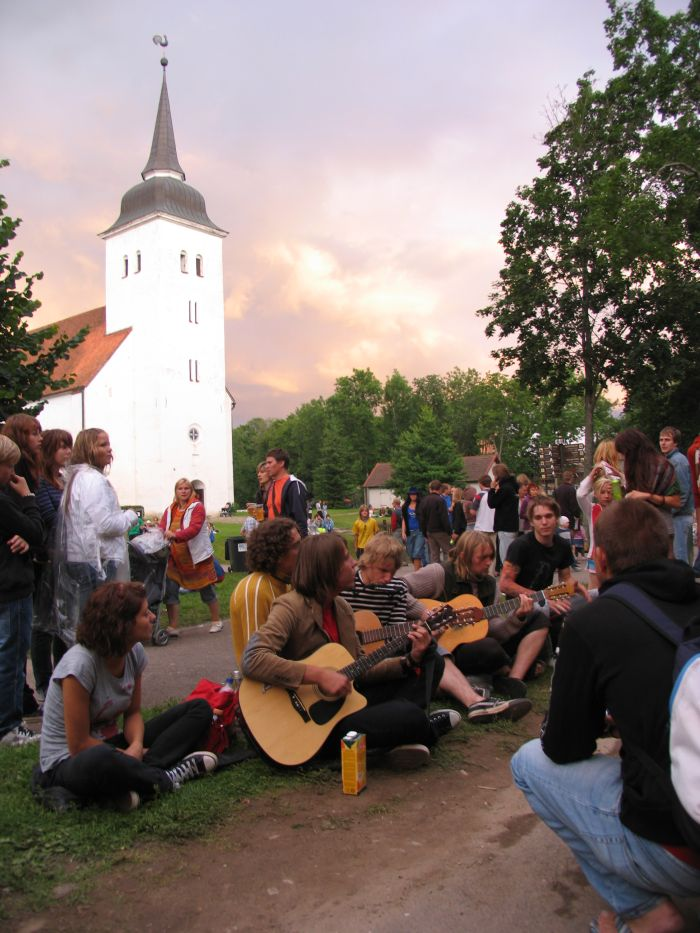
- Genre: Folk music, Folk rock, World music.
- Dates: Four days, Thursday to Sunday at the end of July.
- Locations: Viljandi, Estonia
- Years active: 1993–present

The Viljandi Folk Music Festival is a music festival in Estonia with a central focus on European folk music. It is traditionally held during the last weekend of July, when the otherwise quiet city of Viljandi is completely transformed as the small city center is suddenly flooded with people. The main attraction of the festival is the friendly atmosphere. Over 25,000 people attend the concerts every year, but many more just come to take part in the festivities. As such, it is the largest annual music festival in Estonia, and one of the largest folk music festivals in Europe.

== Highlights of past festivals ==
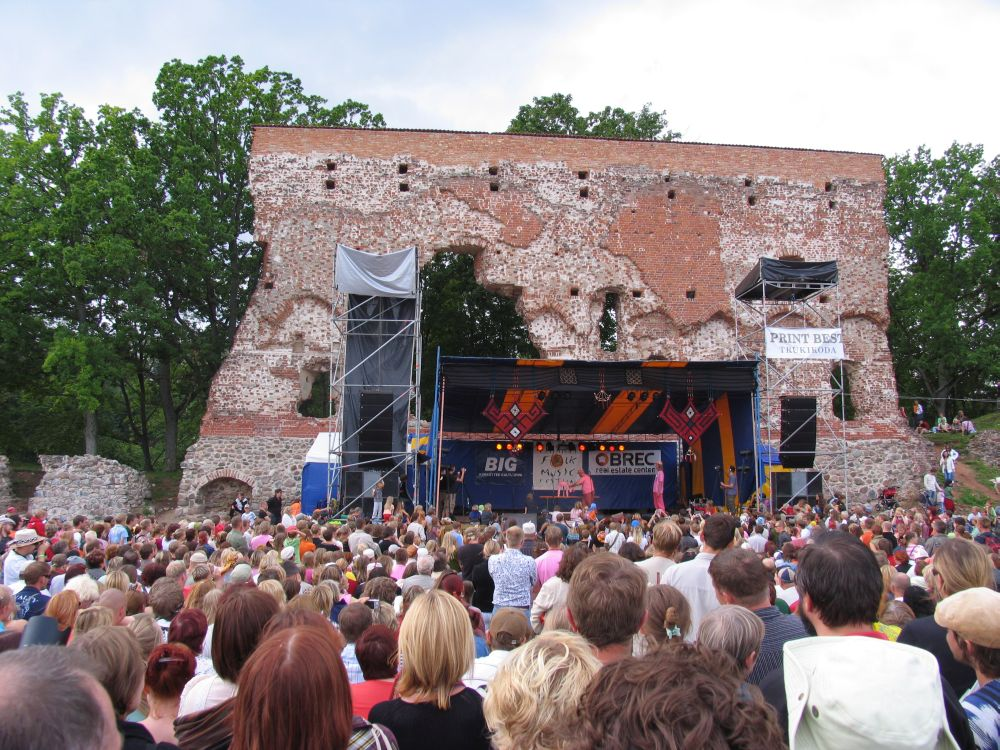
The 2007 Viljandi festival

- IX Viljandi Folk Music Festival July 26–29, 2001.
  Headlined by Yat-Kha (Tuva), Väsen (Sweden), Fluxus (Belgium), Gerry O'Connor & Desi Wilkinson (Ireland).
- X Viljandi Folk Music Festival July 25–28, 2002.
  Headlined by Talitha MacKenzie (Scotland), Gjallarhorn (Finland), Atalyja (Lithuania), Fanfara de la Chetris (Romania).
- XI Viljandi Folk Music Festival July 24–27, 2003.
  Headlined by Haydamaky (Ukraine), Värttinä (Finland), Galldubh (Ireland), Romano Drom (Hungary), Alberto Gutierrez et Maquinolandela (Cuba).
- XII Viljandi Folk Music Festival July 22–25, 2004.
  Headlined by Esma Redzepova (Macedonia), Esta (Israel), JPP (Finland), Mary Youngblood (USA), Dorsa (Northern Ireland), and BuB (Belgium).
- XIII Viljandi Folk Music Festival July 28–31, 2005.
  Headlined by Brolum (Scotland), Henrik Jansberg Quartet (Denmark), Fiddlesong (Canada), Osimira (Belarus).
- XIV Viljandi Folk Music Festival July 20–23, 2006.
  Headlined by Altan (Ireland), Filska (Shetland islands), Evgenij Genev & Balkan Folk Acoustic (Bulgaria), Csik Band (Hungary), Tummel (Sweden)
