= Norviliškės Castle =

Coordinates: 54°14′11″N 25°46′54″E

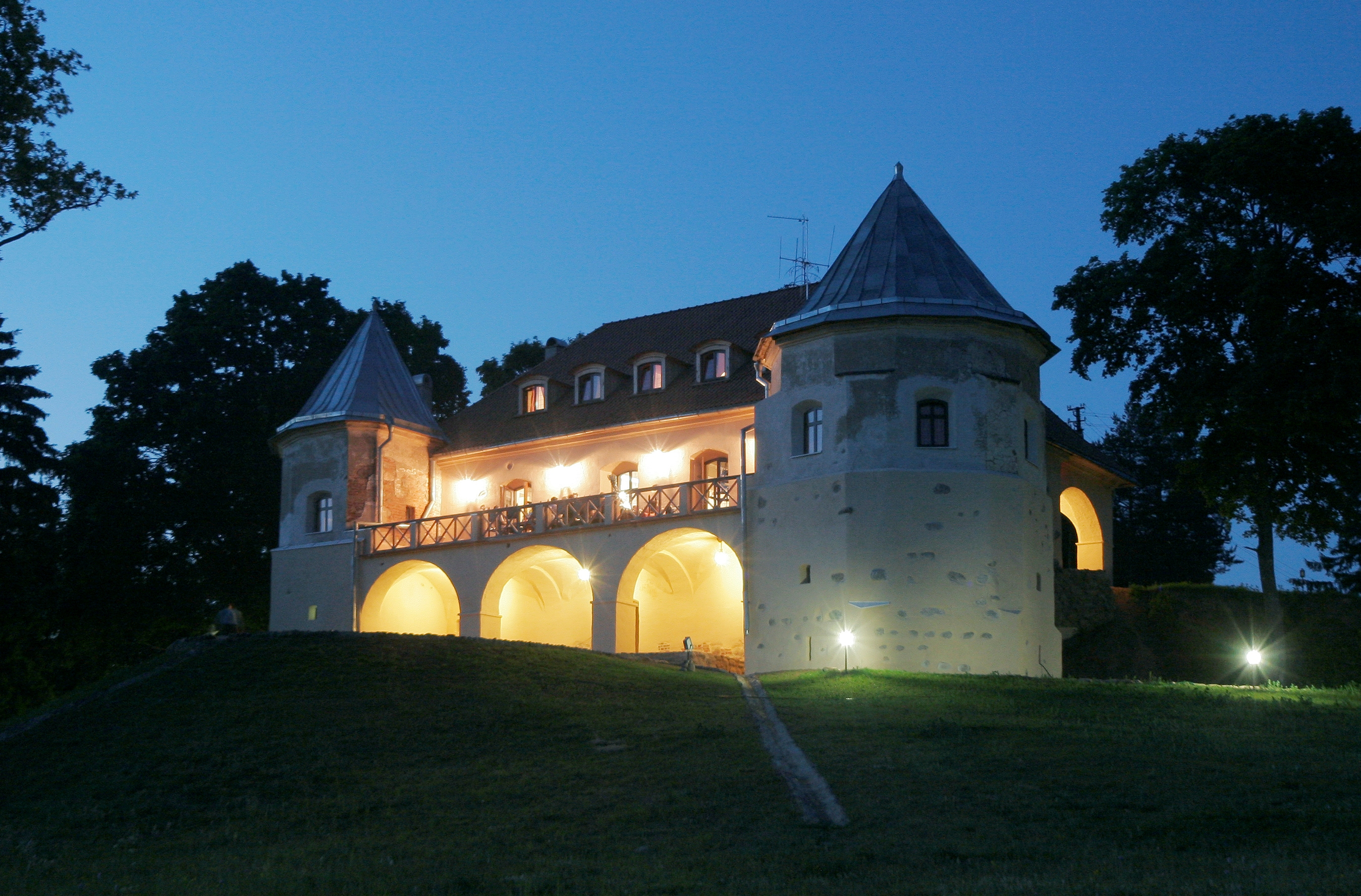
Norviliškės Castle

Norviliškės Castle (Lithuanian: Norviliškių pilis), also called Norviliškės Manor (Lithuanian: Norviliškių dvaras) is a Renaissance style castle and a former monastery in Norviliškės, Lithuania. The Norviliškės Castle is first mentioned in 1586. In 1617 the owners donated part of the real estate land to Franciscans. Around 1745 they built a monastery and a church in Renaissance style. The monastery was reconstructed at the end of the 18th century by Kazimieras Kaminskis. After the November Uprising of 1831, Russian authorities closed the monastery and turned it into barracks for soldiers, and later to a boarding school for girls. The Church of St. Mary Compassionate Mother was closed at the same time as the monastery. A new wooden church was built in 1929.

For a long time the former manor stood abandoned. In 2005, reconstruction was started by an entrepreneur, Giedrius Klimkevičius, from Vilnius. The project is supported by funds from the PHARE program. The hopes are that the Norviliškės Castle will become a tourist attraction. It offers hosting for business conferences or weddings, hunting, shooting practices, and other activities, including music festival Be2gether.

== See also ==
- List of castles in Lithuania
