= Me Plus One (Kasabian song) =

Single by Kasabian

from the album Empire
- B-side: "Somebody to Love"
- Released: 29 January 2007
- Genre: Sunshine pop; raga rock
- Length: 2:28
- Label: RCA
- Songwriter: Sergio Pizzorno
- Producers: Jim Abbiss, Kasabian

Kasabian singles chronology
"Shoot the Runner" (2006)	"Me Plus One" (2007)	"Fire" (2009)

"Me Plus One" is a song by English rock band Kasabian and is the fourth track on their second album, Empire (2006). The song was released on 29 January 2007 as the third single from that album in the United Kingdom, placing at number 22 on the UK Singles Chart a week later. It was the first Kasabian single to feature guitarist, chief songwriter and band leader Sergio Pizzorno on lead vocals before Tom Meighan's departure from the band in 2020, with the second being "Bow" in 2014 and the third being "Are You Looking For Action?" in 2017.

== Video ==
The music video is viewable on the band's website when the title of the song is typed in on the text box, below the video player. A different version of the video was aired as the original one had nudity. The video was directed by Scott Lyon.

== Track listings ==
- 2-track CD PARADISE47
1. "Me Plus One" – 2:28
2. "Somebody to Love" (Radio 1 Live Lounge Version) - 2:48
- Maxi-CD PARADISE48
1. "Me Plus One" – 2:28
2. "Me Plus One" (Jacques Lu Cont Mix) - 8:36
3. "Caught in Her Mind" (Paradise Remix)
4. "Me Plus One" (video)
  - The uncensored director's cut version of the video.
- 10-inch vinyl PARADISE49
1. "Me Plus One (Jacques Lu Cont Mix)" - 8:36
2. "Me Plus One (Jacques Lu Cont Dub)" - 8:21
3. "Me Plus One" – 2:28

== Personnel ==
Kasabian

- Sergio Pizzorno – lead vocals, acoustic guitar, keyboards
- Tom Meighan – backing vocals
- Chris Edwards – bass
- Ian Matthews – drums

Additional personnel

- Farhat Bouallagui – violin, viola
- Bouzid Ezzedine – violin
- Jazzer Haj Youssef – violin
