= Raudonė Castle =

Coordinates: 55°05′48″N 23°07′50″E

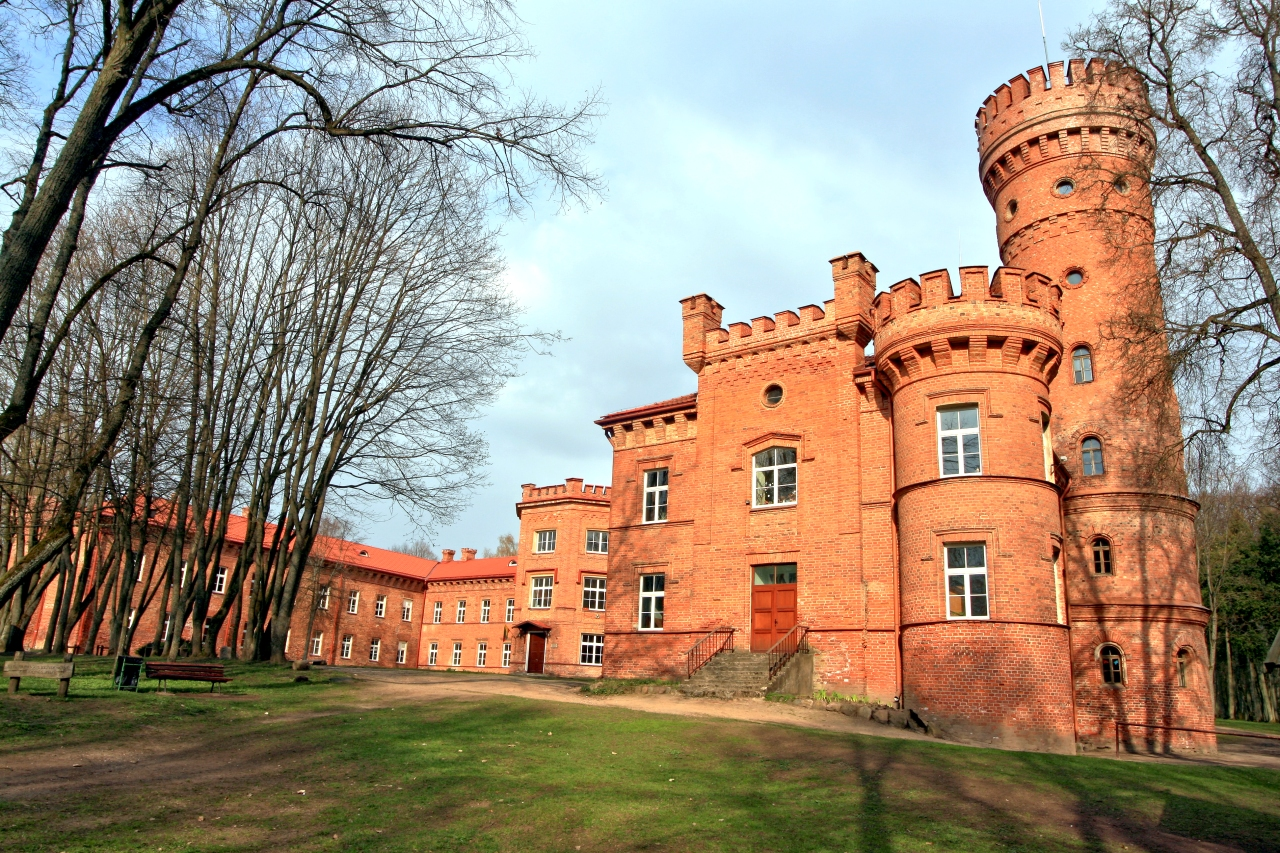
Raudonė castle

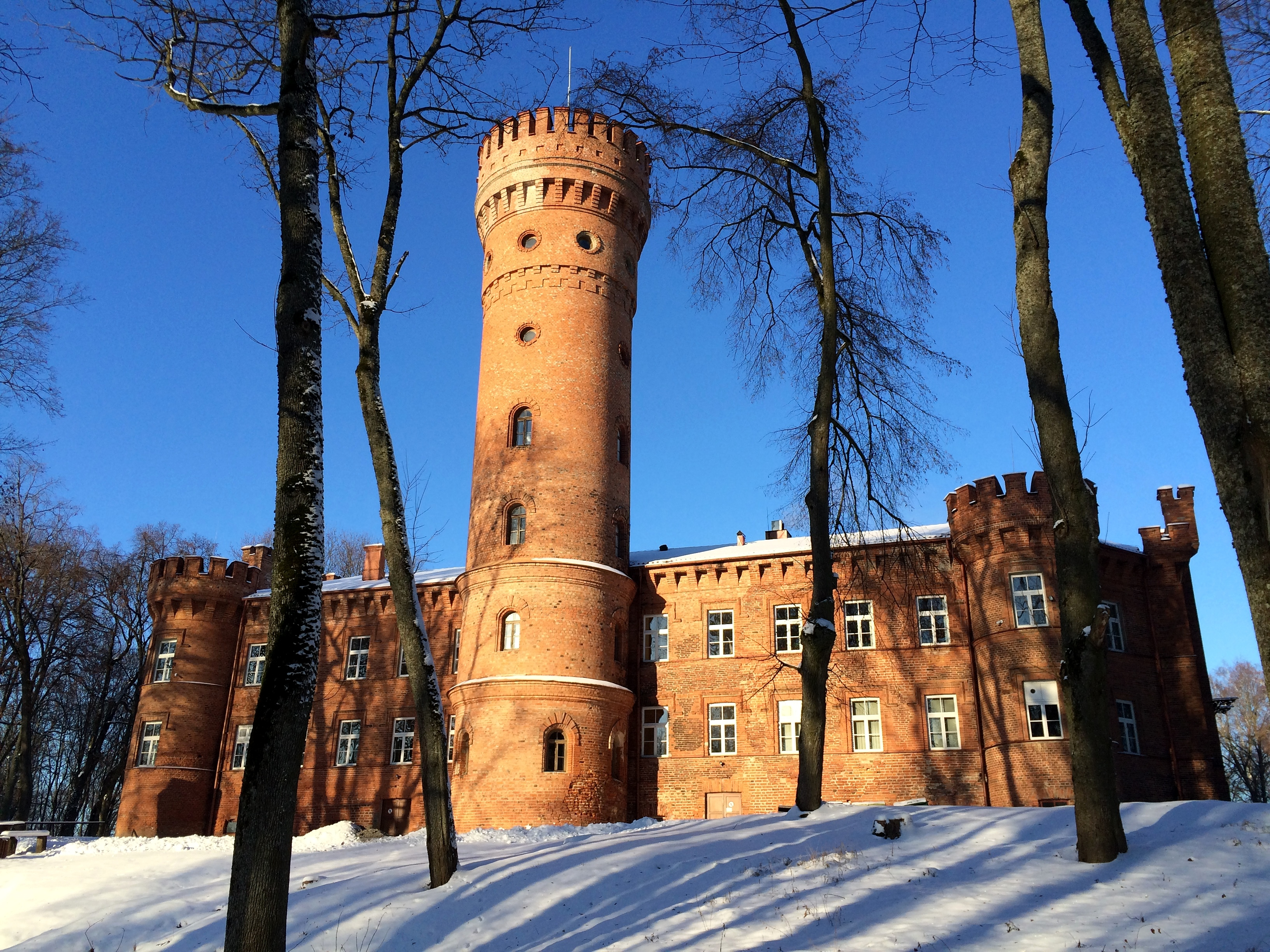
The Tower of Raudonė Castle in winter

Raudonė Castle is a residential castle (estate, manor) of the 19th century in Raudonė, Lithuania.It was used as a public school, but has since become something more like an art gallery/museum.

== History ==
Bayersburg II Castle, an old Teutonic castle, stood here until the 16th century. The original castle is the setting of an East Prussian legend known as "The White Maiden of the Bayersburg". Raudonė was a royal manor, which Grand Duke Sigismund II August gave to Prussian merchant Krispin Kirschenstein. He built a Renaissance style manor house with a 110-foot (34 m) cylindrical tower on the grounds of the old castle at the end of the 16th century.

The 18th-century owners of the Raudonė estate, the Olędzki (Olendskiai) family, members of Szlachta (Polish-Lithuanian nobility), commissioned Laurynas Stuoka-Gucevičius to renovate the castle. The next owner, the Russian Prince Platon Zubov, acquired the estate in the first half of the 19th century and his family transformed the castle yet again. Their architect was Cesare Anichini. The Neo-Gothic style building was built in 1877 as part of the castle building complex. It was used as a warehouse and a living place for servants. In 1923, the building was turned into mill. Today the whole complex is an example of 19th-century Neo-Gothic architecture. The last owner of the castle from 1898 to 1937, was Sophia Waxell, a granddaughter of Sophia von Pirch-Kaiserov who was the niece of Platon Zubov, and her husband from Madeira, José (Juozas) Carlos de Faria e Castro. After the early death of Sophia, the castle belonged to her husband, later on to her only son, Joseph Carlo de Faria e Castro, and his wife Olga Kordashevski and their children Nikolai, Vladimir, and Alexander. In 1937 the castle became the property of the National Bank of Lithuania.

The castle is surrounded by an old park, in which rare trees grow: the silver fir, Swiss pine, grey walnut, line with nine trunks, Gediminas Oak. The Gediminas Oak, under which according to a legend the Grand Duke of Lithuania Gediminas had a lunch, is no longer putting out leaves. The tower is open to the public as an observation tower of Nemunas valley.

== Gallery ==
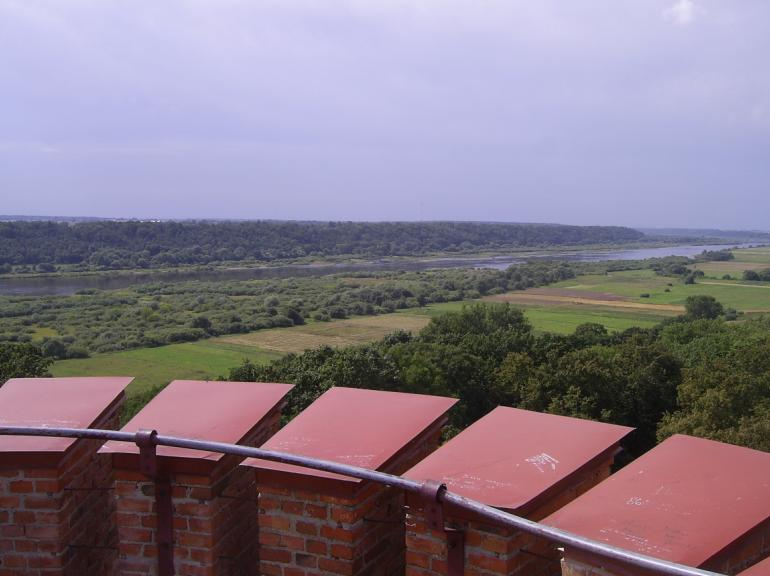
View of Nemunas Valley from the Raudonė Castle

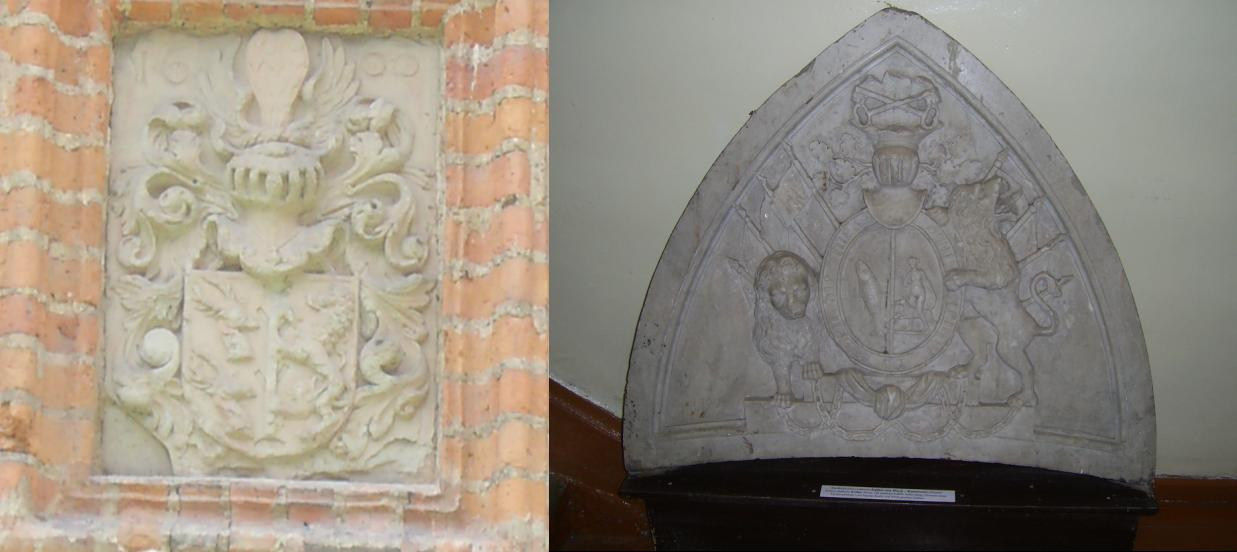
Original coat of arms of owners of the Raudonė Castle Krispin-Kirschenstein and Sophia von Pirch-Kaiserov

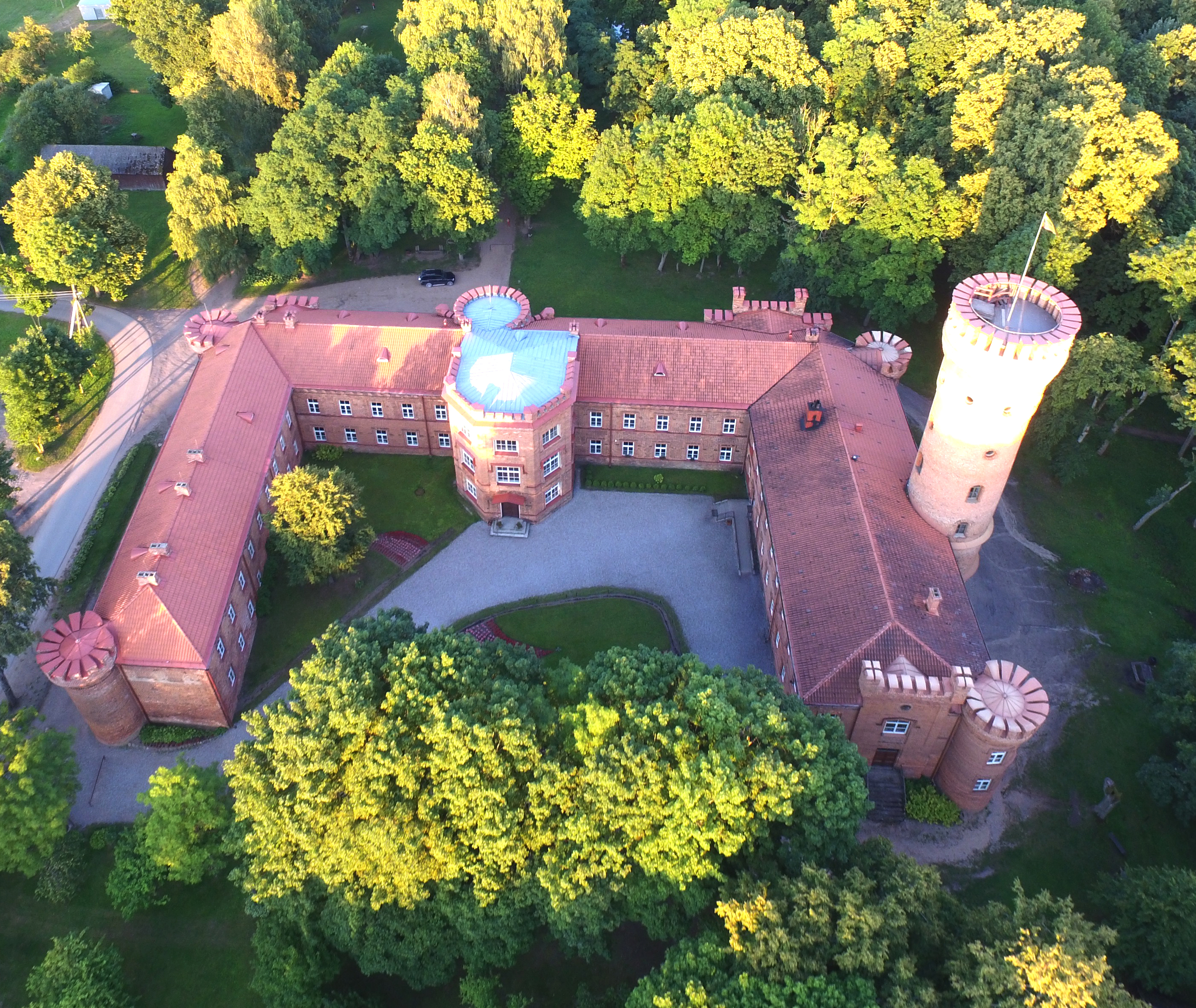
Aerial shot of Radaune Castle

== See also ==
- List of castles in Lithuania
