= Be2gether =

Music and arts festival held in Lithuania

Coordinates: 54°14′5″N 25°46′55″E

- Genre: Alternative, Pop, World, Electronic
- Dates: 24–26 August 2007; 14–17 August 2008; 12–14 June 2009; 25–27 June 2010
- Locations: Norviliškės, Lithuania
- Years active: 2007–2010
- Founders: Giedrius Klimkevičius

Be2gether or B2G was the largest annual music and arts festival in Baltic countries. Established in 2007, it took place in Norviliškės, Lithuania, just a few meters from the border with Belarus. In 2007, attendance was estimated at around 7,000–8,000 people, with an increase to 12,000 in 2008.

== Background ==
Be2gether was created with the slogan "Music Opens Borders", to emphasise the importance of connection despite any differences in culture, nationality, age or social position. To underscore this goal, the festival is held in the so-called Dieveniškės panhandle: Lithuanian territory surrounded by Belarus on three sides. The area is remote and is difficult to reach, due to Lithuania being a member of the European Union and Belarus not. In 2008, efforts were made to ensure that Belarusians could receive the needed visas without a fee if they traveled to the festival. Due to the festival's proximity to the state border, additional security measures have to be undertaken to prevent people from inadvertently crossing the border. The festival is situated in the historic Vilnius Region, inhabited by peoples of Lithuanian, Polish, Belarusian, Russian nationalities. The Renaissance Norviliškės Castle reminds the visitors of shared history under the Grand Duchy of Lithuania.

Many different genres make appearances at the Be2gether festival, including rock, electronic, world and alternative music. The festival invites mostly international bands. In addition to musical performances, the festival offers other activities, including craft studios, open air cinema, sport games, music and dance lessons, and a sculpture park. Children are offered daycare alongside their own activities.

== 2007 ==
The first festival was supported by two large scenes and club tent. Part of the money gained from tickets selling was donated to children from Chachersk, injured by the nuclear disaster at the Chernobyl Nuclear Power Plant. A DVD of the first festival was distributed with tickets for Be2gether in 2008. The festival boasted performances by 32 artists, including:

- Morcheeba
- Bloodhound Gang
- Therapy?
- The Young Knives
- Andrius Mamontovas
- Datarock
- Zion Train
- Leaves
- Joana and the Wolf
- Tribes of the City
- Poets of the Fall
- New York Ska Jazz Ensemble
- Myslovitz
- Skamp
- Pieno lazeriai
- G&G Sindikatas
- Tanel Padar & The Sun
- Radioshow
- Lyapis Trubetskoy

== 2008 ==
On August 14, Be2gether 2008 started in Vilnius, with a rally to support Georgia in 2008 South Ossetia war. The festival then moved to Norviliškės Castle grounds ready for main performances on August 15 and 16., with the festival concluding on August 17. Around 70 performers took part in the festival, including:

- Groove Armada
- Tricky
- Infected Mushroom
- Fishbone
- Etienne De Crecy
- Fools Garden
- My Baby Wants To Eat Your Pussy
- LTJ Bukem & MC Conrad
- Freeform Five
- Clan of Xymox
- Zdob Si Zdub
- Bix
- Clinic
- Girls Against Boys
- Baka Beyond
- Happyendless
- Valgeir Sigurdsson
- Communic
- N.R.M.
- Osimira
- Cool Kids of Death
- Skylė
- Stearica
- Los Aslandticos
- General Midi (DJ)

== 2009 ==
The third festival Be2gether was held on June 12–14, 2009. Be2gether 2009 included such bands as:

- Gogol Bordello
- K984
- Dilated Peoples
- Polarkreis 18
- Touch and Go
- Clawfinger
- Bedwetters
- G&G Sindikatas
- Airija
- Lyapis Trubetskoy

== 2010 ==
The fourth festival was held on June 25–27, 2010. Be2gether announced that performing bands will include:

- Australian electronic music duo Empire of The Sun
- British rock band Skunk Anansie
- Danish electronic rock trio WhoMadeWho
- Norwegian synthpop group Casiokids
- Ukrainian folk group Haydamaky
- Austrian beatboxing group Bauchklang
- English rapper Roots Manuva
- Anglo-Spanish electronic band Crystal Fighters
- Belarusian indie pop group Open Space

== Bans ==
Buses with festival guests in 2008 were held up on the Belarusian side.
