= Osimira =

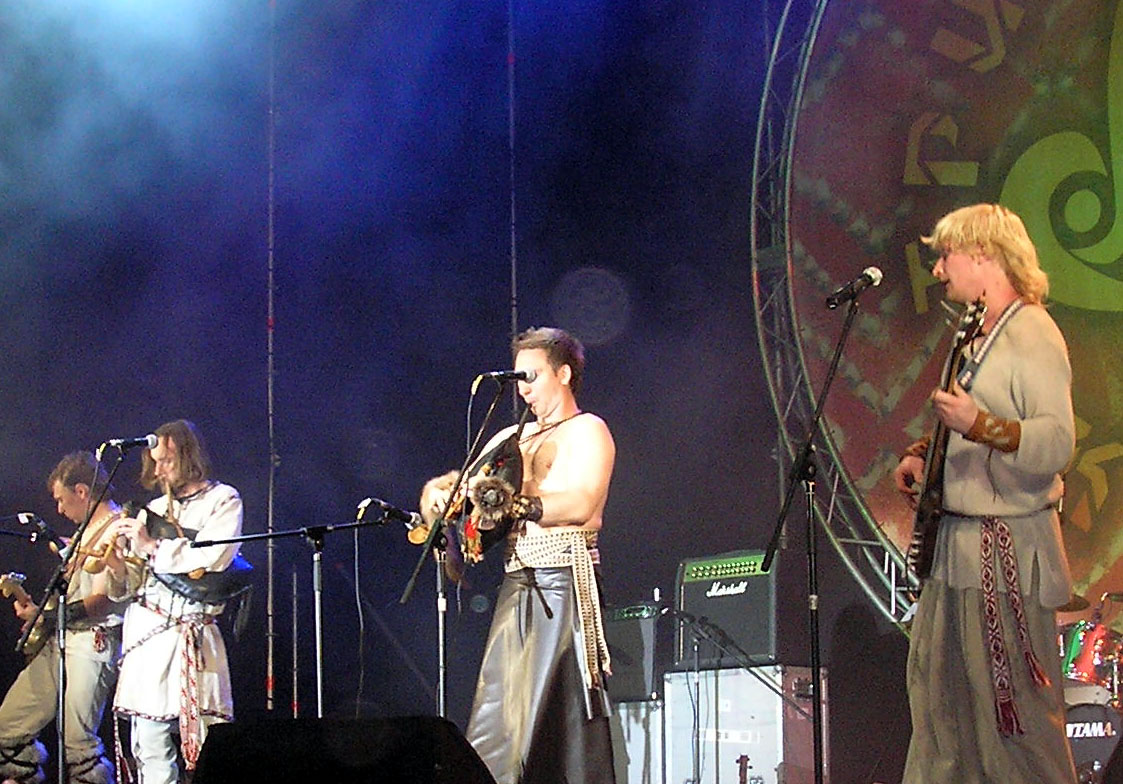
- The band Osimira at Trypilske kolo 2010

Background information
- Origin: Belarus
- Genres: Folk music
- Years active: 2002

Osimira is a Belarusian musical ethno-project, formed in 2002.

== Musicians ==
- Konstantin Kontsewoj - bagpipes, surma, sopilka, horn
- Ilya Dolzhenkov - bass guitar
- Katerina Donda - violin
- Alexei Palaichnya - drums
- Andrei Bindasov - percussion instruments
- Andriej Pałajczenia - vocals, flutes, bagpipes, percussion instruments, domra, kaliuka

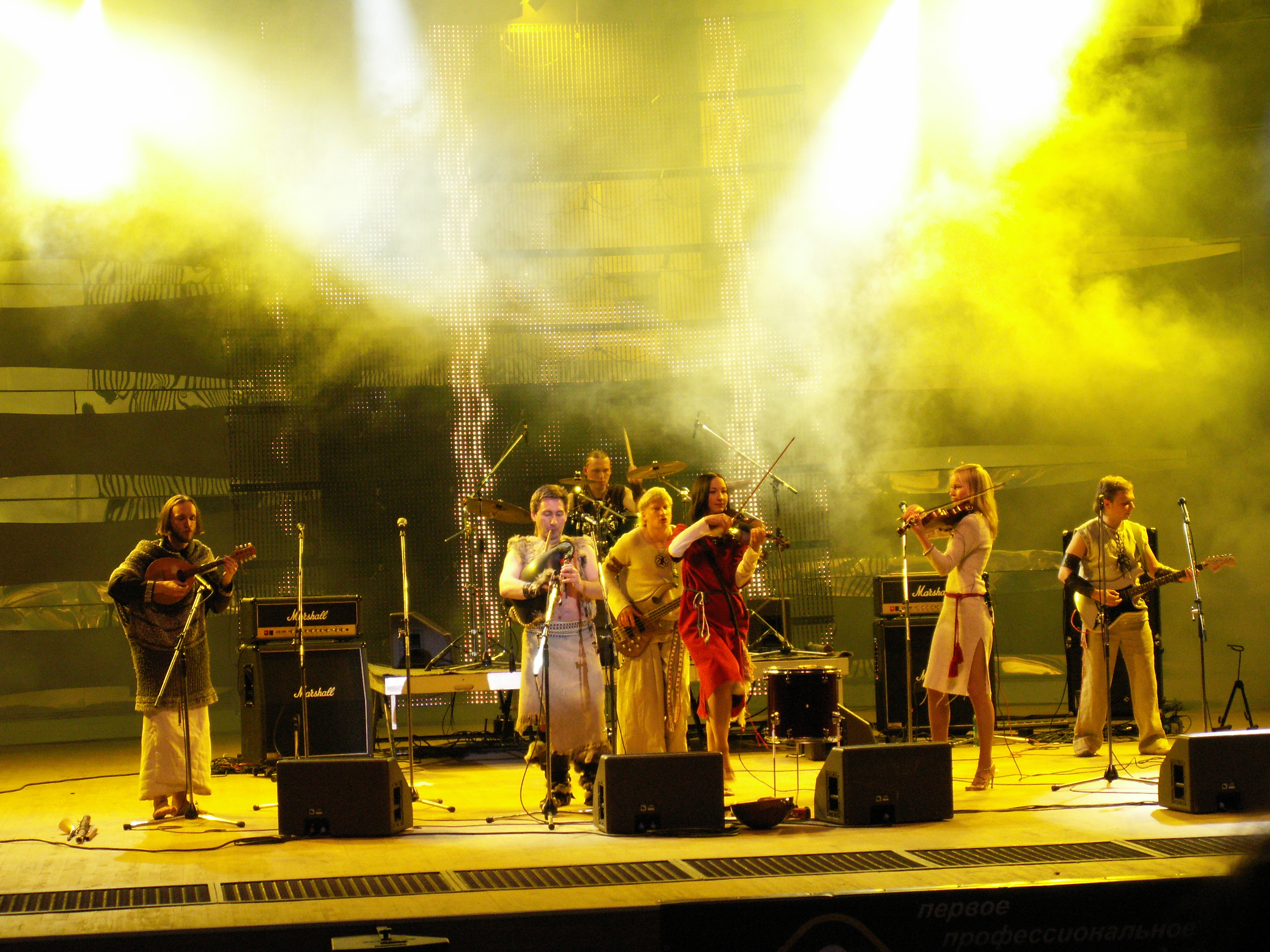
Osimira at the World Music Tree 2008 festival in Vitebsk

== Festivals ==
- be2gether
- Be2gether festival
- FIDOF
- Koktebel Jazz Festival
- Slavianski Bazaar in Vitebsk
- Viljandi Folk Festival

== Official download ==
- OSIMIRA "DRUVA" (2007, RAR-archive) ]
- OSIMIRA "PROSHCHA" (2006, RAR-archive)
