= Shoot the Runner =

2006 single by Kasabian

Single by Kasabian

from the album Empire
- B-side: "Pictures of Matchstick Men"
- Released: 6 November 2006
- Genre: Glam rock
- Length: 3:27
- Label: RCA
- Songwriter: Sergio Pizzorno
- Producers: Jim Abbiss, Kasabian

Kasabian singles chronology
"Empire" (2006)	"Shoot the Runner" (2006)	"Me Plus One" (2007)

"Shoot the Runner" is a song by English rock band Kasabian and is the second track on their second album, Empire. It was released on 6 November 2006 as the second single from that album in the United Kingdom, peaking at No. 17 in the UK Singles Chart.

== Composition ==
The song is in 4/4 swing time and is the band's first song to feature both Tom Meighan and Sergio Pizzorno on lead vocals. Meighan sings the chorus, starting with the lines 'Shoot the runner, shoot shoot the runner/I'm a king and she's my queen' while Pizzorno sings the other parts (starting with the line 'Dream, dream again in your way/Always knew that you would'). However, in some acoustic performances, the two vocalists swap parts.

It is also the band's first single to feature profanity, and therefore 'bitch' was censored on radio edits.

== Use in media ==
"Shoot The Runner" was released as downloadable content on Guitar Hero III: Legends of Rock with the 3-song pack and for the Rock Band series on September 23, 2008. This song is also included in the Saints Row 2 soundtrack. It is also featured in the Sports spoof movie The Comebacks. It is prominently heard in the Gameloft crime video game Gangstar Vegas, where it is one of the songs in the fictional radio station The Knife 87.8. It is also featured in CSI: Crime Scene Investigation. The song is also played in the build up to Leicester City home matches at King Power Stadium, owing to the band's connection to the City and Football Club.

== Music video ==
The music video was directed by Alex & Martin (best known for their work on the video for The White Stripes' "Seven Nation Army"), and is similar in style to the music video for Queens of the Stone Age's "Go with the Flow" except more colourful; it features animation made by rotoscoping the band members.

== Personnel ==
Kasabian

- Tom Meighan – vocals
- Sergio Pizzorno – vocals, guitar, synths
- Chris Edwards – bass
- Ian Matthews – drums

Additional musicians

- Nick Attwood – trombone
- Craig Crofton – saxophone

== Track listings ==
- 2-track CD PARADISE43 / 886970215725
1. "Shoot the Runner" – 3:27
2. "Pictures of Matchstick Men" (Status Quo cover) - 4:06
- 10" PARADISE45 / 886970215619
1. "Shoot the Runner" – 3:27
2. "Shoot the Runner" (Shakes Remix)
- DVD PARADISE46 / 886970215725
1. "Shoot the Runner" – 3:27
2. "Stay Away from the Brown Acid (Part 1)"
3. Audio of Live 4Music Presents
4. "Shoot the Runner" (video)
5. "Shoot the Runner" (video offline excerpt)

== Certifications ==
Region	Certification	Certified units/sales
United Kingdom (BPI)	Gold	400,000^{‡}
^{‡} Sales+streaming figures based on certification alone.
