= Empire (Kasabian song) =

2006 single by Kasabian

- CD cover

Single by Kasabian

from the album Empire
- B-side: "Black Whistler"; "Ketang"
- Released: 24 July 2006
- Length: 3:53 (album version); 3:24 (single version)
- Label: Columbia
- Songwriters: Sergio Pizzorno; Chris Karloff
- Producers: Jim Abbiss; Kasabian

Kasabian singles chronology
"Club Foot" (reissue) (2005)	"Empire" (2006)	"Shoot the Runner" (2006)

Alternative cover
- DVD and 10-inch cover

"Empire" is a song by English rock band Kasabian, included as the title track for their second studio album, Empire (2006). It was released 24 July 2006 as the lead single from that album. The single became popular immediately, entering the UK Singles Chart at number nine, its peak position, making it the band's third UK top-10 single.

The song was available as a pre-order on the band's website which also included a free download of their cover of David Bowie's "Heroes", which was used for ITV's coverage of the 2006 FIFA World Cup. It was also used during series 9 of Top Gear.

== Background ==
Guitarist Sergio Pizzorno said,

'Empire' is about disobeying orders; it's about the middle finger to the machine. We are in a rock 'n' roll band; we are outlaws - we are bandits and we are pirates. We earn a living from being musicians - now that to me is amazing and now 'Empire' - we used this as a metaphor in war to disobey the generals when the order was given and the lads said: 'You know what? 'Fuck 'em, I'm not doing what you say anymore'

== Composition ==
"Empire" is one of Kasabian's first songs to include a live string section, which would be a prominent element of their albums from this point forward. It also features backing vocals from Joana Glaza, the then-lead singer of Joana and the Wolf.

The beginning of the album title track for Empire has a recording that was left on one of the band members mobile phone answering service. Currently the person is unknown but Jo Whiley discussed having been provided with this information by the band in an answers section she did on Radio 1 around 11 or 12 July 2007. It appears the person mis-dialed accidentally calling the band member and leaving a very strange message; so strange and incoherent that the band felt it should be included in the track. The message goes something like "This is the coach on at... at... Clayton Avenue. I just wanna log on when you talk to me, OK?"

== Music video ==
The music video for "Empire" was directed by W.I.Z. with casting by Sorin Tarau, and featured on the DVD single. It portrays the members of Kasabian as troopers of the 11th Hussars Regiment (of the famed Charge of the Light Brigade) during the Crimean War. The video was shot on location outside Bucharest.

The video features the general sitting at the table with a bottle of John Courage beer.

Matching the strong anti-war message of the song, the "Empire" video presents a look of fiery death and destruction caused by the war. The video opens with a boy messenger delivering a message to the band, stationed on the frontlines (a reference to the band's second single "Shoot the Runner"). The boy is shot by an unseen attacker and killed. The band decides to remove itself from the front line and head back to the generals' station while passing their regiment which is disembarking for an attack. After the firing squad refuses to shoot the last survivor of the band (Tom), the commanding officer steps in and shoots him for refusing to enter the battlefield. The video closes with a sardonic use of the Latin phrase, Dulce et decorum est pro patria mori (roughly translated into English as, "It is sweet and fitting to die for one's country."), well known as part of the famous anti-war poem written by First World War soldier Wilfred Owen. It also bears some similarity to the famous novels and TV series; Sharpe.

Guitarist Sergio Pizzorno said the video concept was based on the movies Shaft and Butch Cassidy and the Sundance Kid.

== Track listings ==
UK CD single

1. "Empire" (single edit)
2. "Black Whistler"

UK limited-edition 10-inch single

1. "Empire" (single edit)
2. "Empire" (Jagz Kooner remix)

UK DVD single

1. "Empire"
2. "Ketang"
3. "Empire" (EPK video)

== Personnel ==
Kasabian

- Tom Meighan – lead vocals
- Sergio Pizzorno – guitar, synths, backing vocals, songwriting
- Chris Edwards – bass
- Ian Matthews – drums
- Christopher Karloff – songwriting

Additional musicians

- Joana Glaza – backing vocals
- Farhat Bouallagui – violin, viola
- Bouzid Ezzedine – violin
- Jazzer Haj Youssef – violin

== Charts ==
=== Weekly charts ===
Chart (2006)	Peak position
Ireland (IRMA)	32
Japan (Oricon)	104
Scottish Singles Sales (Official Charts)	7
UK Singles (Official Charts)	9

=== Year-end charts ===
Chart (2006)	Position
UK Singles (OCC)	78

== Certifications ==
Region	Certification	Certified units/sales
United Kingdom (BPI)	Silver	200,000^{‡}
^{‡} Sales+streaming figures based on certification alone.
