= Raudondvaris Castle =

Castle in Lithuania

Coordinates: 54°56′35″N 23°47′00″E

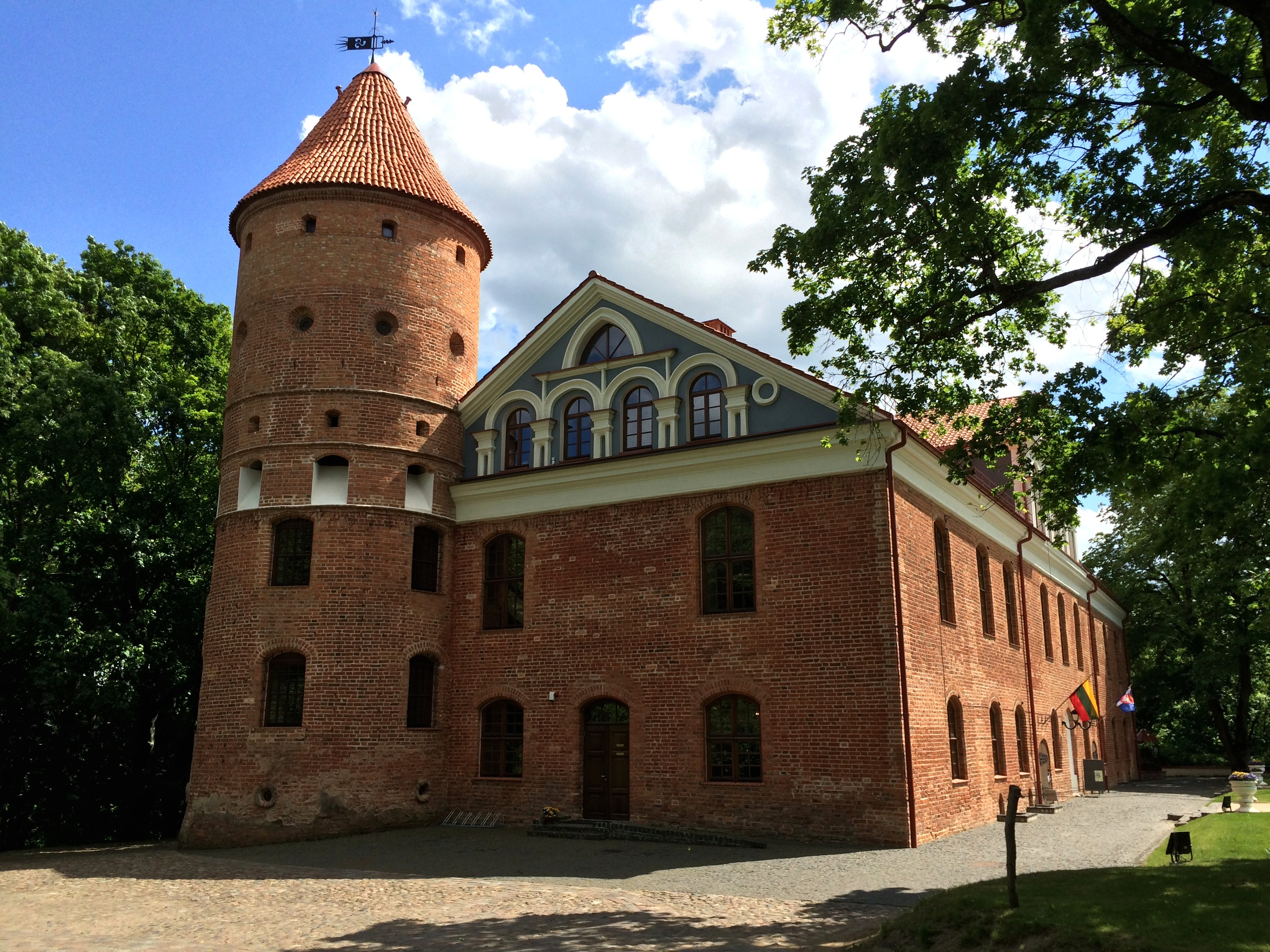
Raudondvaris Castle

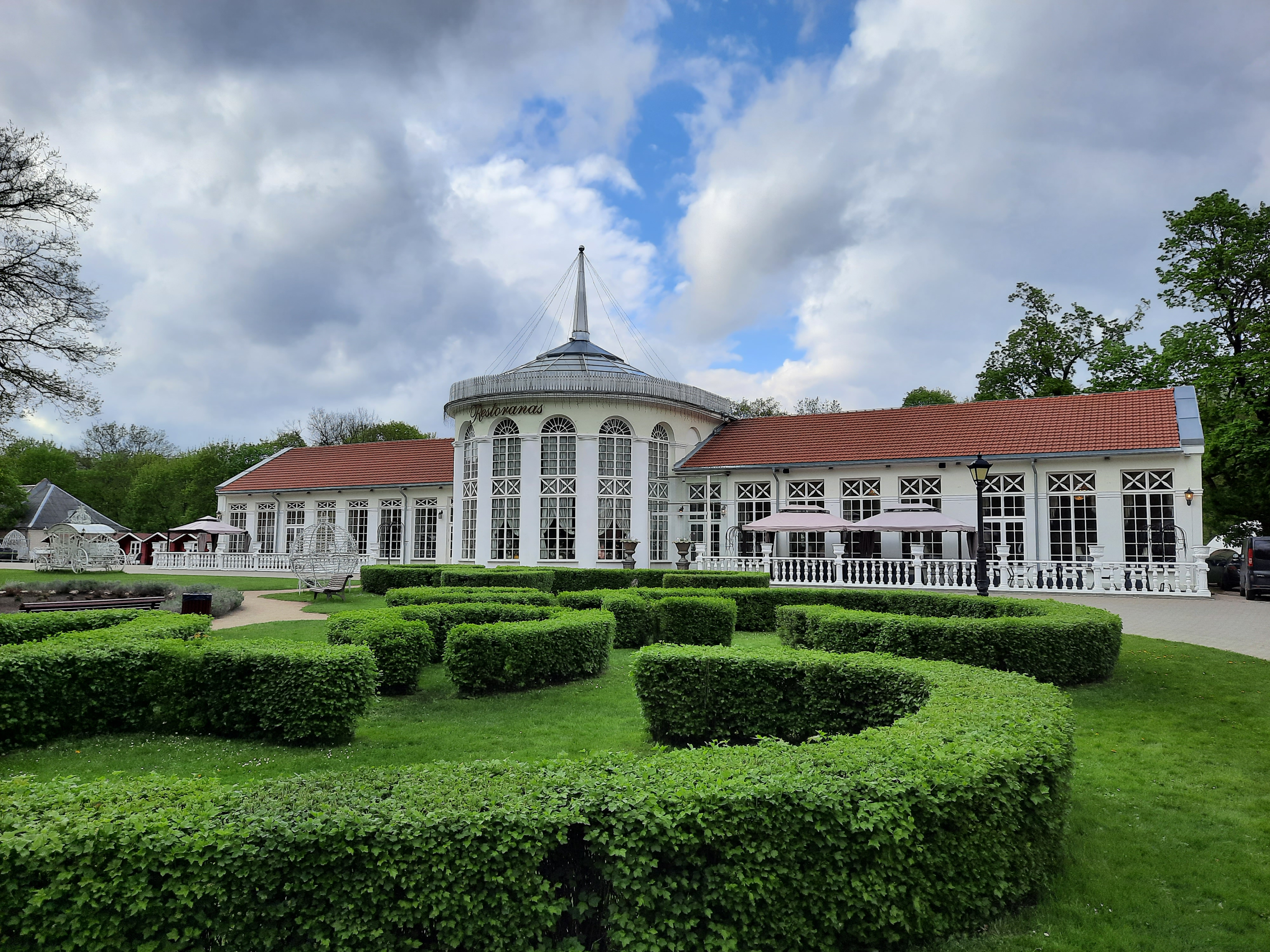
Orangery

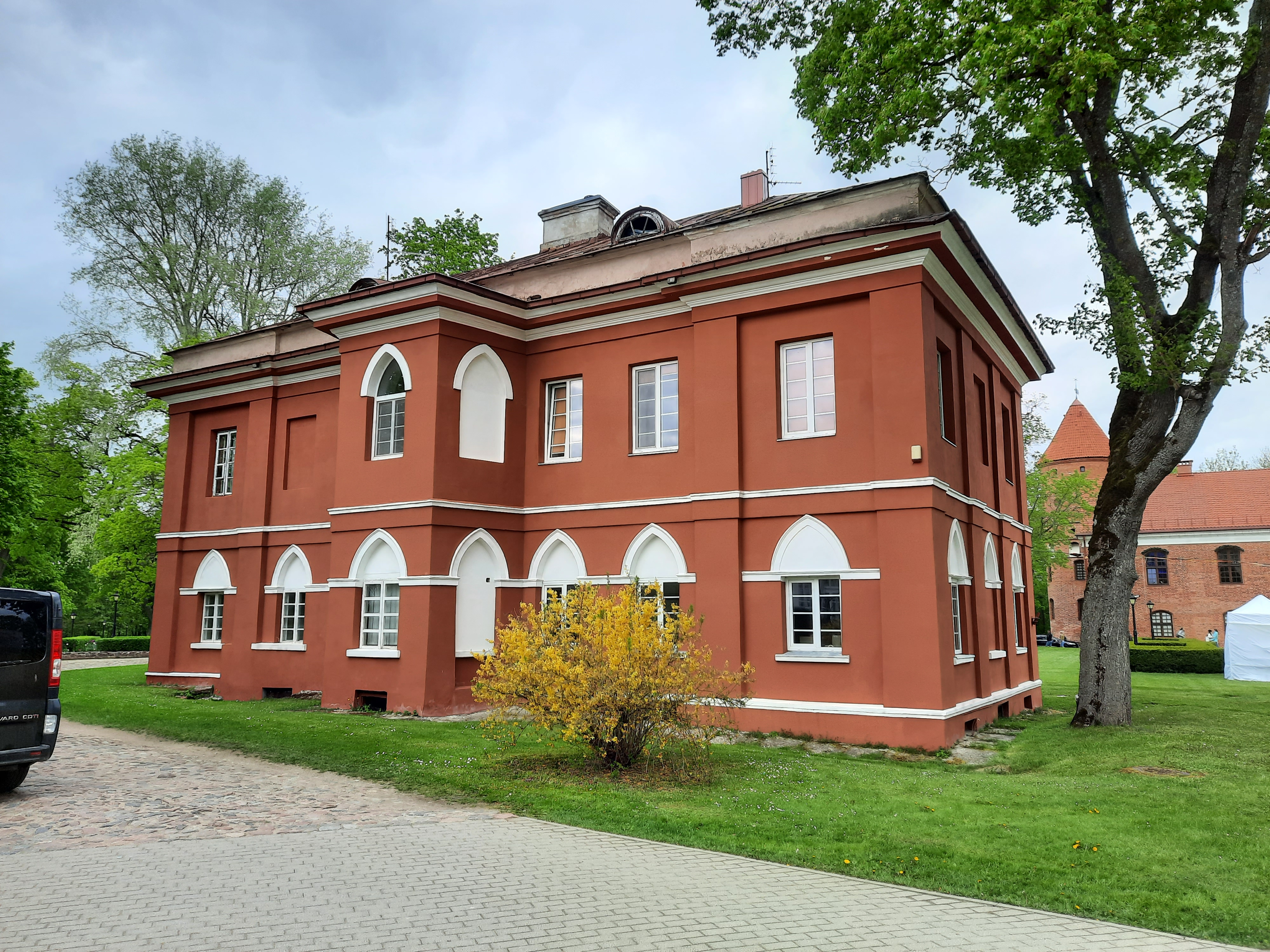
Stables

Raudondvaris Castle (Lithuanian: Raudondvario pilis, Polish: Czerwony Dwór, literally "Red Manor"), also referred to as Raudondvaris Manor, is a Gothic-Renaissance gentry residence, located in the eponymous town of Raudondvaris, Lithuania.

First mentioned as a pagan keep by Teutonic chroniclers in 1392. When Samogitia was handed over to the Order, the Teutons built a small castle of Koenigsburg on this spot, housing 80 knights and 400 soldiers. The castle was further strengthened and enlarged following the Battle of Grunwald. Since then it was the personal property of kings of Poland and the Grand Dukes of Lithuania until 1549, when Sigismund II Augustus donated it (along with the surrounding town) to his wife, queen-consort Barbara Radziwiłł. Following her death the red brick-built manor (which gave its name to the surrounding village of Czerwony Dwór, modern Raudondvaris) fell into disuse and was sold to Gintowt-Dziewałtowski family, who sold it back to the mighty Radziwiłł family soon afterwards.

Between 1653 and 1664 Prince Janusz Radziwiłł ordered its reconstruction and refurbishment, which gave it its current form. Following his demise, the manor passed from one noble family to another, first the Worłowski, then given to Zabiełło family and finally in 1820s it was purchased by Benedykt Tyszkiewicz. After the November Uprising in 1831, the castle was devastated by the Russian army, however, it was rebuilt soon afterwards. The 1832-1855 renovation gave it the Gothic Revival shape, though some traces of earlier Renaissance and Gothic elements are still visible (particularly the round tower that is thought to be part of the original Teutonic stronghold). Around that time the manor was surrounded with a large English-style garden, with a large orangery housing lemon trees. In 1835 a wooden chapel was replaced with a permanent church designed by an Italian expatriate Wawrzyniec Cezary Anichini (who later died in the Red Manor and was buried near the chapel he designed). Between 1856 and 1860 the estate was slightly extended, with many more buildings designed by a German architect by the name of Voler. Those included a new orangery, stables, ice house and offices.

Tyszkiewicz family held the property until World War I. The manor was known to house that family's extensive art collection including works by Leonardo da Vinci, Rubens, Caravaggio and Jan Matejko. After the war the manor was confiscated by Lithuanian authorities. The estate was divided onto individual plots, while the manor itself housed a school and then an orphanage.

The manor was badly damaged during World War II, but was rebuilt between 1962-1975. Currently it houses the Lithuanian Institute of Melioration (Lietuvos žemes úkio inžinierijos institutas), as well as a small museum devoted to both the Tyszkiewicz family and Lithuanian composer Juozas Naujalis born in the nearby village.

== See also ==
- List of castles in Lithuania
