= Norviliškės =

- Village
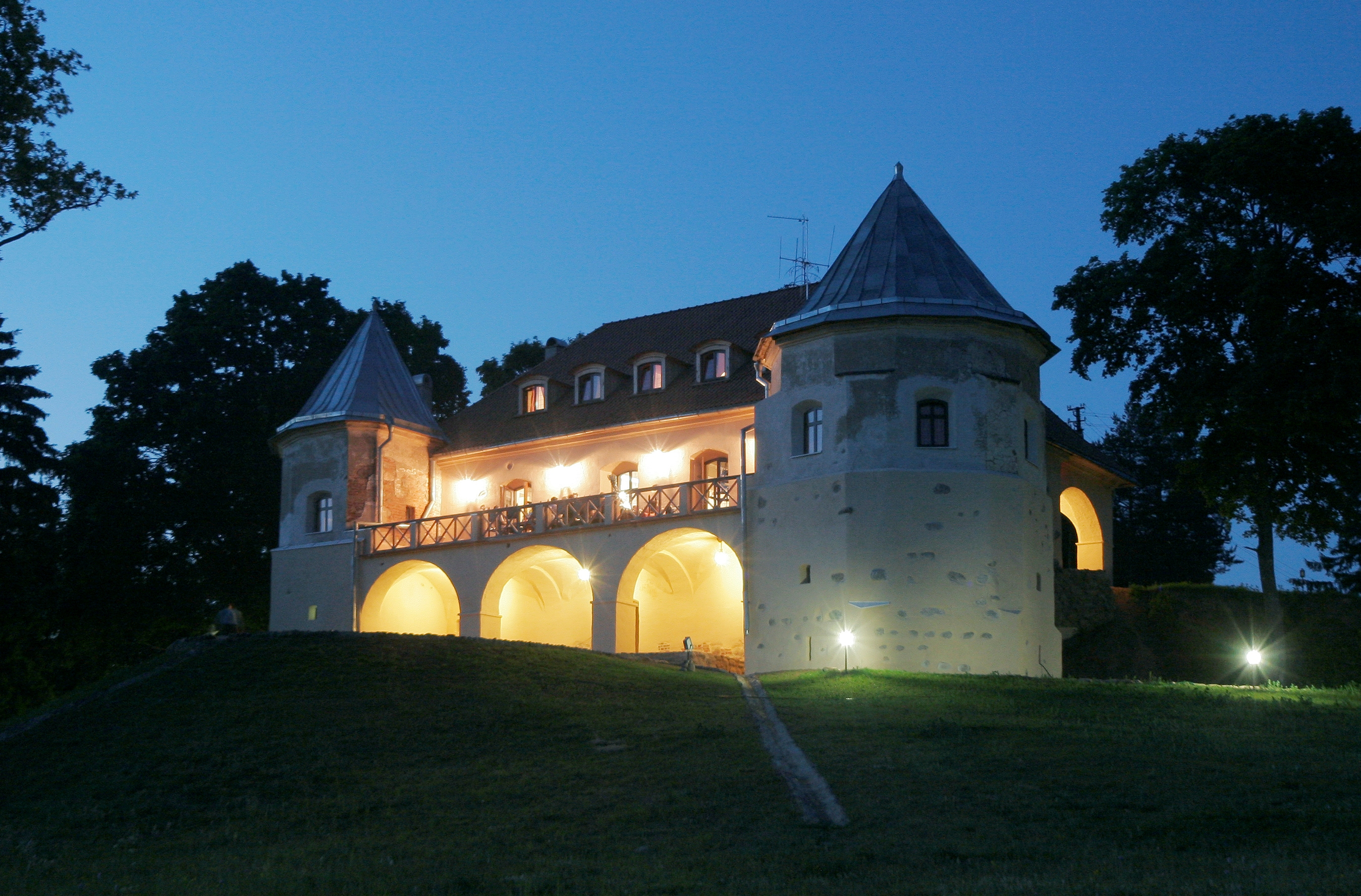
- Norviliškės Castle

- Location of Norviliškės
- Coordinates: 54°14′11″N 25°45′36″E
- Country: Lithuania
- County: Vilnius County
- Municipality: Šalčininkai district municipality
- Eldership: Dieveniškės eldership

Population (2021)
  - Total: 9
- Time zone: UTC+2 (EET)
  - Summer (DST): UTC+3 (EEST)

Norviliškės (Polish: Narwiliszki, Belarusian: Норвілішкес or Нарвілішкі) is a small village in the so-called Dieveniškės appendix, Šalčininkai district municipality, Lithuania. It is located about 12 km (7.5 mi) northeast of the town of Dieveniškės near the border with Belarus. In 1986 it had 58 residents, and 20 residents in 2011. The Norviliškės Manor is first mentioned in 1586. In 1617 the owners ceded part of the land to the Franciscans monks. Around 1745 the Franciscans built a monastery and a church in Renaissance style. The monastery was reconstructed at the end of the 18th century by Kazimierz Kaminski.

For a long time the castle stood abandoned. In 2005, reconstruction was started by an entrepreneur Giedrius Klimkevičius from Vilnius. Since being renovated it is now used to host business conferences or weddings, hunting, shooting practices, and other activities. Since 2007, the music festival Be2gether is held here annually.
