= Tummel =

Swedish/Danish klezmer band

Tummel on the cover of their debut album, Oy!

Tummel is a Swedish/Danish klezmer band formed in 1997. Tummel plays music that combines traditional klezmer sounds with influences from jazz and the folk music of Sweden and the former Yugoslavia.

== Albums ==
Tummel has released three albums: their debut Oy! (see image) appeared in 2001, Transit came out in 2004, and Payback Time in 2009.

As the cover of Oy! shows, Tummel combines a range of jazz instruments including flute and tuba.

== Lineup ==
The band's lineup has changed several times. It started out as Annika Jessen on clarinet and vocals, Jonathan Aisen drums and percussion, Pär Moberg on saxophone, Øvind Alexander Slaatto on helicon, Tobias Allvin on guitar and bouzouki, Andreas Rudenå, violin and guitar and Edin Bahtijaragić on accordion.

== Reception ==
Chris Nickson, writing on CD Universe, praises Tummel's lively performance: "A Danish/Swedish band with no deep Jewish roots playing klezmer? Well, why not, especially when it's done as well as Tummel does on Klezmer."

Robert M Tilendis, writing in Green Man Review, is impressed by Tummel:

"Think about the band playing on while the Titanic goes down. Think of some of Joel Gray's bitchier numbers in Cabaret. Think of Josephine Baker at her most outrageous taking Paris by storm. Think of a bunch of crazy Swedes with no inhibitions whatsoever getting together and letting everyone have it, right between the eyes. That might give an inkling of the tone of Tummel's Payback Time."

Tilendis continues

"It's somewhere between tango and klezmer, but it could be straight out of some Paris bistro ca. 1927, and it's no holds barred."

Tilendis in particular praises vocalist Jens Friis-Hansen:

"he reveals himself as a very talented and versatile singer".

Eelco Schilder, reviewing Tummel's Oy on Folkworld CD Reviews, writes:

"Oy is a fresh, strong cd and highly recommended to everybody who likes Klezmer music."

Ben Ohmart, writing in The Muse's Muse, comments playfully that

"The squeak of the bed (or outside swing), the dog calls, the regal fun that breezes through like a big-nosed circus on its way to a bath is just a delight from morn to night."

Alexander Agrell, reviewing Payback Time (in Swedish) in the Sydsvenskan newspaper, notes that the lineup has changed (Annika Jessen the clarinetist has left), but awards the album a "Plus for humour, cool English lyrics and the originality of the whole thing". He hears influences from rock music, punk, heavy metal, cabaret and even Tom Waits in the album.

A staff reporter from Skanskan.se described (in Swedish) the experience of arriving at a Tummel gig: "The desire to dance and clap in time arises immediately. Your thoughts turn to blazing camp fires and swirling skirts."
