= Joana and the Wolf =

UK musical group (2005–2011)

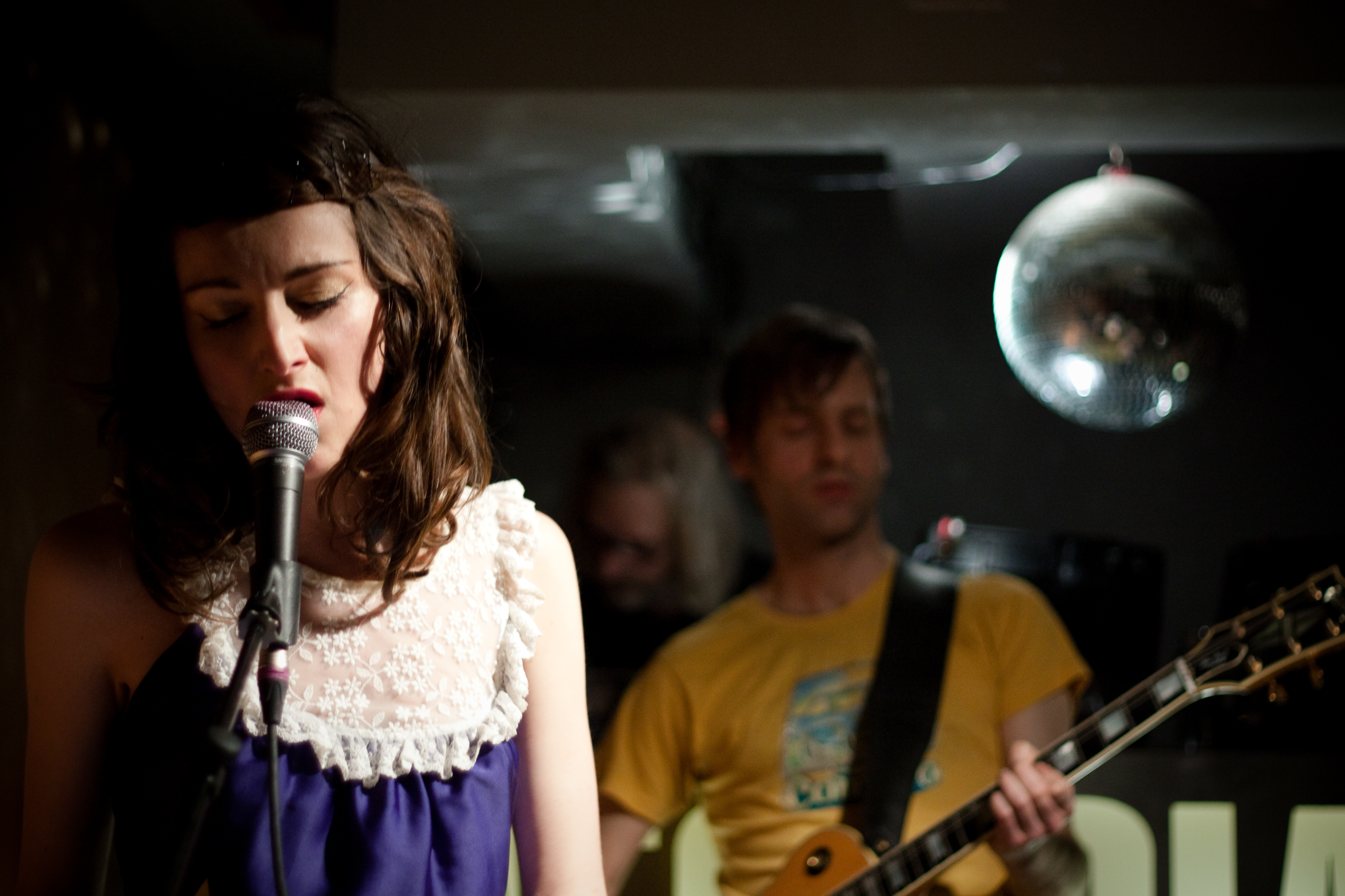
- Glaza and Ali performing at The Social in April 2010

Background information
- Origin: London, England
- Genres: New wave rock
- Years active: 2005–2011
- Members: Joana Glaza (singer, songwriter); Ali (guitar); Katie (bass); Louis (drums)
- Website: joanaandthewolf.com

Joana and the Wolf were a London-based alternative new wave rock band, formed in 2005. Musical influences included Patti Smith, PJ Harvey, The Stooges, and Björk.

== Formation and members ==
The band was made up of lead singer and songwriter Joana Glaza (Joana Mikalauskaitė, who has a degree from the University of Vilnius), guitarist Ali, bassist Katie and drummer Louis. Joana is originally from Lithuania, and has always sung in English since she was a child; the rest of the band are English.

The band formed in summer 2005 after Joana and Ali met through an advert on Loot. Ali originally suggested the name "Joana and the Bitches" as a joke, and Joana changed it to "Wolf" partly due to the use of the wolf in Lithuanian symbolism. The band found new management in 2010, and changed their sound, taking influences from Eastern European folk and classical music.

About their influences, Joana says that "I totally like [Kate Bush] but it’s Wikipedia bullshit again that I’m really influenced by her." She says that PJ Harvey became an influence after people began comparing them: "The last real female influence for me is PJ Harvey – I have almost all her records. But only because when we released our first single 'Purple Nights' everyone was comparing me, and our sound to her. I knew a bit about her at the time but I was intrigued and I wanted to get deeper to try to understand the basis of the comparison."

== Performances ==
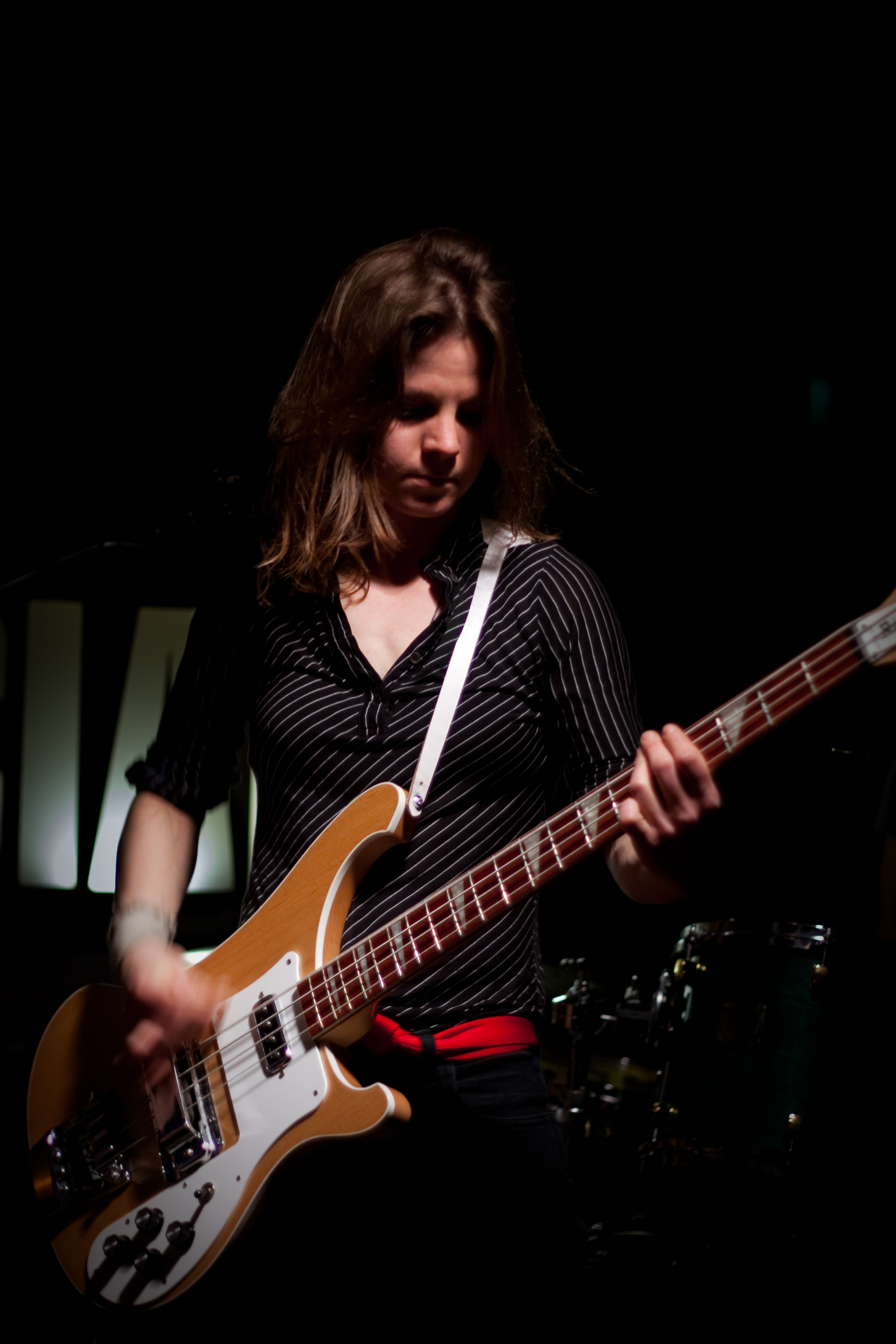
Katie on bass

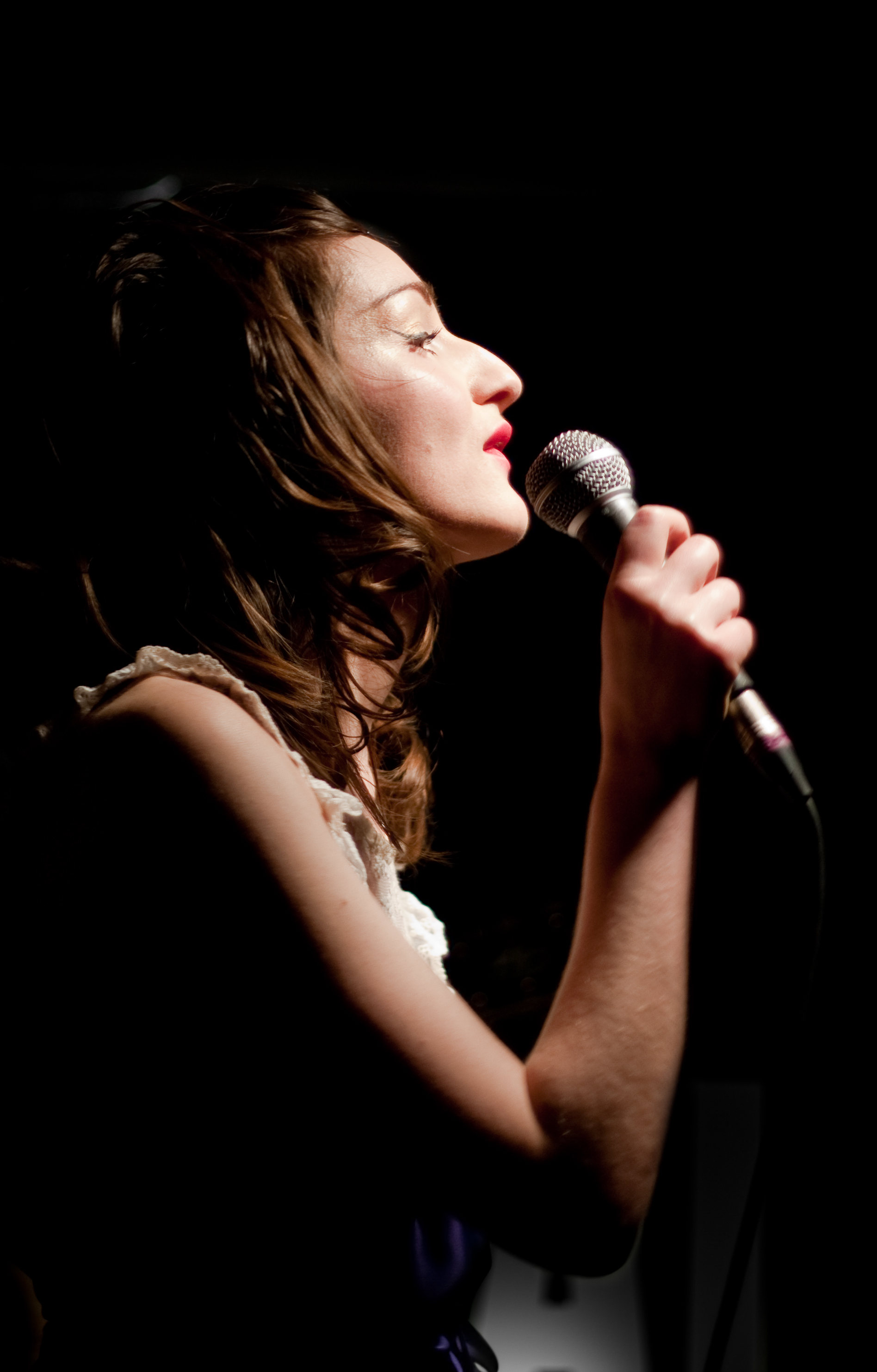
Glaza singing

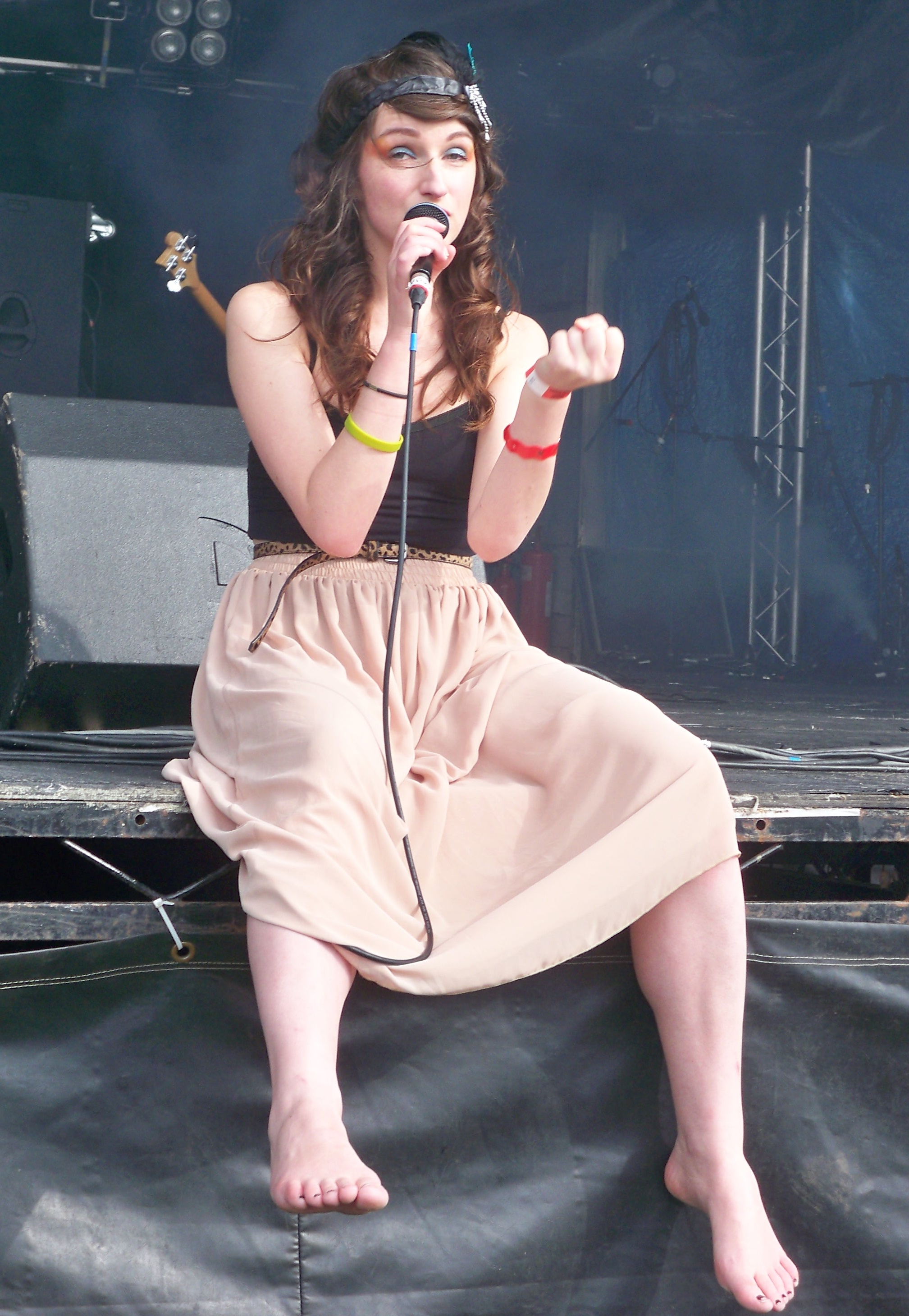
Glaza performing at Guilfest in July 2011

They began performing in public in September 2005, playing their first gig at a venue called The Betsey Trotwood in Farringdon, London. Since then, they have played at many well-known London venues, including The Spitz, Barfly, 100 Club, Purple Turtle, Luminaire, The Enterprise, Water Rats, Hoxton Bar & Kitchen, Proud Gallery, Metro, Ghetto, Favela Chic, Rhythm Factory (supporting Babyshambles), the Dublin Castle, and Koko. Joana prefers playing in East London, particularly at Favela Chic. She says that after the fire at Camden Market, Camden is a "tourist haunt".

The group toured in July / August 2006 to promote their single "Purple Nights", playing venues in Nottingham, Middlesbrough, Hull and London, as well as supporting James Dean Bradfield at his solo gig at ULU on 11 July 2006. The tour culminated in an appearance at Bestival on the Isle of Wight in September 2006. Joana and the Wolf also played in Brighton in summer 2006 as part of The Great Escape Festival, supporting The Bees. Following the gig, they were offered a live session on John Kennedy's Xfm show, which was recorded and broadcast later in 2006.

Joana took her bandmates to her home country for the first time on 25 August 2007 for Be2Gether, a new music festival in South Eastern Lithuania. They played alongside Therapy?, The Young Knives and the Bloodhound Gang. In 2009, they played The Big Chill festival and performed twice at London's Lovebox Festival in July 2010.

== Releases ==
Following a gig at Water Rats in King's Cross, members of Kasabian who were in attendance invited Joana to record a guest vocal on their single (and title track of their second album), "Empire".

The band released a single, "Purple Nights", on 14 August 2006. It was produced by Jim Abbiss, who had previously worked with Arctic Monkeys and Editors. With the track "November", it was released on 7" vinyl and iTunes by Regal Records (an offshoot of Parlophone), the first release of the Regal Singles Club.

In summer 2009, "Natural Born Killers" was released on iTunes, backed with "Demon's Bride".

"Hide Me" was released as a download-only single on 3 May 2011, backed with "Vagabond Song", available on iTunes and Amazon.

== Songs ==
The band's repertoire includes: Hide Me; Vagabond Song; Demon's Bride; Isabella; Sleepwalker; Big Black Bird; Dead or Alive; Do Ya?; Entertainer; Frankie; Greedy Thoughts; Kingdom; Kitty; London Baby; Mia; November; Pablo; Patience; Purple Nights; She Will Die; Tiger; Vicious Circles; Wild Dogs; Witch Hunt

== Reception ==
In 2006, the band won a vote on Steve Lamaqc's 6 Music Rebel Playlist. On 15 May 2007, the band received an award at the inaugural Indy Music Awards, which was created to support and recognise independent bands and venues in London. They won in their category of "Best New Wave/Progressive Act" and followed the win with a performance of their song "Pablo". They were also nominated in 2008.

Joana has received media attention in Lithuania, including appearing in Lithuanian Cosmopolitan magazine. The band's music was also played on Lithuanian national radio leading up to their appearance at a festival in 2007.

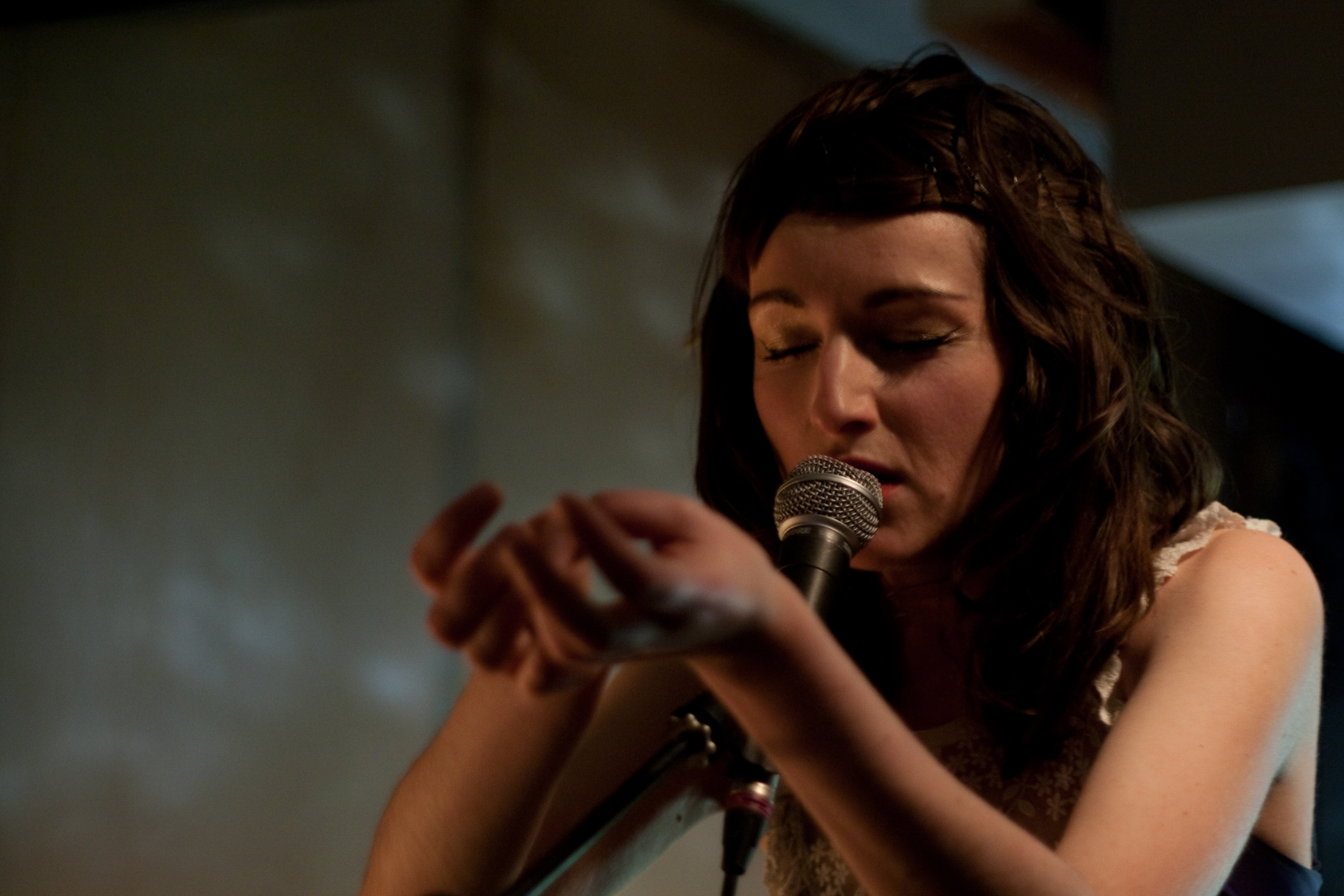
Glaza making a "dramatic hand gesture."

TourDates commented that "all that talk of wolf encountering and subsequent swallowing whilst out wandering through some woods, makes ridiculous sense when you hear how this woman can quite literally howl." NoiseMatters called them "[l]ike Siouxsie Sioux but without the overly-made up falseness and a better vocal range, a bit like Bjork but sane, and a bit like Shakespeare's Sister, with a liberal splash of Kate Bush. Quite a mix, but a unique sound... Joana Glaza's vocal range is impressive, however she shares with the Icelandic singer a fetish for vocal affectations which are both distinctive and, at times, piercing." Metro commented that they "played a storming set of thrilling new wave rock" calling Joana "mesmeric" and "defiantly doing her own thing. On the strength of this set, proper New Favourite Band material." Time Out said the "howling, grunge-pop blues and dramatic hand gestures are somewhat bewildering." Forge Music called "Natural Born Killers" "a slow-burning, unpretentious and angsty reminder of what memorable, simplistic rock 'n' roll should be." Is This Music? said of that single that she has "haunting and endearing vocals." Music Week, reviewing "Purple Nights", said that "here is an exciting band with a singer very much in touch with her inner PJ Harvey and with enough of an ear for melody to leave people wanting more." NME said of a performance at The Social in 2010 that "her incredible siren's song coaxes the crowd with each careful quivering octave." The Fly said that "their live shows are essential viewing... Weird indeed but also rather wonderful..."

== Break-up ==
The band broke up in late 2011 after over six years of performing and recording together.
