= Raudondvaris =

- Town
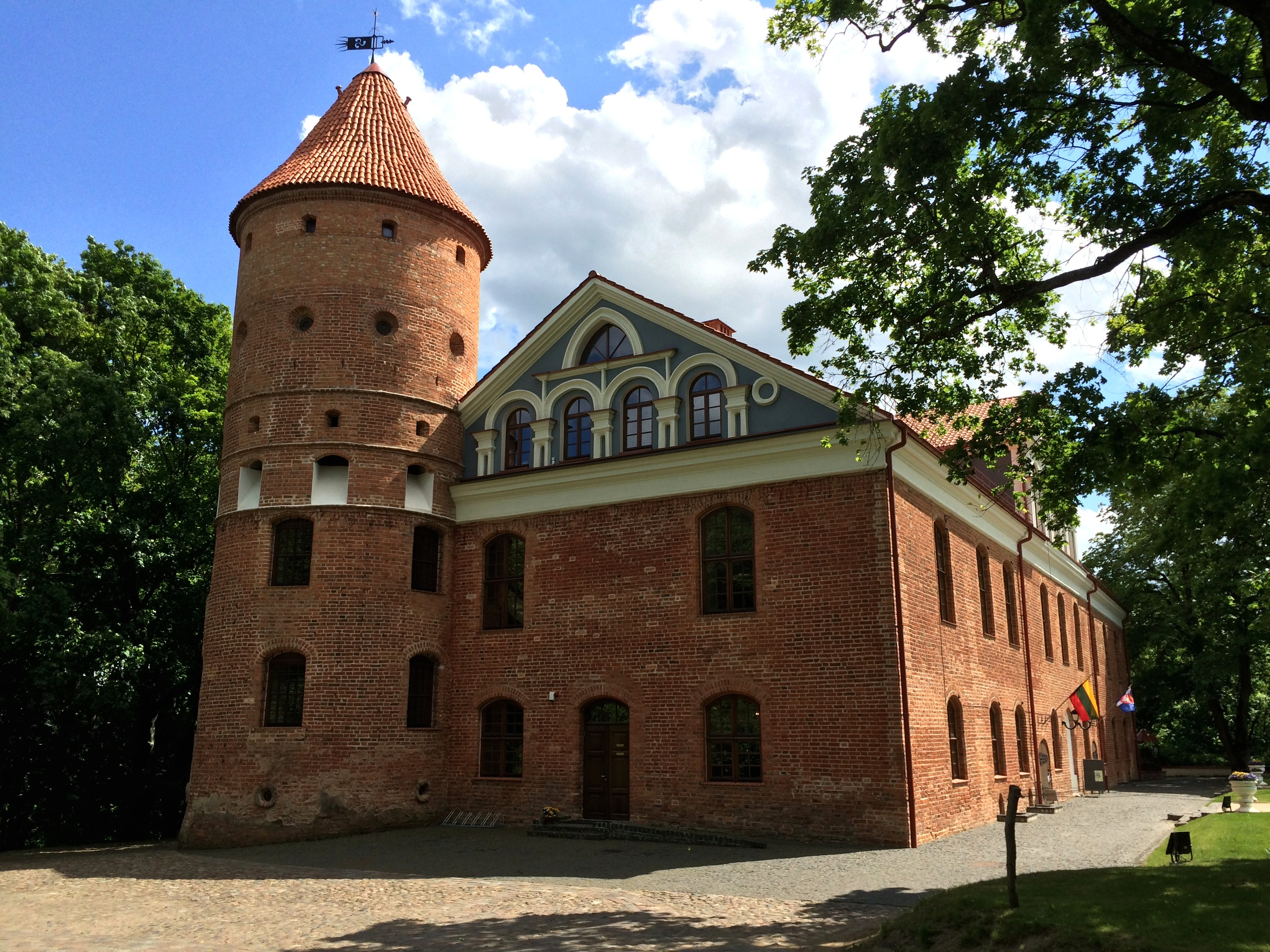
- Raudondvaris Castle

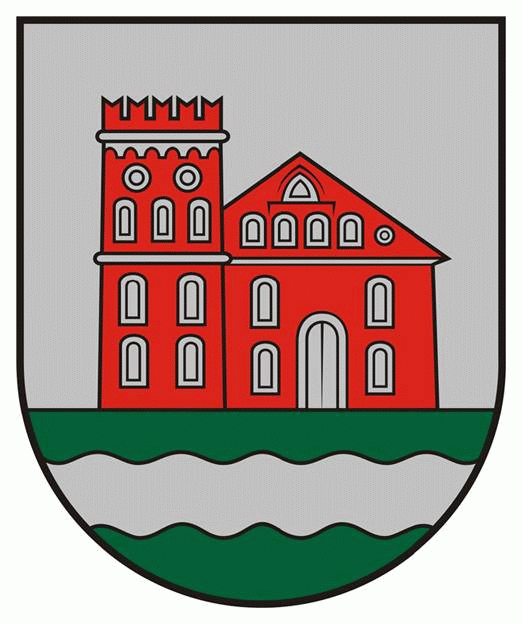
- Coat of arms

- Location of Radondvaris
- Coordinates: 54°56′35″N 23°47′0″E
- Country: Lithuania
- Ethnographic region: Aukštaitija
- County: Kaunas County
- Municipality: Kaunas district municipality
- Eldership: Raudondvaris eldership
- Capital of: Raudondvaris eldership
- First mentioned: 1392

Population (2021)
  - Total: 4,079
- Time zone: UTC+2 (EET)
  - Summer (DST): UTC+3 (EEST)

Raudondvaris is a town on the Nevėžis River in Kaunas district, Lithuania, 1 km (0.62 mi) west of Kaunas city municipality.

== History ==
The town was first mentioned in Teutonic chronicles in 1392. The old castle was rebuilt after the Battle of Grunwald and became Grand Duke's property. In 1549 Grand Duke Sigismund II Augustus presented the castle to his wife, Barbara Radziwiłł. After her death the castle fell to ruin. A new Renaissance red brick palace, known as Raudondvaris Castle, was built in 1615 on the high bank of the Nevėžis River by the Radziwiłłs. The palace is surrounded by a park with a palm house (no longer in use). The residence was known for its remarkable fine arts collection, including paintings by Leonardo da Vinci, Caravaggio, Rubens and del Sarto. The palace belonged to the Tyszkiewicz family until the end of World War I, when it was converted into a shelter for children. It suffered damage during World War II and was rebuilt only in 1959–1973. Currently it houses collections devoted to the Tyszkiewicz family and Juozas Naujalis.

Another notable building in Raudondvaris is the basilica of St. Theresa, founded by Benedykt Tyszkiewicz (rebuilt in the 20th century), with altars painted by Michał Elwiro Andriolli, and Tyszkiewicz family tombstones.

== Famous citizens ==
- Edvinas Dautartas, Olympic swimmer

== Gallery ==
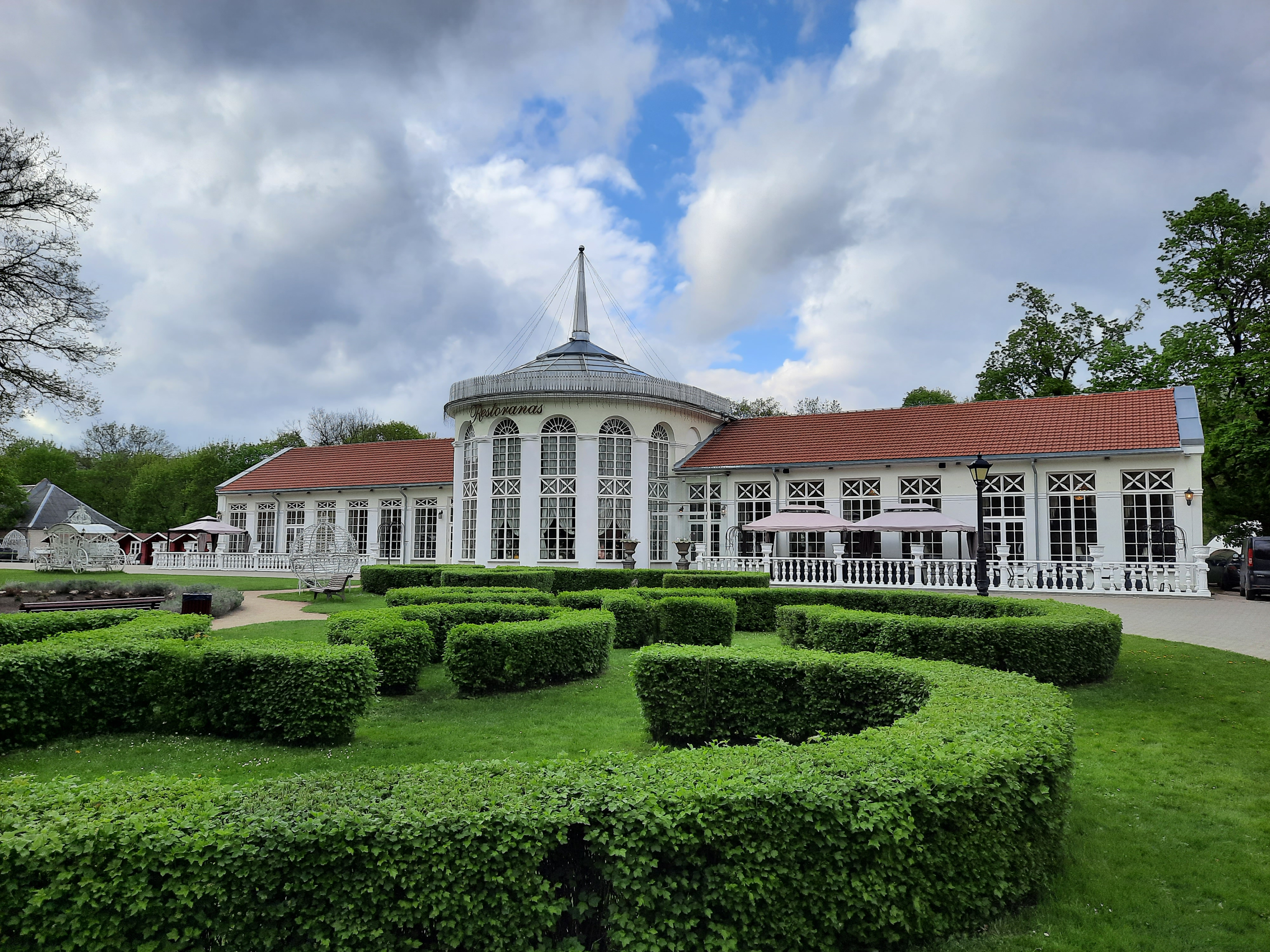
Orangery

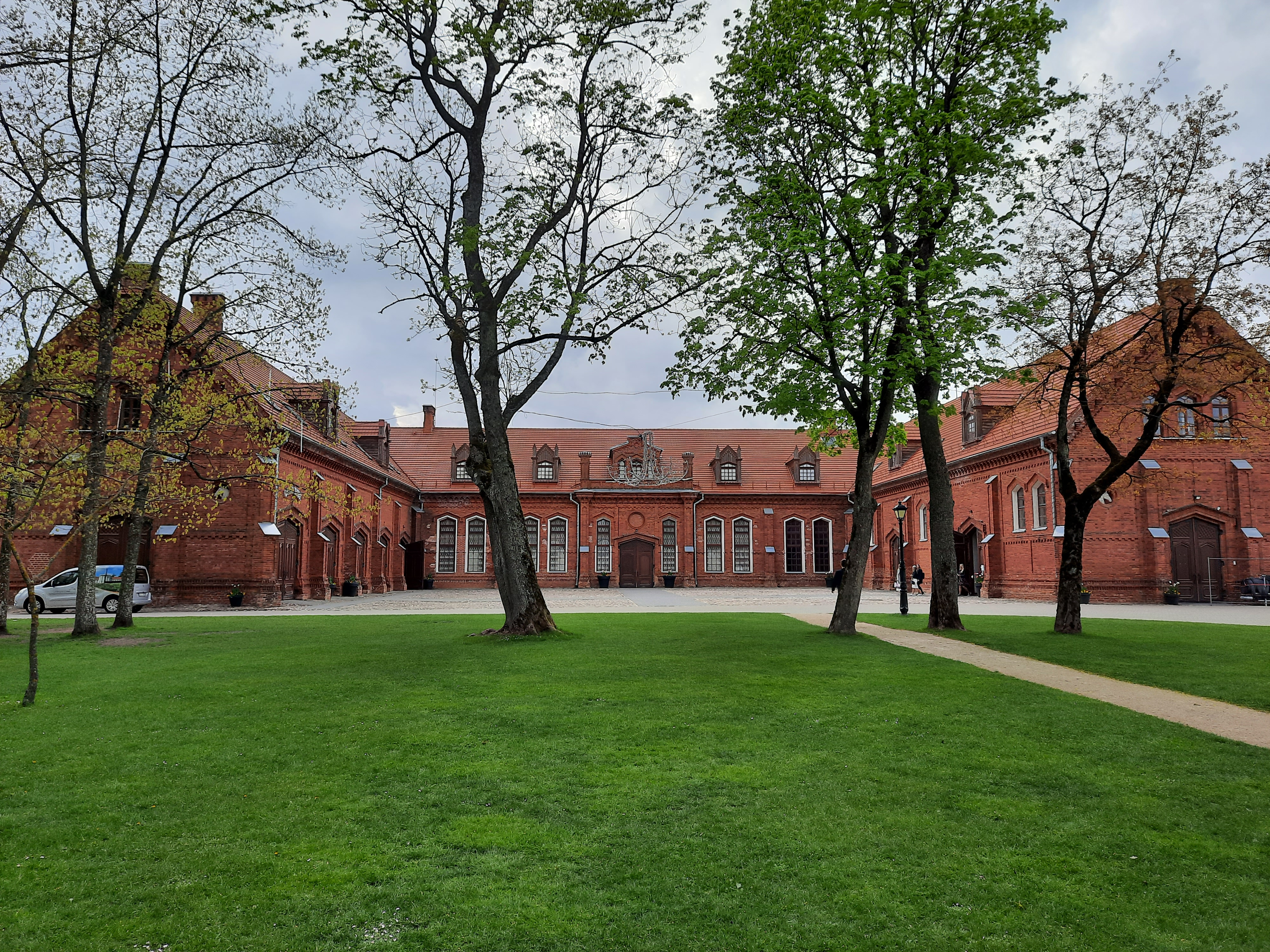
Stables

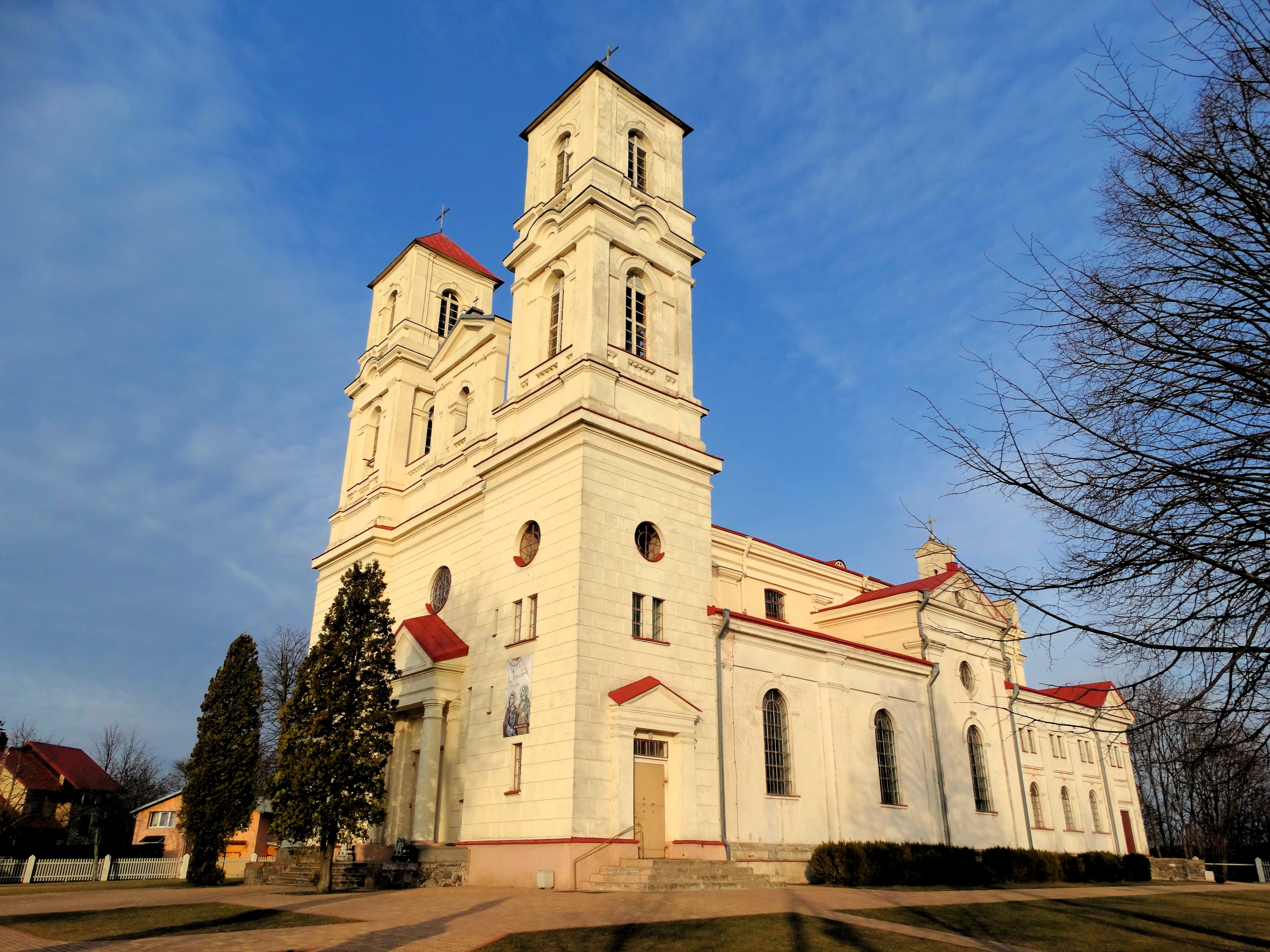
St. Theresa church

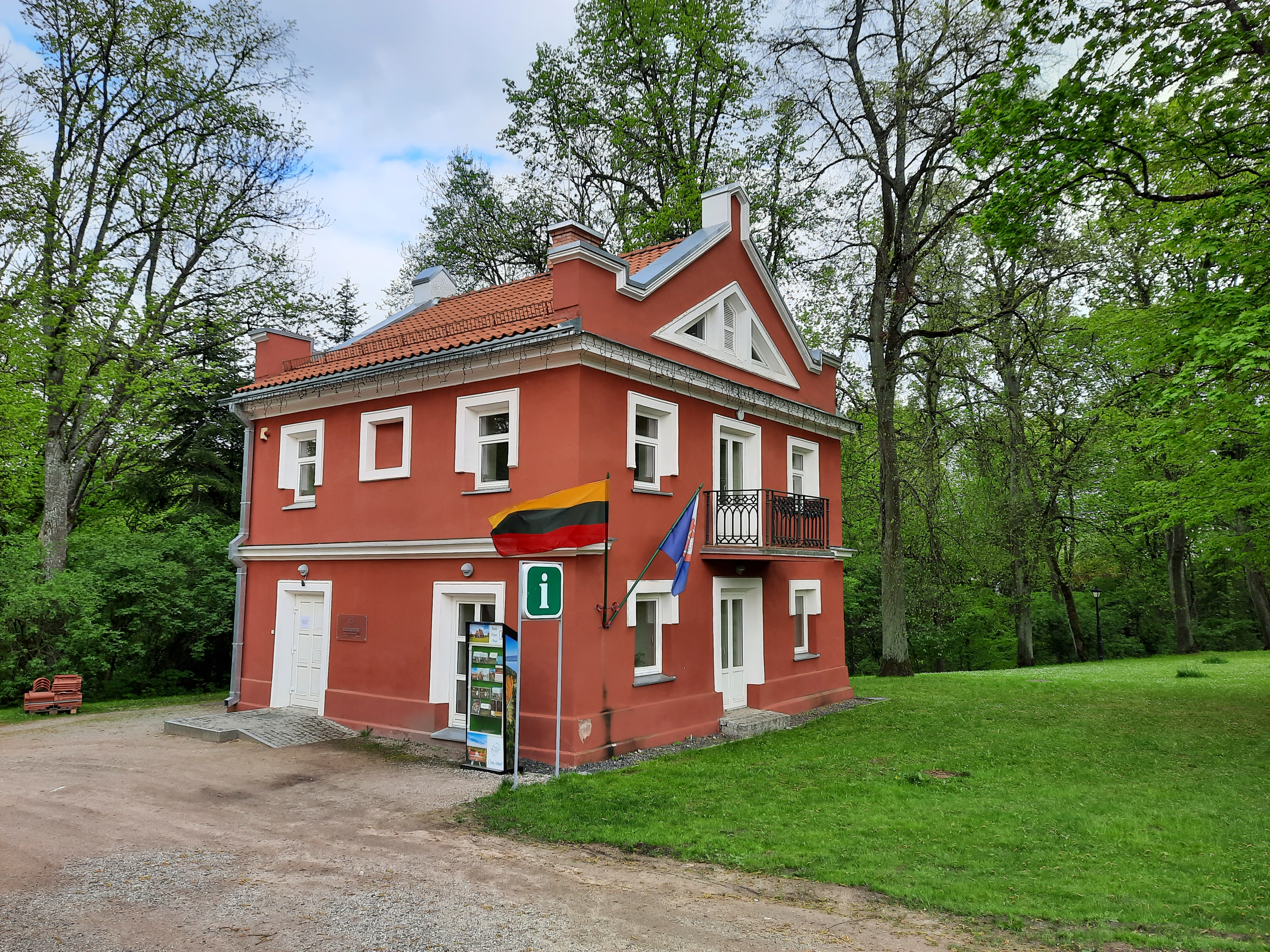
Ice house
