= Alfonsas Svarinskas =

Lithuanian Catholic priest, resistance fighter and politician (1925–2014)

Monsignor Alfonsas Svarinskas

Orders
- Ordination: October 3, 1954 by Bishop Pranciškus Ramanauskas

Personal details
- Born: January 21, 1925 Kadrėnai, Vidiškiai parish, Ukmergė County, Lithuania
- Died: July 17, 2014 (aged 89) Vilnius, Lithuania
- Education: Kaunas Priest Seminary (unfinished due to Soviet persecution)

Alfonsas Svarinskas (January 21, 1925 – July 17, 2014) was a Lithuanian Roman Catholic priest and freedom fighter against the Soviet occupation of Lithuania. He was a Lithuanian partisan, military chaplain and a Lithuanian Army Reserve Colonel. He was honored with the title of Monsignor by Pope John Paul II on November 14, 1990.

Svarinskas was arrested three times by the occupying Soviet authorities, spent more than 20 years in Soviet gulags and was nicknamed "The Incorrigible" (Russian: Неисправимый, romanized: Neispravimyy) by the KGB.

In November 1978, Svarinskas was one of the five founders of the Catholic Committee for the Defense of Believers' Rights. The Committee documented and publicized violations of the rights of Catholics in Lithuania by the occupying Soviet Union, which was an officially atheist state. He was also one of the founders of the Chronicle of the Lithuanian Catholic Church.

After Lithuania regained independence in 1990, he was the only priest to be part of its parliament – the Supreme Council – Reconstituent Seimas – from September 1991 until November 1992 (when the Council dissolved itself).

== Early life ==
Alfonsas Svarinskas was born on January 21, 1925, in the village of Kadrėnai, near Ukmergė, Lithuania. In his autobiography, he wrote that: "My parents were good religious people, they worked long and hard." He came from a farming family and received his early education in nearby schools.

=== Education ===
From 1932 to 1936 he attended a primary school in Vidiškiai. Then, he attended for one year respectively at the schools of Ukmergė (5th grade) and Deltuva (6th grade). Thereafter, he attended the Antanas Smetona Gymnasium in Ukmergė. He noted that the later-famous professor Zigmas Zinkevičius was also there, though he was one grade younger. The first Soviet occupation of Lithuania began in June 1940, which was a major shock to all, including the schoolboys. The Soviet deportations, starting on June 14, 1941, created an atmosphere of terror across Lithuania. The deportations and Soviet terror stopped only when Operation Barbarossa began on June 22, which led to the German occupation of Lithuania during World War II, which lasted from summer 1941 to summer 1944. Svarinskas attended the Ukmergė's Teachers' seminar for one year, but he soon decided to enter the Kaunas Priest Seminary.

== Seminary (1942–1946) ==
In 1942, he entered the Kaunas Priest Seminary at the age of 17 to study for Catholic priesthood. At the seminary, the lectures were held six days a week (from morning to lunch), with a break of a couple of hours after lunch and then independent study until evening. Svarinskas wrote:

These honorable teachers and fathers gave us not only scientific and professional knowledge, but also taught us to love God and our neighbor, to fight evil not only in our own hearts, but also in all of Lithuania. They taught us to love God and our Fatherland more than our youth and life. We understood that politics is challenging when implementing the Decalogue's commandment of love of neighbor.

While still a gymnasium student, he became involved in underground resistance activities opposing the Soviet occupation. He continued his involvement during his seminary studies. After the Soviet occupation started in summer 1944, when Svarinskas returned to his village from the seminary, he would bring the underground press to the villagers and medicine for the Lithuanian partisans.

In 1943, Svarinskas had also joined an orientalist group under Bishop Teofilius Matulionis, which was dedicated to missions to Russia, but it was disbanded after the Gestapo found out about it. Svarinskas ironically noted in his autobiography, that: "As far as I remember, most of the members of that group later ended up in Bolshevik gulags. So they ended up in missions, just in a different way."

== Resistance ==
During the Soviet occupation of Lithuania during 1944–1990, the Catholic Church in Lithuania was leading the struggle for Lithuanian independence. In its resolutions, the Communist Party of Lithuania directly named the Catholic Church as its enemy. The Lithuanian Catholic priests were the moral strength of the Lithuanian partisans, who fought on for ten years, starting in summer 1944. At least 364 priests were deported from Lithuania from 1944 to 1953.

In 1945, Svarinskas refused to answer the mobilisation to the occupying Soviet Red Army. His underground activity involved forging documents, especially to help others avoid military service for the Soviet Union. In spring 1946, the KGB was looking for Svarinskas at the seminary and in his hometown, but he was elsewhere. This meant that it was dangerous for him to return to the seminary. That same year, 20 seminarians were deported to gulags. So, without completing his studies at the seminary, Svarinskas left the seminary to join the Lithuanian partisans, which were also called the Forest Brothers.

=== Lithuanian partisan (May–December 1946) ===
Svarinskas was part of the 5th Battalion, B Group of the Great Fight military district, which operated near his hometown. His military superior was Bronius Jakubonis-Stiklas. Svarinskas had near encounters with the Soviet collaborationist extermination battalions.

During extremely difficult times, Svarinskas would come to Kaunas and stay at the apartment of Marcelė Mačiulytė (sister of Maironis, the most important Lithuanian poet), get a warm bath, and then after resting a day or two, Svarinskas would return to the partisans. The Lithuanian villagers warmly greeted and welcomed the Forest Brothers and when they would ask for water to drink, the villagers would also give them food, despite the economic hardships and devastation of the time.

Towards the end of December 1946, Svarinskas was sent to Kaunas because someone promised ammunition to the partisans and he had a letter with instructions to meet at an agreed apartment near the Church of Vytautas the Great. At the apartment, he was offered several bullets wrapped in a handkerchief, upon which Svarinskas immediately realised that this was a deception and he left without taking the bullets. Soon thereafter he was caught and taken to the KGB Headquarters at 6 Stalin Avenue (now Laisvės alėja, which means Freedom Avenue).

=== Interrogation and torture ===
On December 31, 1946, New Year's Eve, at 6 PM, Soviet security forces arrested Svarinskas. The interrogation began at 8 PM and lasted four hours. When the fireworks began, his interrogators took him to cell 15, and then went out to welcome the New Year – 1947.

During his interrogation, the KGB failed to find out that he was a partisan and instead wrote down that he was a partisan liaison for the underground Vytis military district Šarūnas partisan group. KGB also wrote down that Svarinskas' pseudonym was Laisvūnas, because they saw it on a piece of paper and a pocket calendar that they found while they were searching him. The KGB's case file also wrote that Svarinskas belonged to the Lithuanian Liberty Army and its branch in the Kaunas Priest Seminary, but Svarinskas writes in his autobiography that this was not true and that the KGB also made multiple factual mistakes in its documents about him.

During interrogations, Svarinskas had to be careful not to give any information about other people, so he tried to cover his tracks, give false places and names, just so that he would not betray living people. In the prison where he was held during the interrogation, the food they were given was rotten potatoes, boiled in dirty water, with pieces of straw floating in the so-called "soup". The prisons were overcrowded, the prisoners would not be let to go outside and there was always a lack of air in the cell. When a prisoner was taken out for interrogation, the rest of the prisoners in the cell with Svarinskas would recite the Rosary for the prisoner. The interrogation mostly consisted of physical assault, i.e. beating, where they would take the prisoner out of the cell, beat him up and put them back in the cell. The interrogators included both Russians and local collaborators, including those from Lithuania's Russian and Jewish minorities, and from among the latter Svarinskas especially feared KGB podpolkovnik Daniel Todes (Danielius Todesas), who he considered to be the most cunning interrogator.

The torture was extremely severe. For example, the prosecutor's sanction would sometimes be a hundred blows, after which, according to Svarinskas' personal testimony, he would no longer feel pain after twenty to thirty blows and instead become weak and feel as though heat were poured down. Beatings were preferable to the nightime interrogations, when they would beat the prisoner so that he would not fall asleep, which would last for up to five-seven hours, and they would bring the prisoner to the cell at morningtime.

Another method of torture was that the interrogators would lay a person down on a bench, put the person's head so that the Adam's apple was on the edge of the bench and they would press your head down. The other interrogator would sit on the person's legs. Thus, the person could not move because of the pain and they would start beating the person. In addition, sleep deprivation was also used and the victims were kept sleepless. If the person sat down and started dozing off, someone would start screaming to stand up, and after such a day, there would be nightime interrogations.

Svarinskas was kept seven days in solitary confinement. The room, which was 3 by 4 meters, with 2 meters height, had wooden floors and walls, with a large fan in the ceiling. There was nowhere to sit and there was only a three centimer protruding wooden bar on one side of the wall, against which Svarinskas would sit against, but this was uncomfortable, so he would still lay down. Suddenly, the prison guard would pour a bucket of cold water through the crack between the floor and the door, and if the inmate was not quick enough to jump up, he would be all wet. The fan in the ceiling would be turned on and loudly spin. The room was very cold. Living in such conditions, Svarinskas started having thoughts about suicide, but he decided against that:

I decided not to take my own life – they would kill me anyway. I should not destroy my own soul. I prayed a lot and endured those tortures.

He notes that these tortures were completely ignored in his interrogation records. After three months of interrogation and severe torture, he was sentenced to 10 years in a labor camp and an additional 5 years without his civil rights.

== First Gulag (1947–1956) ==
From 1947 to 1956, Svarinskas was imprisoned in the Abez camp in the Komi Republic in northern Russia. In its harsh conditions, he worked as a night watchman and also assisted as a paramedic.

=== Secret ordination in 1954 ===
On October 3, 1954, while still imprisoned, he was secretly ordained as a Catholic priest by Bishop of Telšiai Pranciškus Ramanauskas, who was also a prisoner in the camp.

== Ministry (1956–1958) ==
After his release in 1956, Svarinskas returned to Lithuania on March 29 and began serving in several parishes. The Soviet authorities continued to monitor and pressure him because of his religious and political views.

In 1956–1957 he served as an assistant priest in the parish of Kulautuva (Kaunas district). On Christmas Eve of 1957, Soviet secret services raided his house and found several books from independent interwar Lithuania, most notably "History of Lithuania" by Adolfas Šapoka. From January 1958 he was a vicar for 3 months in the parish of Betygala (Raseiniai district).

== Second Gulag in Mordovia (1958–1964) ==
In April 1958, he was arrested again. The pretext was the Easter procession, that included fifty schoolchildren, as well as his anti-Soviet sermon, and so he was sentenced to 6 years for possession of "anti-Marxist and anti-Soviet" literature.

He was imprisoned in the Dubravlag, located in Mordovia. In 1961, the Supreme Court of LSSR also sentenced him in absentia, recognizing Svarinskas as an especially dangerous recidivist. Svarinskas was transferred to a special regime prison. The main accusation were his priestly activities in the gulag. So, the next two of his years (more exactly twenty-nine months) in the gulag were under particularly severe conditions, called the "Stone Bag" (Russian: Каменный мешок).

Throughout his time spent in the first two gulags, Svarinskas met Petras Paulaitis (who would spend 35 years of his life in Soviet gulags). He also met other prominent people, such as General Jonas Juodišius, prof. Lev Karsavin, Ukrainian Archbishop Josyf Slipyj, Fr. Liudvikas Puzonas, Canon Petras Rauda, Fr. Władysław Bukowiński, and more.

== Ministry in Lithuania (1964–1983) ==
On April 9, 1964, he was released and returned to Lithuania. Only 20 months later, he received permission to work as a priest again, and was constantly monitored by secret services. He was the vicar of the Church of the Holy Trinity in Miroslavas and then the vicar of the Church of the Discovery of the Holy Cross in Kudirkos Naumiestis during the period from 1965 to 1971. Then he was the pastor of the Church of St. Casimir in Igliauka, and also served the Church of the Liberation of St. Peter in Patilčiai, until 1976. Since 1972, he contributed to the underground publication "Chronicle of the Lithuanian Catholic Church".

=== Activism in Viduklė ===
From 1976 to 1983, Svarinskas served as the parish priest in the Church of the Holy Cross of Viduklė. There, he began a new stage of the struggle for Lithuanian independence. He organized religious processions and public celebrations, encouraged Catholics to stand up for their rights, and worked closely with young people in the parish. On November 13, 1978, together with other priests, he founded the Catholic Committee for the Defense of Believers' Rights and published its documents. While serving in Viduklė, in 1981 he renovated the local church and churchyard, where he rebuilt the Chapel of Jesus of Nazareth.

== Third Gulag (1983–1988) ==
On January 26, 1983, he was arrested for the third time in Viduklė. On May 6, 1983, he was sentenced to 7 years in a strict regime camp and 3 years in exile. From 1983 to 1988, he was imprisoned in the strict regime camps of Chusavoy (Perm Oblast, Soviet Russia).

=== Target of Soviet slander ===
The KGB repeatedly tried to tarnish Svarinskas' public image. Thus, on the orders of the KGB, the Lithuanian Film Studios made the libelous propaganda film "Who are you, priest Svarinskai?" („Kas jūs, kunige Svarinskai?“) in 1987 (director Ferdinandas Kauzonas, scriptwriter Justinas Lazauskas, cinematographer Juozas Matonis). While that film was being made, Svarinskas told Kauzonas that:

"If returned now and I was appointed, I would defend the Church again. If the priest does not compromise himself, the godless in Lithuania will be incapable of compromising the priest."

== Exile to the West (1988–1990) ==
In 1988, during a visit to Moscow by U.S. President Ronald Reagan, the issue of Svarinskas' imprisonment was raised with Soviet leader Mikhail Gorbachev. Shortly afterward, he was released from prison.

On July 11, 1988, Svarinskas was released and returned to Viduklė. On August 22, at the Gate of Dawn in Vilnius, Svarinskas offered his farewell Holy Mass and during his sermon in the Church of St. Theresa, he expressed his confusion about the exceptional respect shown to him, as, in his own words, he considered himself an ordinary person who was only trying to perform his duty well. During his sermon, Svarinskas stated that he firmly believed that he would return to Lithuania from forced exile and finally, after the Mass, the entire church, accompanied by the organ, powerfully sang the Lithuanian national anthem. The Lithuanian national anthem had been banned, especially at open events, by the occupying Soviet regime since 1950.

On August 23, he was deported to Germany without the right to return to Lithuania. He lived in Frankfurt am Main. During his time in exile, he visited Lithuanian diaspora across North and South America, Europe, and Australia. He actively spoke about Soviet repression in Lithuania and was an icon of Lithuanian resistance to the whole world. He met with Pope John Paul II as many as 11 times.

== In independent Lithuania ==
After Lithuania restored its independence in 1990, Svarinskas returned to the country on June 19, three months after the Act of the Re-Establishment of the State of Lithuania on March 11, and continued his public and religious work.

He served as the chancellor of Cardinal Vincentas Sladkevičius until 1991. He was elected as a member of the Lithuanian parliament (the Supreme Council–Reconstituent Seimas) until 1992.

From 1991 to 1995 he served as the chief chaplain of the Lithuanian Armed Forces and held the rank of reserve colonel.

Later he continued pastoral work in several parishes and remained active in commemorating Lithuanian partisan fighters and promoting national memory.He was the Rector of Church of St. Michael the Archangel, Kaunas and Assistant Priest of the Minor Church of the Resurrection of Christ in 1997–1998. Then, Svarinskas was the parish priest at Church of St. John the Baptist in Kavarskas. After March 30, 2000, he was the priest-resident of Church of St. Peter and St. Paul in Ukmergė.

== Burial ==
He is buried in the Dukstyna cemetery (Ukmergė district).

== Legacy and Commemoration ==
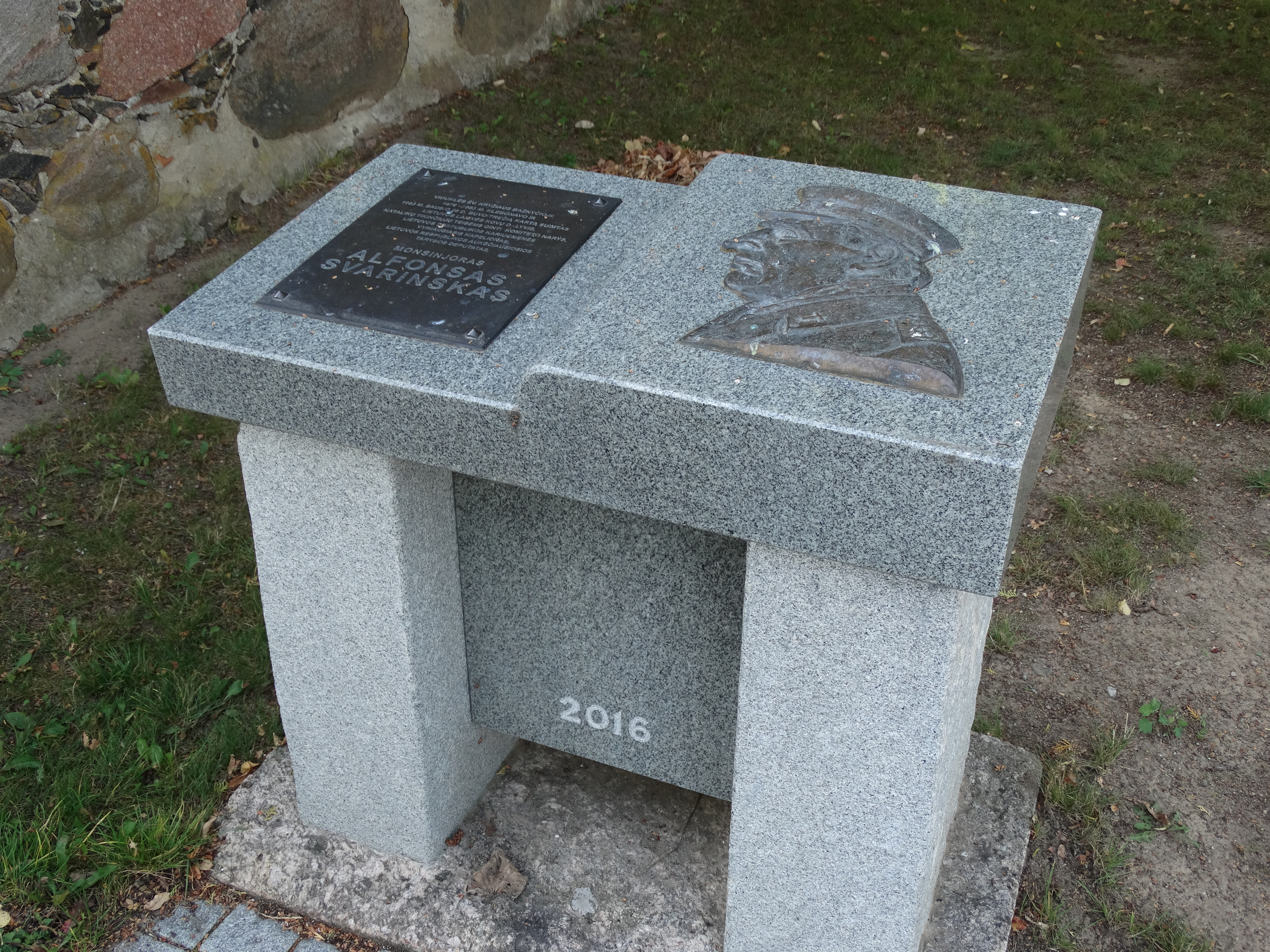
A memorial plaque with a bas-relief near the Viduklė Church, erected in 2017.

In 1996, Svarinskas founded the Didžioji Kova military district Partisan Park in Kadrėnai, and in 2007, he began construction of a monument to Lithuanian Partisans in Kryžkalnis (the Chapel of Kryžkalnis was completed in 2018).

In 2017, LRT Television created the documentary film "Alfonsas Svarinskas". The authors of the film: Andrius Gudauskas (screenwriter), Juozas Sabolius (director), editor Miroslavas Stankevičius.

=== List of honours ===
- 1989 Honorary Citizen of Lecco (Italy)
- 1998 Order of the Cross of Vytis, 3rd degree
- 2000 Independence Medal
- 2001 Lithuanian Armed Forces Creator-Volunteer Medal
- 2009 Honorary Citizen of Raseiniai

=== Monuments ===
- 2017 Memorial plaque with bas-relief in Viduklė (sculptor Osvaldas Neniškis)
- 2018 Monument in the Kryžkalnis Chapel (sculptor Antanas Kmieliauskas)

== Sources ==
- anykstenai.lt (2010). "Alfonsas SVARINSKAS". Anykštėnų biografijų žinynas (in Lithuanian).
- kariuomeneskurejai.lt (2024). "Svarinskas Alfonsas 1925–2014". Lietuvos kariuomenės kūrėjų savanorių sąjunga (in Lithuanian). Archived from the original on 25 July 2024.
- LGGRTC (2014). "Alfonsas Svarinskas". Genocid.lt. Archived from the original on 11 February 2015.
- Kronika (1988). "Dėkojame už auką!". Chronicle of the Catholic Church in Lithuania (in Lithuanian). 79.
- Mačiukas, Žydrūnas (2026). "Apie parodą „Kunigas Legenda. Monsinjoras Alfonsas Svarinskas (1925–2014)"". lrs.lt (in Lithuanian).
- Puidokas, Mindaugas (14 September 2018). "Alfonsas Svarinskas". Visuotinė lietuvių enciklopedija (in Lithuanian).
- raseiniai.lt (2013). "Garbės piliečiai". Raseinių rajono savivaldybė (in Lithuanian). Archived from the original on 2 October 2013.
- veidas.lt (28 July 2014). "Nepataisomasis Dievo ir Lietuvos tarnas". veidas.lt (in Lithuanian).
- VDKM (21 January 2025). "Prieš 100 metų gimė Lietuvos laisvės kovotojas kunigas monsinjoras Alfonsas Svarinskas". vdkaromuziejus.lt (in Lithuanian).
- Žiugždaitė, Saulena (13 October 2017). "A. Svarinsko legenda ir nepatogūs klausimai". Bernardinai (in Lithuanian).

=== Biography ===
- Svarinskas, Alfonsas (2014). Stakišaitis, Donatas; Šulcienė, Lina (eds.). Nepataisomasis: Monsinjoro Alfonso Svarinsko atsiminimai (PDF) (in Lithuanian). Vol. I. Vilnius: Versmė. ISBN 978-9955-589-91-4.
- Svarinskas, Alfonsas (2018). Stakišaitis, Donatas; Šulcienė, Lina (eds.). Nepataisomasis: Monsinjoro Alfonso Svarinsko atsiminimai (PDF) (in Lithuanian). Vol. II. Vilnius: Versmė. ISBN 978-609-474-120-3.
