= Brick Renaissance =

Revival of European architecture style

Brick Renaissance is the Northern European continuation of brick architecture after Brick Romanesque and Brick Gothic. Although the term Brick Gothic is often used generally for all of this architecture, especially in regard to the Hanseatic cities of the Baltic, the stylistic changes that led to the end of Gothic architecture did reach Northern Germany and northern Europe with delay, leading to the adoption of Renaissance elements into brick building. Nonetheless, it is very difficult for non-experts to distinguish transitional phases or early Brick Renaissance, as the style maintained many typical features of Brick Gothic, such as stepped gables. A clearer distinction only developed at the transition to Baroque architecture. In Lübeck, for example, Brick Renaissance is clearly recognisable in buildings equipped with terracotta reliefs by the artist Statius von Düren, who was also active at Schwerin (Schwerin Castle) and Wismar (Fürstenhof).

More clearly recognisable as Renaissance are brick buildings strongly influenced by the Dutch Renaissance style, such as Reinbek Castle at Reinbek near Hamburg, the Zeughaus at Lübeck, or Friedrichstadt in Schleswig-Holstein.

== Belarus ==
Place	Building	Main period of construction	Special features	Image
Mir	Mir Castle	15th–16th century	late 16th century additions to Gothic structure	

== Denmark ==
Place	Building	Main period of construction	Special features	Image
Copenhagen	Børsen	1619–1640	Dutch Renaissance style (architects Hans and Lorents van Steenwinckel)	
Copenhagen	Rosenborg Castle	1606–1624	built in the Dutch Renaissance style by Architects Bertel Lange and Hans van Steenwinckel	
Hillerød	Frederiksborg Castle	1602–1620	Dutch Renaissance style (architects Hans and Lorents van Steenwinckel)	

== Germany ==
Place	Building	Main period of construction	Special features	Image
Friedrichstadt	Market Square	early 17th century	plastered brick	
Lübeck	Mühlentor	1550s (model)		
Lübeck	Schiffergesellschaft	1535–1538		
Lübeck	Zeughaus	1594		
Reinbek	Castle	1572–1576		

== Italy ==
Place	Building	Main period of construction	Special features	Image
Ferrara	Castello Estense	1385–1450, early 16th century	the castle essentially presents the appearance given to it by Girolamo da Carpi in the second half of the 16th century	
Milan	Castello Sforzesco	14th century, 1450		

== Lithuania ==
Town/city	Building	Main period of construction	Special features	Image
Vytėnai	Panemunė Castle	1604–1610		
Raudondvaris	Raudondvaris Castle	16th century, 1615	rebuilt 1653–1664	
Siesikai	Siesikai Castle	c. 1517		
Jonava	St. Anne's Church in Skaruliai	c. 1622		

== Poland ==
Place	Building	Main period of construction	Special features	Image
Brochów	Fortified church St. Rochus	1551–1561, 1596	Gothic-Renaissance church established by Jan Brochowski and his family as a three-nave church with three side towers	
Bydgoszcz	Poor Clares' Church	1582–1645		
Gdańsk	Green Gate	1564–1568	example of the Flemish Mannerism in the city inspired by the Antwerp City Hall (architect Regnier van Amsterdam)	
Gdańsk	Old Arsenal	1602–1605	built in Dutch/Flemish Mannerism by Anthonis van Obbergen, Jan Strakowski and Abraham van den Blocke	
Gołąb	Church of the Assumption with Saints Catherine and Florian	1628–1638	Polish Mannerism style	
Grocholin	fortified manor house	16th century	built for Wojciech Baranowski, is a rare example of defense housing architecture in northern Poland	
Piotrków Trybunalski	Royal Castle	1512–1519	Gothic-Renaissance	
Płock	Płock Cathedral Dome	1531–1534	Romanesque cathedral, rebuilt several times	
Pułtusk	Collegiate Church Pułtusk vault	1551–1556	Renaissance frescoes on the vault cover more than 1000 square meters in total (brick church built between 1449 and the first half of the 16th century)	
Sandomierz	Town Hall	14th century	rebuilt in the Renaissance style in the 16th century	
Supraśl	Orthodox Monastery: Church of the Annunciation	1503–1511	Gothic-Renaissance, destroyed in 1944 by retreating German army, rebuilt since 1985	
Tarnów	Mikołajowski House	15th century	rebuilt in the Renaissance style in 1524	
Tarnów	Town Hall	14th century	rebuilt in the Renaissance style in the 16th century	
Zamość	Zamość Fortress	1579–1618		

== Sweden ==
Place	Building	Main period of construction	Special features	Image
Kristianstad	Holy Trinity Church (Swedish: Helga Trefaldighetskyrkan)	1617–1628	the city of Kristianstad was founded by king Christian IV of Denmark in 1614 at a time when Scania was part of the Kingdom of Denmark (until 1658)	
Mariefred	Gripsholm Castle	1537–	built on the site of a medieval castle, which is partly preserved in the current castle	
Stockholm	Swedish House of Nobility (Swedish: Riddarhuset)	1641–1675	the building is more or less unchanged since its construction	
Trolle-Ljungby parish	Trolle-Ljungby Castle	1620s–1630s	the castle was mainly constructed when Scania was part of the Kingdom of Denmark (until 1658)	
