= Vepriai Eldership =

Eldership of Lithuania

The Vepriai Eldership (Lithuanian: Veprių seniūnija) is an eldership of Lithuania, located in the Ukmergė District Municipality. In 2021 its population was 959.
