= Vidiškiai Eldership (Ukmergė) =

Eldership of Lithuania

The Vidiškiai Eldership (Lithuanian: Vidiškių seniūnija) is an eldership of Lithuania, located in the Ukmergė District Municipality. In 2021 its population was 2361.
