= Gediminas Motuza =

Lithuanian geologist and author

Gediminas Motuza-Matuzevičius (born 24 August 1946 in Vilnius) is a Lithuanian geologist and author of geology textbooks. He is currently professor in the Faculty of the Natural Sciences at Vilnius University and honorary professor of the Polish Academy of Sciences.

Motuza was born to a Lithuanian–Latvian family of a painter and a linguist. After graduating from high school in 1963, he earned his A.B. degree from Vilnius University, Faculty of Natural Science in 1968. He started his career at the Institute of Mathematics and Cybernetics of the Lithuanian Academy of Sciences as an engineer-geologist. From 1969 to 1973 he studied for a PhD degree at the Institute for Mineralogy, Geochemistry and Crystal Chemistry of Rare Elements in Moscow, where he defended his dissertation East Transbaikal Ore Deposit Location Pattern Study Based on Mathematical Statistics Methods. During this period he worked in the Pamir and Altai Mountains, and in the Transbaikal area.

Between 1982 and 1984, Motuza worked as a consultant for the Mozambique National Academy of Sciences. In 1984, he joined the Lithuanian Institute of Geology and Geography. In 1990 he was elected head of the Lithuanian Geological Society. Since 2003 he has been lecturing at the Department of Geology and Mineralogy of Vilnius University.

Motuza took part in a variety of governmental missions, including delineation of the state border between Lithuania, Russia and Latvia. He discovered the Mizarai crater in Lithuania and identified the Vepriai crater in Lithuania and the Dobele crater in Latvia.
