= Želva Eldership =

Eldership of Lithuania

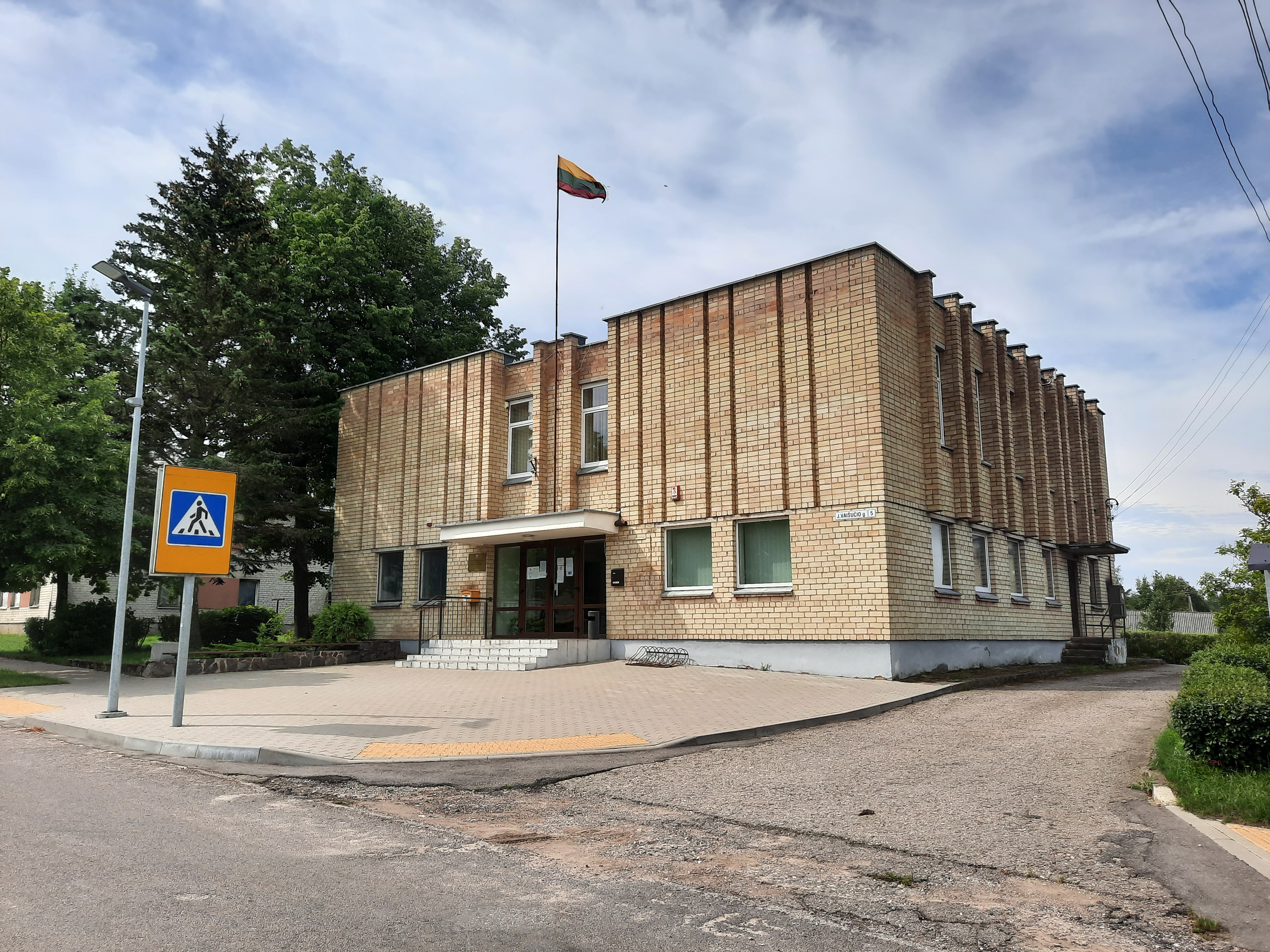
Želva Eldership headquarters

The Želva Eldership (Lithuanian: Želvos seniūnija) is an eldership of Lithuania, located in the Ukmergė District Municipality. In 2021 its population was 908.
