= Žemaitkiemis Eldership =

Eldership of Lithuania

Coordinates: 55.305°N 24.975°E

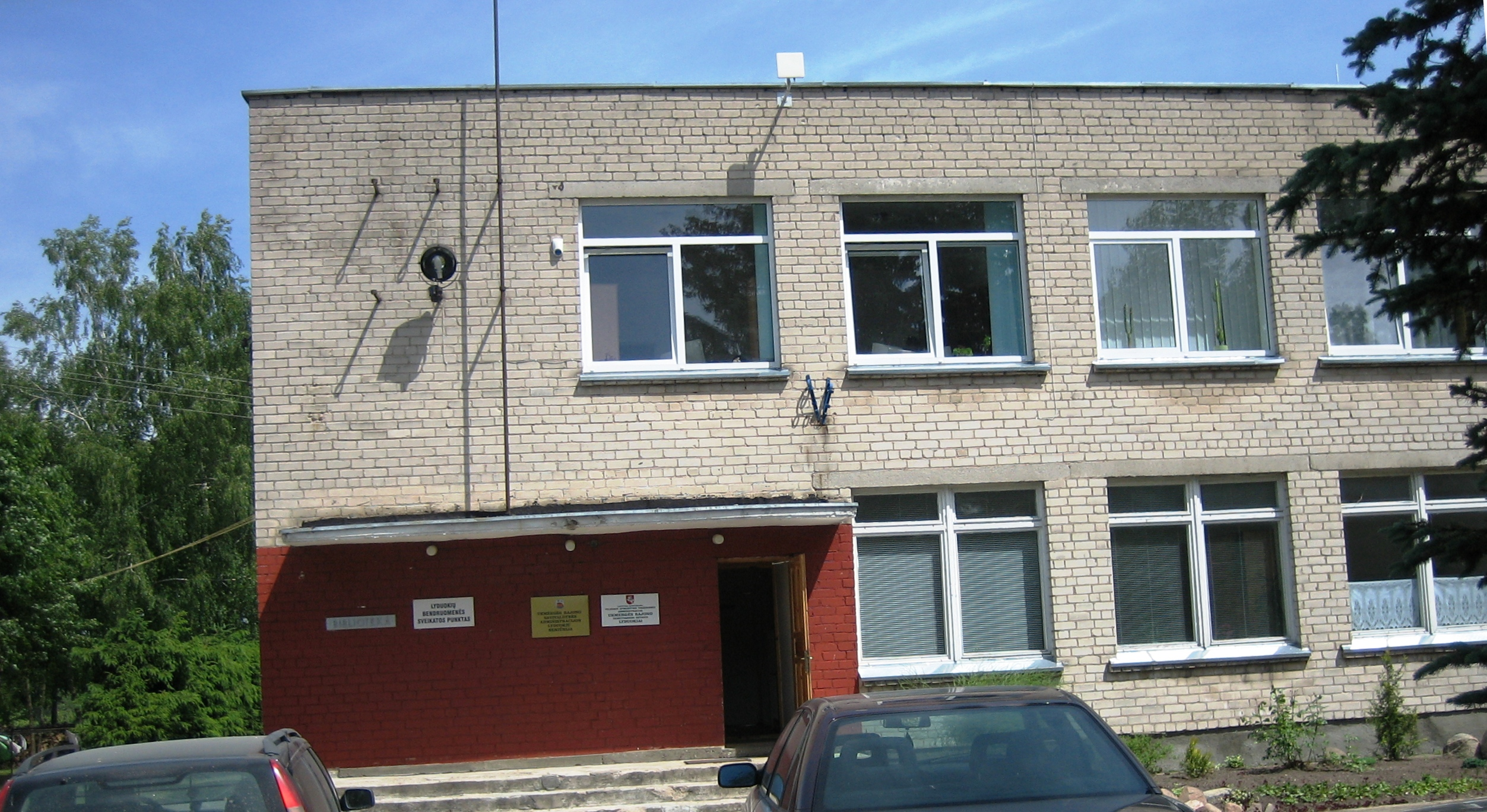
Žemaitkiemis eldership

The Žemaitkiemis Eldership (Lithuanian: Žemaitkiemio seniūnija) is an eldership of Lithuania, located in the Ukmergė District Municipality. In 2021 its population was 566.
