= Paliepiai =

- Village
- Location of Paliepiai
- Coordinates: 55°22′40″N 22°58′10″E
- Country: Lithuania
- Ethnographic region: Aukštaitija
- County: Kaunas County
- Municipality: Radviliškis district municipality
- Eldership: Paliepiai eldership
- Capital of: Paliepiai eldership

Population (2001)
  - Total: 518
- Time zone: UTC+2 (EET)
  - Summer (DST): UTC+3 (EEST)

Paliepiai is a village in Lithuania located 6 km east of Viduklė. According to the 2001 census, it had 518 residents.
