= Šešuoliai =

- Town
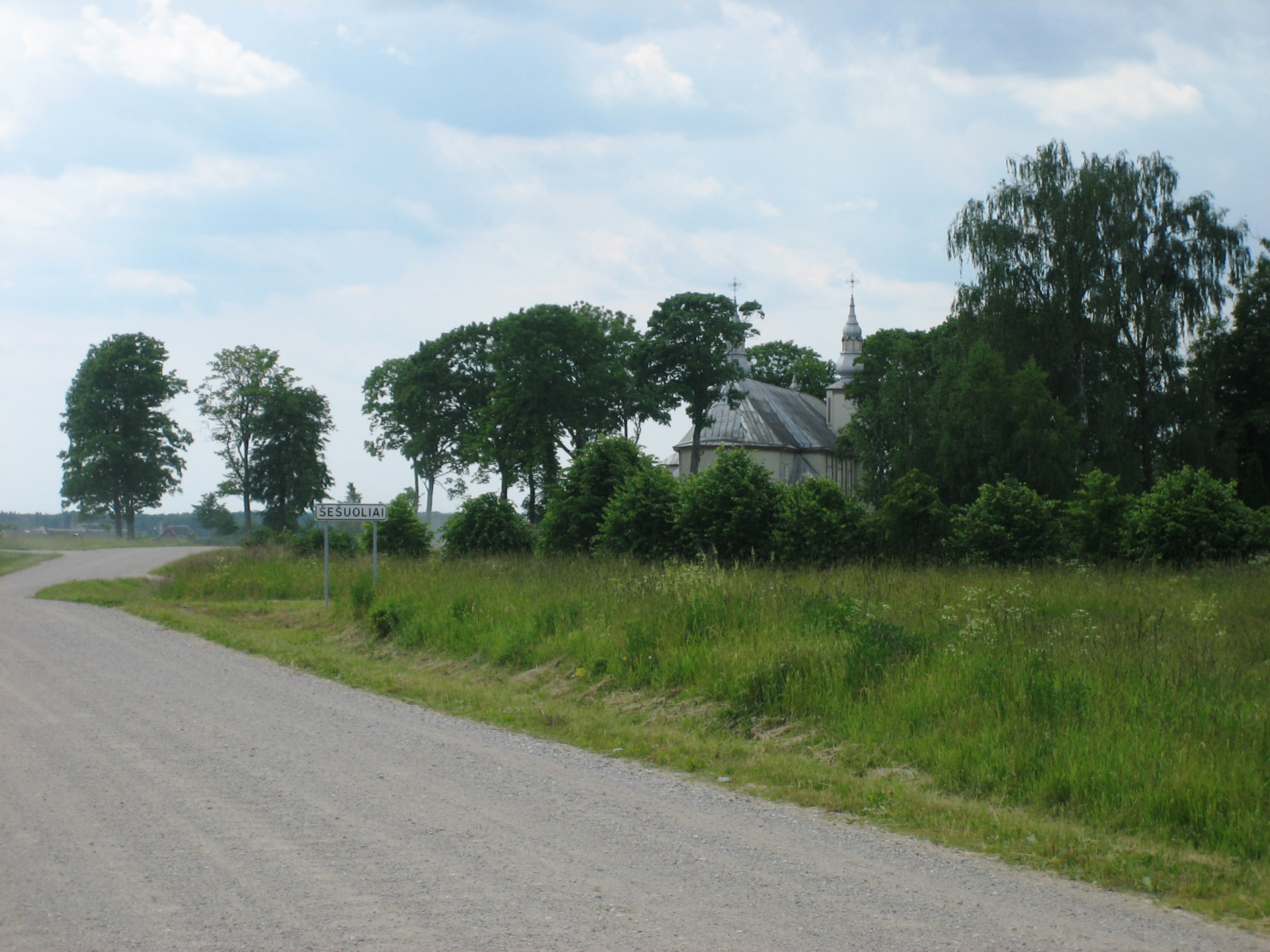

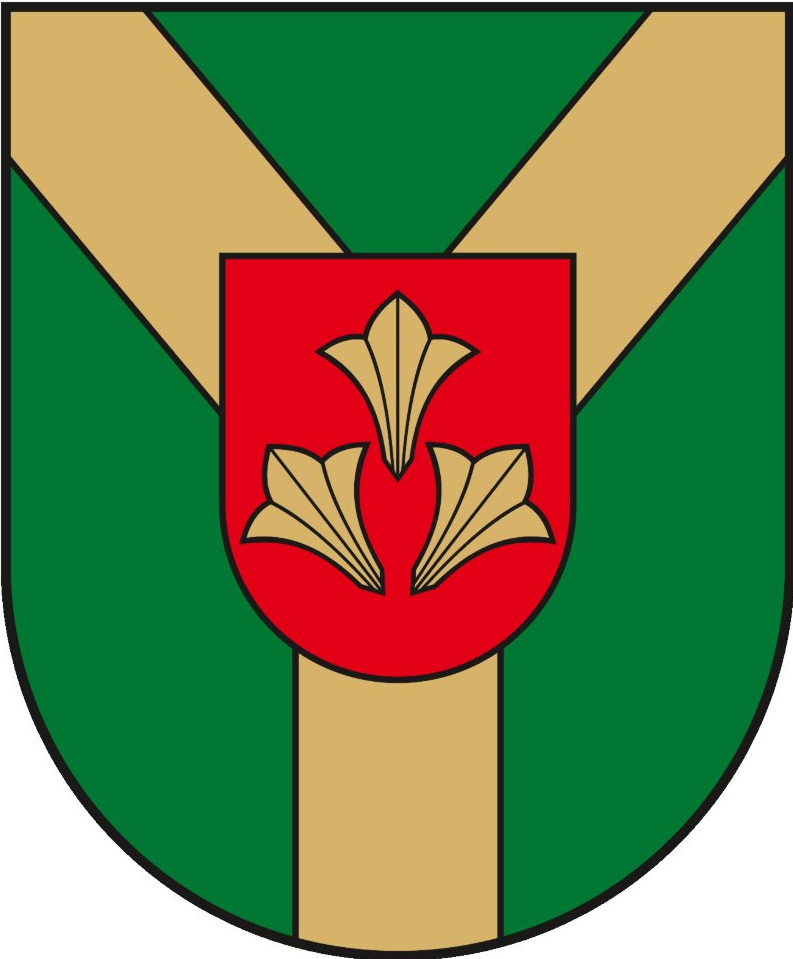
- Coat of arms

- Location of Šešuoliai
- Coordinates: 55°10′41″N 24°58′19″E
- Country: Lithuania
- County: Vilnius County
- Municipality: Ukmergė district municipality
- Eldership: Šešuoliai eldership
- First mentioned: 1334

Population (2011)
  - Total: 138
- Time zone: UTC+2 (EET)
  - Summer (DST): UTC+3 (EEST)

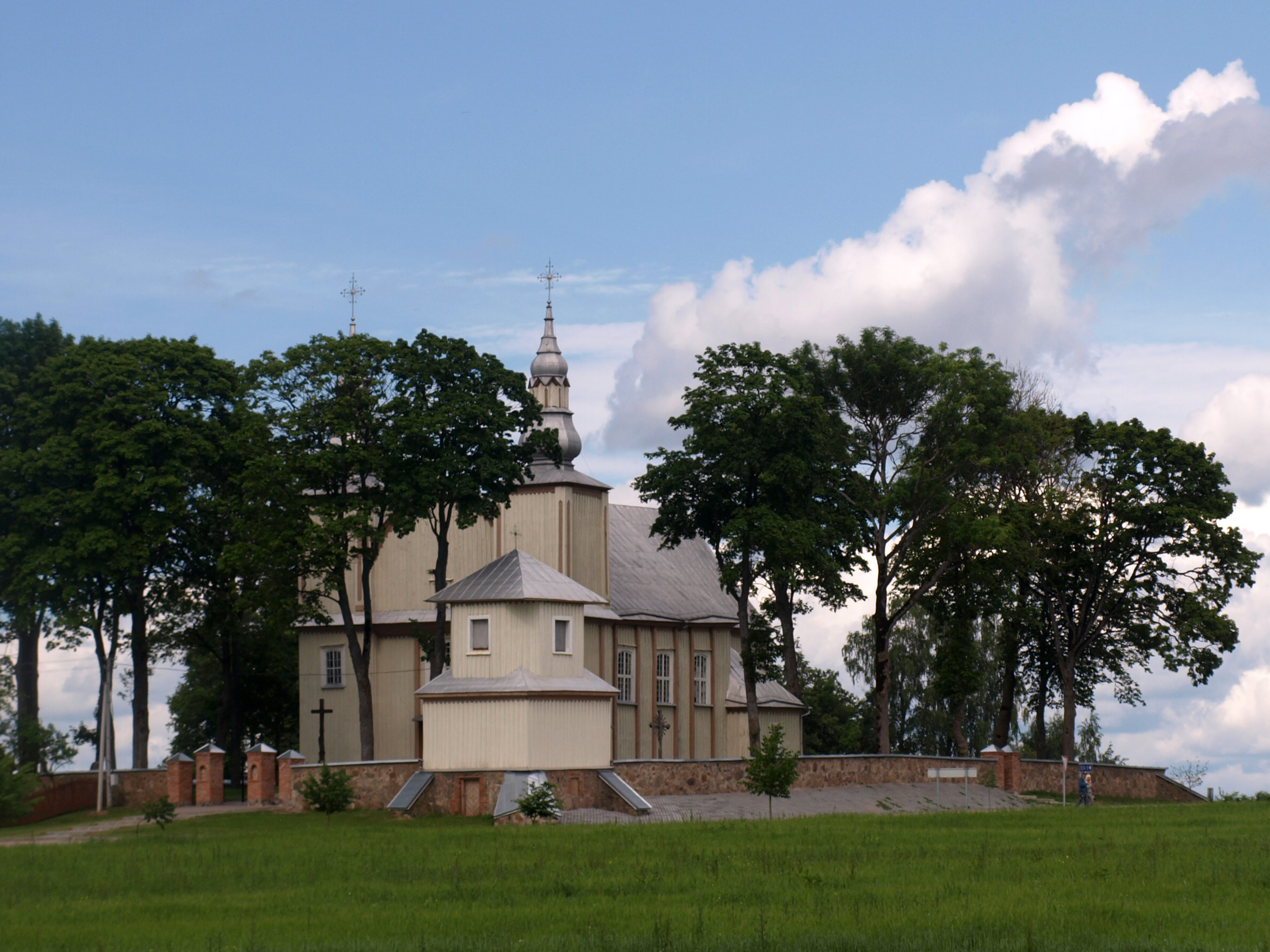
Church of Šešuoliai

Šešuoliai is a small town in central Lithuania. It is located just east of Lake Šešuoliai. According to the Lithuanian census of 2011, it had 138 residents. The town's central square and street layout is protected as an urban monument.

Its alternate names include Šašuoliai, Šešuolių, Shesholi, Sheshuolyay, Sušuoliai, and Szeszole.

== History ==
The town was first mentioned in the Chronicle of Hermann von Wartberge when it was attacked by the Livonian Order in 1334. Since the times of Grand Duke Vytautas, there was an estate, which became a property of Kristinas Astikas. Sometime before 1478, Šešuoliai passed to the Bishop of Vilnius. Bishop Walerian Protasewicz sponsored construction of a Catholic church and establishment of a parish. Protasewicz also directed the priests to open a parish school, but it is known only from 1777. The settlement grew into a town and center of a volost. The town burned down in 1656 during the Russo-Polish War. Šešuoliai recovered; the church was reconstructed in 1698 and 1751. The priests sponsored a parish school and a shelter for the poor. Šešuoliai Manor had a library and alcohol distillery. During the interwar years it was briefly owned by Jonas Variakojis. Today it is a school building. The town had 100 residents in 1814, 64 in 1845, 169 in 1890, 317 in 1923, 156 in 1959, 193 in 1970, and 123 in 1979.

In the summer of 1941, a number of Jews from the town were marched to (they were told) Želva. They were murdered by local Lithuanian collaborators on the outskirts of the forest as soon as they left the shtetl.
