= Deltuva Eldership =

Eldership of Lithuania

The Deltuva Eldership (Lithuanian: Deltuvos seniūnija) is an eldership of Lithuania, located in the Ukmergė District Municipality. In 2021 its population was 2374.
