= Taujėnai Eldership =

Eldership of Lithuania

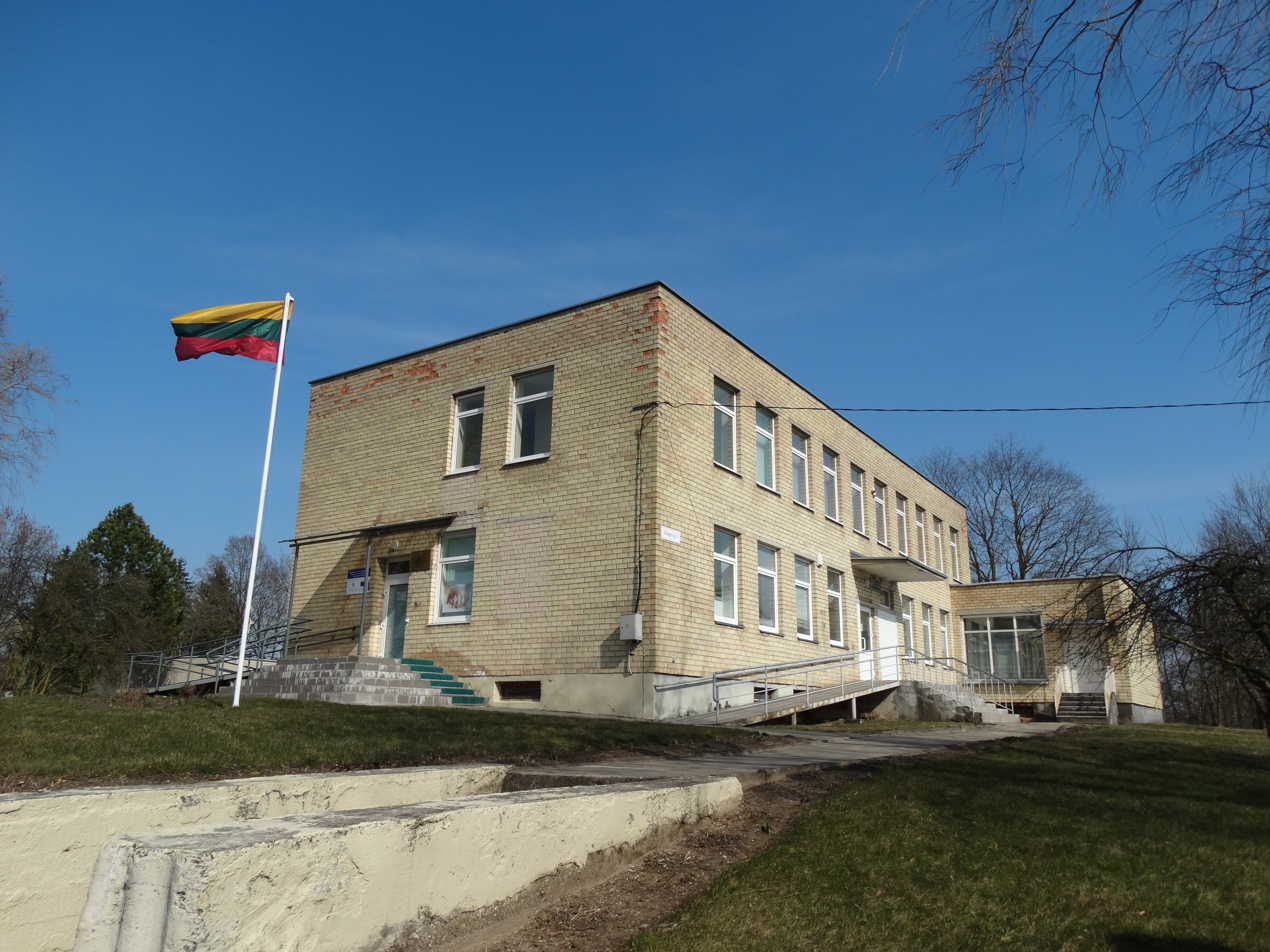
A building in the eldership, 2016

The Taujėnai Eldership (Lithuanian: Taujėnų seniūnija) is an eldership of Lithuania, located in the Ukmergė District Municipality. In 2021 its population was 1222.
