= Mizarai crater =

Asteroid impact crater in Lithuania

Coordinates: 54°1′N 23°54′E

- Location: Druskininkai municipality, Lithuania

Impact crater structure
- Confidence: confirmed
- Diameter: 5 km (3.1 mi)
- Depth: 250 m (820 ft)
- Age: 500 ± 20 Ma

Mizarai is a meteorite impact crater in Druskininkai municipality, Lithuania. The crater, being the second largest in the country, is not exposed to the surface and the site now hosts Mizarai village. The crater is about 5 km (3.1 mi) in diameter and about 250 m (820 ft) in depth. It was created by an asteroid, estimated 300 m (980 ft) in diameter, 500 ± 20 or 570 ± 50 million years ago (Cambrian or Neoproterozoic). The asteroid hit basement rock and shattered it up to 1.3 km (0.81 mi) deep. It was later buried under various sediments. Mizarai crater was discovered by Gediminas Motuza during an international seismic survey Eurobridge, which reached depths of 90–100 km (56–62 mi).

== See also ==
- Vepriai crater
