= Lyduokiai Eldership =

Eldership of Lithuania

The Lyduokiai Eldership (Lithuanian: Lyduokių seniūnija) is an eldership of Lithuania, located in the Ukmergė District Municipality. In 2021 its population was 908.
