= Siesikai Castle =

Island castle in Trakai, Lithuania

- Siesikai pilis (Lithuanian)
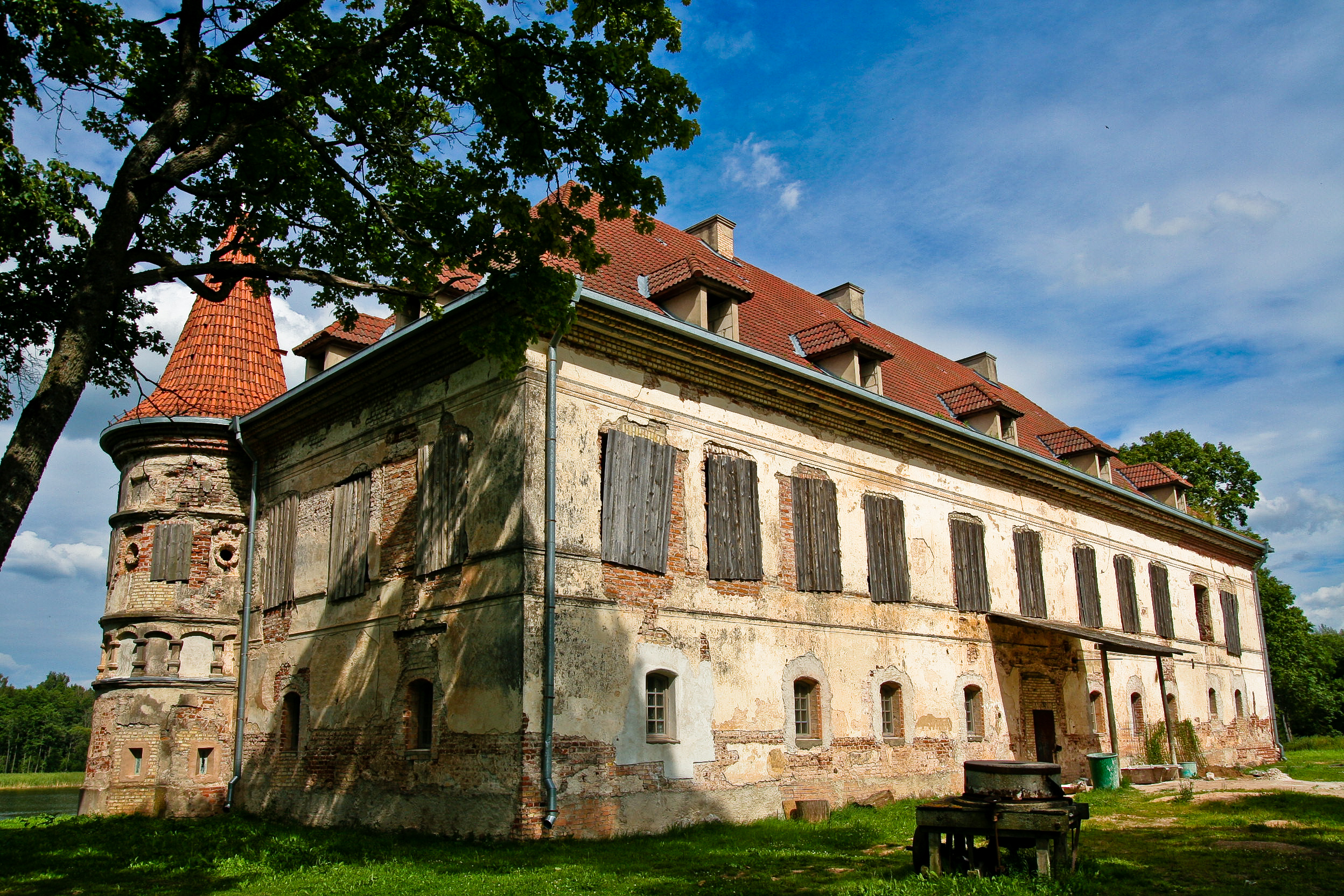
- Siesikai Castle

- Location within Lithuania
- Interactive map of Siesikai Castle
- 55°17′12″N 24°30′49″E
- Type: Castle
- Location: Siesikai, Lithuania

History
- Built: 16th century
- Built for: Gabrielius Daumantas-Siesickis

Site notes
- Architectural style: Brick Gothic
- Restored: 1900-
- Owner: Ukmergė District Municipality

Cultural Monuments of Lithuania
- Type: National
- Designated: 13 February 2008
- Reference no.: 1020

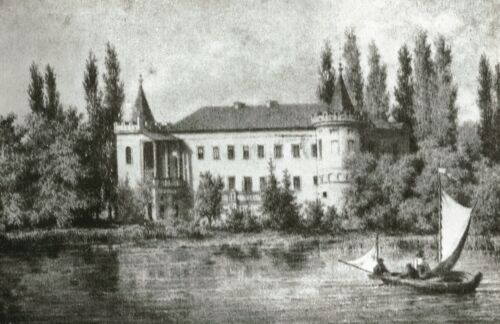
Siesikai Castle in 19th century

Siesikai Castle is a residential castle near Siesikai, Ukmergė district, Lithuania. The castle on the Siesikai Lake was built by Gabrielius Daumantas-Siesickis in the 16th century in the Renaissance style. His heirs were known as Daumantai, also called Siesicki, had given their family name to the nearby town. The masonry palace was reconstructed in the Neoclassical style after 1820 by Dominik Dowgiałło. Only two towers remain from the former castle, which originally had four towers, one in every corner of the palace. The castle has been undergoing restoration since 1990.

In 2018, the manor homestead was transferred to the Ukmergė District Municipality Administration which in turn transferred the building to the Ukmergė Local History Museum in 2019 and established a branch of this museum.

== See also ==
- Castles in Lithuania
