= Aaron Klug =

British biophysicist and chemist (1926–2018)

Sir Aaron Klug OM FRS FMedSci HonFRMS
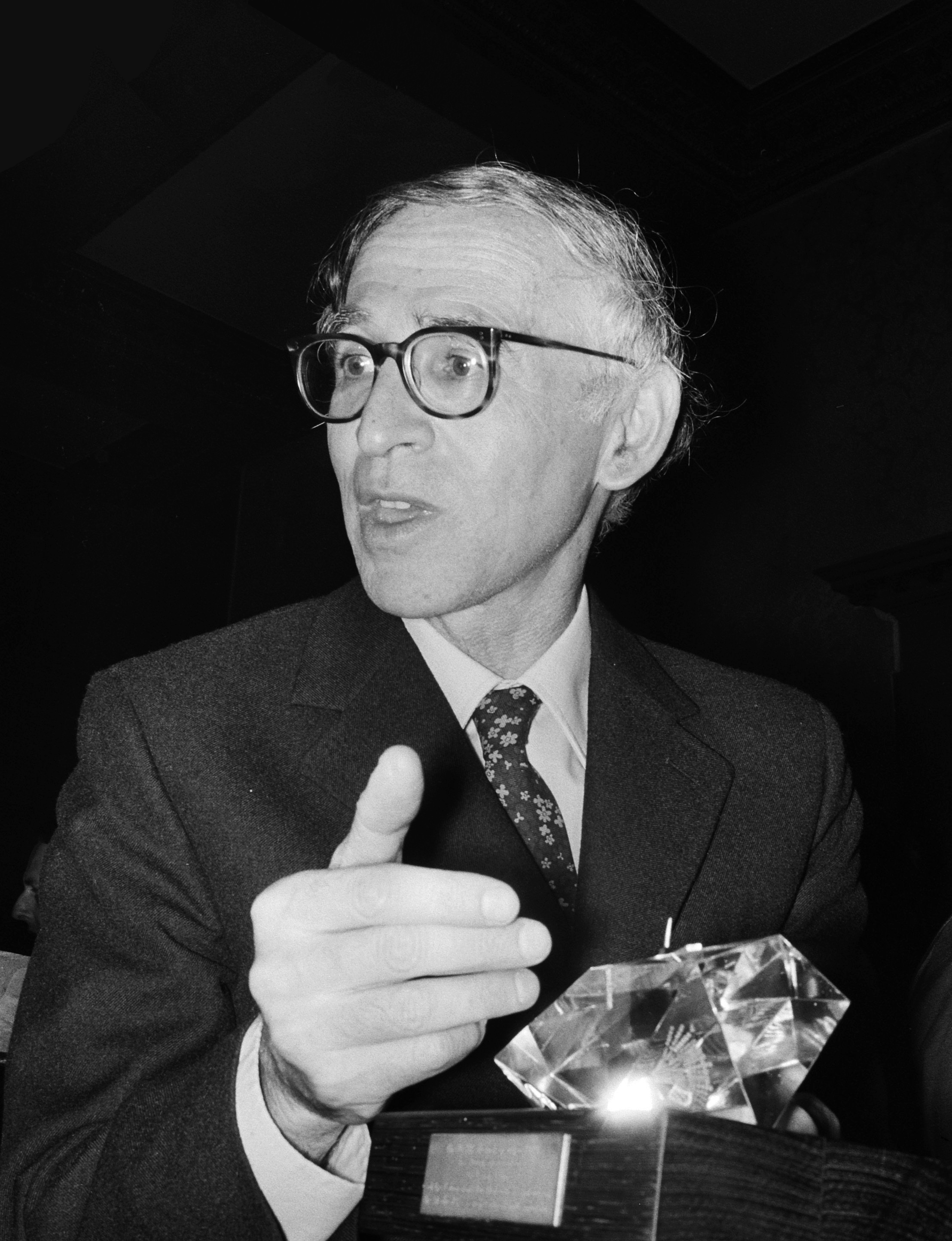
- Aaron Klug in 1979
- Born: 11 August 1926; Pazelva, Lithuania
- Died: 20 November 2018 (aged 92); Cambridge, Cambridgeshire, England
- Education: University of the Witwatersrand (BSc); University of Cape Town (MSc); University of Cambridge (PhD)
- Known for: Crystallographic electron microscopy
- Spouse: Liebe Bobrow (m. 1948)
- Children: Two
- Awards: Louisa Gross Horwitz Prize (1981); Nobel Prize in Chemistry (1982); Copley Medal (1985); Knighted 1988; OM 1995
- Scientific career
- Fields: Biophysics; Chemistry
- Workplaces: Peterhouse, Cambridge; Birkbeck, University of London; Laboratory of Molecular Biology
- Thesis: The kinetics of phase changes in solids (1953)
- Doctoral advisor: Douglas Hartree
- Website: www2.mrc-lmb.cam.ac.uk/about-lmb/archive-and-alumni/alumni/aaron-klug/

Sir Aaron Klug (11 August 1926 – 20 November 2018) was a British biophysicist and chemist. He was a winner of the 1982 Nobel Prize in Chemistry for his development of crystallographic electron microscopy and his structural elucidation of biologically important nucleic acid-protein complexes.

== Early life and education ==
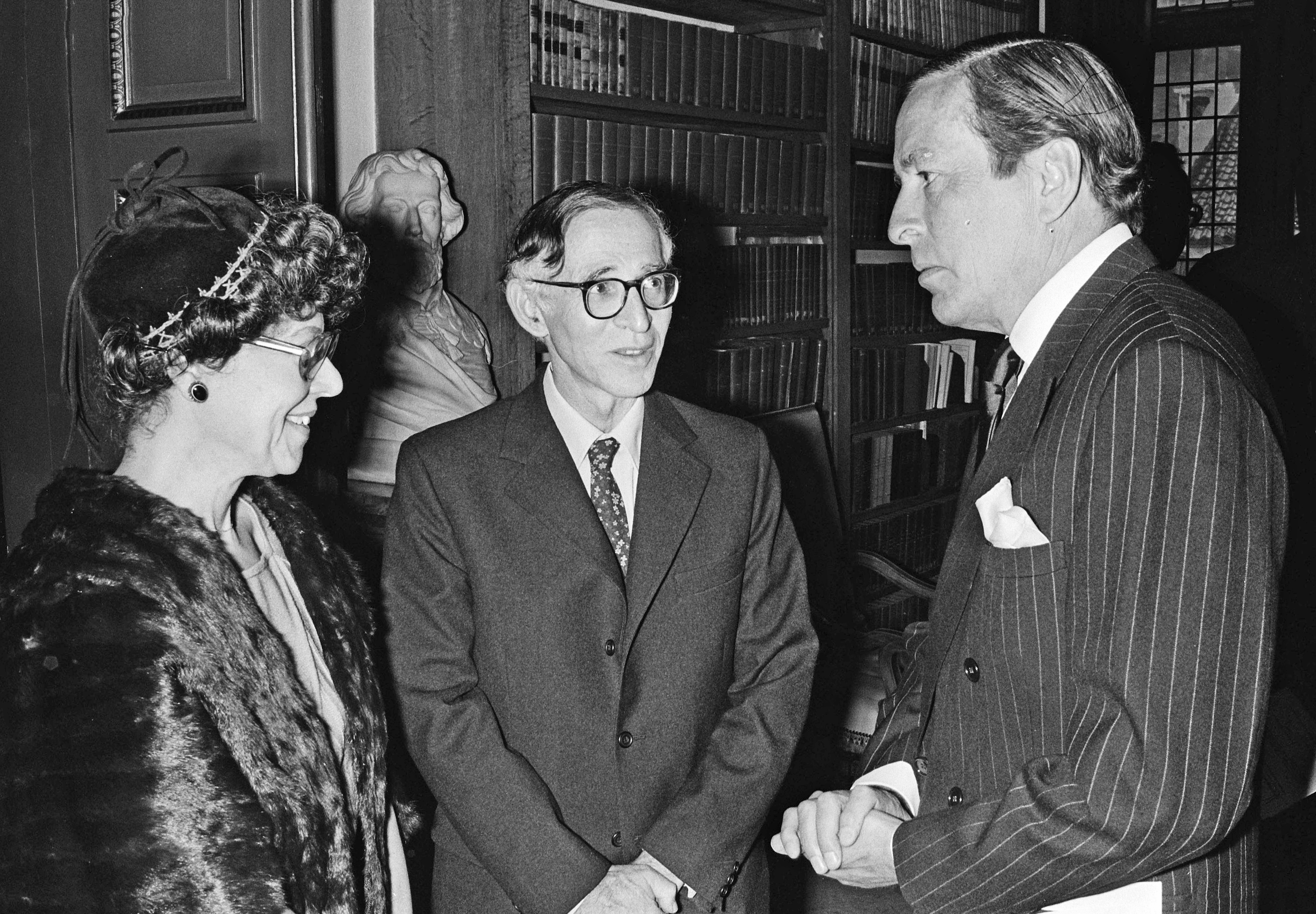
From right to left: Prince Claus of the Netherlands, Aaron Klug and his wife Liebe Bobrow, 1979

Klug was born on 11 August 1926 in the Shtetl of Pazelva, Lithuania (present-day Želva) to Lazar Klug, a drover and horseman, and Bella Klug (née Silin; died 1932). The youngest of two brothers, Klug was raised in a Yiddish speaking Lithuanian–Jewish household. In 1928, the family emigrated to Durban, Union of South Africa (present-day South Africa) where his father found work as a saddler. Following his mother's death from pneumonia in 1932, Klug's maternal aunt, Rose, lived with the family. Rose and Klug's father later married, and had two children.

Receiving both a secular and traditional Jewish education, Klug was educated at Durban High School where the 1926 book Microbe Hunters by Paul de Kruif aroused his interest in microbiology. In 1941, aged 15, Klug won a scholarship to study medicine in Johannesburg at the University of the Witwatersrand. After a year he switched to studying science, and later graduated with a degree in physics, chemistry, and mathematics. At the urging of a friend, Klug joined the Johannesburg branch of Hashomer Hatzair Zionist youth movement where meet his future wife Liebe Bobrow.

He studied physics under Reginald W. James and obtained his Master of Science degree at the University of Cape Town. He was awarded an 1851 Research Fellowship from the Royal Commission for the Exhibition of 1851, which enabled him to move to England, completing his PhD in research physics at Trinity College, Cambridge in 1953.

== Career and research ==
Following his PhD, Klug moved to Birkbeck College in the University of London in late 1953, and started working with chemist and X-ray crystallographer Rosalind Franklin in the lab of crystallographer John Bernal. This experience aroused a lifelong interest in the study of viruses, and during his time there he made discoveries in the structure of the tobacco mosaic virus. In 1962 he moved to the newly built Medical Research Council (MRC) Laboratory of Molecular Biology (LMB) in Cambridge. Over the following decade Klug used methods from X-ray diffraction, microscopy and structural modelling to develop crystallographic electron microscopy in which a sequence of two-dimensional images of crystals taken from different angles are combined to produce three-dimensional images of the target. He studied the structure of transfer RNA, and found what is known as zinc fingers as well as the neurofibrils in Alzheimer's disease.

Also in 1962, Klug became a Fellow of Peterhouse, Cambridge. He was later made an Honorary Fellow of the college.

Between 1986 and 1996, Klug was director of the LMB. He served on the Advisory Council for the Campaign for Science and Engineering. He also served on the Board of Scientific Governors at The Scripps Research Institute. He and Dai Rees approached the Wellcome Trust to found the Wellcome Sanger Institute, which was a key player in the Human Genome Project.

=== Awards and honours ===
Klug was awarded the Louisa Gross Horwitz Prize from Columbia University in 1981. He was knighted by Elizabeth II in 1988. In 1969 he was elected a Fellow of the Royal Society (FRS), the oldest national scientific institution in the world. He was elected its President (PRS) from 1995 to 2000. He was appointed to the Order of Merit in 1995 – as is customary for Presidents of the Royal Society. His certificate of election to the Royal Society reads:

Mathematical physicist and crystallographer distinguished for his contributions to molecular biology, especially the structure of viruses. Development of a theory of simultaneous temperature and phase changes in steels led him to apply related mathematical methods to the problem of diffusion and chemical reactions of gases in thin layers of haemoglobin solutions and in red blood cells. Then the late Rosalind Franklin introduced him to the x-ray study of tobacco mosaic virus to which he contributed by his application and further development of Cochran and Crick's theory of diffraction from helical chain molecules. Klug's most important work is concerned with the structure of spherical viruses. Together with D. Caspar he developed a general theory of spherical shells built up of a regular array of asymmetric particles. Klug and his collaborators verified the theory by x-ray and electron microscope studies, thereby revealing new and hitherto unsuspected features of virus structure.

Klug was a member of the American Academy of Arts and Sciences and the American Philosophical Society

In 2000, Klug received the Golden Plate Award of the American Academy of Achievement. In 2005, he was awarded South Africa's Order of Mapungubwe (gold) for exceptional achievements in medical science. He was elected a Fellow of the Academy of Medical Sciences (FMedSci), also in 2005.

In 2013, Israel's Ben-Gurion University of the Negev dedicated their centre for structural biology in Klug's name, Aaron Klug Integrated Centre for Biomolecular Structure. He, his family and the then-British Ambassador to Israel Matthew Gould, were in attendance. Klug was associated with the university and the town of Be'er Sheva, having visited them numerous times.

== Personal life ==
Klug married Liebe Bobrow in 1948; they had two sons, one of whom predeceased them in 2000. He died on 20 November 2018 in Cambridge.

Though Klug had faced discrimination in South Africa, he remained religious and according to Sydney Brenner, he became more religious in his older age.

== See also ==
- List of presidents of the Royal Society
- List of Jewish Nobel laureates

Professional and academic associations
Preceded by Michael Atiyah	58th President of the Royal Society; 1995–2000	Succeeded by Robert May
