= Lyduokiai =

- Town
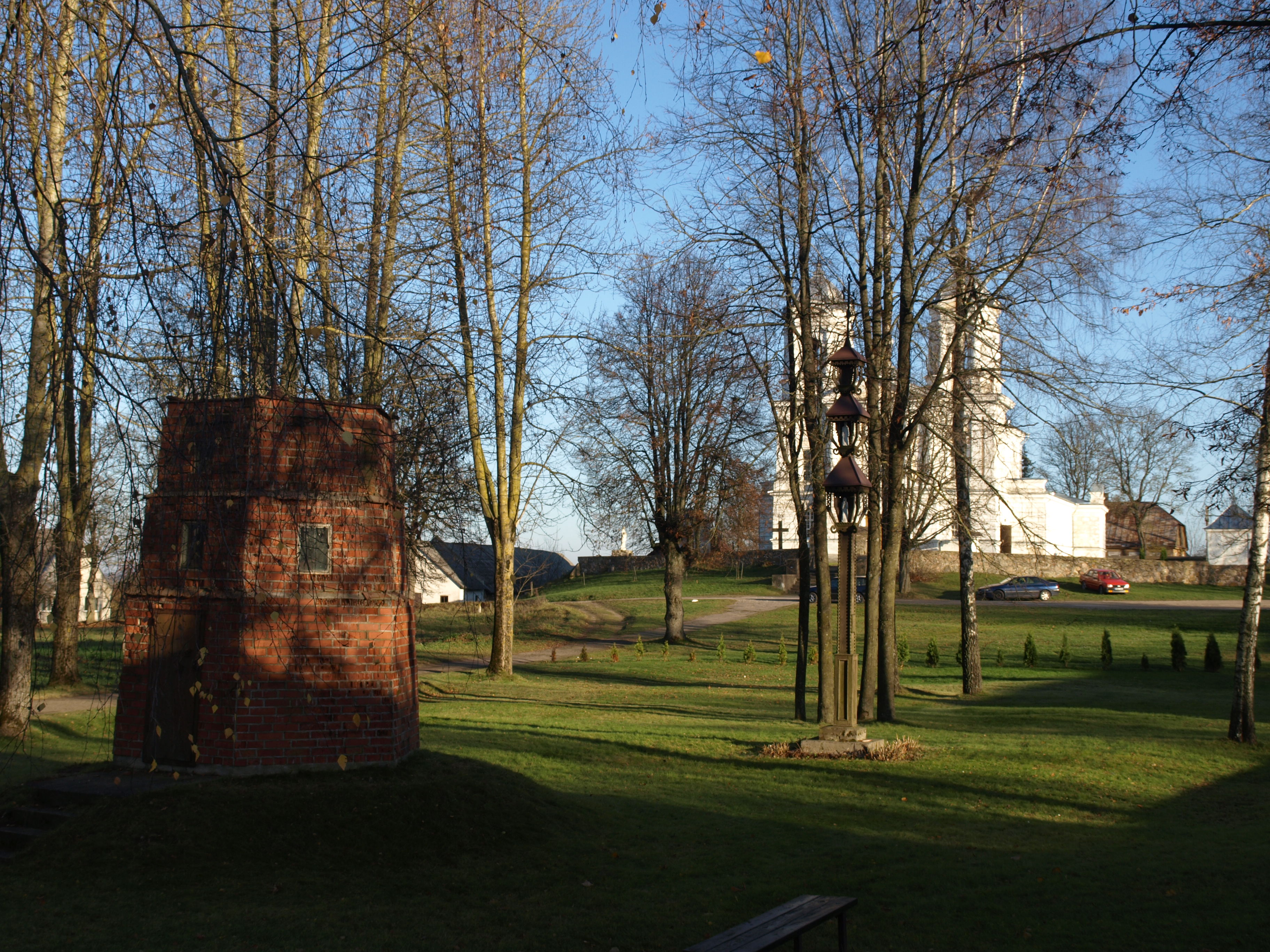

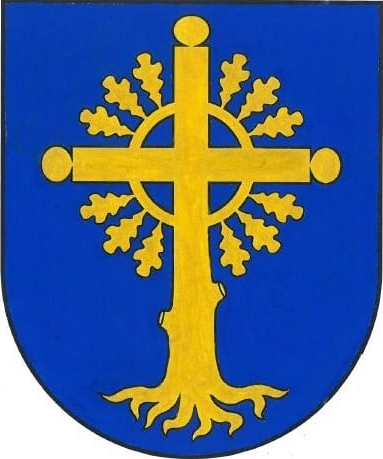
- Coat of arms

- Location of Lyduokiai in Lithuania
- Coordinates: 55°16′01″N 24°56′49″E
- Country: Lithuania
- County: Vilnius County
- Municipality: Ukmergė district municipality
- Eldership: Lyduokiai eldership

Population (2026)
  - Total: 260
- Time zone: UTC+2 (EET)
  - Summer (DST): UTC+3 (EEST)

Lyduokiai is a town in Ukmergė district municipality, Vilnius County, east Lithuania. According to the Lithuanian census of 2011, the town has a population of 142 people. The town has a Catholic church.

Its alternate names include Liduokyay, Lyduokių, Lyduokliai, and Nidoki (Polish).
