= Vepriai =

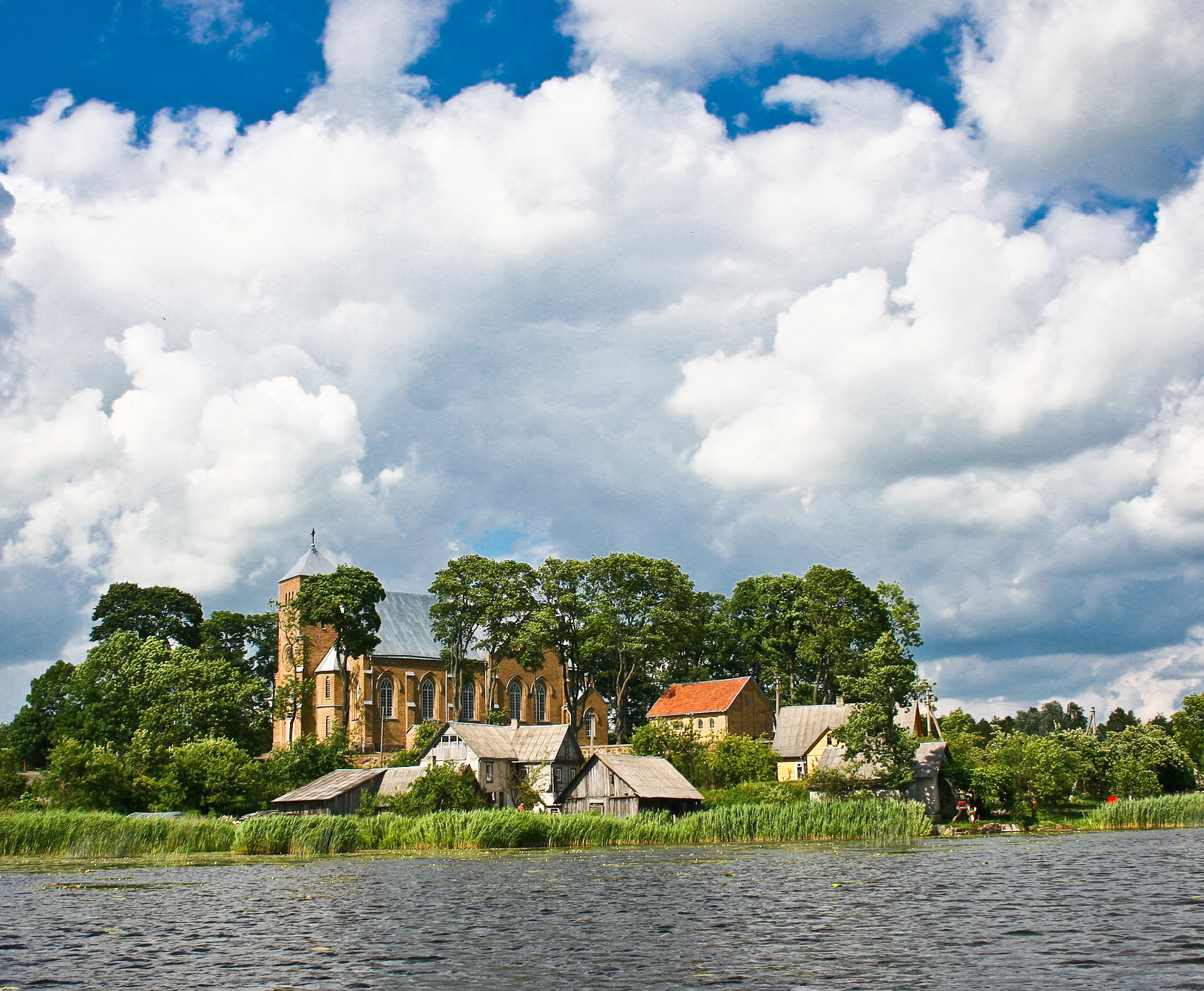

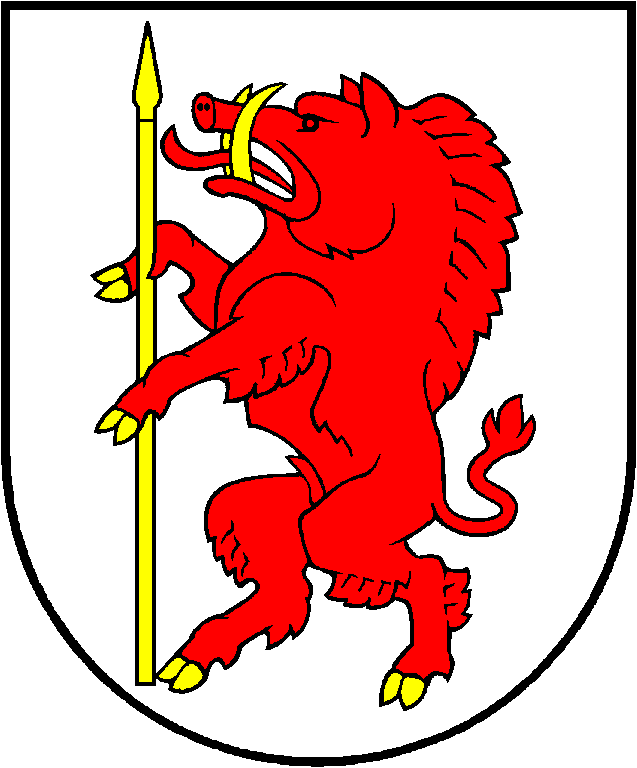
- Coat of arms

- Location within Lithuania
- Coordinates: 55°09′02″N 24°34′27″E
- Country: Lithuania
- Ethnographic region: Aukštaitija
- County: Vilnius County
- Municipality: Ukmergė district municipality
- Elderate: Vepriai elderate
- Capital of: Vepriai elderate
- First mentioned: 1384

Population (2011)
  - Total: 549
- Time zone: UTC+2 (EET)
  - Summer (DST): UTC+3 (EEST)

Vepriai (/ˈvæpreɪ/) is the largest town in Ukmergė district, Lithuania, situated south-west of Ukmergė with a population of about 549 (2011). It serves as the administrative capital of Vepriai elderate.

== History ==
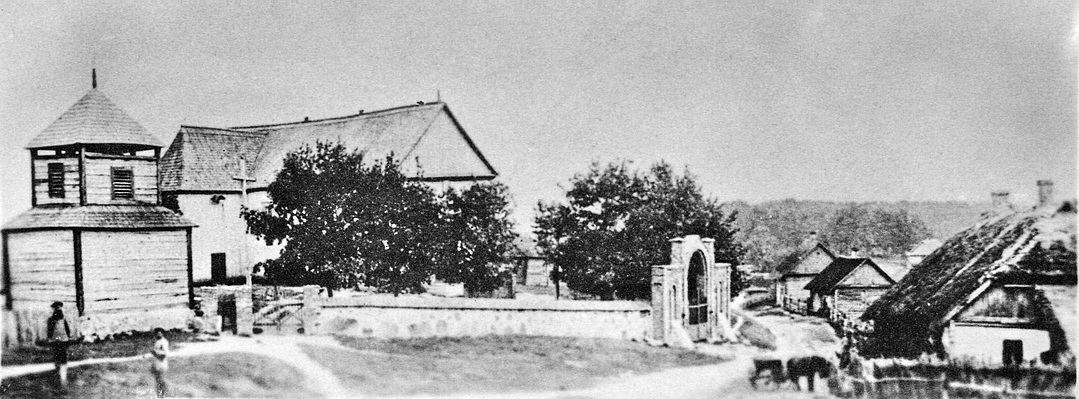
The town center with the church, circa 1900

Vepriai was founded on a hill near Vepriai Lake and south of Šventoji River. It is first mentioned in Wigand of Marburg's Chronicle of 1384 under the name of Weperen. In the Middle Ages Vepriai was a powerful hill fort which assisted in protection of Lithuanian lands from western threats, primarily the Teutonic Order. Wigand of Marburg asserted that the castle belonged to the Grand Duke of Lithuania. In spring of 1384, during the Lithuanian civil war of 1381–1384 the united forces of Grand Duke of Lithuania Vytautas, under command of Nartautas, and the Teutonic Order, attacked the castle which was under control of Jogaila or Skirgaila and captured it. After the threats were eliminated, in the place of the destroyed wooden defensive castle on a piliakalnis a residential manor was built, ruled by various noble families for several centuries.

At the time of the first mention in 1542, the castle's owners were the Kęsgailos Lithuanian ducal family. At the turn of the 17th century the Renaissance residential palace of the Šemetos (singular: Šemeta) noble family was built. Then it passed to the Ogiński family. The place owned by Aleksander Ogiński became a dowry of his daughter Barbara Szemiott née Ogińska in the 17th century and thus passed to the Szemiott (Polonized form of "Šemeta") family but was taken back by Barbara's nephew Marcjan Aleksander Ogiński in 1681. Later it passed to the Tyzenhauz family (again as a dowry) and eventually became disputed between it and the Kossakowski family until 1779. In 1808 Count Ignacy Tyzenhauz sold it to Count Jozef Dominik Kossakowski. Following his death in 1840 the place was inherited by Kossakowski's daughter Pelagia, married to a Scottish esquire, former servant in the Indian Navy, Alexander Bower St. Clair, father of an infamous rebel leader Stanislas Saint Clair, born in the manor palace. In 1855 the place was sequestrated by the imperial authorities and was sold to Ksawery Podbereski and his wife Anna née Roemer, who later sold it to Count Adam Alfred Plater. The Plater family owned the palace and the surrounding lands until 1923, when the area was nationalized by the Lithuanian state.

The 17th century Renaissance palace on the Vepriai Mound was devastated by Swedish troops during the Great Northern War and has been demolished later on. The other place closer to the lake has been selected for the new palace. The present Neoclassical palace was erected in the 19th century and is dominant in the manor ensemble. Countess Emilia Plater with her army has stayed in the manor during the November Uprising. The manor was nationalized in 1923 and has been used to house the newly established Vepriai Agricultural School since 1924.

Vepriai became the center of the new parish in 1845 and was the capital of Vepriai Volost from 1864 until 1950.

== Geography ==
The town is situated near the center of Vepriai Meteor Crater, the largest of craters found in Lithuania.

Vepriai is located in Aukštaitija Region, in the Middle Lithuanian Lowlands, 4 km south of a major highway connecting Ukmergė, Jonava and Kaunas cities. It is situated 11 km southwest of Deltuva and 10,5 km northeast of Upninkai.

The third biggest river in Lithuania Šventoji flows just south of the town. Forests, hills and river valleys are inherent to the landscape of Vepriai and its vicinity. The picturesque Vepriai Lake, situated 67 meters above mean sea level, serves for fishing and various leisure activities of locals and arrivals. Due to its convenient placement, beautiful nature and rich heritage Vepriai is one of the most attractive tourism sites in Ukmergė District.

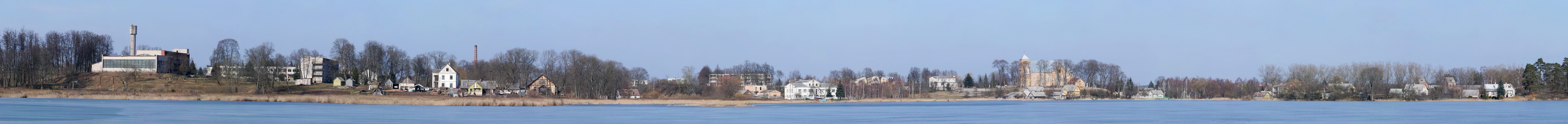
Panoramic view of the town from the Vepriai Lake. The manor is on the left side and the church is right of the middle of the image

== Structures ==
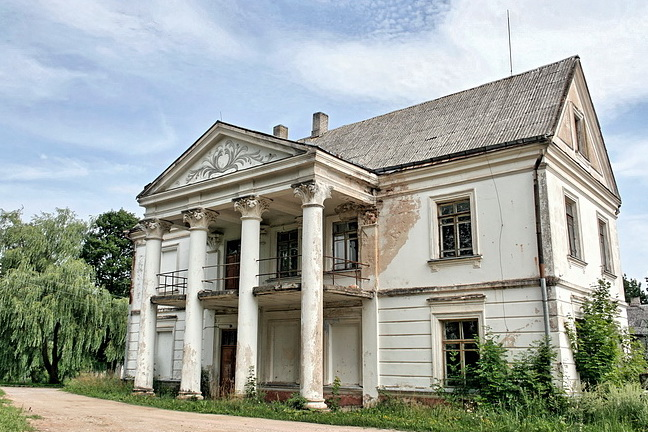
Desolate Vepriai manor palace

The derelict western pavilion of the Vepriai manor palace (19th century), decorated with a portico with 4 columns of a simplified Corinthian order and painted in white, with the outhouse and remains of a park with ponds and a 130 m length linden alley has survived until the present days.

The neo-Gothic Vepriai Roman Catholic Church of The Holy Virgin Mary the Queen of the Rosary was built in 1910 in the place of an old wooden church. Construction of the church, designed by Władysław Stipulkowski, was funded by the Count Marian Broel - Plater and local farmers. The church suffered a belfry's blow-up by Wehrmacht on 26 July 1944; its restoration to the original appearance is pending.

The oldest remaining structure in the town is a Baroque roadside chapel built after 1772 in commemoration of the Bar Confederation. The chapel has one segment remaining which contains a large wooden figure of crucifix. It is the only surviving piece of the masonry Baroque architecture in Ukmergė district.

The largest construction took place in Vepriai center during the final decades of the Soviet rule. In the place of the old rectory and several other wooden buildings the modern public services' building was erected. Today it houses a shop, a bar and a motel. In the site of a demolished water mill a new dam was constructed in the 1990s with the replica of the original water wheel, finished in 2000. The Young Pioneer camp with 240 places used to be in the southern Vepriai since 1962, which was abandoned in the 1990s and reconstructed to the children summer camp in 2004.

Calvaries' procession in Vepriai

== Culture ==
In the outskirts of the town the Way of the Cross according to the Catholic tradition was created in 1846. Wooden chapels were replaced by masonry chapels (aediculas) from 1882 until 1900, only the chapel of the Last Supper and the chapel of St. Veronica's Service have remained unchanged. Despite its complete destruction in winter of 1962–1963, Vepriai Way of the Cross has remained popular and has been attended abundantly throughout the Soviet occupation. The Way stretches for 5,5 km and is marked by brick chapels, five wooden and one iron gates denoting Stations of the Cross, most of which were restored in 1989. Vepriai Calvary is one of the three remaining in Lithuania (together with Verkiai Calvary and Žemaičių Kalvarija) and is visited by local worshipers yearly in Whit Sunday.

Joninės celebration has a vivid tradition in Vepriai. The feast takes place in Vepriai pinewood, near the hippodrome. It starts with horse race, sports competitions, and performances of local folk music bands and ends with lighting of the bonfire and a nightlong youth discotheque.

== Image gallery ==
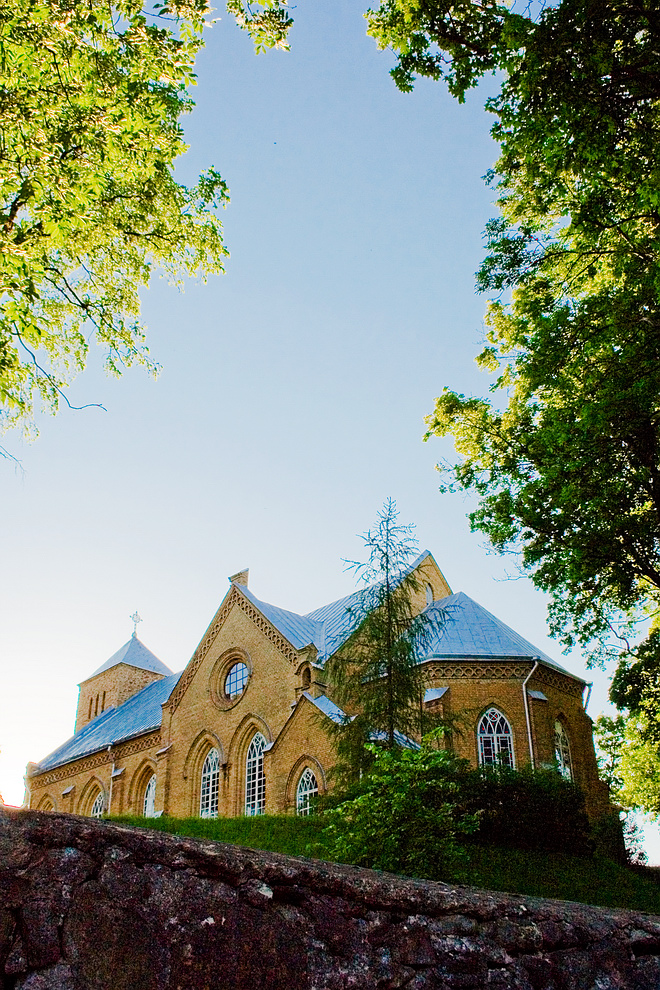
Vepriai church from the south-east

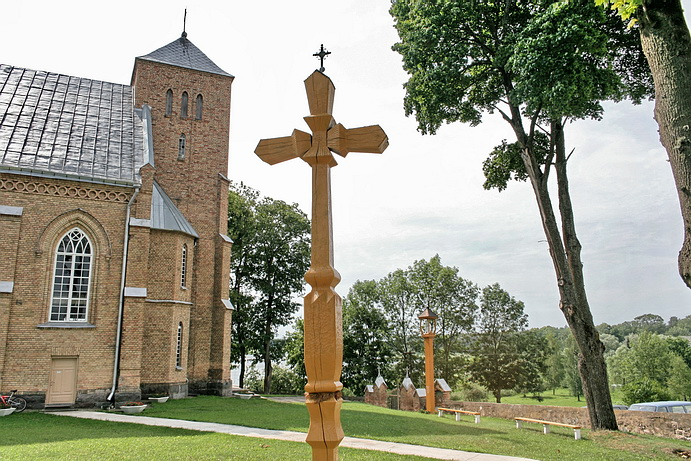
Churchyard

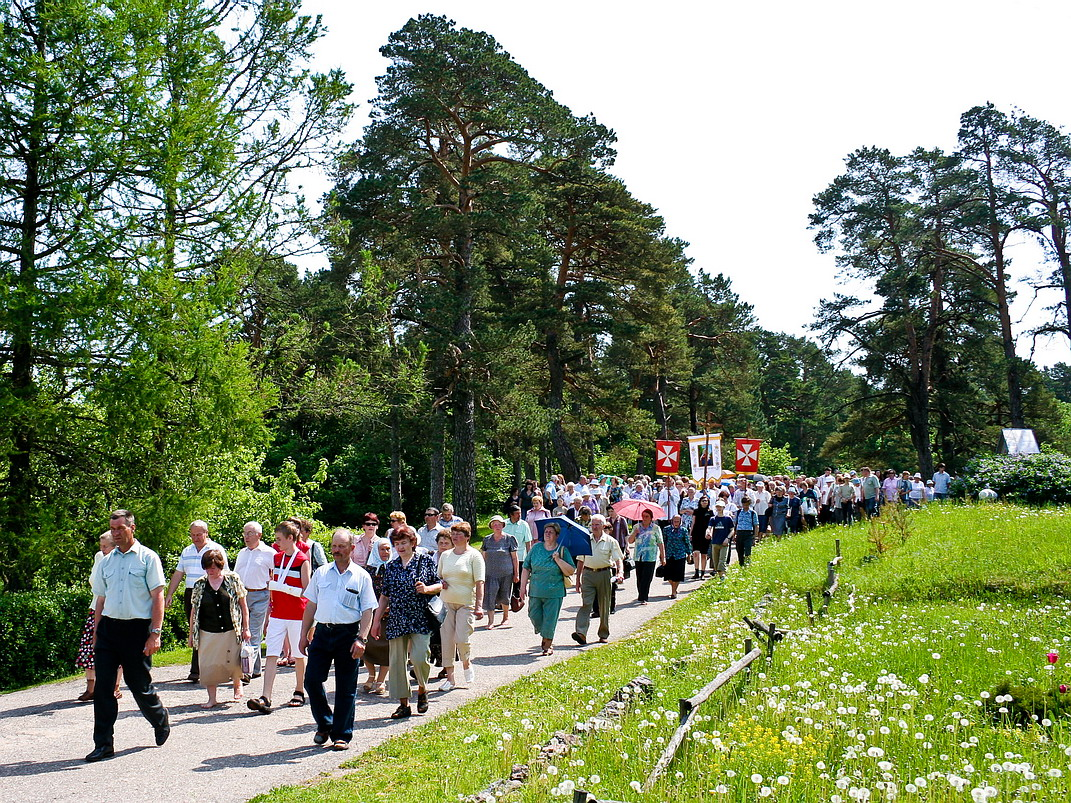
Festival of Pentecost

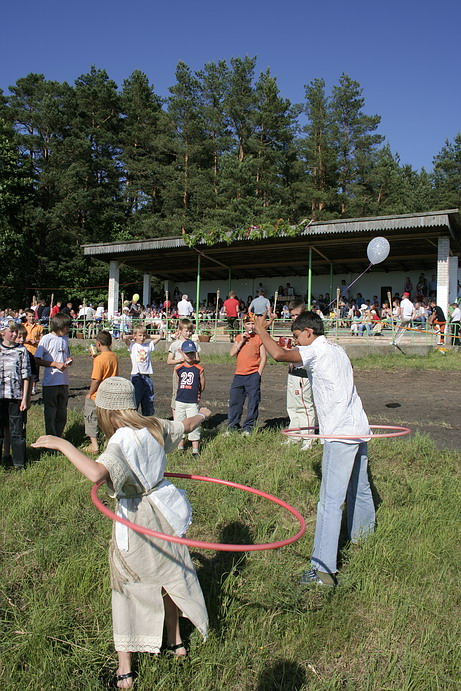
Joninės feast

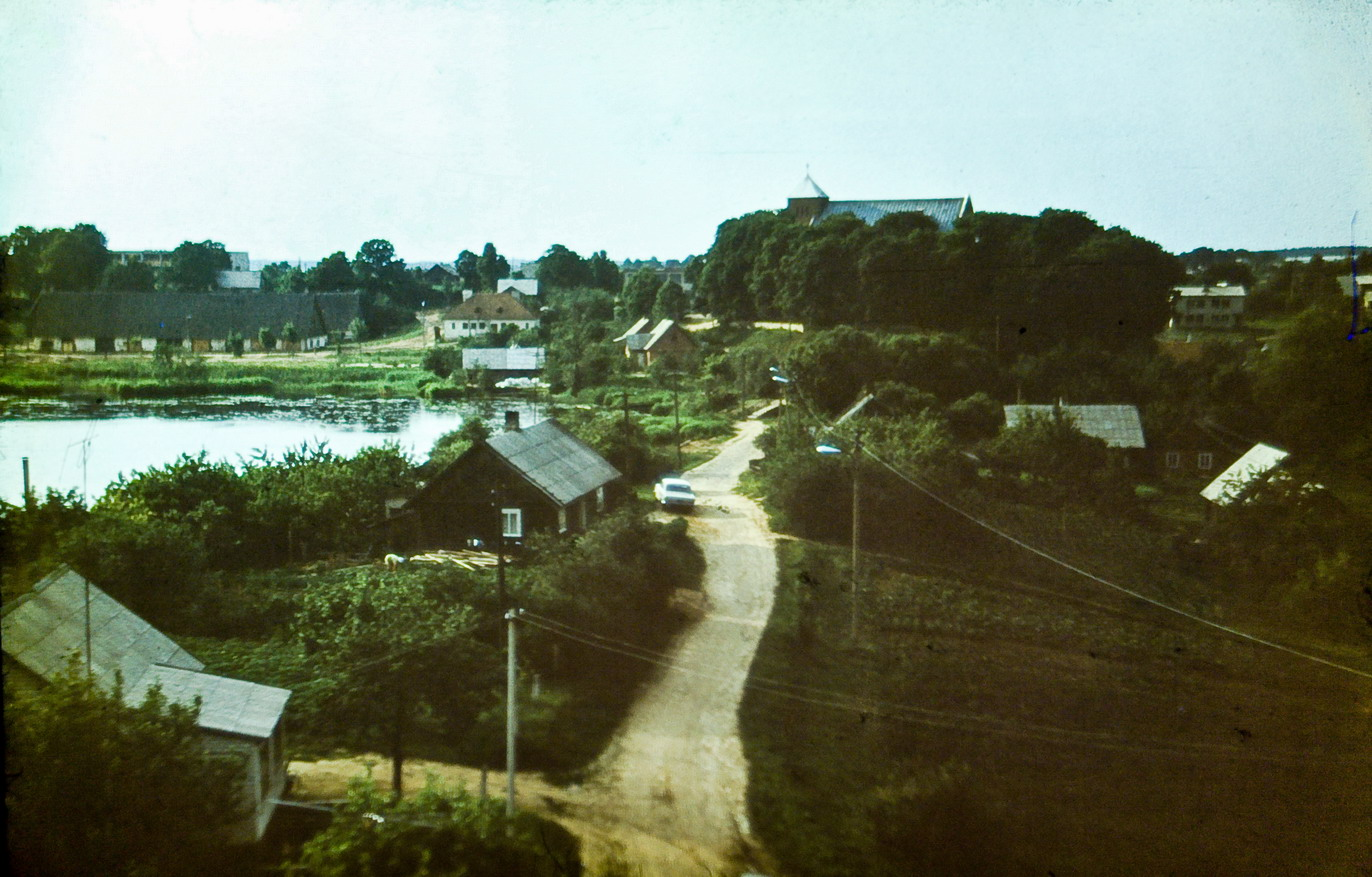
View of Vepriai in the 70s

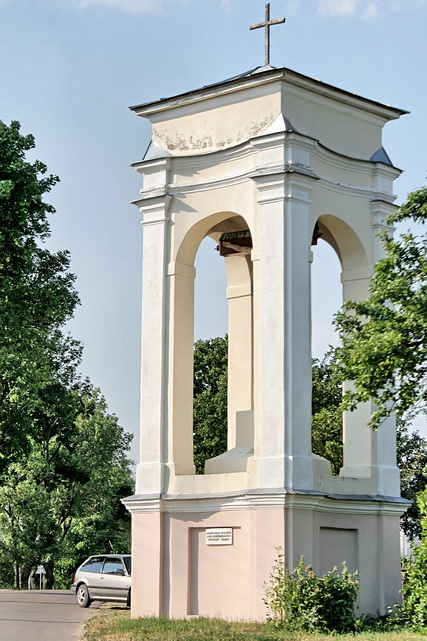
Bar Confederation wayside chapel

One of the monuments in Vepriai

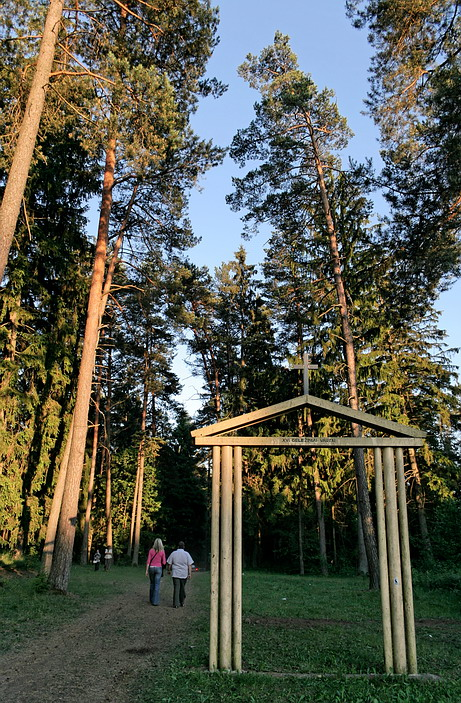
Iron gates in Vepriai Way of the Cross
