= Miroslavas Eldership =

Eldership of Lithuania

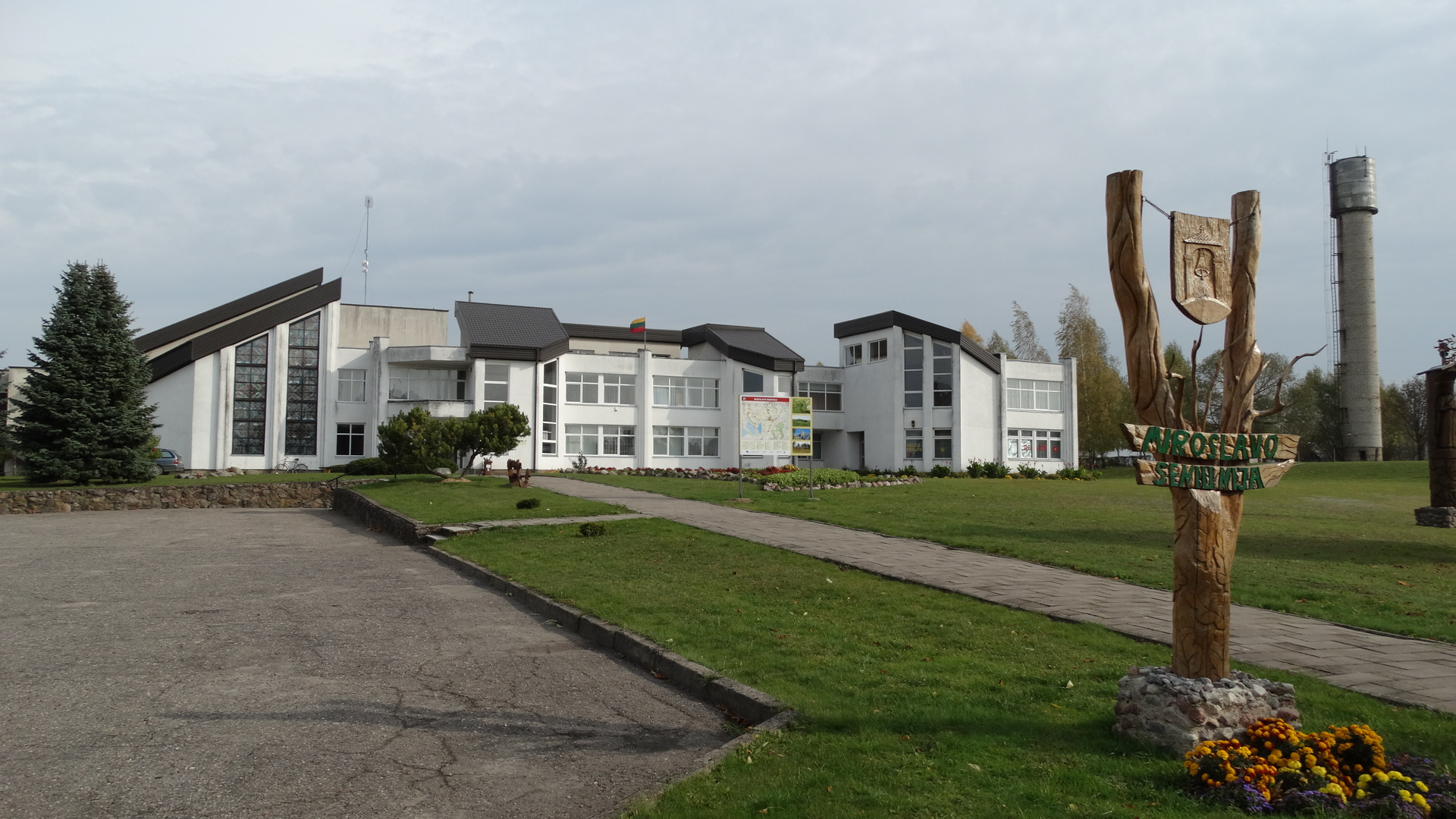

The Miroslavas Eldership (Lithuanian: Miroslavo seniūnija) is an eldership of Lithuania, located in the Alytus District Municipality. In 2021 its population was 2798.
