= Želva =

- Town
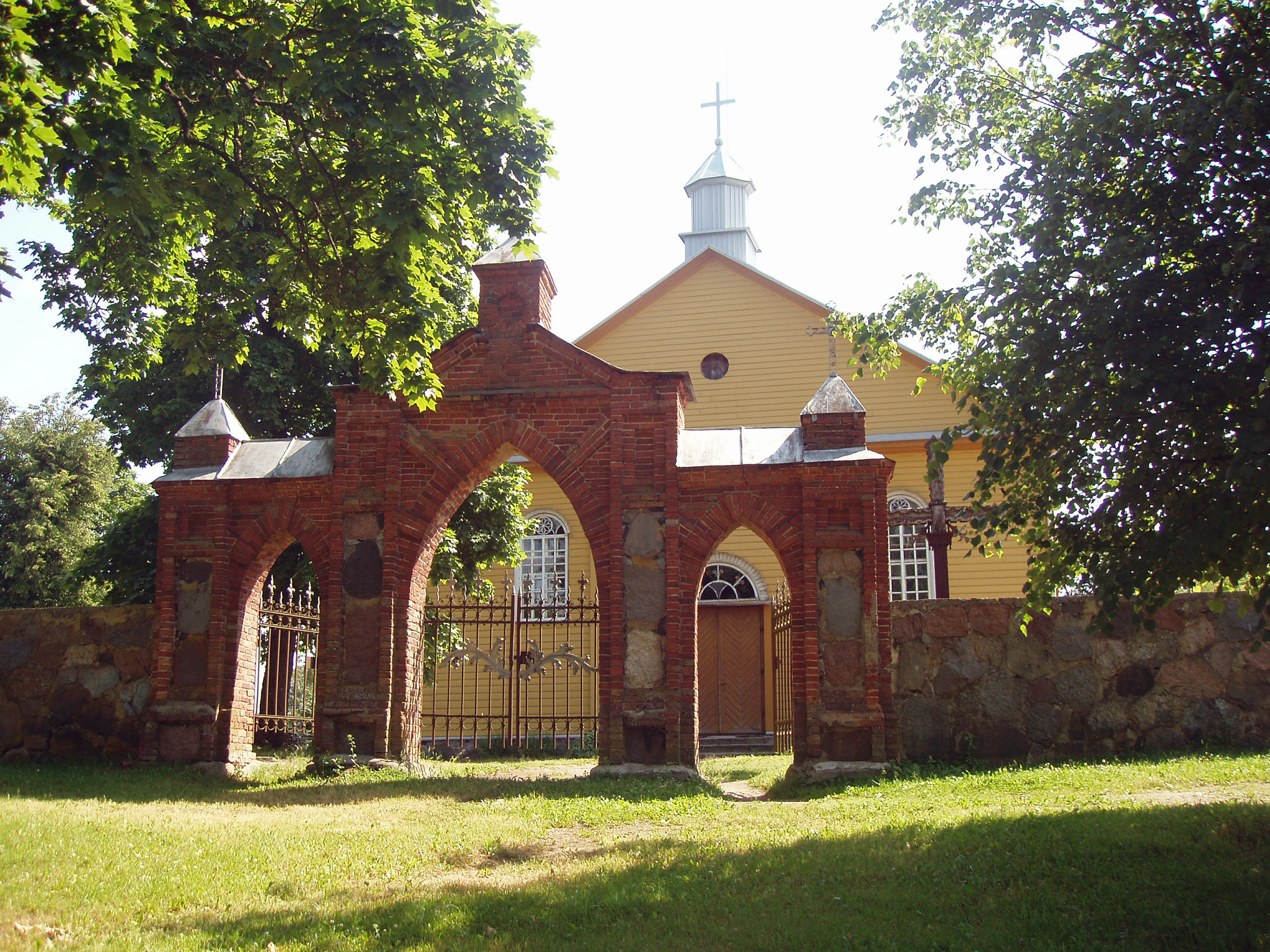

- Location in Lithuania
- Coordinates: 55°13′08″N 25°05′49″E
- Country: Lithuania
- County: Vilnius County
- Municipality: Ukmergė district municipality
- Eldership: Želva eldership

Population (2011)
  - Total: 457
- Time zone: UTC+2 (EET)
  - Summer (DST): UTC+3 (EEST)

Želva is a town in Ukmergė district municipality, Vilnius County, east Lithuania. Želva is 14 miles east of the city of Ukmergė. According to the Lithuanian census of 2011, the town has a population of 457 people. As a shtetl in the early 20th century, it was known as Pazelva (Hebrew: Podzelva). Its residents were Jewish and primarily spoke Yiddish.

== History ==
The town has a Catholic church and a synagogue. Želva is the birthplace of Nobel Prize in Chemistry winner Aaron Klug.

On July 26 and 27, 1941, the Jews of the town were murdered in a mass execution perpetrated by the Einsatzgruppen and local Lithuanian collaborators. 60 people were killed. Due to the Nazi extermination of Jews during World War II, residents of Pazelva who had not already emigrated were killed. Descendants of people who fled the village now live in countries such as the US, Puerto Rico and Israel.

The Nobel prizewinning biophysicist and chemist Aaron Klug (1926–2018) was born in Želva.
