= Vidiškiai =

- Town
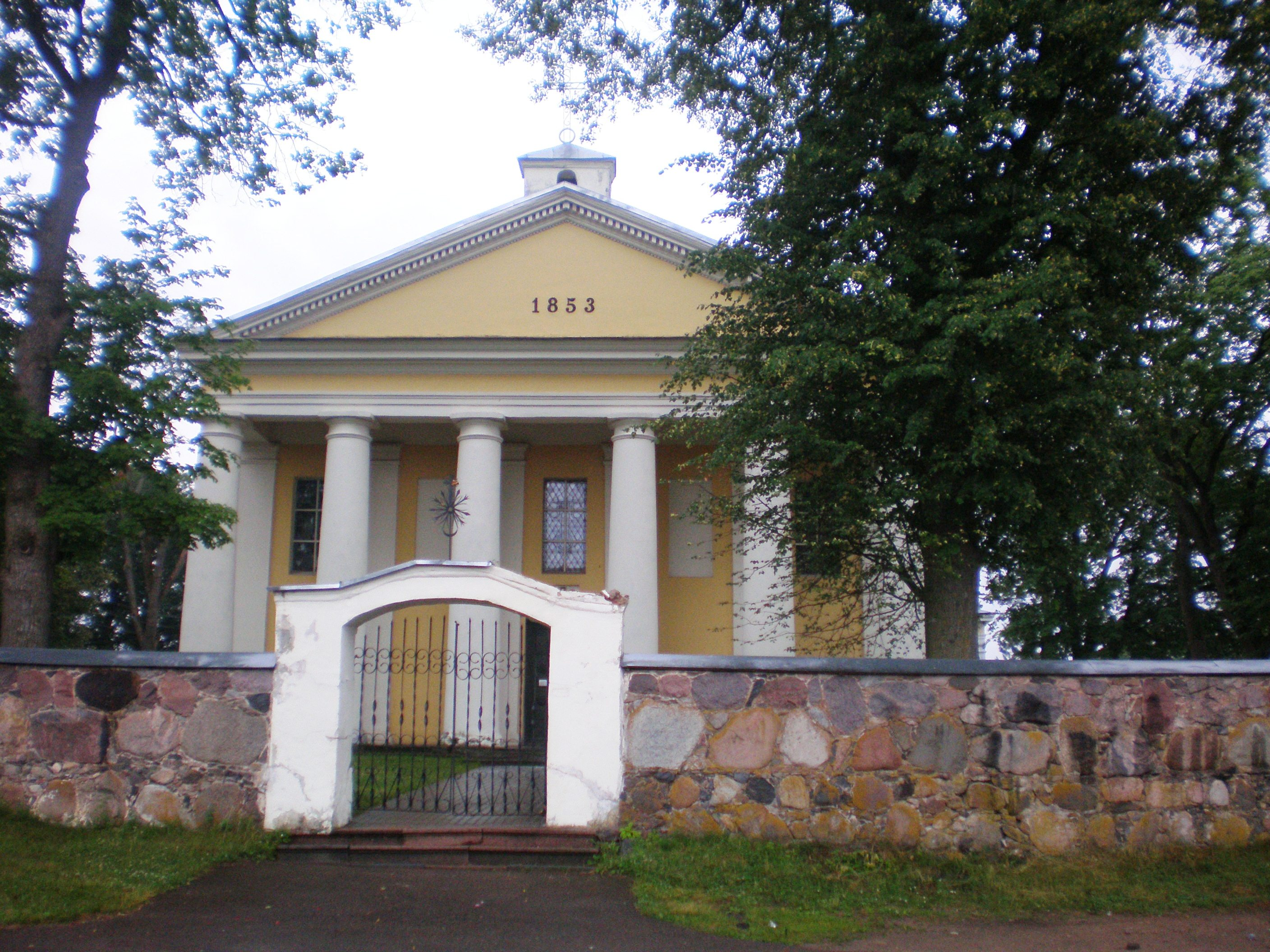

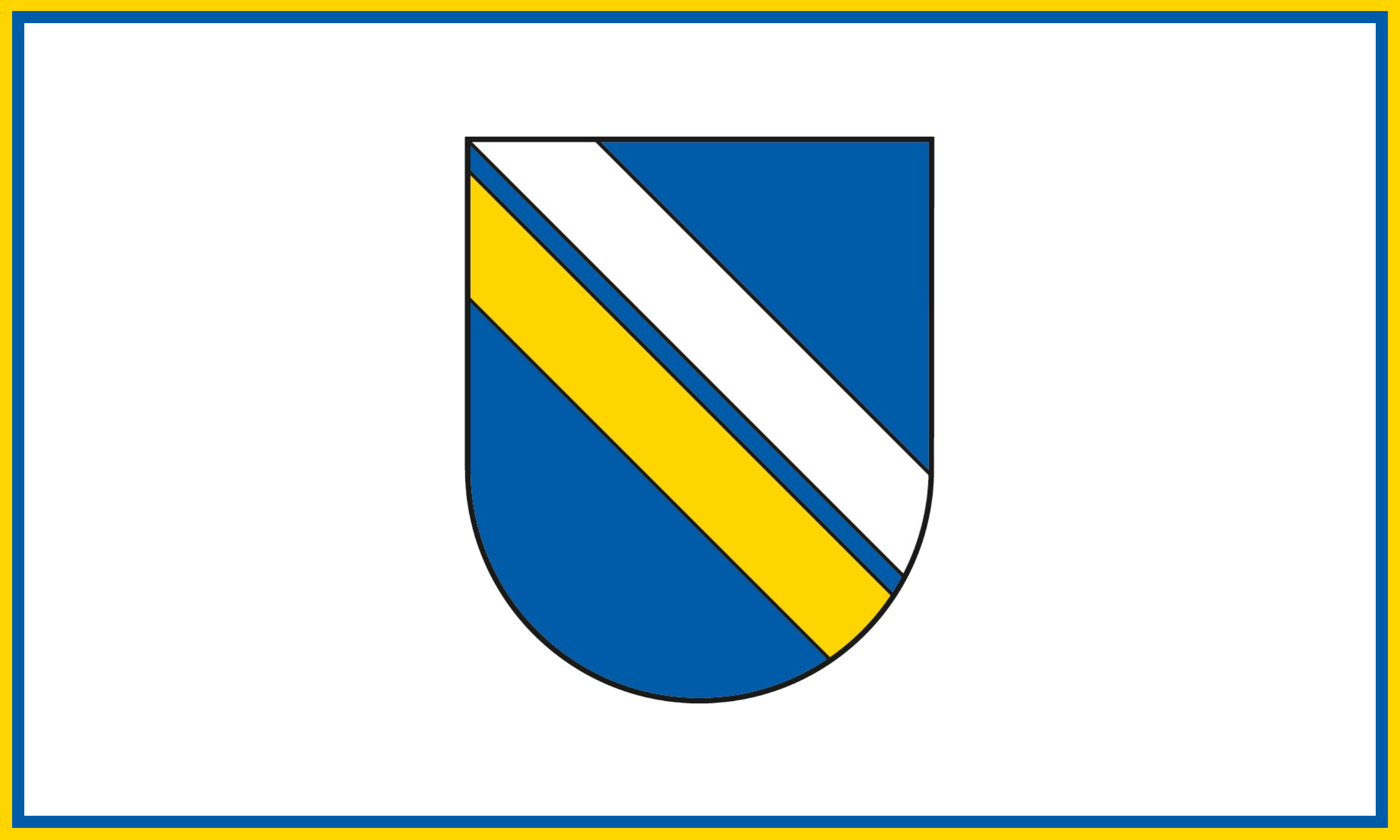
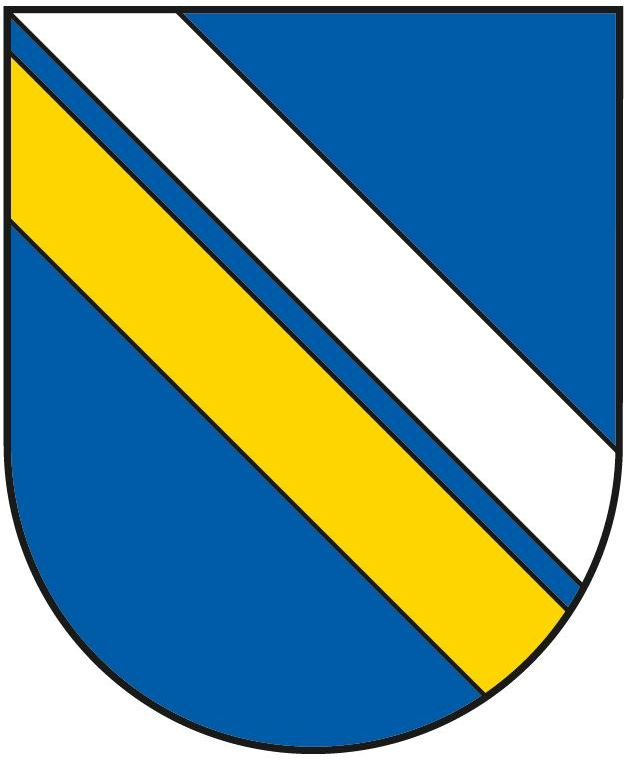
- Flag Coat of arms

- Location of Vidiškiai in Lithuania
- Coordinates: 55°18′29″N 24°51′50″E
- Country: Lithuania
- County: Vilnius County
- Municipality: Ukmergė district municipality
- Eldership: Vidiškiai eldership

Population (2011)
  - Total: 427
- Time zone: UTC+2 (EET)
  - Summer (DST): UTC+3 (EEST)

Vidiškiai is a town in Ukmergė district municipality, Vilnius County, in eastern Lithuania. According to the Lithuanian census of 2011, the town has a population of 427 people. The town has a Catholic church.
