= Vepriai crater =

Impact crater in Lithuania

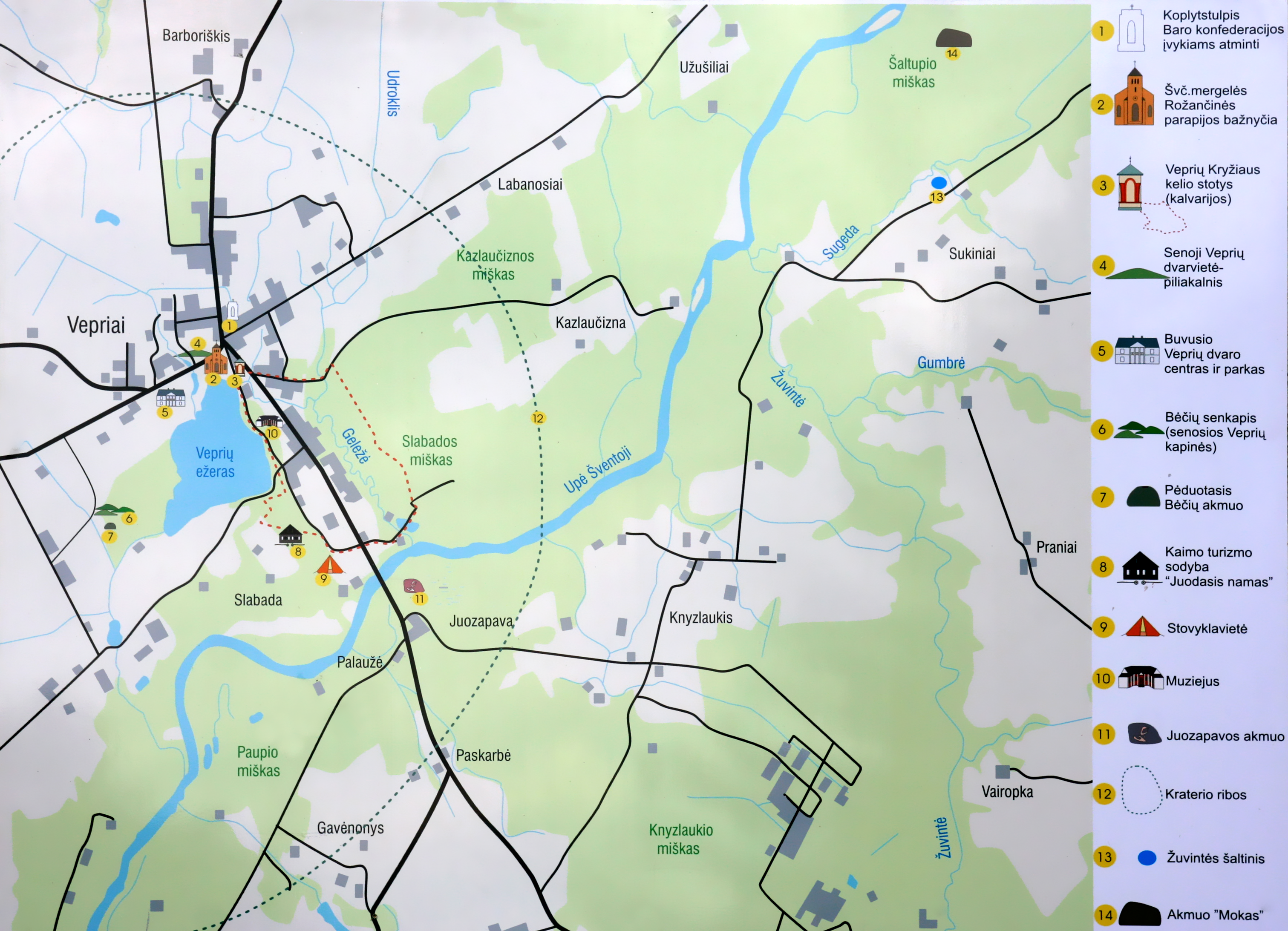
- Alleged boundaries of the crater are marked by a dotted line

- Location within Lithuania
- Location: Vepriai, Lithuania; 55.14°N 24.59°E

Impact crater structure
- Confidence: Confirmed
- Diameter: 8 km (5.0 mi)
- Age: 160 ± 10 Ma; Mid or Late Jurassic
- Exposed: No
- Drilled: Yes

Vepriai is the largest impact crater in Lithuania, named after the town of Vepriai located at its center. The crater is not exposed to the surface, having been eroded and covered by sedimentary rocks during the last glacial period.

Vepriai crater is 8 km (5.0 mi) in diameter and its age is estimated to be greater than 160 ± 10 million years (Middle or Late Jurassic). The meteorite struck soft sandstone and limestone rocks thus its initial depth exceeded 500 m (1,600 ft) but the site was soon covered by sedimentary rocks, sand and clay. A small lake has formed in the Jurassic in the impact site.

The crater was reported in 1978, as proven by occurrence of shatter cones and impact glass in drill-core samples acquired during a geophysical research of the locality.
