= Siesikai =

- Town
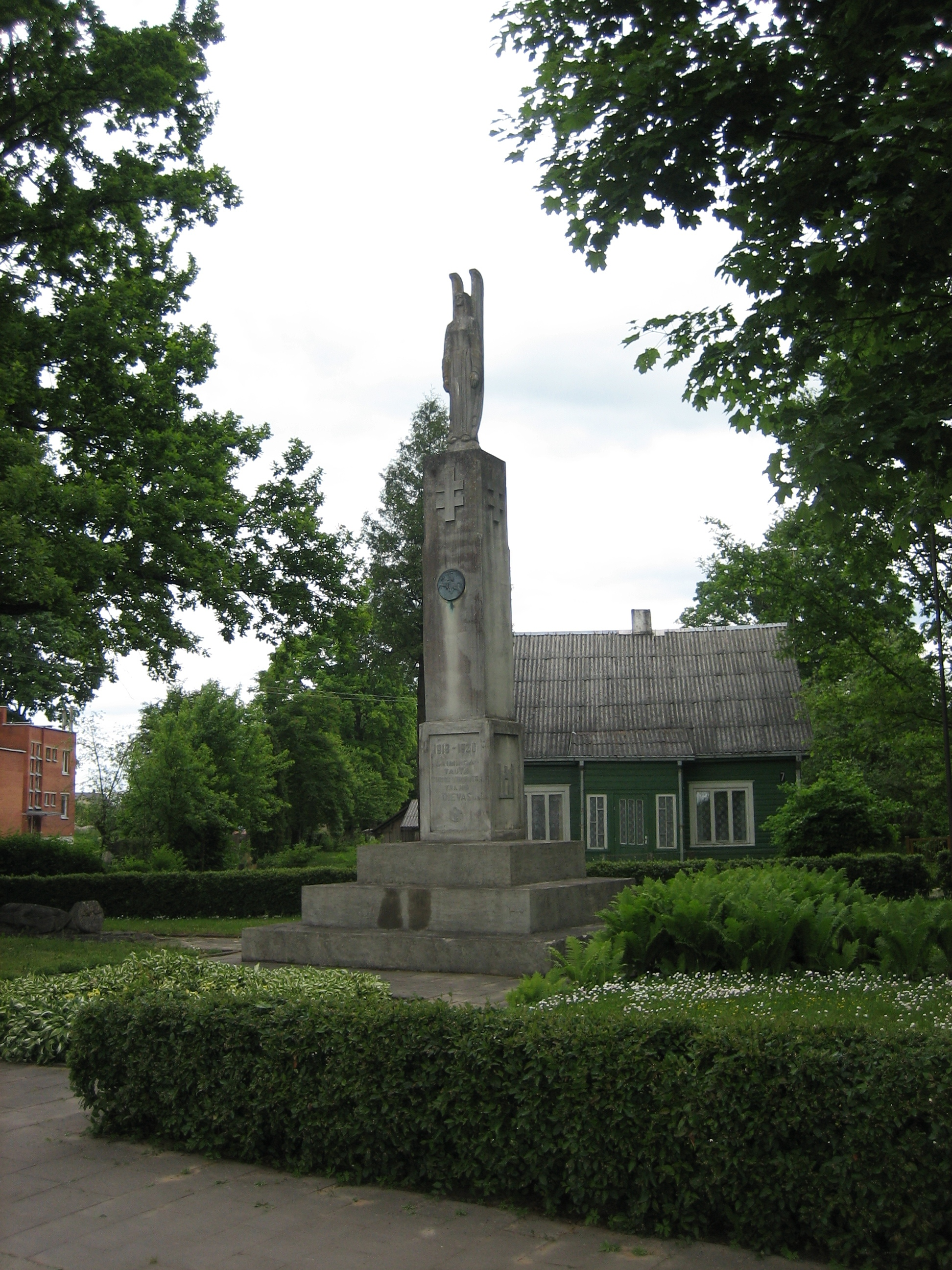

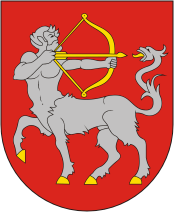
- Coat of arms

- Location of Siesikai in Lithuania
- Coordinates: 55°17′38″N 24°30′11″E
- Country: Lithuania
- County: Vilnius County
- Municipality: Ukmergė district municipality
- Eldership: Siesikai eldership

Population (2011)
  - Total: 508
- Time zone: UTC+2 (EET)
  - Summer (DST): UTC+3 (EEST)

Siesikai is a town in Ukmergė district municipality, Vilnius County, east Lithuania. According to the 2011 census, the town has a population of 508 people. The town has a Catholic church.

Alternative names include Sesikay, Sesiki, Sessiki, Siesiki (Polish), Siesikų, Sesik or Sheshik (Yiddish), and Siyesikay.
