= Viduklė =

- Town
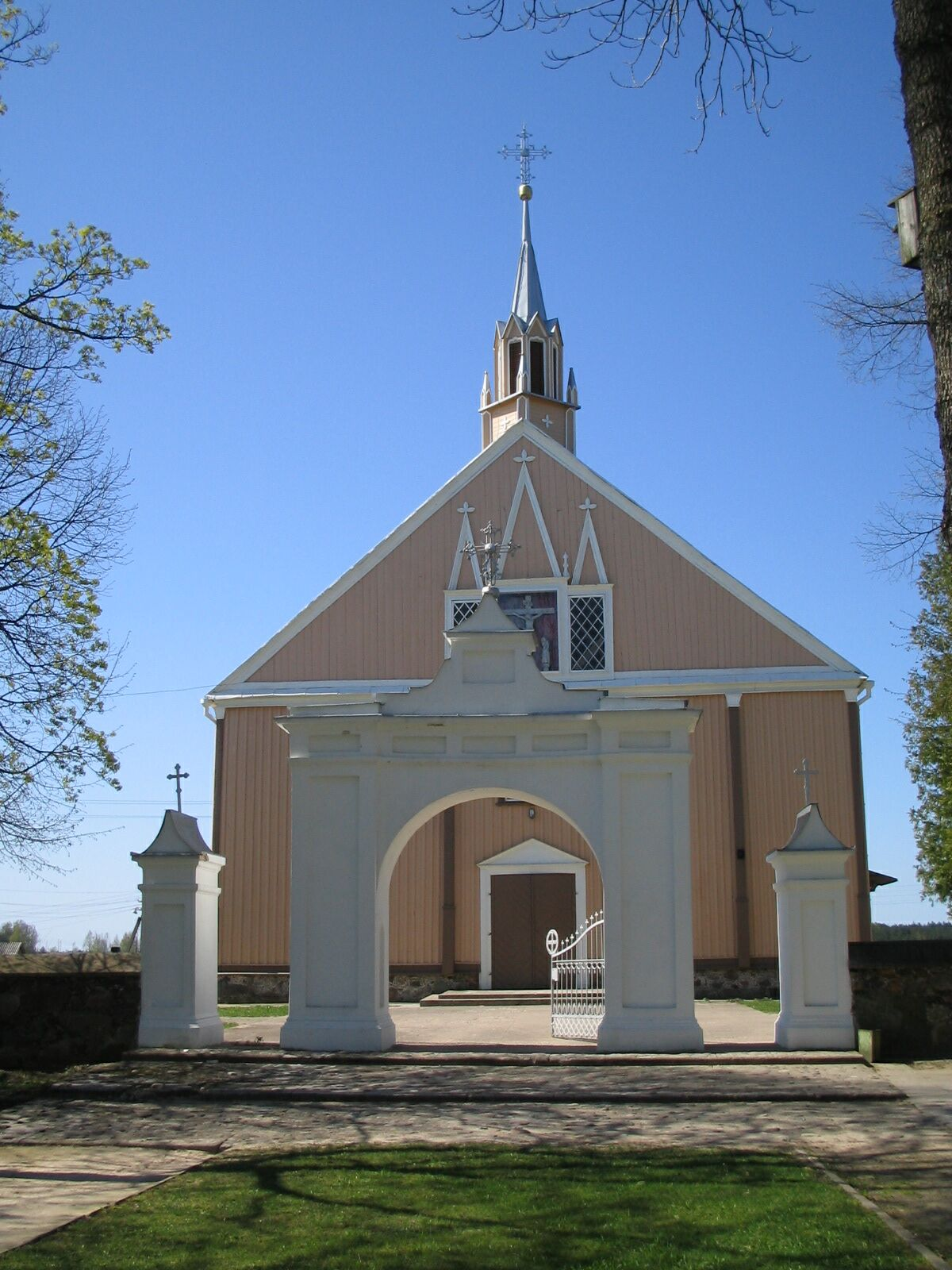

- Coat of arms

- Location in Lithuania
- Coordinates: 55°24′10″N 22°53′50″E
- Country: Lithuania
- Ethnographic region: Samogitia
- County: Kaunas County

Population (2021)
  - Total: 1,425
- Time zone: UTC+02:00 (EET)
  - Summer (DST): UTC+03:00 (EEST)

Viduklė (Samogitian: Vėdoklė) is a small town in a Raseiniai district municipality, Kaunas County, central-western Lithuania. In 2011, it had a population of 1,678.

== History ==
221 Jews lived in the town according to the 1923 census. The German army entered the town on June 23, 1941, and set up a ghetto to imprison the Jewish population. Starting on July 24, 1941, hundred of Jews living in the city were shot by Germans and Lithuanians collaborators.
