= Ukmergė District Municipality =

Coordinates: 55°16′05″N 24°45′54″E

Ukmergė District Municipality Ukmergės rajono savivaldybė
- Municipality
- Flag Coat of arms Brandmark

- Location of Ukmergė district municipality

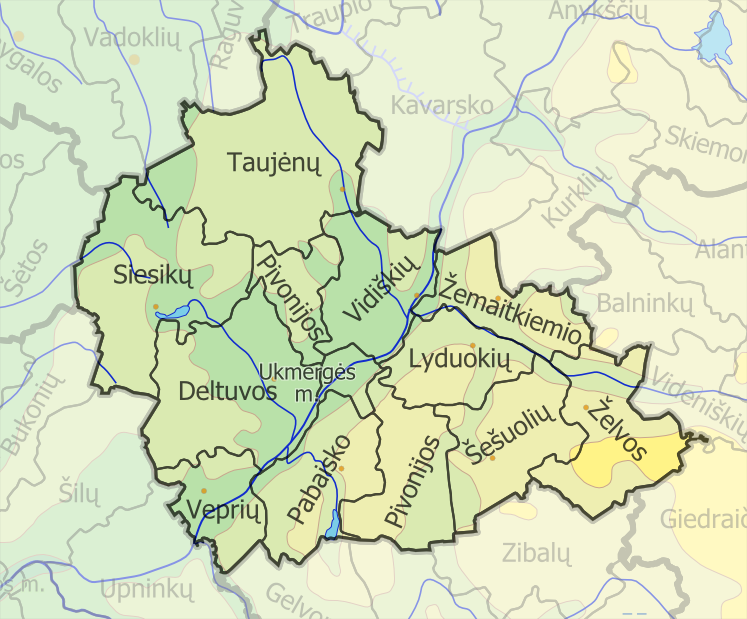
- Map of municipality
- Country: Lithuania
- Ethnographic region: Aukštaitija
- County: Vilnius County
- Capital: Ukmergė
- Elderships: List: Deltuva; Lyduokiai; Pabaiskas; Pivonija; Siesikai; Liaušiai; Taujėnai; Ukmergė; Vepriai; Vidiškiai; Želva; Žemaitkiemis

Area
  - Total: 1,395 km^{2} (539 sq mi)

Population (2021)
  - Total: 34,553
  - Density: 24.77/km^{2} (64.15/sq mi)
- Time zone: UTC+2 (EET)
  - Summer (DST): UTC+3 (EEST)
- Major settlements: Ukmergė (pop. 20,154)
- Website: www.ukmerge.lt

The Ukmergė District Municipality is a municipality in Vilnius County, Lithuania. The capital of the municipality is Ukmergė, the largest settlement and only city in the municipality. The entire municipality belongs to the Aukštaitija ethnographic region.

== Settlements ==
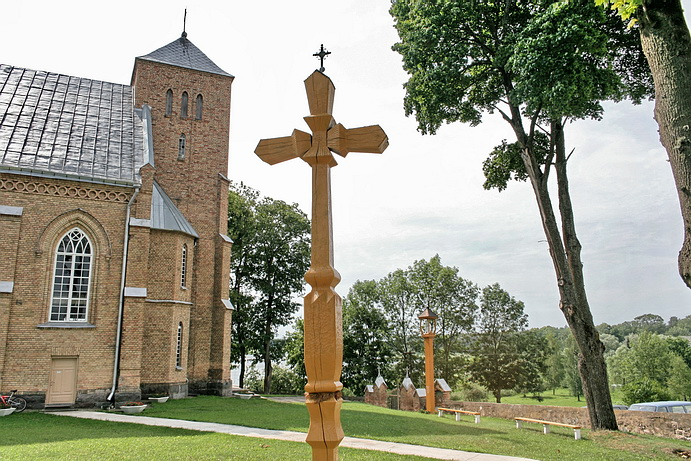
Vepriai churchyard

There are 10 towns in Ukmergė municipality: Deltuva, Lyduokiai, Pabaiskas, Siesikai, Šešuoliai, Taujėnai, Vepriai, Vidiškiai, Želva and Žemaitkiemis. Ukmergė municipality shares the second place in Lithuania (with Radviliškis District Municipality) according to the number of towns. There are 612 villages in the municipality, of which 234 are full parishes.

Vepriai is the most populous town in the municipality and is a local tourism (notably rural tourism) center. Siesikai is best known for the 16th century Renaissance Siesikai (Daumantai) Castle near Siesikai Lake. Deltuva has been the centre of the important Deltuva Land at the emergence of the centralised Lithuanian State. The ruins of one of the first Calvinist churches in Lithuania (17th century, Renaissance style) are near Deltuva. Pabaiskas was established near the location where the Battle of Wiłkomierz between the armies led by Žygimantas Kęstutaitis and Švitrigaila took place on 1 September 1435.

The first president of the independent Lithuanian state Antanas Smetona was born in Užulėnis, now in Ukmergė District.

== Geography ==
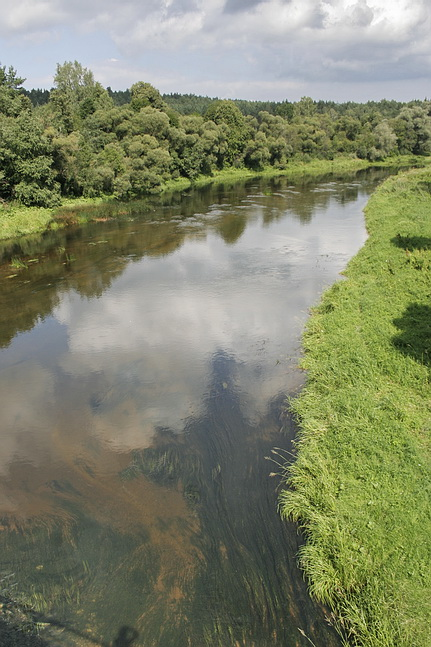
Šventoji River seen from the bridge

The eastern part of the municipality belongs to Aukštaitian Highlands and the western part is in the Nevėžis Plain.

Šventoji River is the largest river in the municipality and Širvinta River is the second. The other rivers are Siesartis, Mūša and Armona.

There are many Lakes in the Ukmergė District. Lake Lėnas is the largest lake (2.65 km²) and Lake Žirnajai the deepest (average depth of 9.8 meters).

Woodlands cover about 29 percent of the district, swamps occupy 2.3 percent and 54.5 percent is arable land.

== See also ==
- List of municipalities in Lithuania
- Subdivisions of Lithuania
- Counties of Lithuania
