= For Crying Out Loud (album) =

Studio album by Kasabian
- Released: 5 May 2017
- Recorded: 2016–2017
- Studios: The Sergery, Leicester; RAK Studios, London; The Strongroom, London
- Genres: Electronic rock; electronica; neo-psychedelia; space rock
- Length: 51:03
- Labels: Columbia; Sony
- Producer: Sergio Pizzorno

Kasabian chronology
48:13 (2014)	For Crying Out Loud (2017)	The Alchemist's Euphoria (2022)

Singles from For Crying Out Loud
- 1. "You're in Love with a Psycho" Released: 17 March 2017; 2. "Are You Looking for Action?" Released: 21 April 2017; 3. "Ill Ray (The King)" Released: 2 May 2017; 4. "Bless This Acid House" Released: 4 May 2017; 5. "Comeback Kid" Released: 5 May 2017

For Crying Out Loud is the sixth studio album by English rock band Kasabian. It was released worldwide on 5 May 2017. It is their last album to feature lead vocalist Tom Meighan before his departure from the band in 2020.

== Background ==
The single "Comeback Kid" was originally released for the FIFA 17 soundtrack, though it was leaked online to YouTube six days before the North American release of the game. The leak was promptly taken down.

== Packaging ==
The album's cover, designed by Aitor Throup, consists of a monochrome photograph of the band's longtime roadie Rick Graham's naked bust with digitally animated tears emanating from his eyes. A white background surrounds the photograph with the band's name above it and the album's title in quotation marks below with the year in parentheses after the title. Throup worked in collaboration with photographer Neil Bedford and visual designer Daft Apeth to create the artwork. "I really wanted to challenge how I previously approached art direction, through the deconstruction of the graphic design tools and their known formulas – which I have used in previous works with Kasabian", Throup told It's Nice That. "I'm really embracing the basics of default composition, whilst creating my own default design process through doing so. I even wanted to embrace and explore the beauty of default fonts."

== Release ==
The album was originally scheduled to be released on 28 April 2017 but was pushed back a week to 5 May 2017. It is also the band's first album to be released on a single 12" vinyl LP rather than 2x10" LPs.

== Critical reception ==
Professional ratings
Aggregate scores
Source	Rating
Metacritic	70/100
Review scores
Source	Rating
Clash	4/10
The Guardian	3/5 stars
The Independent	4/5 stars
NME	4/5 stars

For Crying Out Loud received generally favourable reviews from music critics. At Metacritic, which assigns a normalized rating out of 100 to reviews from mainstream critics, the album received an average score of 70, based on 14 reviews.

NME praised the album's overall delivery, stating that "For Crying Out Loud is chockablock with massive tunes that make an instant impact."

Despite the generally positive reviews, some reviewers were less favourable. Clash magazine gave the album a score of 4/10, describing it as "A mixed return that ultimately feels like a failure."

The Quietus, meanwhile, gave a negative review, noting: "Say what you like about Kasabian but never have they been this pedestrian, predictable, and so utterly, utterly bland."

=== Accolades ===
Publication	Accolade	Year	Rank	Ref.
NME	NME's Albums of the Year	2017	33	

== Commercial performance ==
For Crying Out Loud topped the UK Albums Chart with 52,000 combined units in its first week of release, giving Kasabian their fifth consecutive number-one album. It also ended Ed Sheeran's nine-week run on the top spot with ÷, beating it out by 5,000 copies. The album was certified silver by the BPI on 19 May 2017.

== Track listing ==
All tracks are written by Sergio Pizzorno.

No.	Title	Length
1.	"Ill Ray (The King)"	3:39
2.	"You're in Love with a Psycho"	3:35
3.	"Twentyfourseven"	3:01
4.	"Good Fight"	3:50
5.	"Wasted"	4:07
6.	"Comeback Kid"	4:19
7.	"The Party Never Ends"	3:52
8.	"Are You Looking for Action?"	8:22
9.	"All Through the Night"	3:31
10.	"Sixteen Blocks"	4:19
11.	"Bless This Acid House"	3:44
12.	"Put Your Life on It"	4:35
Total length:		51:03

Deluxe Edition: "Underdog" (2016) Live at King Power Stadium
No.	Title	Length
1.	"Underdog"	6:09
2.	"Bumblebeee"	4:33
3.	"Shoot the Runner"	3:50
4.	"Eez-eh"	3:49
5.	"Fast Fuse"	4:19
6.	"Days Are Forgotten"	4:56
7.	"I.D."	5:56
8.	"British Legion"	3:24
9.	"The Doberman/Take Aim"	6:56
10.	"Put Your Life on It"	4:39
11.	"Stuntman"	5:48
12.	"L.S.F. (Lost Souls Forever)"	7:04
13.	"Stevie"	6:09
14.	"Vlad the Impaler"	5:57
15.	"Fire"	4:30

== Personnel ==
Kasabian

- Tom Meighan – lead vocals (except "Are You Looking For Action?" and "All Through The Night"), backing vocals on "Are You Looking For Action?"
- Sergio Pizzorno – guitars, bass guitar, synthesizers, piano, drum programming, production, mixing, backing vocals, lead vocals ("Are You Looking For Action?" and "All Through The Night"), co-lead vocals on "You're In Love With A Psycho"
- Chris Edwards – bass guitar, backing vocals
- Ian Matthews – drums, percussion

Additional musicians

- Tim Carter – guitar, organ, additional programming, production
- Ben Kealey – piano on "Ill Ray (The King)" and "Wasted", organ on "All Through the Night", backing vocals (1, 4, 5, 6, 8, 10, 11)
- Gary Alesbrook – trumpet on "Comeback Kid"
- Trevor Mires – trombone on "Comeback Kid"
- Andrew Kinsman – saxophone on "Are You Looking for Action?"
- Fay Lovsky – backing vocals on "The Party Never Ends" and "Are You Looking for Action?", saw on "All Through the Night"
- Dirty Pretty Strings – strings on "The Party Never Ends"
- Ennio Pizzorno – synthesizers on "Sixteen Blocks"
- Lucio Pizzorno – synthesizers on "Sixteen Blocks"

Production and design

- Stephen McLaughlin – engineering, mixing
- Steph Marziano – engineering
- Marli Wren – mixing assistant
- Mark "Spike" Stent – mixing on "You're in Love with a Psycho"
- Michael Freeman- mixing assistant on "You're in Love with a Psycho"
- Rich Costey – mixing on "Twentyfourseven" and "All Through the Night"
- Martin Cooke – mixing assistant on "Twentyfourseven" and "All Through the Night"
- Nicolas Fournier – mixing assistant on "Twentyfourseven" and "All Through the Night"
- Craig Silvey- mixing on "Good Fight"
- Max Prior – mixing assistant "Good Fight"
- Mike Marsh – mastering
- John Coyne – management
- Simon Moran – management
- Aitor Throup – design and art direction
- Daft Apeth – artwork
- Neil Bedford – photography
- David Marques – graphic design

== Charts ==
=== Weekly charts ===
Chart (2017–2020)	Peak position
Australian Albums (ARIA)	21
Austrian Albums (Ö3 Austria)	20
Belgian Albums (Ultratop Flanders)	22
Belgian Albums (Ultratop Wallonia)	14
Czech Albums (ČNS IFPI)	50
Dutch Albums (Album Top 100)	35
French Albums (SNEP)	60
German Albums (Offizielle Top 100)	27
Irish Albums (IRMA)	2
Italian Albums (FIMI)	7
New Zealand Heatseekers Albums (RMNZ)	2
Polish Albums (ZPAV)	15
Portuguese Albums (AFP)	29
Scottish Albums (Official Charts)	1
Spanish Albums (Promusicae)	70
Swiss Albums (Schweizer Hitparade)	12
UK Albums (Official Charts)	1

=== Year-end charts ===
Chart (2017)	Position
UK Albums (OCC)	40

== Certifications ==
Region	Certification	Certified units/sales
United Kingdom (BPI)	Gold	100,000^{‡}
^{‡} Sales+streaming figures based on certification alone.
