= List of awards and nominations received by Kasabian =

Kasabian awards and nominations
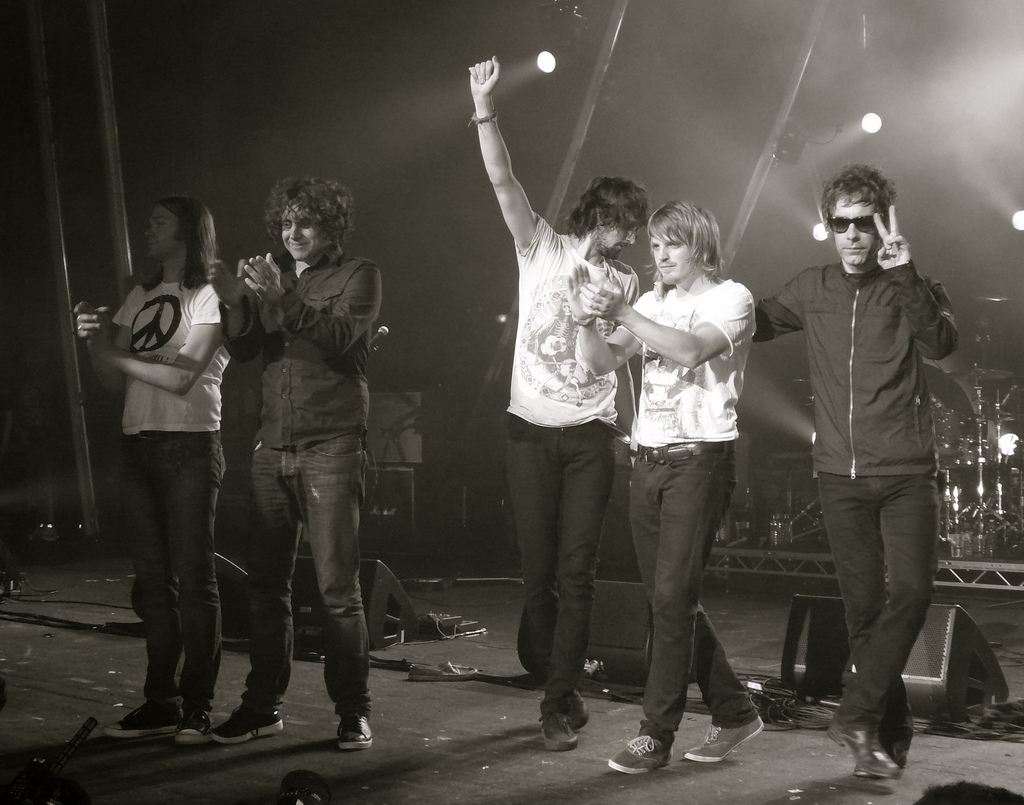
- Kasabian in 2009
Awards and nominations
Award	Wins	Nominations
Brit	1	9
Mojo	1	3
NME	7	16
Q	4	12

Totals (Note: Certain award groups do not simply award one winner. They acknowledge several different recipients, have runners-up, and have third place. Since this is a specific recognition and is different from losing an award, runner-up mentions are considered wins in this award tally. For simplification and to avoid errors, each award in this list has been presumed to have had a prior nomination.)
- Wins: 13
- Nominations: 40

Kasabian is an English alternative rock band formed in 1997 by Sergio Pizzorno (guitar), Tom Meighan (lead vocals), Chris Edwards (bass guitar) and Christopher Karloff (lead guitar). They were later joined by drummer Ian Matthews in 2004 and guitarist Jay Mehler replaced Karloff in 2006 as a live member. To date the band have released six studio albums: Kasabian (2004), Empire (2006), West Ryder Pauper Lunatic Asylum (2009), Velociraptor! (2011) 48:13 (2014) and For Crying Out Loud (2017).

The band have been nominated 39 times and have won 13 awards.

== Brit Awards ==
The Brit Awards is an annual awards ceremony established in 1977. To date, Kasabian has received one award.

Year	Nominee / work	Award	Result
2005	Kasabian	British Group	Nominated
2005	Kasabian	British Live Act	Nominated
2005	Kasabian	British Rock Act	Nominated
2006	Kasabian	British Rock Act	Nominated
2007	Kasabian	British Group	Nominated
2007	Kasabian	British Live Act	Nominated
2010	Kasabian	British Group	Won
2010	West Ryder Pauper Lunatic Asylum	British Album of the Year	Nominated
2012	Kasabian	British Group	Nominated

== MOJO Awards ==
The MOJO Awards are the UK's annual music awards run by music magazine, MOJO. To date, Kasabian has won one award.

Year	Nominee / work	Award	Result
2010	West Ryder Pauper Lunatic Asylum	Best Album	Nominated
2010	"Fire"	Song of the Year	Won
2010	Kasabian	Best Live Act	Nominated

== Music Video Production Awards ==
The MVPA Awards are annually presented by a Los Angeles-based music trade organization to honor the year's best music videos.

Year	Nominee / work	Award	Result
2007	"Empire"	Best Alternative Video	Nominated

== Music Week Sync Awards ==
The Music Week Awards are UK's only music awards that recognise labels, publishing, live, retail, A&R, radio, marketing and PR, founded by the trade paper Music Week

Year	Nominee / work	Award	Result
2017	"Comeback Kid"	Video Game Soundtrack	Won

== NME Awards ==
The NME Awards is an annual music awards show founded by music magazine, NME. To date, Kasabian has won seven awards.

Year	Nominee / work	Award	Result
2007	Kasabian	Best Live Band	Won
2010	Kasabian	Best British Band	Nominated
2010	Kasabian	Best Live Band	Nominated
2010	West Ryder Pauper Lunatic Asylum	Best Album	Won
2010	West Ryder Pauper Lunatic Asylum	Best Album Artwork	Won
2012	Kasabian	Best British Band	Nominated
2012	Kasabian	Best Live Band	Won
2015	Kasabian	Best British Band	Won
2015	Kasabian	Best Live Band	Nominated
2015	Kasabian	Best Fan Community	Nominated
2015	Kasabian	Best Quote	Won
2015	48:13	Best Album	Won
2015	"Eez-eh"	Best Track	Nominated
2015	"Eez-eh"	Dancefloor Filler	Nominated
2015	Kasabian: Summer Solstice	Best Music Film	Nominated
2015	Kasabian headline Glastonbury	Music Moment Of The Year	Nominated

== Q Awards ==
The Q Awards are the UK's annual music awards run by music magazine, Q. To date, Kasabian has won four awards.

Year	Nominee / work	Award	Result
2004	Kasabian	Best New Act	Nominated
2006	"Empire"	Best Video	Nominated
2007	Kasabian	Best Live Act	Nominated
2009	Kasabian	Best Live Act	Nominated
2009	"Fire"	Best Track	Nominated
2009	West Ryder Pauper Lunatic Asylum	Best Album	Won
2010	Kasabian	Best Act In The World Today	Won
2010	Kasabian	Best Live Act	Nominated
2014	"Eez-eh"	Best Track	Nominated
2014	48:13	Best Album	Nominated
2014	Kasabian	Best Live Act	Won
2014	Kasabian	Best Act In The World Today	Won
2017	"You're in Love with a Psycho"	Best Track	Won

== UK Music Video Awards ==
The UK Music Video Awards is an annual award ceremony founded in 2008 to recognise creativity, technical excellence and innovation in music videos and moving images for music. Kasabian has received one award from three nominations.

Year	Nominee / work	Award	Result
2009	Live T4 Special	Best Live Music Coverage	Nominated
2012	Velociraptor!	Best Music AD	Won
2017	"Bless This Acid House"	Best Rock/Indie Video - UK	Nominated

== Žebřík Music Awards ==
Year	Nominee / work	Award	Result	Ref.
2011	Velociraptor!	Best International Album	Nominated	
