= Man of Simple Pleasures =

Single by Kasabian

from the album Velociraptor!
- Released: 7 May 2012
- Genre: Indie rock, acid rock
- Length: 3:51
- Label: RCA
- Songwriter: Sergio Pizzorno
- Producer: Dan the Automator

Kasabian singles chronology
"Goodbye Kiss" (2011)	"Man of Simple Pleasures" (2012)	"Eez-eh" (2014)

Velociraptor! track listing
- 1. "Let's Roll Just Like We Used To"; 2. "Days Are Forgotten"; 3. "Goodbye Kiss"; 4. "La Fée Verte"; 5. "Velociraptor"; 6. "Acid Turkish Bath (Shelter from the Storm)"; 7. "I Hear Voices"; 8. "Re-Wired"; 9. "Man of Simple Pleasures"; 10. "Switchblade Smiles"; 11. "Neon Noon"

"Man of Simple Pleasures" is a song by English rock band Kasabian from the band's fourth studio album, Velociraptor! (2011). It was released as the fourth and final single from the record on 7 May 2012.

== Release ==
The track was first released as a single A-side 10" vinyl on 7 May 2012.

A special EP was released together with the Italian 2012 reissue of Velociraptor!, including an exclusive remix of "Man of Simple Pleasures" featuring Italian rapper J-Ax.

== Music video ==
A music video was released before the single, on 18 April. The video features a man riding on a bike in a city, wearing a mask and a baseball bat on his back. The man's shirt keeps changing to each lyric, and the video ends with him playing baseball in slow motion.

== Track listing ==
10" vinyl
No.	Title	Length
1.	"Man of Simple Pleasures"	3:51
2.	"Days Are Forgotten" (KOAN Sound Remix)	3:47

Italian Special EP
No.	Title	Length
1.	"Man of Simple Pleasures" (feat. J-Ax)
2.	"Where Did All the Love Go?" (Live in Dublin)
3.	"Shoot the Runner" (Live in Dublin)
4.	"Velociraptor!" (Live in Leicester)
5.	"Re-Wired" (Live in Leicester)
6.	"Switchblade Smiles" (Live in Leicester)
7.	"Julie & the Moth Man"
8.	"Pistols at Dawn"
9.	"Narcotic Farm"

== Personnel ==
Kasabian

- Tom Meighan – lead vocals
- Sergio Pizzorno – acoustic and electric guitar, backing vocals
- Chris Edwards – bass
- Ian Matthews – drums

Additional personnel

- Daniel Ralph Martin – guitar, percussion

== Charts ==
Chart (2012)	Peak position
Belgium (Ultratip Bubbling Under Flanders)	55
Belgium (Ultratip Bubbling Under Wallonia)	24
