= West Ryder =

EP by Kasabian
- Released: May 2009

Kasabian EP chronology
| Fast Fuse (2007) | West Ryder (2009) |

West Ryder is an EP by rock band Kasabian and was released exclusively in the June 2009 issue of the German music magazine Musikexpress. A follow-up EP to Fast Fuse, this EP was another promotion for their third studio album, West Ryder Pauper Lunatic Asylum.

== Track listing ==
1. "Underdog" (radio edit) – 3:53
2. "Fire" – 4:10
3. "Vlad the Impaler" – 4:54
4. "Black Whistler" – 3:41
5. "Me Plus One" (Jacques Lu Cont mix) – 8:33
