= Mojo Awards =

Former music award ceremony

- Awarded for: Excellence in music
- Country: United Kingdom
- Presented by: Mojo
- First award: 2004
- Final award: 2010
- Website: http://blog.mojo4music.com/honours2008/

The Mojo Awards (or Mojo Honours Lists) was an awards ceremony that began in 2004 and ended in 2009 by Mojo, a popular music magazine published monthly by Bauer in the United Kingdom. The awards featured a mixture of readers' and critics' awards.

== 2010 Honourees ==
List of 2010 Mojo Awards Winners:

- Best Breakthrough Act: The Low Anthem
  - The Jim Jones Revue
  - John Grant
  - Florence and the Machine
  - Mumford & Sons
- Best Album: Richard Hawley, Truelove's Gutter
  - Kasabian, West Ryder Pauper Lunatic Asylum
  - Joanna Newsom, Have One on Me
  - Florence and the Machine, Lungs
  - Paul Weller, Wake Up the Nation
- Song of the Year: Kasabian, Fire
  - Richard Hawley, "Open Up Your Door"
  - Florence and the Machine, "You've Got the Love"
  - Arctic Monkeys, "Crying Lightning"
  - Rage Against the Machine, "Killing in the Name"
- Best Live Act: Midlake
  - Kasabian
  - Florence and the Machine
  - Rufus Wainwright
  - Arctic Monkeys
- Best Compilation Award: The Future Sound of London

Achievement Award

- Catalogue Release of the Year – The Beatles Remastered
- Mojo Medal – Mute's Daniel Miller
- Classic Songwriter – Roy Wood
- Hall of Fame – Jimmy Page
- Les Paul Award – Richard Thompson
- Lifetime Achievement Award – Jean-Michel Jarre
- Inspiration Award – The Teardrop Explodes
- Best Classic Album Award – The Stone Roses
- Vision Award – Oil City Confidential
- Maverick Award – Hawkwind
- Hero Award – Marc Almond
- Icon Award – Duane Eddy
- Outstanding Contribution to Music Award – Sigur Rós
- Roots Award – Kate & Anna McGarrigle

== 2009 Honourees ==
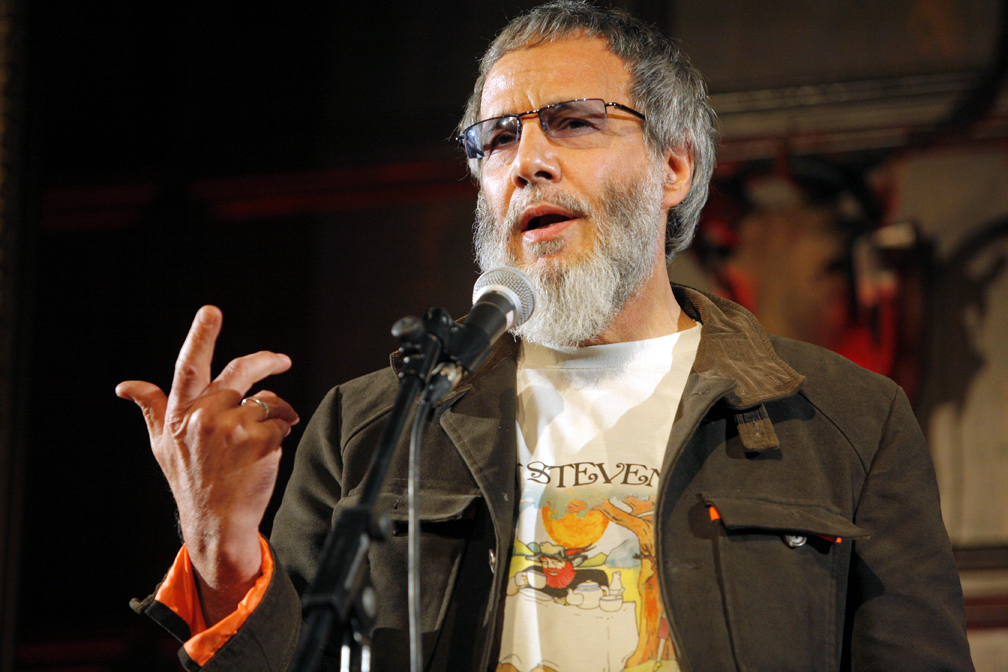
Yusuf Islam_Cat Stevens_Mojo Awards 2009

List of 2009 Mojo Awards Winners:

- Best Breakthrough Act: White Lies
  - Gallows
  - Eli "Paperboy" Reed
  - School of Seven Bells
  - Glasvegas
- Best Album: Paul Weller, 22 Dreams
  - Fleet Foxes, Fleet Foxes
  - Kings of Leon, Only by the Night
  - Elbow, The Seldom Seen Kid
  - PJ Harvey & John Parish, A Woman a Man Walked By
- Best Live Act: Fleet Foxes
  - Paul Weller
  - Leonard Cohen
  - Seasick Steve
  - Radiohead
- Song of the Year: Elbow, "One Day Like This"
  - Fleet Foxes, "White Winter Hymnal"
  - Kings of Leon, "Sex on Fire"
  - Franz Ferdinand, "Ulysses"
  - Animal Collective, "My Girls"
- Best Compilation Award: Take Me to the River: A Southern Soul Story 1961–1977

Achievement Award

- Inspiration Award – Blur
- Best Classic Album Award – The Zombies – Odessey and Oracle
- Vision Award – Joy Division
- Maverick Award – Manic Street Preachers
- Hero Award – The Pretty Things
- Icon Award – Phil Lynott
- Outstanding Contribution to Music Award – Joe Brown
- Roots Award – Topic Records
- Catalogue Release of the Year – Miles Davis
- Mojo Medal – Chris Blackwell/Island Records
- Classic Songwriter – Johnny Marr
- Hall of Fame – Mott the Hoople
- Les Paul Award – Billy Gibbons
- Lifetime Achievement Award – Yoko Ono

== 2008 Honourees ==
List of 2008 Mojo Awards winners:

- Song of the Year – "Mercy" by Duffy
- Best Live Act – Led Zeppelin
- Best Breakthrough Act – The Last Shadow Puppets
- Best Album Award – Dig, Lazarus, Dig! (Nick Cave & the Bad Seeds)
- Outstanding Contribution to Music – Paul Weller
- Icon Award – Sex Pistols
- Classic Songwriter – Neil Diamond
- Hero Award – Motörhead
- Hall of Fame – The Specials
- Lifetime Achievement Award – Genesis
- Special Award – Judy Collins
- Legend Award – Irma Thomas
- Classic Album Award – My Bloody Valentine for Loveless
- Inspiration Award – John Fogerty
- Roots Award – Toots Hibbert
- Les Paul Award – John Martyn
- Maverick Award – Mark E. Smith
- Vision Award – Julien Temple for The Future is Unwritten
- Compilation of the Year – Juno Original Soundtrack
- Catalogue Release of the Year – Pillows & Prayers

== 2007 Honourees ==
List of 2007 Mojo Awards winners:

- Album of the Year – The Good, the Bad & the Queen
- Song of the Year – "Rehab" by Amy Winehouse
- Best Live Act – Arcade Fire
- Breakthrough Act – Seasick Steve
- Catalogue Release – The Complete Motown Singles: Volume 6
- Classic Album Award – Exodus by Bob Marley
- Compilation – White Bicycles - Making Music in the 1960s
- Cult Hero – The Only Ones
- Hall of Fame Award – The Doors
- Hero Award – Alice Cooper
- Icon Award – Ozzy Osbourne
- Innovation in Sound Award – Suicide
- Inspiration Award – Björk
- Legend Award – Ike Turner
- Les Paul Award – Peter Green
- Lifetime Achievement Award – The Stooges
- Maverick Award – Echo & the Bunnymen
- The Mojo Medal – Jac Holzman of Elektra Records
- Outstanding Contribution – Joy Division
- Vision Award – Slade in Flame

== 2006 Honourees ==
List of 2006 Mojo Awards winners:

- Best New Act – Corinne Bailey Rae
- Catalogue Release – Johnny Cash – The Legend
- Classic Album Award – Tago Mago by Can
- Hall of Fame Award – Elton John
- Hero Award – Prince Buster
- Icon Award – Scott Walker
- Inspiration Award – Buzzcocks
- Les Paul Award – Brian May
- Lifetime Achievement Award – David Gilmour
- Maverick Award – The Jesus & Mary Chain
- The Mojo Medal – Jools Holland
- Merit Award – Bert Jansch
- Roots Award – Dan Penn & Spooner Oldham
- Songwriter Award – Chrissie Hynde
- Vision Award – Flaming Lips – Fearless Freaks

== 2005 Honourees ==
List of 2005 Mojo Awards winners:

- Best New Act – The Magic Numbers
- Catalogue Release – The Fall: Complete Peel Sessions
- Classic Album Award – Rum, Sodomy, and the Lash (The Pogues)
- Hall of Fame Award – Madness
- Hero Award – Roy Harper
- Icon Award – Siouxsie Sioux
- Image Award – Jim Marshall
- Inspiration Award – Gang of Four
- Legend Award – Dr. John
- Les Paul Award – Jeff Beck
- Lifetime Achievement Award – Robert Wyatt
- Maverick Award – Steve Earle
- The Mojo Medal – Chess Records
- Roots Award – Chris Hillman
- Songwriter Award – Paul Weller
- Vision Award – Martin Scorsese Presents the Blues

== 2004 Honourees ==
List of 2004 Mojo Awards winners:

- Catalogue Release – Muzik City, The Trojan Records Story
- Classic Album Award – Marquee Moon by Television
- Hall of Fame Award – Arthur Lee
- Hero Award – Roger McGuinn
- Icon Award – Morrissey
- Image Award – Bob Gruen
- Inspiration Award – The Clash
- Lifetime Achievement Award – James Brown
- Maestro Award – Jimmy Page
- Maverick Award – Red Hot Chili Peppers
- The Mojo Medal – Geoff Travis of Rough Trade Records
- Mondial Award – Sting
- Songwriter Award – Ray Davies
- Special Award – The Shadows
- Vision Award – Led Zeppelin DVD
