= Ben Kealey =

English musician

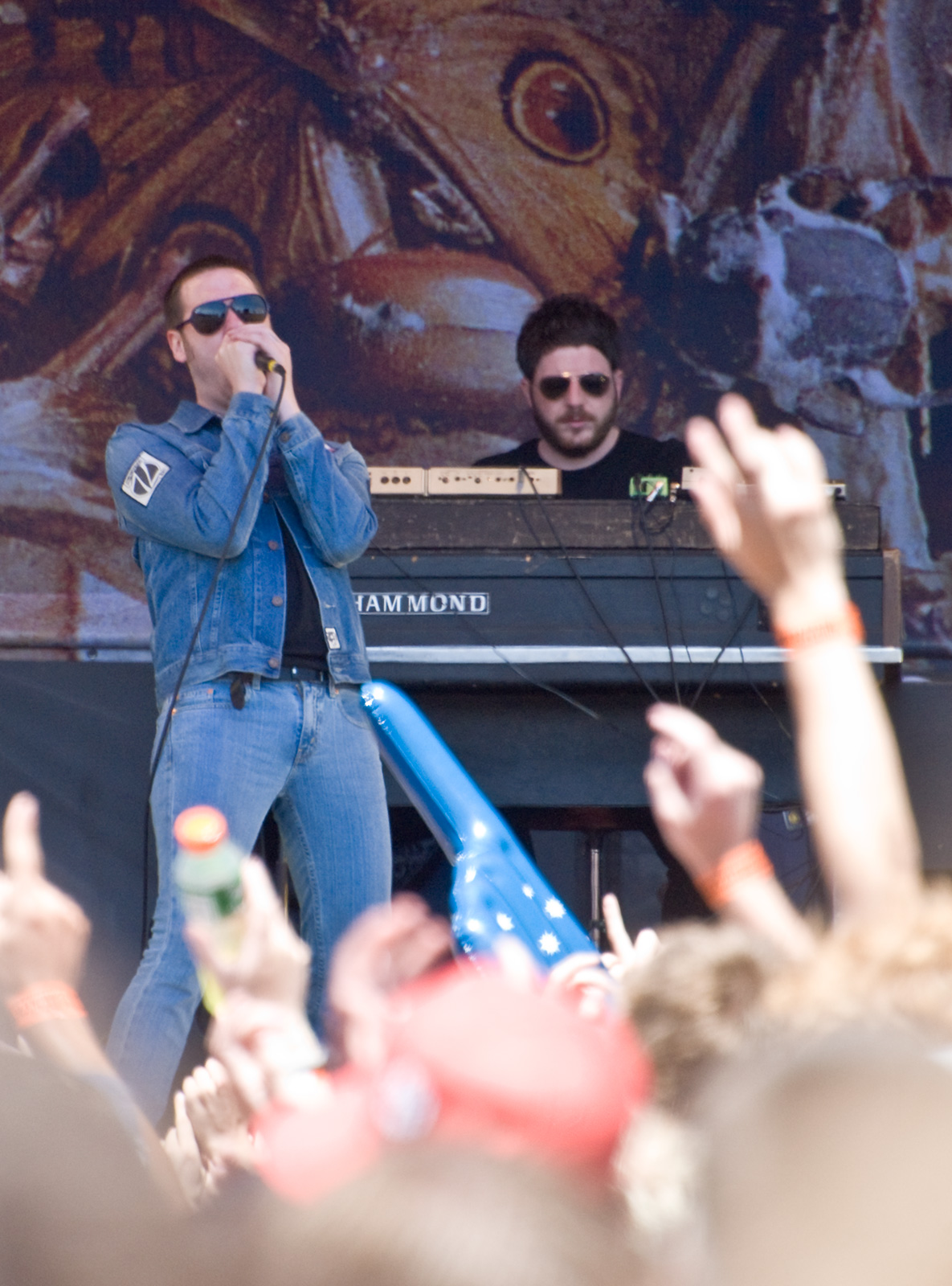
Kealey (right) performing with Kasabian in 2010

Ben Kealey is the former English touring keyboardist for the rock band Kasabian. He was born in Leicester, England.

== Career ==
=== Kasabian ===
Kealey was the drummer in the band in its original format, when the band was still called Saracuse. In 2006, he rejoined the band (now named Kasabian) as the keyboard and synth player. In 2009, he became a permanent touring member of Kasabian; he was not involved with most of the promotional work, but he did appear in the music video for "You're in Love With a Psycho". He is credited on the band's albums West Ryder Pauper Lunatic Asylum (2009), Velociraptor! (2011) and 48:13 (2014).

=== Film soundtracks ===
Kealey has played piano or other instruments on the soundtracks to several films, including London Boulevard and I Give It a Year.

== Personal life ==
As well as being a Grade 8 pianist, Kealey is also a contemporary artist, who has completed a number of pieces so far which concentrate on urban art, painted pianos, and bicycles. Kealey writes poetry, music, and sketches.

In April 2013, a piano designed by Kealey was unveiled as part of an urban art project at the Curve Theatre in Leicester.

== Equipment ==
Kealey utilises a Hammond B200 organ, Muse receptor rack modules triggered by Novation controller keyboards and a Korg microkorg synth. He uses an Electro Harmonix Memory man delay pedal, a Boss digital delay/echo pedal and an Ibanez distortion pedal.
