= Russell Howard's Good News =

British television series

- Russell Howard's Good News titlescreen
- Also known as: Russell Howard's Good News Extra (extended version)
- Genre: Topical comedy stand-up; Satire
- Created by: Russell Howard
- Presented by: Russell Howard
- Theme music composer: Kasabian – "Fast Fuse" (instrumental)
- Country of origin: United Kingdom
- Original language: English
- No. of series: 10
- No. of episodes: 96

Production
- Producers: Mark Iddon; Robyn O'Brien; David Howarth
- Production locations: Riverside Studios (Series 1–8); Shepperton Studios (Series 9); The London Studios (Series 10)
- Running time: 30 minutes; 45 minutes (Good News Extra)
- Production company: Avalon Television

Original release
- Network: BBC Three (2009–13); BBC Two (2014–15)
- Release: 22 October 2009 – 17 December 2015

Related
- The Russell Howard Hour

Russell Howard's Good News is a British comedy and topical news television show which was broadcast on BBC Three between 2009 and 2014, and on BBC Two between 2014 and 2015. Hosted by comedian Russell Howard, it offered his commentary on the news of the week through mostly stand-up, along with sketches and humorous video clips, whilst also having guest appearances from people who have been featured in the media recently. It was made by independent production company Avalon Television and produced by Mark Iddon, Robyn O'Brien and David Howarth. Repeats of earlier episodes are also broadcast on Comedy Central, Dave and W. The show also made an appearance on Children in Need 2011 and Red Nose Day 2013, featuring a number of sketches from recent episodes, as well as a new segment of "It's Not All Doom and Gloom". In February 2013, users of Digital Spy voted Good News as the Best Show Ever on BBC Three in the run-up to the channel's tenth anniversary.

On 9 June 2014, it was revealed that Good News would move from BBC Three to BBC Two following the broadcast of series 8. Series 9 was aired on BBC Two in late October of the same year, with the tenth and final series starting to air on 22 October 2015.

On 29 November 2016, the BBC announced that they have no immediate plans for another series of Good News for the foreseeable future, but said that Howard would still appear on their channels from time to time. Howard's show moved to Sky One, where it was retitled The Russell Howard Hour.

== Show format ==
The show's format focused primarily on looking into various news stories that have occurred around Britain or across the world that week, whether the story was a major piece or a simple minor one. Howard often provided commentary on these stories, often through stand-up, but also through using sketches, recurring gags (either within an episode, or throughout a series), clips taken from the internet (the owners are credited by the show), to derive comedy from either the story itself, or the subject it is dealing with. These stories were usually catalogued into various topics, with each topic cutting in between segments with stop-motion animated titles. These topics have included:

- Big News (begins regular show, following the early series)
- Sports
- Celebrity
- Society
- Crime and Punishment
- Politics (UK, World, and Weird)
- Art and Culture
- Animals
- Religion
- Children
- Health
- I Did Not Know That
- Technology
- Mystery Guest (Series 1-8), Guest (Series 9-10)
- What Were They Thinking?
- Stand Up (Good News Extra only)
- Royal Wedding (Series 4 only)
- People's Podium (Christmas Special and Series 5/6 only)
- Headliners (Special episodes of Series 7 and 8)
- It's Not All Doom and Gloom

Of these, only Big News, Mystery Guest/Guest and It's Not All Doom and Gloom were regular segments in the show, while topics for the other segments were determined by what news stories Howard looked into mostly for that week; some topics were mostly one-offs for a series, such as the Royal Wedding.

=== Mystery Guest/Guest ===
From Series 2 to Series 8, the show featured an interview segment called "Mystery Guest", which was always unrehearsed. In it, Howard was never told by his crew who he was meeting and interviewing, only that the guest he had was recently in the news during the week the episode was aired in; the story either featured in a national paper, a local/regional one, or a news website. As such, he had to guess what exactly they were in the news for, based upon clues provided by the guest and the crew, after which Howard would interview them, usually on their skills, hobbies, background, and why they performed something in the story they featured in. Often in most instances of this segment, his guest either did a demonstration of their abilities, or taught Howard something new, with the latter having seen him receive emergency rescue training, pick up new dance moves, play sports, and learn different fighting styles, amongst other things. In later series, a VIP guest was arranged by the crew for the series finale, who was famous in either TV, Film, or Sports and was someone Howard admired a lot; like other guests, Howard had to guess who they were thanks to clues given. Such guests were interviewed as always when identified, and some gave Howard something special to do with them; in one instance, Jeremy Bulloch, the original actor of Boba Fett from Star Wars performed a parody version of Mastermind, asking Howard questions on the movie franchise.

Because these segments were unrehearsed, Howard was not often prepared for what would occur on stage, especially if he was to be taught something physical, and in some cases, it led to issues. In an episode that was broadcast for Series 5, Howard had been taught how to do a series of simple stunts that he would use in a mocked fight scene with his guest. In order to prepare for this, he attempted to do a press-up on a breakable stool, which broke easily under his weight and caused him to fall hard upon his hand and break it. Although he managed to complete the segment after being initially checked up by the crew, his hand had to be set in a cast after filming for the episode, meaning that the remaining episodes for the series and the selection of guests for them had to be arranged to be less physically demanding on the comedian.

Beginning with Series 9, the segment was revised and changed, renamed to "Guest", and became primarily an interview between Howard and his special guest, who is often someone that has made a great achievement or important contribution to life, and that was picked out by the national news.

=== It's Not All Doom and Gloom ===
"It's Not All Doom and Gloom" is used to end the show, since the second series, on a feel-good moment and to usually break away from the show's comedy. This segment involves no comedy at all, as it primarily focuses on a heart-warming story, either of someone who has endured hardships in their life, troubles in their homeland, or disabilities to accomplish amazing feats or extraordinary achievements, a person who has done something incredible in their life, or someone who has done charity work to aid those less fortunate. The only exception where this segment never ended the show was on the extended version, where stand-up comedy followed it.

=== Attack on Philip Davies MP ===
In November 2015 Howard attacked Conservative MP Philip Davies on his BBC show calling him an "arsehole", "windbag", "wanker" and a "toad-faced hypocrite", accusing the MP of filibustering (talking out a bill). Following a repeat in March 2016, Davies complained on the grounds of "inaccuracy" and "misrepresentation" and the BBC was forced to publish in the Clarifications and Corrections section of its website stating "Davies did not personally use up all the time available for the debate and that almost three hours remained after he sat down". Howard was also found to have misrepresented Davies' views on the disabled and the BBC noted: "that the programme did not fully represent his comments, which were, that it would be in the best interests of disabled people, and others, to be allowed to offer to work for less than the minimum wage, if the alternative were no employment at all". The broadcaster also agreed not to air the episode again due to their misrepresentation of Davies' position. The BBC Trust later rejected a further escalation of the complaint made by Davies.

== Russell Howard's Good News Extra ==
Russell Howard's Good News Extra was an extended version of Good News, in the vein of Have I Got a Bit More News for You and QI XL. Usually broadcast on Saturday nights, Good News Extra episodes served as extended, uncut counterparts to those of the regular show. Typically, the episodes lasted 45 minutes long and feature a guest stand-up comedy act. The repeats shown on Comedy Central and Dave are actually Good News Extra episodes, but are simply listed as Russell Howard's Good News. Series 8 was the last series for which there was a Good News Extra version.

== Transmissions ==
Series	Start date	End date	Episodes
1	22 October 2009	17 December 2009	9
2	25 March 2010	13 May 2010	8
3	21 October 2010	25 December 2010	9
4	24 March 2011	12 May 2011	8
5	27 October 2011	15 December 2011	8
6	12 April 2012	28 June 2012	12
7	27 September 2012	13 December 2012	12
8	25 April 2013	11 July 2013	12
9	23 October 2014	8 January 2015	9
10	22 October 2015	17 December 2015	9

== Viewing figures ==
Episode viewing figures from BARB. They do not include views on BBC HD.

=== Series 1 ===
Episode no.	Airdate	Viewers (millions)	BBC Three weekly ranking	Multichannels rank	Good News Extra stand-up comic
1	22 October 2009	—N/a	—N/a	—N/a	Steve Hall
2	29 October 2009	—N/a	—N/a	—N/a	Wil Hodgson
3	5 November 2009	0.82	3	15	Craig Campbell
4	12 November 2009	0.60	10	—N/a	Tom Wrigglesworth
5	19 November 2009	0.66	7	—N/a	Phil Kay
6	26 November 2009	0.85	4	15	Carl Donnelly
7	3 December 2009	0.65	7	—N/a	Sarah Kendall
8	10 December 2009	0.70	6	19	No stand-up
9	17 December 2009	0.87	3	6	Colin Hoult (as Len Parker)

=== Series 2 ===
Episode no.	Airdate	Viewers (millions)	BBC Three weekly ranking	Multichannels rank	Good News Extra stand-up comic
1	25 March 2010	0.86	3	13	Al Pitcher
2	1 April 2010	1.07	4	11	Ray Peacock
3	8 April 2010	1.11	1	2	Lloyd Langford
4	15 April 2010	1.02	2	8	Wendy Wason (not broadcast)
5	22 April 2010	0.91	4	17	Arnab Chanda
6	29 April 2010	0.88	5	12	Seann Walsh
7	6 May 2010	—N/a	—N/a	—N/a	Chris Ramsey
8	13 May 2010	0.70	8	—N/a	Russell Kane

=== Series 3 ===
Episode no.	Airdate	Viewers (millions)	BBC Three weekly ranking	Multichannels rank	Good News Extra stand-up comic
1	21 October 2010	0.96	3	10	Jimmy McGhie
2	28 October 2010	0.96	4	14	Pete Johansson
3	4 November 2010	1.28	2	6	Elis James
4	11 November 2010	0.82	6	18	Roisin Conaty
5	18 November 2010	1.02	3	11	Ed Gamble
6	25 November 2010	0.87	3	23	Joe Wilkinson
7	2 December 2010	0.98	2	19	Nick Helm
8	9 December 2010	0.95	3	12	Matthew Osborn
9	25 December 2010	—N/a	—N/a	—N/a	Richard Herring

=== Series 4 ===
Episode no.	Airdate	Viewers (millions)	BBC Three weekly ranking	Multichannels rank	Good News Extra stand-up comic
1	24 March 2011	0.78	8	17	Dan Atkinson
2	31 March 2011	0.90	4	17	Hari Kondabolu
3	7 April 2011	0.85	6	16	Tony Law
4	14 April 2011	1.06	4	12	Joel Dommett
5	21 April 2011	0.98	8	18	James Acaster
6	28 April 2011	1.04	7	17	Andy Zaltzman
7	5 May 2011	1.12	5	14	Gareth Richards
8	12 May 2011	—N/a	—N/a	—N/a	Jason Cook

=== Series 5 ===
Episode no.	Airdate	Viewers (millions)	BBC Three weekly ranking	Multichannels rank	Good News Extra stand-up comic
1	27 October 2011	0.95	2	15	Steve Williams
2	3 November 2011	—N/a	—N/a	—N/a	Henry Paker
3	10 November 2011	0.89	3	17	John Robins
4	17 November 2011	0.99	3	10	Alun Cochrane
5	24 November 2011	1.21	2	4	Naz Osmanoglu
6	1 December 2011	1.07	2	15	Peacock and Gamble
7	8 December 2011	0.99	4	13	Celia Pacquola
8	15 December 2011	1.00	2	12	James Dowdeswell

=== Series 6 ===
Episode no.	Airdate	Viewers (millions)	BBC Three weekly ranking	Multichannels rank	Good News Extra stand-up comic
1	12 April 2012	0.95	5	16	Doc Brown
2	19 April 2012	0.86	5	29	Paul McCaffrey
3	26 April 2012	0.78	4	30	Dana Alexander
4	3 May 2012	1.02	1	11	Daniel Simonsen
5	10 May 2012	0.93	5	18	Paul Foot
6	17 May 2012	1.07	6	15	Hannibal Buress
7	24 May 2012	1.04	4	9	Iain Stirling
8	31 May 2012	0.94	5	13	Nina Conti
9	7 June 2012	1.07	3	6	Jarlath Regan
10	14 June 2012	—N/a	—N/a	—N/a	Angela Barnes
11	21 June 2012	—N/a	—N/a	—N/a	Tom Craine
12	28 June 2012	—N/a	—N/a	—N/a	Compilation special

=== Series 7 ===
Episode no.	Airdate	Viewers (millions)	BBC Three weekly ranking	Multichannels rank	Good News Extra stand-up comic
1	27 September 2012	1.08	3	7	Felicity Ward
2	4 October 2012	0.75	5	27	Glenn Wool
3	11 October 2012	0.73	5	23	Daniel Sloss
4	18 October 2012	0.91	2	14	Mae Martin
5	25 October 2012	0.82	3	19	Andrew Ryan
6	1 November 2012	1.07	1	10	Marcel Lucont
7	8 November 2012	0.79	1	21	Nathan Caton
8	15 November 2012	0.73	4	—N/a	Adam Bloom
9	22 November 2012	0.87	1	25	Reggie Watts
10	29 November 2012	0.85	3	26	Mark Smith
11	6 December 2012	0.70	4	—N/a	Compilation special
12	13 December 2012	0.84	3	20	Francesca Martinez

=== Series 8 ===
Episode no.	Airdate	Viewers (millions)	BBC Three weekly ranking	Multichannels rank	Good News Extra stand-up comic
1	25 April 2013	0.98	2	9	Eugene Mirman
2	2 May 2013	0.98	1	11	Aisling Bea
3	9 May 2013	0.89	1	11	Lou Sanders
4	16 May 2013	0.88	1	15	Bobby Mair
5	23 May 2013	1.09	1	5	Romesh Ranganathan
6	30 May 2013	1.09	1	3	Mark Cooper-Jones
7	6 June 2013	0.98	2	7	Matt Forde
8	13 June 2013	0.84	5	19	Liam Williams
9	20 June 2013	1.20	6	9	Jarred Christmas
10	27 June 2013	0.73	—N/a	28	Ginger and Black
11	4 July 2013	—N/a	—N/a	—N/a	Luke Toulson
12	11 July 2013	—N/a	—N/a	—N/a	Compilation special

=== Series 9 ===
Episode no.	Airdate	Viewers (millions)	BBC Two weekly ranking
1	23 October 2014	1.55	19
2	30 October 2014	1.37	26
3	6 November 2014	1.72	21
4	13 November 2014	1.30	28
5	20 November 2014	1.39	24
6	27 November 2014	1.37	25
7	4 December 2014	1.42	20
8	11 December 2014	1.35	25
9	8 January 2015 (compilation special)	—N/a	—N/a

=== Series 10 ===
Episode no.	Airdate	Viewers (millions)	BBC Two weekly ranking
1	22 October 2015	1.51	25
2	29 October 2015	1.43	22
3	5 November 2015	1.40	25
4	12 November 2015	1.50	22
5	19 November 2015	—N/a	—N/a
6	26 November 2015	1.49	26
7	3 December 2015	1.54	18
8	10 December 2015	—N/a	—N/a
9	17 December 2015 (compilation special)	1.30	26

== DVD releases ==
A DVD was released on 15 November 2010 entitled Best of Series 1.

A DVD of the Best of Series 2 was released on 24 September 2012.
