= 2004 Mojo Awards =

British music awards ceremony

The first annual Mojo Awards, distributed by Mojo magazine, were held during Spring 2004 in London. The awards were produced by the Mojo magazine team and attendance was by invitation only.

== Nominees ==
Complete list of nominees (winners in bold):

- Catalogue Release
  - **Muzik City, The Trojan Records Story**
- Classic Album Award
  - **Marquee Moon by Television**
- Hall of Fame Award
  - **Arthur Lee**
- Hero Award
  - **Roger McGuinn**
- Icon Award
  - **Morrissey**
- Image Award
  - **Bob Gruen**
- Inspiration Award
  - **The Clash**
- Lifetime Achievement Award
  - **James Brown**
- Maestro Award
  - **Jimmy Page**
- Maverick Award
  - **Red Hot Chili Peppers**
- The Mojo Medal
  - **Geoff Travis of Rough Trade Records**
- Mondial Award
  - **Sting**
- Songwriter Award
  - **Ray Davies**
- Special Award
  - **The Shadows**
- Vision Award
  - **Led Zeppelin DVD**
