= 48:13 =

2014 album by Kasabian

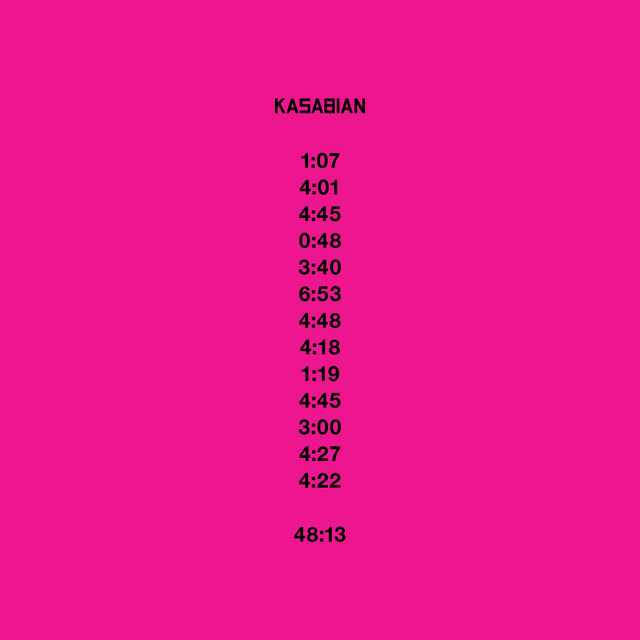

Studio album by Kasabian
- Released: 6 June 2014
- Recorded: 2013 in London, England
- Genres: Electronic rock; electronica
- Length: 48:13
- Label: Columbia
- Producer: Sergio Pizzorno

Kasabian chronology
Velociraptor! (2011)	48:13 (2014)	For Crying Out Loud (2017)

Singles from 48:13
- 1. "Eez-eh" Released: 29 April 2014; 2. "Bumblebeee" Released: 3 August 2014; 3. "Bow" Released: 10 October 2014 (Italy only); 4. "Stevie" Released: 7 November 2014

48:13 is the fifth studio album by English rock band Kasabian. The album, produced by the band's leader, songwriter, guitarist, and second vocalist Sergio Pizzorno (being their first album that Pizzorno produced for the band), and named after its total running time, was released in Germany on 6 June 2014 and in the UK on 9 June 2014. The album entered at number one on the UK Albums Chart in its first week of release making it the band's fourth consecutive UK number one album. The album received mixed-to-positive reviews from critics who were divided on the electronic-heavy direction as well as criticising the lyrics.

== Background ==
On 13 November 2013, Kasabian posted a teaser video on their official YouTube channel, announcing that the band's guitarist Sergio Pizzorno had been in the studio for the previous six months working on material for the new record. In an interview with QRO magazine, the band also revealed that the album would be produced by Pizzorno, who also co-produced their 2011 album Velociraptor!.

On 28 April 2014, Pizzorno said in a statement announcing the release of 48:13, "I felt that we had the confidence to be more direct, more honest with this album. I started to strip away layers rather than to just keep adding." Kasabian vocalist Tom Meighan added, "Less is more, you know? It's direct. It is what it is. Just listen to it. We've had the confidence to lay ourselves bare. Serge has stripped it right back. It's unbelievable."

== Composition ==
Kasabian have listed Kanye West, Joe Strummer Nirvana, Death Grips, Led Zeppelin, Rage Against the Machine and Beastie Boys as influences for the album. Comparisons were also drawn to bands including the B-52s, OMD and Scissor Sisters. Musically, the album represents a return to the hip hop influenced sound of their debut album combined with the space-rock and neo-psychedelic sound of their more recent releases.

48:13 is notable for being the band's only album before Meighan's departure in 2020 in which Pizzorno's lead vocal duties outweigh that of Meighan, with 4 tracks being sung by Pizzorno on the standard edition, 3 sung by Meighan and 3 tracks which feature both on lead vocals.

=== Tracks ===
Preceded by a 1-minute intro "shiva" that segues in, "bumblebeee" kicks the album off with a "pile-driving electronic rock" sound featuring gang vocals among its "pogoing chorus pulse [emphasising] the theme of togetherness in the sunshine and under the moonlight". It was described by Pizzorno as a "Beastie Boys dub with a sort of Zeppelin, Rage Against the Machine chorus". "stevie" features a driving beat and taut bass riff with strings and horns described as "menacing" and "dramatic", alongside an "empowering" chorus.

The interlude "(mortis)" features Pizzorno's grandfather Wilf Dillon reading in Latin. "doomsday" has been characterised as "glam ska-pop pushed through an electronic filter". "treat" has been regarded by Pizzorno as the "centrepiece" of the album, with its near 7-minute length divided into the first half featuring "razor-sharp guitars" and an acknowledgement to the band's hometown of Leicester, and the second half containing "floaty electronics" compirising a "glacial synth disco coda". "Glass" combines "cycling sequenced electronics"(Independent) with "eastern-tinged guitar" and outro from British spoken word poet Suli Breaks.

The electronic track "explodes" features "sub-bass wub-wubs, and analogue melodies redolent of Kraftwerk". Both this and the following interlude "(levitation)" have been compared to Velociraptor!, with the latter being described as an "Eastern psychedelic track" featuring Pizzorno on vocals. The psychedelic influences continue on "clouds", which was highlighted as an example of the band's "stadium-sized UK 60's psych-rock influences" and overall denoted as a "stirring electro rampage".

Lead single "eez-eh", derived from the Leicester pronunciation of 'easy' is an electro-rock song that features Meighan and Pizzorno singing in unison over "laser-guided galumph". This is succeeded by "bow", which has been defined as an "oddly slick teen-rock anomaly in the vein of Linkin Park" and featuring a contrast between "brooding verses and anthemic choruses". The close "s.p.s", an acronym for 'Scissors, Paper, Stone' is an acoustic-based ballad featuring lap steel guitar, strings and cricket chirping sounds.

== Promotion and singles ==
On 4 April 2014, Tom Meighan and Sergio Pizzorno appeared in East London dressed in white overalls, painting large numbers "48:13" on a wall belonging to artist and fashion designer Aitor Throup, with whom the band has previously worked on the cover art for Velociraptor! (2011) and the music video for "Switchblade Smiles". On 28 April 2014, the band announced the release of the album, and it became clear that the mural was referring to its title and artwork.

The album cover features simple black text on a pink background displaying the length of every track between the band and album title, although the deluxe edition omits the track lengths and enlarges the text. According to Pizzorno, he chose the pink colour scheme to go against the perception that Kasabian is a "very masculine" band, noting that "there’s a very punk element to it."

48:13 was promoted by the lead single "Eez-eh", released on 29 April 2014. A music video for the song, directed by Aitor Throup, was released onto YouTube the same day.

On 11 June 2014, Pizzorno featured alongside Pete Donaldson on his Absolute Radio show, during which full versions of "Stevie" and "Treat" were played. In support of the album, Kasabian made several appearances at festivals in Europe and Japan. The band also headlined the 2014 Glastonbury Festival, performing on the Pyramid Stage on 29 June.

The second single, "Bumblebeee" was released on 3 August 2014, with the music video, directed by Alex Courtes released on 27 July. Over two months before its release, on 29 May 2014, "Bumblebeee" was awarded Zane Lowe's Hottest Record. The B-side of the "Bumblebeee" single is "Gelfling", named after the creature of the same name from the film The Dark Crystal.

The third single, "Bow" features Pizzorno on lead vocals, their second single to do so after the 2007 single "Me Plus One". It was solely released in Italy, but received some airplay in the UK.

The fourth single, "Stevie", was a part of the soundtrack of the game, FIFA 15, made by EA Sports.

== Critical reception ==
Professional ratings
Aggregate scores
Source	Rating
Metacritic	62/100
Review scores
Source	Rating
AllMusic	3.5/5 stars
Clash	2/10
The Daily Telegraph	2/5 stars
Digital Spy	3.5/5 stars
Drowned in Sound	5/10
The Guardian	3/5 stars
The Independent	4/5 stars
NME	7/10 stars
The Observer	3/5 stars
Q	4/5 stars

48:13 received mixed reviews from music critics. At Metacritic, which assigns a normalized rating out of 100 to reviews from mainstream critics, the album received an average score of 62 based on 14 reviews, indicating "generally favourable" reviews.

Digital Spy's Lisa Wright commented that "Kasabian are not quite up to Alex Turner's level of social commentary," but concluded that "when Kasabian accept what they do best and run with it – and at least half of 48:13 stays resolutely in this spirit – they're the lairy masters of undeniably pumped-up hedonistic fun." Michael Hann of The Guardian wrote that the album is "properly exciting" and the band members "never forget that their purpose is to entertain," however, "the lyrics throughout are reliably terrible." James Hall of The Daily Telegraph wrote a scathing review of Meighan's lofty ambitions for the album, surmising that "no moulds were broken during the making of this album".

== Track listing ==
All songs written and produced by Sergio Pizzorno, and stylized in all lowercase.

No.	Title	Lead vocals	Length
1.	"(Shiva)"	(instrumental)	1:07
2.	"Bumblebeee"	Meighan/Pizzorno	4:01
3.	"Stevie"	Meighan	4:45
4.	"(Mortis)"	Dillon	0:48
5.	"Doomsday"	Meighan	3:40
6.	"Treat"	Meighan/Pizzorno	6:53
7.	"Glass"	Pizzorno/Breaks	4:48
8.	"Explodes"	Pizzorno	4:18
9.	"(Levitation)"	Pizzorno	1:19
10.	"Clouds"	Meighan	4:45
11.	"Eez-eh"	Meighan/Pizzorno	3:00
12.	"Bow"	Pizzorno	4:27
13.	"S.P.S."	Pizzorno	4:22
Total length:			48:13

Japanese and deluxe edition bonus tracks
No.	Title	Lead vocals	Length
14.	"Beanz"	Pizzorno	4:40
15.	"Gelfling"	(instrumental)	3:15
Total length:			56:06

Deluxe edition bonus DVD

- Live at Victoria Park, Leicester

== Personnel ==
Kasabian

- Tom Meighan – lead vocals
- Sergio Pizzorno – vocals, guitar, synthesizers, programming
- Chris Edwards – bass guitar
- Ian Matthews – drums, percussion

Technical personnel

- Sergio Pizzorno – production
- Mark "Spike" Stent – mixing
- Steve McLaughlin – engineering
- Mike Marsh – mastering
- Aitor Throup – design, directing

Additional musicians

- Tim Carter – guitar, production, additional drum programming
- Wilf Dillon – Latin reading on "(Mortis)"
- Ben Kealey – Wurlitzer on "Treat", piano on "Clouds"
- Gary Alesbrook – trumpet on "Stevie", "Treat" and "S.P.S."
- Trevor Mires – trombone on "Stevie", "Treat" and "S.P.S."
- Andrew Kinsman – saxophone on "Stevie", "Treat" and "S.P.S."
- Suli Breaks – additional vocals on "Glass"
- London Metropolitan Orchestra

== Charts and certifications ==
=== Weekly charts ===
Weekly chart performance for 48:13
Chart (2014)	Peak position
Australian Albums (ARIA)	11
Austrian Albums (Ö3 Austria)	22
Belgian Albums (Ultratop Flanders)	30
Belgian Albums (Ultratop Wallonia)	18
Danish Albums (Hitlisten)	40
French Albums (SNEP)	46
Dutch Albums (Album Top 100)	28
German Albums (Offizielle Top 100)	26
Irish Albums (IRMA)	2
Italian Albums (FIMI)	6
Japanese Albums (Oricon)	21
New Zealand Albums (RMNZ)	20
Polish Albums (ZPAV)	12
Scottish Albums (Official Charts)	1
Spanish Albums (Promusicae)	44
Swiss Albums (Schweizer Hitparade)	11
UK Albums (Official Charts)	1
US Independent Albums	37

=== Year-end charts ===
Year-end chart performance for 48:13
Chart (2014)	Position
Belgian Albums (Ultratop Wallonia)	196
Italian Albums (FIMI)	95
UK Albums (OCC)	27

=== Certifications ===
Certifications for 48:13
Region	Certification	Certified units/sales
United Kingdom (BPI)	Platinum	300,000^{‡}
^{‡} Sales+streaming figures based on certification alone.

== Release history ==
Release history and formats for 48:13
Country	Date	Label	Format(s)
Germany	6 June 2014	Sony Music	CD, 2×LP
France	9 June 2014	Sony Music	CD, 2×LP, digital download
Poland	9 June 2014	Sony Music	Digital download
United Kingdom	9 June 2014	Columbia	CD, 2×LP, digital download
Poland	10 June 2014	Sony Music	CD, 2×LP
Italy	10 June 2014	Sony Music	CD, 2×LP, digital download
Australia	14 June 2014	Sony Music	CD, 2×LP, digital download
New Zealand	17 June 2014	Sony Music	CD, 2×LP, digital download
Japan	18 June 2014	Sony Music	CD, 2×LP, digital download
United States	7 October 2014	Harvest	CD, 2×LP, digital download
