= Velociraptor! =

Studio album by Kasabian
- Released: 16 September 2011
- Recorded: November 2010 – March 2011 in Leicester, England
- Genres: Electronic rock; electronica; neo-psychedelia; space rock
- Length: 50:38
- Label: RCA
- Producers: Dan the Automator; Sergio Pizzorno

Kasabian chronology
West Ryder Pauper Lunatic Asylum (2009)	Velociraptor! (2011)	48:13 (2014)

Singles from Velociraptor!
- 1. "Days Are Forgotten" Released: 12 August 2011; 2. "Re-Wired" Released: 21 October 2011; 3. "Goodbye Kiss" Released: 20 February 2012; 4. "Man of Simple Pleasures" Released: 7 May 2012

Velociraptor! is the fourth studio album by English rock band Kasabian, released on 16 September 2011. The album has been described as expanding upon the neo-psychedelic feel of their previous album West Ryder Pauper Lunatic Asylum with a stronger emphasis on experimental song structures and instrumentation. It was released to critical acclaim and became their third UK number-one album.

== Release and promotion ==
"Switchblade Smiles" was made available as a free download to anybody who pre-ordered the album from the band's official website store from 7 June 2011. The track is also available as a free download on the band's fanpage on Facebook.

The album cover is an edited picture of all four band members covered in feathers (as Velociraptors were traditionally feathery) and screaming, edited from the "Switchblade Smiles" music video. Music videos for "Days Are Forgotten", "Re-Wired", "Goodbye Kiss", "Man of Simple Pleasures" and "Neon Noon" were also produced and released through the band's Vevo page on YouTube.

== Composition ==
The album has been noted for its blend of styles, combining Middle Eastern influences, rock and electronica, with Slant Magazine claiming the album is a "departure from the loutish club-rock with which Kasabian first made their name."

=== Tracks ===
The album opens with "Let's Roll Just Like We Used To", which begins with a gong, and features a Mexican trumpet riff, a 'funky, spy-movie bassline', and elements of mod. The second track and lead single "Days Are Forgotten" is a blues rock-leaning song boasting a 'filthy riff' alongside a 'trademark vowel-murdering, stadium-shaking chorus' and has also drawn comparisons to Led Zeppelin's "Immigrant Song". Described as a 'sublime ballad', "Goodbye Kiss" is atypical of the band's familiar style, and was covered by American singer Lana Del Rey for BBC Radio One's Live Lounge. "La Fee Verte" is named after the historical nickname for absinthe that translates into 'the green fairy' and was originally written and sung by Sergio Pizzorno for the soundtrack to London Boulevard. The song has drawn heavy comparisons to the Beatles and was described by Pizzorno as 'retro, but still sounds modern'. The title track has been labelled as an 'energetic rave-up' with 'grimy guitars, absurd lyrics and an air-punching chorus.'

"Acid Turkish Bath (Shelter From the Storm)" has been regarded as the biggest showcase of the album's Middle Eastern influences, featuring a 'wordless intro chant to the cutting strings and the brutal Bonham drumbeat'. The song was used in the end credits to the movie Killer Elite. "I Hear Voices" has been branded as 'Kraftwerk-inspired' electronica and has drawn comparisons to the 1982 sci-fi film Tron. The second single "Re-Wired" is an electronic rock and disco-inspired song and has been linked to the White Stripes. Fourth single "Man of Simple Pleasures" was described by Pizzorno as a 'country song played by zombies' and has been likened to Oasis as well as the track "Thick as Thieves" from the band's previous album West Ryder Pauper Lunatic Asylum. The pre-released free download track "Switchblade Smiles" has been regarded as a bridge between rock and electronica, featuring 'grungy guitar riffs threatening to smash the dance floor to bits.' The song was featured on the soundtrack for FIFA 12. The closing track "Neon Noon" is a 'reverb-drenched slow-burner' combining acoustic guitars, strings and electronic elements.

== Critical reception ==
Professional ratings
Aggregate scores
Source	Rating
Metacritic	79/100
Review scores
Source	Rating
Allmusic	4/5 stars
Consequence of Sound	4/5 stars
Digital Spy	4/5 stars
The Fly	8/10 stars
Guardian	4/5 stars
The Independent	4/5 stars
NME	8/10 stars
Q	4/5 stars
Slant	3.5/5 stars
Daily Telegraph	4/5 stars
Focus	6/10 stars

Velociraptor! received a strong critical reception and is often considered by fans and critics to be one of the band's strongest albums. On Metacritic, Velociraptor! has the band's highest rating with a score of 79 out of 100 based on 23 reviews, indicating "generally favorable reviews". Their previous best album score was 68, held by West Ryder Pauper Lunatic Asylum (2009).

NME reviewed the album positively, praising its ridiculousness and despite concluding that it falls short to its predecessor, it is "an album with 'much to love about it". Antiquiet gave it 4 1/2 stars out of 5 and declared that "Kasabian has found a way to channel everything you love about The Rolling Stones, Led Zeppelin and Radiohead while still keeping the unique sound that sets them apart from the contemporaries like Coldplay, Muse and The Killers."

== Commercial performance ==
The album debuted at number one on the UK Albums Chart, selling over 90,000 copies in its first week. In 2011, Velociraptor! sold 279,000 copies in the UK. With little support from Sony Music, the album failed to chart in the United States.

== Track listing ==
All tracks are written by Sergio Pizzorno.

No.	Title	Lead vocals	Length
1.	"Let's Roll Just Like We Used To"	Meighan	4:47
2.	"Days Are Forgotten"	Meighan	5:02
3.	"Goodbye Kiss"	Meighan	4:04
4.	"La Fée Verte"	Pizzorno	5:47
5.	"Velociraptor!"	Meighan/Pizzorno	2:51
6.	"Acid Turkish Bath (Shelter from the Storm)"	Pizzorno	6:01
7.	"I Hear Voices"	Meighan	3:58
8.	"Re-Wired"	Meighan	4:44
9.	"Man of Simple Pleasures"	Meighan	3:51
10.	"Switchblade Smiles"	Pizzorno/Meighan	4:13
11.	"Neon Noon"	Pizzorno	5:20

Japan Only Bonus Tracks
No.	Title	Lead vocals	Length
12.	"Pistols at Dawn"	Meighan/Pizzorno	5:18
13.	"Julie & The Moth Man"	Meighan	5:39
14.	"Black Whistler"	Pizzorno	3:41

Japanese Special Limited Edition Bonus Tracks
No.	Title	Length
15.	"Velociraptor!" (Live in Leicester)
16.	"Re-Wired" (Live in Leicester)
17.	"Switchblade Smiles" (Live in Leicester)

Super Deluxe Box Bonus Track
No.	Title	Length
12.	"Pistols at Dawn"	5:18

Deluxe Edition Bonus DVD: Live at The O2 Dublin, 27 November 2009
No.	Title	Length
1.	"Julie & The Moth Man"	8:29
2.	"Underdog"	5:05
3.	"Where Did All the Love Go?"	4:18
4.	"Swarfiga"	2:23
5.	"Shoot the Runner"	4:01
6.	"Cutt Off"	5:29
7.	"Processed Beats"	3:48
8.	"West Ryder Silver Bullet"	6:09
9.	"Thick as Thieves"	3:22
10.	"Take Aim"	6:13
11.	"Empire"	4:23
12.	"Last Trip (In Flight)"	3:03
13.	"I.D."	5:50
14.	"Ladies and Gentlemen, Roll the Dice"	3:59
15.	"Fire"	5:01
16.	"Fast Fuse"	6:01
17.	"The Doberman"	8:22
18.	"Club Foot"	5:33
19.	"Vlad the Impaler"	6:41
20.	"Stuntman"	5:29
21.	"L.S.F. (Lost Souls Forever)"	10:00

Super Deluxe Box / Japanese Special Limited Edition Bonus DVD
No.	Title	Length
1.	"Let's Roll Just Like We Used To" (Documentary)	24:01
2.	"The Story of the Velociraptor!" (Track by Track Commentary)	15:57
3.	"Velociraptor!" (Vevo Presents: Live in Leicester)
4.	"Days Are Forgotten" (Vevo Presents: Live in Leicester)
5.	"Re-Wired" (Vevo Presents: Live in Leicester)
6.	"Underdog" (Vevo Presents: Live in Leicester)
7.	"Fast Fuse" (Vevo Presents: Live in Leicester)
8.	"Vlad the Impaler" (Vevo Presents: Live in Leicester)
9.	"Switchblade Smiles" (Vevo Presents: Live in Leicester)
10.	"Fire" (Vevo Presents: Live in Leicester)
11.	"Switchblade Smiles" (Video)
12.	"Switchblade Smiles" (Making of)
13.	"Days Are Forgotten" (Video)
14.	"Days Are Forgotten" (Making of)
15.	"Re-Wired" (Video)
16.	"Re-Wired" (Making of)

Italian Special Edition Bonus Disc – Man of Simple Pleasures Italian Special EP
No.	Title	Length
1.	"Man of Simple Pleasures" (feat. J-Ax)
2.	"Where Did All the Love Go?" (Live in Dublin)
3.	"Shoot the Runner" (Live in Dublin)
4.	"Velociraptor!" (Live in Leicester)
5.	"Re-Wired" (Live in Leicester)
6.	"Switchblade Smiles" (Live in Leicester)
7.	"Julie & The Moth Man"
8.	"Pistols at Dawn"
9.	"Narcotic Farm"

iTunes Store Deluxe Version Bonus Tracks
No.	Title	Length
12.	"Pistols at Dawn"	5:18
13.	"Switchblade Smiles" (Video)	4:16
14.	"Switchblade Smiles" (Making of)	3:08
15.	"Days Are Forgotten" (Video)	4:08
16.	"Days Are Forgotten" (Making of)	3:29
17.	"Re-Wired" (Video)	4:19
18.	"Re-Wired" (Making of)	3:41
19.	"The Story of the Velociraptor!" (Track by Track Commentary)	15:53
20.	"Let's Roll Just Like We Used To" (Documentary)	23:56

== Personnel ==
Kasabian

- Tom Meighan – lead vocals (all tracks except 4, 6 and 11), backing vocals (tracks 4, 6 and 11)
- Sergio Pizzorno – lead and rhythm guitars, backing vocals (all tracks except 4, 6 and 11), lead vocals (tracks 4, 6 and 11), co-lead vocals (track 5 and 10), synthesizer, additional bass, production
- Chris Edwards – bass guitar
- Ian Matthews – drums

Additional musicians

- Jay Mehler – guitar
- Sandris Skyrimš – guitar
- Tim Carter – guitar, percussion
- Ben Kealey – keyboards
- Dan Ralph Martin – guitar, percussion (tracks 4 and 9)
- Gary Alesbrook – trumpet (tracks 1, 2, 4, 5 and 8)
- Mat Coleman – trombone (tracks 1, 2, 4, 5 and 8)
- Andrew Kinsman – saxophone (tracks 1, 2, 4, 5 and 8)
- London Metropolitan Orchestra – strings (tracks 1, 4, 6 and 8)
- Jessica Dannheisser – orchestration
- Andy Brown – conducting

Technical personnel

- Dan the Automator – production
- Tim Carter, Joe Kearns – engineering
- Stephen McLaughlin – production
- Aitor Throup – design and art direction
- Neil Bedford – photography

== Charts and certifications ==
=== Weekly charts ===
Chart (2011)	Peak position
Australian Albums (ARIA)	8
Austrian Albums (Ö3 Austria)	17
Belgian Albums (Ultratop Flanders)	16
Belgian Albums (Ultratop Wallonia)	11
Danish Albums (Hitlisten)	17
Dutch Albums (Album Top 100)	37
Finnish Albums (Suomen virallinen lista)	32
French Albums (SNEP)	14
Irish Albums (IRMA)	2
Italian Albums (FIMI)	11
Japanese Albums (Oricon)	10
Mexican Albums (Top 100 Mexico)	88
New Zealand Albums (RMNZ)	21
Polish Albums (ZPAV)	13
Scottish Albums (Official Charts)	1
Spanish Albums (Promusicae)	31
Swiss Albums (Schweizer Hitparade)	10
UK Albums (Official Charts)	1
UK Album Downloads (Official Charts)	1

=== Year-end charts ===
Chart (2011)	Position
UK Albums Chart	37
UK Rock Albums Chart	7
Chart (2012)	Position
Italian Albums Chart	66
UK Albums Chart	98

=== Certifications ===
Certifications for Velociraptor
Region	Certification	Certified units/sales
Italy (FIMI)	Gold	30,000^{*}
Poland (ZPAV)	Gold	10,000^{*}
United Kingdom (BPI)	2× Platinum	600,000^{‡}
^{*} Sales figures based on certification alone.^{‡} Sales+streaming figures based on certification alone.

== Release history ==
Region	Date	Format	Label
Australia	16 September 2011	CD, CD/DVD, Digital download	Sony Music
Belgium	16 September 2011	CD, CD/DVD, Digital download	Sony Music
Ireland	16 September 2011	CD, CD/DVD, Digital download	Sony Music
Italy	16 September 2011	CD, CD/DVD, Digital download	Sony Music
United States	16 September 2011	CD, CD/DVD, Digital download	Sony Music
France	19 September 2011	CD, CD/DVD, Digital download	Sony Music
New Zealand	19 September 2011	CD, CD/DVD, Digital download	Sony Music
United Kingdom	19 September 2011	CD, CD/DVD, Digital download	Columbia Records
Spain	20 September 2011	CD, CD/DVD, Digital download	Sony Music
Japan	21 September 2011	CD, CD/DVD, Digital download	Sony Music
