= You're in Love with a Psycho =

Single by Kasabian

from the album For Crying Out Loud
- Released: 17 March 2017
- Genre: Alternative rock; space rock; neo-psychedelia
- Length: 3:35
- Label: Columbia, Sony
- Songwriter: Sergio Pizzorno
- Producer: Sergio Pizzorno

Kasabian singles chronology
"Stevie" (2014)	"You're in Love with a Psycho" (2017)	"Are You Looking for Action?" (2017)

Alternative cover
- 10-inch vinyl single cover

"You're in Love with a Psycho" is a song by English alternative rock band Kasabian. It was released on 17 March 2017 as the first single from their sixth studio album, For Crying Out Loud (2017). It peaked at No. 62 on the UK Singles Chart in 2017, the first time a lead single from a Kasabian album failed to reach the top 40 in the country. It was certified platinum by the British Phonographic Industry (BPI) for chart sales exceeding 600,000 units in the UK in August 2022. It also won "Best Song of 2017" at the Q Awards.

The music video was heavily criticised in the UK media by mental health advocates and charities for reinforcing stereotypes around mental illness, and were branded by the director of the Time to Change mental health charity as "unhelpful, damaging, and disappointing".

== Release and recording ==
The song received its first radio airplay on 17 March 2017, having leaked the day before. The song was also released on 17 March 2017 as a digital download, CD single, and 10" vinyl and made available on most streaming services. The single reached number 62 in the UK Singles Chart spending 5 weeks on the top 100 and reached number 24 on the Scottish Singles Chart.

Kasabian guitarist and songwriter Serge Pizzorno explained to The Independent, "The story of that song is a man or a woman who has visions of being the prodigal son, thinking he's friends with Axel Foley... having an argument outside an off-licence and reciting Bukowski to win back the person they love."

== Critical reception ==
The song received mixed to positive reviews from critics upon release. Will Hankey from The Edge gave the song 3/5 stars, stating that the track "starts very well, opening with a Krautrock-like surge forward that soon anchors into Kasabian's familiar territory of live hip-hop beats [but] while this is amiable and still an enjoyable listen, the song still never really goes anywhere".

411 Mania gave the song 6.5/10 in a mixed review by David Hayter, stating, "The guitars provide more of a wash than an assault and Tom's vocals are gentle and endearing, contrasting the severity of the lyric sheet. [...] The music, on this occasion, is faultless (delicate, gently hypnotic and softly seductive); the lyrics vary from clunky to outright atrocious."

The single was nominated and won best song of 2017 at the Q Awards 2017.

== Music video ==
The inmates dancing in the music video

The music video for the single was released on 30 March 2017 and was directed by W.I.Z. It features frequent Kasabian collaborator Noel Fielding and actor Stephen Graham, as well as members of Kasabian and Bhangra dance group Four by Four. They all play inmates of the fictional West Ryder Pauper Lunatic Asylum, a nod to the title of the band's third album. The inmates have become infatuated with the resident nurse, dancing and serenading her to no avail. At the end of the video, it is revealed that the nurse is in fact in love with the inmate played by Graham.

As of December 2022, the music video has been viewed over 15.1 million times on YouTube.

== Controversy ==
The video was heavily criticised in the UK media by mental health advocates and charities for reinforcing stereotypes around mental illness.

Cal Strode, Senior Media Officer at the Mental Health Foundation, said, "The video shows a lack of imagination and inspired creative input, falling back on outdated and damaging stereotypes to grab people's attention. [...] We've come a long way in terms of public attitudes towards mental health and reducing stigma, but when people pose as psychiatric inpatients as props for a music video, it reminds us there's still a long way to go."

Sue Baker OBE, director of the Time to Change mental health charity, said, "As so many musicians have recently talked openly about their experiences of mental health problems it is disappointing to see this video. The use of the word 'psycho' in a song and accompanying music video featuring people pretending to be psychiatric inpatients is unhelpful, damaging and disappointing when society is moving on from this sad and tired stereotype. We are sure the insult and harm was unintentional, or misjudged irony, but we are raising it as we know it will only serve to fuel stigma."

== Track listings ==
Digital download, CD single, Streaming
No.	Title	Length
1.	"You're in Love with a Psycho"	3:37

10-inch vinyl
No.	Title	Length
1.	"You're in Love with a Psycho"	3:37
2.	"Are You Looking For Action?"	8:22

== Personnel ==
Kasabian

- Tom Meighan – lead vocals
- Sergio Pizzorno – guitars, co-lead vocals, synthesizers, programming, production
- Chris Edwards – bass, backing vocals
- Ian Matthews – drums

== Charts ==
Weekly chart performance for "You're in Love with a Psycho"
Chart (2017)	Peak position
Belgium (Ultratip Bubbling Under Flanders)	16
Belgium (Ultratip Bubbling Under Wallonia)	24
Scotland Singles (Official Charts)	24
Switzerland Airplay (Schweizer Hitparade)	92
UK Singles (Official Charts)	62
UK Physical Sales Chart (Official Charts Company)	33
UK Vinyl Chart (Official Charts Company)	4

== Certifications ==
Certifications for "You're in Love with a Psycho"
Region	Certification	Certified units/sales
United Kingdom (BPI)	Platinum	600,000^{‡}
^{‡} Sales+streaming figures based on certification alone.
