= Bumblebeee =

Single by Kasabian

from the album 48:13
- B-side: "gelfling"
- Released: 3 August 2014
- Recorded: 2013, London, UK
- Genre: Hard rock, acid rock, electronic rock
- Length: 4:01
- Label: Columbia, Sony Music
- Songwriter: Sergio Pizzorno
- Producer: Sergio Pizzorno

Kasabian singles chronology
"Eez-eh" (2014)	"Bumblebeee" (2014)	"Bow" (2014)

"Bumblebeee" (stylised as "bumblebeee") is a song by English rock band Kasabian - the second single from their fifth studio album, 48:13. The single was released on 3 August 2014 as the follow-up to 48:13's lead single, "eez-eh". It peaked at #165 on the UK Singles Chart. The b-side, "gelfling", is named after the characters from the film The Dark Crystal, and is an electronic track without any main vocals.

== Composition ==
Sergio Pizzorno described the song as having a "Beastie Boys dub with a sort of Zeppelin, Rage Against the Machine chorus". "bumblebee" was the first track to be written for 48:13.

It is one of the few tracks where Tom Meighan and Sergio Pizzorno share lead vocals, with the former singing the verses and the latter singing the chorus.

== Promotion ==
"bumblebeee" was Kasabian's opening track during their set as headliners at Glastonbury 2014. The track has also been the opener for the majority of gigs for the 48:13 tour. The band has performed acoustic versions of "bumblebeee" on various occasions. On 12 September 2014, they performed the song on the first episode of series thirteen of Alan Carr: Chatty Man.

== Video ==
The video for "bumblebeee" was released on 27 July 2014, having been accidentally released and subsequently deleted on 23 July. The video features the band all in white on a white background and various scenes show Meighan crowdsurfing and stampedes of men and dogs.

== Personnel ==
Kasabian

- Tom Meighan – lead vocals (verses)
- Sergio Pizzorno – lead vocals (choruses), guitar, synthesizers, programming, production
- Chris Edwards – bass
- Ian Matthews – drums

Additional personnel

- Tim Carter – acoustic and electric guitars

== Charts ==
Chart (2014)	Peak position
UK Singles Chart	165
