= Goodbye Kiss =

Single by Kasabian

from the album Velociraptor!
- Released: 20 February 2012
- Genre: Britpop
- Length: 4:03
- Label: RCA
- Songwriter: Sergio Pizzorno
- Producer: Dan the Automator

Kasabian singles chronology
"Re-Wired" (2011)	"Goodbye Kiss" (2012)	"Man of Simple Pleasures" (2012)

Velociraptor! track listing
- 1. "Let's Roll Just Like We Used To"; 2. "Days Are Forgotten"; 3. "Goodbye Kiss"; 4. "La Fée Verte"; 5. "Velociraptor"; 6. "Acid Turkish Bath (Shelter from the Storm)"; 7. "I Hear Voices"; 8. "Re-Wired"; 9. "Man of Simple Pleasures"; 10. "Switchblade Smiles"; 11. "Neon Noon"

"Goodbye Kiss" is the third single by Kasabian from their fourth studio album, Velociraptor! (2011). It was released first as a music video and then as a single A-side 10" vinyl on 20 February 2012. It is available as a digital download. On 27 November 2011, Kasabian performed "Goodbye Kiss" during the BBC's Formula 1 and performed on 2011 closing season montage and on BBC's The Graham Norton Show.

== Music video ==
Regarding the video release, the band have left the following message along on their official website: "Shot in no-nonsense, classic black and white, it captures the band live on stage during their massive gigs at London's O2.". Being a live video, it also features guitarist Jay Mehler, live keyboardist Ben Kealey and trumpet player Gary Alesbrook on tambourine.

== Track listing ==
iTunes single
No.	Title	Length
1.	"Goodbye Kiss"	4:04
2.	"Narcotic Farm"	3:03
3.	"Narcotic Farm" (Actress's Mad House mix)	3:47

== Personnel ==
- Tom Meighan – lead vocals
- Sergio Pizzorno – acoustic and electric guitar, piano, backing vocals
- Chris Edwards – bass
- Ian Matthews – drums, percussion
- London Metropolitan Orchestra – strings

== Charts ==
=== Weekly charts ===
Weekly chart performance for "Goodbye Kiss"
Chart (2012)	Peak position
Belgium (Ultratip Bubbling Under Flanders)	17
Belgium (Ultratip Bubbling Under Wallonia)	29
Italy (FIMI)	9
Switzerland Airplay (Schweizer Hitparade)	81
UK Singles (Official Charts)	76

=== Year-end charts ===
Year-end chart performance for "Goodbye Kiss"
Chart (2012)	Position
Italy (FIMI)	49

=== Certifications ===
Certifications for "Goodbye Kiss"
Region	Certification	Certified units/sales
Italy (FIMI)	Platinum	30,000^{*}
^{*} Sales figures based on certification alone.

== Lana Del Rey version ==
American singer-songwriter Lana Del Rey covered the song for Radio One's Live Lounge on April 20, 2012. Her performance's original upload to YouTube garnered 3.8 million views, while unofficial uploads have collectively gathered 13.4 million views on the platform as of August 2020. Unlike the original upbeat track, Del Rey's version was stripped – being only accompanied by acoustic guitars and piano backing.

While talking about her choice of the song, Del Rey commented "All of my boyfriends had loved Kasabian and I'd never listened to them. I started and I really like this song. I love this song and I love the melody, I love the way the boys sing it. The cover was prompted by the band performing their own rendition of Del Rey's track "Video Games" also during a Live Lounge session.

Christopher Rosen of The Huffington Post commented that Del Rey's rendition is "more mournful and overwrought, but still kinda good". Andrew Martin of Complex magazine wrote that "Her stripped-down cover glides by on the strength of her chill vocals and some equally subdued guitar and piano. You can watch the performance above." Serge Pizzorno of Kasabian commented that Del Rey's cover was "fucking beautiful" adding that "I'm really proud. Obviously we covered one of hers, 'Video Games', so it was quite a sweet thing to do back. It's a really nice gesture. It's proper old-school."
