= Stevie (Kasabian song) =

Single by Kasabian

from the album 48:13
- Released: 7 November 2014
- Recorded: 2013 in London, England
- Genre: Alternative rock, new prog
- Length: 4:45
- Label: Columbia; Sony
- Songwriter: Sergio Pizzorno
- Producer: Sergio Pizzorno

Kasabian singles chronology
"Bow" (2014)	"Stevie" (2014)	"You're in Love with a Psycho" (2017)

"Stevie" (stylised as "stevie") is a song by English rock band Kasabian. It was released as the fourth single from their fifth studio album, 48:13, on 7 November 2014. The music video for the song was uploaded to YouTube on 13 October 2014. It is also featured as soundtrack on EA Sports game, FIFA 15. Also, according to Kasabian, the original inspiration for Stevie is actually Susie.

== Music video ==
The official music video for the song, directed by Ninian Doff, was uploaded on 13 October 2014 to the band's Vevo channel on YouTube at a duration of four minutes and forty-seven seconds.

== Track listing ==
- Columbia – PARADISE94

Single-sided 10" / digital download
No.	Title	Length
1.	"stevie"	4:45

== Personnel ==
Kasabian

- Tom Meighan – lead vocals
- Sergio Pizzorno – electric guitar, backing vocals, synthesizers, programming, production
- Chris Edwards – bass
- Ian Matthews – drums

Additional personnel

- Gary Alesbrook – trumpet
- Trevor Mires – trombone
- Andrew Kinsman – saxophone
- London Metropolitan Orchestra – strings

== Chart performance ==
Chart (2014)	Peak position
Belgium (Ultratip Bubbling Under Flanders)	64
UK (Physical Singles)	6
