= Days Are Forgotten =

Single by Kasabian

from the album Velociraptor!
- B-side: "Pistols at Dawn"; "Switchblade Smiles" (Music video)
- Released: 12 August 2011
- Genre: Blues rock
- Length: 5:02 (album version); 4:05 (single version)
- Label: RCA
- Songwriter: Sergio Pizzorno
- Producer: Dan the Automator

Kasabian singles chronology
"Vlad the Impaler" (2010)	"Days Are Forgotten" (2011)	"Re-Wired" (2011)

Velociraptor! track listing
- 1. "Let's Roll Just Like We Used To"; 2. "Days Are Forgotten"; 3. "Goodbye Kiss"; 4. "La Fée Verte"; 5. "Velociraptor"; 6. "Acid Turkish Bath (Shelter from the Storm)"; 7. "I Hear Voices"; 8. "Re-wired"; 9. "Man of Simple Pleasures"; 10. "Switchblade Smiles"; 11. "Neon Noon"

"Days Are Forgotten" is a song by British rock band Kasabian. The song serves as the lead single of the band's fourth studio album, Velociraptor!. The song was first released in Belgium on 12 August, and was later released in the United Kingdom on 9 September 2011 - where it debuted at number 28 on the UK Singles Chart. An edited version of the song serves as the theme tune to the Young Sherlock series.

== Music video ==
The black-and-white video for the song features the band in an empty room playing animated instruments, drawn with white crayon pencil; singer Tom Meighan sings into a pencil-drawn microphone with a pencil-drawn cable. Throughout the video the music generates soundwaves, also pencil-drawn, which blow up a guitar amplifier and the instruments themselves. At the end of the video, all of the white pencil lines collapse into op art-like geometrical shapes, until the entire environment dissolves into a single line.

== Remix ==
The Z-Trip Remix features the American rapper, entrepreneur and actor LL Cool J. This remix served as the official theme to WWE's TLC: Tables, Ladders & Chairs pay-per-view.

In 2026, a version of the song, sung by Pizzorno, served as the opening theme for television series Young Sherlock.

== Track listing ==
UK iTunes EP
No.	Title	Length
1.	"Days Are Forgotten" (Single edit)	4:05
2.	"Days Are Forgotten" (Z-Trip Remix) (featuring LL Cool J)	4:57
3.	"Pistols at Dawn"	5:18
4.	"Switchblade Smiles" (Music Video)	4:16

== Charts ==
Chart (2011)	Peak position
Belgium (Ultratip Bubbling Under Flanders)	10
Belgium (Ultratop 50 Wallonia)	45
Czech Republic Modern Rock (IFPI)	10
Japan (Japan Hot 100)	10
Scottish Singles Sales (Official Charts)	30
UK Singles (Official Charts)	28

=== Chart performance ===
The single made its first appearance on the UK Singles Chart on 15 September 2011, when it debuted at number twenty-eight. On its second week, the single fell fourteen places to number forty-two; before returning to the top 40 at number thirty-six on 2 October - following a price reduction on the UK iTunes store.

== Certifications ==
Certifications and sales for "Days Are Forgotten"
Region	Certification	Certified units/sales
United Kingdom (BPI)	Silver	200,000^{‡}
^{‡} Sales+streaming figures based on certification alone.

== Release history ==
Country	Release date	Format
Australia	12 August 2011	Digital download
Belgium	12 August 2011	Digital download
France	12 August 2011	Digital download
Germany	12 August 2011	Digital download
New Zealand	12 August 2011	Digital download
Canada	9 September 2011	Digital download
Ireland	9 September 2011	Digital download
United Kingdom	9 September 2011	Digital download
Spain	9 September 2011	Digital download
Mexico	9 September 2011	Digital download

== Personnel ==
=== Kasabian ===
- Tom Meighan – lead vocals
- Sergio Pizzorno – guitars, synths, programming, backing vocals
- Chris Edwards – bass
- Ian Matthews – drums

=== Additional personnel ===
- Gary Alesbrook – trumpet
- Tim Carter--guitar, keyboards, drums, and flute
- Mat Coleman – trombone
- Andrew Kinsman – saxophone

Remix

- Z-Trip – remixing
- LL Cool J – rap vocals
