= Neil Bedford =

British photographer

Neil Bedford (born 13 December 1981, Bradford, England) is a British photographer, known for his work in advertising and being the official Kasabian photographer.

== Education and career ==
Bedford studied photography in London, first gaining a First Class Honours in fashion photography at BA level before being award a Distinction for his MA, both at the London College of Fashion.

He started touring with Kasabian in 2011 after he met them through Aitor Throup on the set of their music video for Switchblade Smiles. He has photographed numerous bands, musicians, actors and sports stars including Pharrell, Liam Gallagher, Kobe Bryant, Ed Sheeran, Nico Rosberg, Wiz Khalifa, Ian Brown, ASAP Ferg, Jamie Dornan, Rupert Grint, Lionel Messi, Leon Bridges and Ray Winston.

In 2016, Bedford released his first publication in collaboration with Kasabian, titled UNDERDOGS, which documented their two shows at The King Power Stadium in light of Leicester City winning the Premier League. The book was a limited edition run of 500 which sold out in two days. He was then commissioned to shoot the band's album artwork for their For Crying Out Loud record which released in 2017, knocking Ed Sheeran from the number one spot in the UK and giving Kasabian their fifth number one selling album.

Bedford is currently represented by the photographic agency Making Pictures, London.

== Notes ==
- Its Nice That interview 2016
- Bang & Olufsen Journal 2015
