= Bless This Acid House =

2017 single by Kasabian

Single by Kasabian

from the album For Crying Out Loud
- Released: 4 May 2017
- Recorded: 2016–2017
- Genre: Alternative rock; psychedelic rock
- Label: Columbia; Sony
- Songwriter: Sergio Pizzorno
- Producer: Sergio Pizzorno

Kasabian singles chronology
"Ill Ray (The King)" (2017)	"Bless This Acid House" (2017)	"Comeback Kid" (2017)

"Bless This Acid House" is a song by alternative rock band Kasabian. It was released as the third single from their sixth studio album, For Crying Out Loud on 4 May 2017. The single peaked at number 65 on the Scottish Singles Chart in 2017.

The song is nominated for the "Best Track" category at the NME Awards 2018. It was also nominated for "Best Rock/Indie Video" at the UK Music Video Awards 2017.

== Background and recording ==
Speaking about the album recording and in particular the single, Pizzorno in an interview with Q magazine said this of the song "It's a beauty. It's a mad time, with what's been happening – it felt like the world was caving in around me. But I felt that everyone had said enough, like everyone had had their say, so this tune is just pure positive energy. Speaking on the inspiration for the track he said "I went round my mate's house and he's got this [Jeremy Deller-designed] poster and I thought, 'I love that', so I wrote a tune about it, but now I'm finished."

== Critical reception ==
Reception to the single has been mixed to positive. In their review for the album NME was very positive of the track, stating "Best of all is the fabulously corny 'Bless This Acid House', with its lovably naff call-and-response pre-chorus. The greatest song Status Quo never wrote, it's dumb, fun and guaranteed to bring a smile to your face. Drowned in Sound were also positive about the song with Luke Beardsworth saying "'Bless This Acid House' is the best track on the album, despite the name making you wince. It's comfortably the catchiest thing here too, sounds a bit like 'C'est La Vie' by Stereophonics, which itself sounded quite a lot like Bowie. It's the one that should hang around setlists for years to come."

The Quietus in their review of the album by Patrick Clarke was less positive about the track; "'Bless This Acid House' is the record's particular nadir, and the starkest illustration of what's wrong with the new Kasabian album. Shooting for anthemic but landing in some unhappy medium between a limp imitation of Primal Scream's Give Out… and every 'summer anthem' a team of faceless major label songwriters could ever try to conjure."

== Music video ==
The official "Bless This Acid House" video was directed by WIZ and filmed in a flat in London in May 2017. The video was shot in black and white and features the band dressing up as prison inmates, performing in a squat-like setting to a crowd of revelers and punk rockers. It was officially released on 13 June 2017, with an extended "director's cut" version being posted by WIZ the following day.

The video was nominated in the category "Best Rock/Indie Video" UK at the UK Music Video Awards 2017 but lost out to eventual winners Royal Blood with their video for "Lights Out".

It is the band's final video to feature lead vocalist Tom Meighan before his departure in 2020, as neither him nor the rest of the band appeared in the music video for "Ill Ray (The King)", and no video was produced for the album's final single "Comeback Kid".

== Track listing ==
Digital download and streaming
No.	Title	Length
1.	"Bless This Acid House"	3:44

== Personnel ==
Kasabian

- Tom Meighan – lead vocals
- Sergio Pizzorno – guitar, backing vocals, synthesizers, production
- Chris Edwards – bass
- Ian Matthews – drums, tambourine

Additional personnel

- Tim Carter – guitar, backing vocals
- Ben Kealey – backing vocals

== Charts ==
Chart (2017)	Peak position
Scotland Singles (Official Charts)	65
