= Eez-eh =

2014 single by Kasabian

Single by Kasabian

from the album 48:13
- B-side: "beanz"
- Released: 29 April 2014
- Recorded: 2013 in London, England
- Genre: Dance-rock; indie pop; electronic rock
- Length: 3:00
- Label: Columbia; Sony Music
- Songwriter: Sergio Pizzorno
- Producer: Sergio Pizzorno

Kasabian singles chronology
"Man of Simple Pleasures" (2012)	"Eez-eh" (2014)	"Bumblebeee" (2014)

"Eez-eh" (stylised as "eez-eh") is a song by English rock band Kasabian from their fifth studio album, 48:13. The song was released as the lead single to promote the album on 29 April 2014.

== Composition ==
The single embraces a slight change in style for Kasabian, resembling electronic dance music more than their previous work. In an interview, Pizzorno revealed that the song's production was inspired by Giorgio Moroder, who had said 120 bpm was a "magic tempo".

The song's title is derived from the pronunciation of the word "easy" in the local accent of Leicester, the band's hometown. Meighan described the song as a "working class anthem" and said he would like the song to have the same effect on people as "Born Slippy", a well-known 1996 number two single by electronic group Underworld.

Commenting on the song's lyrics, which include lines such as "I've got the feeling that I'm gonna keep you up all night", Pizzorno said, "It's more a conversation that me and [Meighan] might have at five or six in the morning. There have been so many nights in hotel rooms where me and Tom will stay up all night talking and it's about that."

The lyric "everyone's on bugle" is often replaced with the previous line "every day is brutal" on some versions, such as the official music video and radio edit, as "bugle" is a slang term for cocaine.

== Promotion and release ==
The group performed "Eez-eh" along with two other tracks from 48:13 – "Bumblebeee" and "Stevie" – on Later... with Jools Holland on 13 May 2014. After being released in April throughout Europe and in Australia, the single was released in the United Kingdom on 1 June 2014. A second version of the single, containing the B-side "Beanz", was released digitally on 3 June 2014. The band also performed the single on The Graham Norton Show on 13 June 2014. The band also performed the track at Glastonbury Festival 2014. Live performances of the track are usually extended.

== Reception ==
According to NME magazine, the song is "pure '90s rave." Rhian Daly also noted that the track is "far from being a serious take on the world's issues," and Kasabian keeps things "tongue-in-cheek, cartoon-like and – most importantly – fun." Antiquiet.com described the song as "without a doubt the most electronic-tinged release since the band's breakthrough self-titled first album."

== Music video ==
A music video for the song was released onto YouTube on 29 April 2014. It was directed by Aitor Throup, who also designs sets for live shows and artwork. The video features Swedish actress Noomi Rapace.

The video features the band dancing and posing in front of a large karaoke screen showing the lyrics of the song. Segments of the video see the members jumping up and down in a line, ornaments of various animals and frontman Tom Meighan spitting milk into the lens of the camera. Sergio Pizzorno appears both wearing a '48:13' T-shirt and without a shirt, often also wearing large foam hands. Bassist Chris Edwards also appears, at one stage wearing a Groucho Marx disguise and smoking a cigar, and drummer Ian Matthews appears, wearing a snapback with pipes connected to his mouth.

== Track listing ==
Digital download – Version 1
No.	Title	Length
1.	"eez-eh"	3:00

Digital download – Version 2
No.	Title	Length
1.	"eez-eh"	2:59
2.	"beanz"	4:41

== Personnel ==
Kasabian

- Tom Meighan – lead vocals
- Sergio Pizzorno – co-lead vocals, synthesizers, programming, percussion
- Chris Edwards – bass guitar
- Ian Matthews – drums

Additional personnel

- Tim Carter – guitar

== Charts ==
Chart (2014)	Peak position
Belgium (Ultratip Bubbling Under Flanders)	30
Belgium (Ultratip Bubbling Under Wallonia)	29
Ireland (IRMA)	38
Italy (FIMI)	40
Japan Hot 100 (Billboard)	30
Scotland Singles (Official Charts)	11
UK Singles (Official Charts)	22

== Certifications ==
Region	Certification	Certified units/sales
United Kingdom (BPI)	Silver	200,000^{‡}
^{‡} Sales+streaming figures based on certification alone.

== Release history ==
Region	Date	Label	Format
Australia	29 April 2014	Sony Music	Digital download (Version 1)
Austria	29 April 2014	Sony Music	Digital download (Version 1)
Belgium	29 April 2014	Sony Music	Digital download (Version 1)
France	29 April 2014	Sony Music	Digital download (Version 1)
Germany	29 April 2014	Sony Music	Digital download (Version 1)
Ireland	29 April 2014	Sony Music	Digital download (Version 1)
Italy	29 April 2014	Sony Music	Digital download (Version 1)
Netherlands	29 April 2014	Sony Music	Digital download (Version 1)
Norway	29 April 2014	Sony Music	Digital download (Version 1)
Poland	29 April 2014	Sony Music	Digital download (Version 1)
Sweden	29 April 2014	Sony Music	Digital download (Version 1)
United Kingdom	1 June 2014	Sony Music	Digital download (Version 1)
Australia	3 June 2014	Sony Music	Digital download (Version 2)
Italy	3 June 2014	Sony Music	Digital download (Version 2)
United Kingdom	3 June 2014	Sony Music	Digital download (Version 2)
