= Underdog (Kasabian song) =

Single by Kasabian

from the album West Ryder Pauper Lunatic Asylum
- B-side: "Julie & the Moth Man"; "Underdog (Sasha remix)"
- Released: 26 October 2009
- Recorded: 2008
- Genre: Indie rock; psychedelic rock; space rock; electronic rock
- Length: 4:36
- Label: RCA
- Songwriter: Sergio Pizzorno
- Producers: Dan the Automator; Sergio Pizzorno

Kasabian singles chronology
"Where Did All The Love Go?" (2009)	"Underdog" (2009)	"Vlad The Impaler" (2010)

West Ryder Pauper Lunatic Asylum track listing
- 1. "Underdog"; 2. "Where Did All the Love Go?"; 3. "Swarfiga"; 4. "Fast Fuse"; 5. "Take Aim"; 6. "Thick as Thieves"; 7. "West Ryder Silver Bullet"; 8. "Vlad the Impaler"; 9. "Ladies and Gentlemen, Roll the Dice"; 10. "Secret Alphabets"; 11. "Fire"; 12. "Happiness"

"Underdog" is the third single released from the album West Ryder Pauper Lunatic Asylum by English band Kasabian. It peaked at number 32 in the UK Singles Chart on the week after the album's release. Despite this, it became a widely popular song.

== Popular culture use ==
"Underdog" was used in the credits of the 2010 film Takers. Snooker player Mark Selby has used "Underdog" as his walk-on music.

The music featured in the Carlsberg England team talk advertisement for the 2010 World Cup, as did the band themselves. During the 2011 Rugby League Four Nations, an instrumental version of the song was used as music during video referee decisions. The song was played during the fourth episode of the first series of the BBC Three sitcom Mongrels. The song, like many other Kasabian tracks, is also used in at least one episode of BBC Two's Top Gear. It was also used on a highlight video for the 2009 European Grand Prix on the official Formula 1 website.

"Underdog" is currently used as the run out music for Welsh United Rugby Championship side Dragons RFC.

The song was also featured on an episode of The World's Strictest Parents in Australia. "Underdog" has been used by Sony in a commercial for their BRAVIA televisions. The advert also features Real Madrid and Brazilian football player Kaká while he was with his former team AC Milan wearing their home kit.

The track is also included in the 16-track playlist of the 2009 racing simulator Need for Speed: Shift.

The song is part of the soundtrack of mobile car racing game Asphalt 8: Airborne.

"Underdog" also features in the background of a scene in Misfits, season one, episode four.

It was also covered by international superstar Kelly Rowland during her BBC Radio 1 Live Lounge session in 2010.

It was used in the regional competition scene of the 2011 docudrama Soul Surfer, the true story of Bethany Hamilton.

This song is also used by Cancer Research UK's Race for Life campaign, appearing in television and radio advertisements, and played at the start of each event.

"Underdog" was also used as the entrance music for George Groves in his boxing match against Carl Froch at Wembley Stadium.

An instrumental version of the song is featured in Toyota Australia's television commercial that premiered in July 2016.

== Track listing ==
- Digital EP
1. "Underdog" – 4:36
2. "Julie & the Moth Man" – 5:38
3. "Underdog (Sasha remix)" – 10:27

== Personnel ==
- Tom Meighan – lead vocals
- Sergio Pizzorno – guitars, synthesizers, backing vocals
- Chris Edwards – bass
- Ian Matthews – drums
- Jay Mehler – additional guitar

== Music video ==
The music video features a live performance by the band in black and white at the Roundhouse in Chalk Farm, London.

== Chart performance ==
Following the release of Kasabian's album, "Underdog" entered the UK Singles Chart at number 32. However, on the single's physical release in October 2009, "Underdog" only managed to reach number 45, failing to outperform the original peak of number 32. Due to the constant usage of the song in various media, it became their third biggest selling track to date.

Chart (2009)	Peak position
UK Singles (OCC)	32

== Certifications ==
Region	Certification	Certified units/sales
United Kingdom (BPI)	Platinum	600,000^{‡}
^{‡} Sales+streaming figures based on certification alone.
