= Where Did All the Love Go? =

Single by Kasabian

from the album West Ryder Pauper Lunatic Asylum
- B-side: "Vlad the Impaler" (Zane Lowe Remix), "Where Did All the Love Go?" (Burns Remix)
- Released: 10 August 2009
- Genre: Indie rock, psychedelic rock, dance-rock, electronic rock, progressive rock
- Length: 4:18 (album version) 4:11 (music video)
- Label: RCA
- Songwriter: Sergio Pizzorno
- Producers: Dan the Automator, Sergio Pizzorno

Kasabian singles chronology
"Fire" (2009)	"Where Did All the Love Go?" (2009)	"Underdog" (2009)

West Ryder Pauper Lunatic Asylum track listing
- 1. "Underdog"; 2. "Where Did All the Love Go?"; 3. "Swarfiga"; 4. "Fast Fuse"; 5. "Take Aim"; 6. "Thick as Thieves"; 7. "West Ryder Silver Bullet"; 8. "Vlad the Impaler"; 9. "Ladies and Gentlemen, Roll the Dice"; 10. "Secret Alphabets"; 11. "Fire"; 12. "Happiness"

"Where Did All the Love Go?" is a song by English rock band Kasabian and is the second official single from their third album, West Ryder Pauper Lunatic Asylum. It was released on 10 August 2009.

== Music ==
"Where Did All The Love Go" has been described as a psychedelic rock song with a prominent string section. The music video and radio version is edited, with some sections trimmed out including the guitar break before the second verse and the organ before the instrumental break, although the outro is extended to feature a repeat of the chorus instrumental, which is not present on the album version.

== Lyrics ==
Guitarist Sergio Pizzorno explained the song's meaning to New Musical Express stating that "It's sitting at home seeing another kid get stabbed, everyone is scared and going, 'What the fuck is going on?" The song also speaks about the Internet, with Pizzorno elaborating in an interview with The Sun that "Kids today grow up really quickly and there's too much information. News channels, the internet and social networking sites. People aren't leaving their bedrooms and it's just crazy. The things that make you most happy are quite simple. That song is looking for the romantic image of life, when people looked out for each other."

== Music video ==
According to Serge Pizzorno, the song's music video, directed by Charles Mehling, was inspired by Kenneth Anger's films like Scorpio Rising, Busby Berkeley and French cabaret.

== Personnel ==
Kasabian

- Tom Meighan – lead vocals
- Sergio Pizzorno – guitars, synths, backing vocals
- Chris Edwards – bass
- Ian Matthews – drums

Additional personnel

- Rosie Danvers – string direction
- Wired Strings – strings

== Chart performance ==
Following its release in August 2009, "Where Did All the Love Go?" entered the UK Singles Chart at a peak of #30. Although not as successful as the previous single "Fire", this single did prove popular on the radio.

Chart (2009)	Peak Position
Belgium (Ultratip Bubbling Under Flanders)	4
Belgium (Ultratip Bubbling Under Wallonia)	9
UK Singles Chart	30

== Certifications ==
Region	Certification	Certified units/sales
United Kingdom (BPI)	Silver	200,000^{‡}
^{‡} Sales+streaming figures based on certification alone.

== Track listings ==
- 2-Track CD PARADISE64
1. "Where Did All the Love Go?" – 4:18
2. "Vlad the Impaler" (Zane Lowe Remix) - 4:32
- 10" PARADISE65
1. "Where Did All the Love Go?" – 4:18
2. "Where Did All the Love Go?" (Burns Remix) - 6:07
- Digital Download
1. "Where Did All the Love Go?" (Live at Le Live De La Sema) - 4:30
- iTunes Bundle
1. "Where Did All the Love Go?" – 4:18
2. "Vlad the Impaler" (Zane Lowe Remix) - 4:32
3. "Where Did All the Love Go?" (Burns Remix) - 6:07
4. "Take Aim" (Dan the Automator Remix) - 5:17
- 2-Track Radio Promo CD
1. "Where Did All the Love Go?" (Radio Edit) – 4:14
2. "Where Did All the Love Go?" (Instrumental) – 4:26
