= Re-Wired (song) =

Single by Kasabian

from the album Velociraptor!
- Released: 20 October 2011
- Genre: Electronic rock, pop rock, disco
- Length: 4:44
- Label: RCA
- Songwriter: Sergio Pizzorno
- Producer: Dan the Automator

Kasabian singles chronology
"Days Are Forgotten" (2011)	"Re-Wired" (2011)	"Goodbye Kiss" (2012)

Velociraptor! track listing
- 1. "Let's Roll Just Like We Used To"; 2. "Days Are Forgotten"; 3. "Goodbye Kiss"; 4. "La Fée Verte"; 5. "Velociraptor"; 6. "Acid Turkish Bath (Shelter from the Storm)"; 7. "I Hear Voices"; 8. "Re-wired"; 9. "Man of Simple Pleasures"; 10. "Switchblade Smiles"; 11. "Neon Noon"

"Re-Wired" is the second single from Kasabian's fourth album, Velociraptor!. First released digitally, the single has also been released as a limited 10 inch vinyl on 20 November 2011. Only 1,000 copies were made and were quickly sold out in 3 days through pre-orders. A part of the song was used at half time in live Premier League football matches on Sky Sports during the 2011/2012 season, when a small round up of incidents during the match was played before a commercial break.

== Music video ==
The band have released a video for the song, in which they drive various cars, being chased by a black 4x4. At the end they are caught and given a suitcase that glows as gold when opened and they remain speechless. Like the promo video for "Vlad The Impaler", this one also has a more humorous nature. In one scene, they are seen riding a five-seater bike, with Noel Fielding dressed up as Vlad the Impaler.

== Track listing ==
Signed 10"

No.	Title	Length
1.	"Re-Wired"	4:44

iTunes Single

No.	Title	Length
1.	"Re-Wired"	4:44
2.	"Re-Wired (VEVO Presents: Kasabian) [Video]"	4:38
3.	"Velociraptor! (VEVO Presents: Kasabian) [Video]"	3:33

Promo CD

No.	Title	Length
1.	"Re-Wired" (Single edit)	3:40
2.	"Re-Wired" (Instrumental)	3:40

== Personnel ==
Kasabian

- Tom Meighan – lead vocals
- Sergio Pizzorno – guitars, synthesizers, backing vocals
- Chris Edwards – bass
- Ian Matthews – drums

Additional personnel

- Gary Alesbrook – trumpet
- Mat Coleman – trombone
- Andrew Kinsman – saxophone
- London Metropolitan Orchestra – strings

== Commercial performance ==
In its second week of release, the song briefly cracked the Official UK Singles Chart at number 96 before falling off the chart. The main reason was the limited vinyl release, which was not a proper single. It slowly climbed on the Belgium Tip Chart, to 13 in Flanders and 35 in Wallonia.

== Charts ==
Chart (2011)	Peak position
Belgium (Ultratip Bubbling Under Flanders)	13
Belgium (Ultratip Bubbling Under Wallonia)	35
Scotland (OCC)	88
Switzerland Airplay (Schweizer Hitparade)	100
UK Singles (OCC)	96

== Certifications ==
Region	Certification	Certified units/sales
United Kingdom (BPI)	Silver	200,000^{‡}
^{‡} Sales+streaming figures based on certification alone.
