= James Dowdeswell =

British comedian, writer and actor (born 1974)

James Dowdeswell is a British comedian, writer and actor.
