= Fire (Kasabian song) =

2009 single by Kasabian

Single by Kasabian

from the album West Ryder Pauper Lunatic Asylum
- B-side: "Fire" (Richard Fearless Mix)
- Released: 1 June 2009
- Genre: Psychedelic rock
- Length: 4:12
- Label: Columbia; Sony Music UK
- Songwriter: Sergio Pizzorno
- Producers: Dan the Automator; Sergio Pizzorno

Kasabian singles chronology
"Me Plus One" (2007)	"Fire" (2009)	"Where Did All the Love Go?" (2009)

West Ryder Pauper Lunatic Asylum track listing
- 1. "Underdog"; 2. "Where Did All the Love Go?"; 3. "Swarfiga"; 4. "Fast Fuse"; 5. "Take Aim"; 6. "Thick as Thieves"; 7. "West Ryder Silver Bullet"; 8. "Vlad the Impaler"; 9. "Ladies and Gentlemen, Roll the Dice"; 10. "Secret Alphabets"; 11. "Fire"; 12. "Happiness"

"Fire" is a song by English rock band Kasabian and is the lead single from their third album, West Ryder Pauper Lunatic Asylum. It was released 1 June 2009. On the week of its release, it debuted at number 3 on the UK Singles Chart, making it their first UK top-three entry and their highest-charting single to date as well as their fourth UK top-ten single. "Fire" also debuted at number one in Scotland, becoming Kasabian's highest-charting single there as well. On the Australian ARIA Singles Chart, it debuted at number 44 peaked at number 41.

The song was featured in Callaway's 2010 Super Bowl commercial. The song was the official song of the Premier League from the 2010–11 season up to the 2012–13 season. This meant the song (different segments of it) was present in most of the BPL Shows produced by Premier League Productions which was broadcast around the world. A purported remix of the song is the theme tune of Kick Off, the show produced by PL Productions before the main Matchday Live coverage. The song is also used by the band's home town team, Leicester City as goal music. It is also featured in the F1 2010 video game and the closing montage of BBC's Match of the Day for the 2015–16 Premier League season where the hometown Leicester City won the Premier League, featuring their performance at the 2014 Glastonbury Festival.

In 2011, NME placed it at number 65 on its list "150 Best Tracks of the Past 15 Years".

== Background ==
One morning, guitarist Serge Pizzorno was improvising in the studio and played the slow guitar rhythm heard in the verse. He suggested singer Tom Meighan sing the verses like Elvis. Pizzorno had another idea for a groovier song which wound up being the chorus and stitched it together with the Elvis part "for a laugh", then realized it sounded great. Pizzorno described it as "like a band being onstage and then another band sort of elbowing them off stage to play the chorus".

Meighan said the song is "about bondage and being whipped and being seduced", while Pizzorno said it is about unusual, special events such as rolling two sixes in dice, or kicking a ball through a hole.

== Chart performance ==
Following its release in June 2009, "Fire" managed to peak at number three on the UK Singles Chart and number one on the Scottish Singles Chart, making it Kasabian's most successful song to date in both countries. The song also managed to enter the Australian ARIA Singles Chart at number 44 before moving up to a new peak of number 41 the following week. In Ireland, the song peaked at number 31, and in Belgium, the song was a moderate success, charting on the Ultratip charts in Flanders and Wallonia.

== Music video ==
The video for "Fire" was directed by British director W.I.Z. and portrays a bank robbery gone wrong, with guitars taking the place of firearms. Near the end of the video, when Sergio Pizzorno throws the stolen goods against the wall, the viewer can see that what they have stolen is actually sheets of music. The video is very similar to Judas Priest's "Breaking the Law".

The music video was filmed on location Cape Town, South Africa.

== Track listings ==
UK 10-inch single (PARADISE 55)

A. "Fire"
B. "Fire" (Richard Fearless Mix)

European and Australian CD single (PARADISE54)

1. "Fire" – 4:11
2. "Runaway" (live from The Little Noise Sessions) – 4:08

Digital download

1. "Fire" – 4:11

Digital EP

1. "Fire" – 4:12
2. "Runaway" (live) – 4:09
3. "Road Kill Cafe" – 2:39

== Personnel ==
- Tom Meighan – vocals
- Sergio Pizzorno – vocals, guitar, synths
- Chris Edwards – bass
- Ian Matthews – drums, percussion, vibraslap

== Charts ==
=== Weekly charts ===
Chart (2009)	Peak position
Australia (ARIA)	41
Belgium (Ultratip Bubbling Under Flanders)	3
Belgium (Ultratip Bubbling Under Wallonia)	20
Czech Republic Modern Rock (IFPI)	12
Europe (European Hot 100)	10
Ireland (IRMA)	38
Scottish Singles Sales (Official Charts)	1
UK Singles (Official Charts)	3

=== Year-end charts ===
Chart (2009)	Position
UK Singles (OCC)	81

== Certifications ==
Region	Certification	Certified units/sales
Australia (ARIA)	Gold	35,000^{‡}
New Zealand (RMNZ)	Gold	15,000^{‡}
United Kingdom (BPI)	3× Platinum	1,800,000^{‡}
^{‡} Sales+streaming figures based on certification alone.
