= Glastonbury Festival 2014 =

2014 festival in Glastonbury

- Date: 25 June 2014 – 29 June 2014
- Locations: Worthy Farm, Pilton, Somerset, UK
- Previous event: Glastonbury Festival 2013
- Next event: Glastonbury Festival 2015
- Website: www.glastonburyfestivals.co.uk

The 2014 Glastonbury Festival of Contemporary Performing Arts was held between 25 and 29 June 2014.

== Ticket sales ==
Initially a small selection of tickets were sold for people who wished to travel by coach. A few days later the standard tickets were released where ticket sales sold out in record time of one hour and 27 minutes. Sofirula were the first shop that sold all the official merchandising.

== Line-up ==
On 19 December 2013, it was announced that Arcade Fire would headline the Pyramid Stage on Friday 27 June 2014. Kasabian will headline on Sunday 29 June. In early March 2014, Glastonbury announced that Dolly Parton would perform at the festival via their Facebook page, although didn't confirm if she would be headlining. Other acts that self-confirmed were Disclosure (who will play the Other Stage on the Friday), Blondie, Lily Allen and Foxes. The artist headlining on Saturday was listed as special guests for legal reasons. Metallica were later announced as the special guests.

As of 30 April 2014, the following artists have been announced to perform:

- Arcade Fire (headline act)
- Metallica (headline act)
- Kasabian (headline act)
- Dolly Parton
- Lana Del Rey
- Jack White
- St. Vincent
- Elbow
- The Black Keys
- Robert Plant and the Sensational Space Shifters
- Lily Allen
- Skrillex
- Pixies
- Massive Attack
- Disclosure
- Paolo Nutini
- Manic Street Preachers
- M.I.A.
- Rudimental
- Bryan Ferry
- Richie Hawtin
- Ed Sheeran
- De La Soul
- Goldfrapp
- Caro Emerald
- London Grammar
- MGMT
- Jake Bugg
- Jurassic 5
- Dexys
- Above & Beyond
- The 1975
- Bonobo
- Kelis
- Blondie
- Warpaint
- The Wailers
- Wilko Johnson
- James Blake
- Gorgon City
- Metronomy
- Tinariwen
- Chvrches
- Little Dragon
- Seun Kuti & Egypt 80
- Kodaline
- Interpol
- Foster the People
- Mogwai
- Royal Blood
- John Grant
- Annie Mac Lil Louis
- Daptone Super Soul Revue
- John Newman
- Chromeo
- Rodrigo y Gabriela
- Midlake
- Angel Haze
- Four Tet
- ESG
- Sun Ra Arkestra
- François Kevorkian
- Parquet Courts
- Danny Brown
- Crystal Fighters
- Nitin Sawhney
- DJ Pierre
- Toumani & Sidiki Diabaté
- Chance The Rapper
- MNEK
- Temples
- Phosphorescent
- Connan Mockasin
- Public Service Broadcasting
- Courtney Barnett
- Wolf Alice
- Radiophonic Workshop
- Suzanne Vega
- Tune-Yards
- Jagwar Ma
- Eats Everything
- Jamie xx
- Ms. Dynamite
- Breach
- Chlöe Howl
- Troker
- Aquilo
