= West Ryder Pauper Lunatic Asylum =

Studio album by Kasabian
- Released: 5 June 2009
- Recorded: Orangutan Studios (Greensboro, North Carolina); E-Land Mig Studios (Earl Shilton, Leicestershire); Lookout Studios (San Francisco, California)
- Genres: Indie rock; psychedelic rock; space rock; experimental rock
- Length: 51:59
- Labels: RCA; Paradise
- Producers: Dan the Automator; Sergio Pizzorno

Kasabian chronology
Empire (2006)	West Ryder Pauper Lunatic Asylum (2009)	Velociraptor! (2011)

Singles from West Ryder Pauper Lunatic Asylum
- 1. "Fire" Released: 1 June 2009; 2. "Where Did All the Love Go?" Released: 17 August 2009; 3. "Underdog" Released: 26 October 2009; 4. "Vlad the Impaler" Released: 14 February 2010

West Ryder Pauper Lunatic Asylum is the third studio album by British indie rock band Kasabian, which was released on 5 June 2009. It was the band's first album not to feature Christopher Karloff, the band's lead guitarist and songwriter who departed during the writing stages of Empire (2006). Rhythm guitarist Sergio Pizzorno became lead songwriter and co-producer for the band. It is also their first album to feature guitar contributions from Tim Carter, who would become the band's touring guitarist in 2013 and a full-fledged member of the band in 2021.

West Ryder Pauper Lunatic Asylum debuted at number one in the United Kingdom, giving Kasabian their second number-one album in that country, and spawned four singles: "Fire", "Where Did All the Love Go?", "Underdog" and "Vlad the Impaler". It also charted within the top 40 in countries like Australia, France, Ireland and New Zealand.

The album was nominated for the 2009 Mercury Prize. In October 2009, it was voted the best album of the year by Q Magazine.

== Composition and music ==
The West Riding Pauper Lunatic Asylum was a mental institution built in West Yorkshire, England in 1818. Sergio Pizzorno further explained the choice of album title: "The album isn't about the place, I just first heard about it on a TV documentary, and the words just struck me. I love the way it looked and the feeling it evokes. Apparently, it was one of the first for the poor, before that it was mainly rich people who got treatment." The album cover depicts the band "getting dressed up for a party at the asylum, looking in the mirror at the costumes". Inspiration for the cover originated from the artwork of Amon Düül II's album Made in Germany. In an interview with T4, the band said that each track is meant to represent an inmate within the asylum.

=== Tracks ===
The opening track "Underdog" was suggested by lead vocalist Tom Meighan to be the opening track, and consists of a jagged riff and synth breakdowns. The song has also seen wide usage in popular culture, including a commercial for BRAVIA's television products and car racing video games Need for Speed: Shift and Asphalt 8: Airborne. "Where Did All The Love Go?" has been described as a psychedelic rock song with a prominent string section, and it segues into the instrumental track "Swarfiga", which was described as krautrock and named after the industrial hand cleaning product Swarfega. "Fast Fuse" has been branded as boasting an 'electronic garage' sound drawing comparisons to Primal Scream, The Rolling Stones and T. Rex. "Take Aim" is the first song on the album with Pizzorno in lead vocals, and demonstrates his diverse guitar work, along with a Mexican funeral march-inspired opening. "Thick as Thieves" has been characterised as an "acoustic stomp" and has been compared to "People Are Strange" by The Doors; the band would often incorporate a snippet of this track in live performances of the song.

Opening with a spoken word sample from the 1983 film Sans Soleil, "West Ryder Silver Bullet" is a duet featuring actress Rosario Dawson, detailing "two lovers racing towards the sunset- a total crazed acid vibe." "Vlad The Impaler" features "big, billowing bass and brusque organ" and features a reference to actor Heath Ledger, who died shortly after the song was written. "Ladies And Gentlemen, Roll The Dice" has been categorised as a "psychedelia-tinged ballad" with a "slow motion Western haunt". The Middle Eastern-inspired "Secret Alphabets" incorporates "fills of oud-like guitar over a camel-gait groove" and samples Helmut Zacharias' interpretation of "Sakura Sakura", therefore crediting him as an additional writer. Lead single and penultimate track "Fire" combines two different, largely distinct grooves, consisting of an acoustic, "anxious, minimalist shuffle" in the verse and a "massive techno" and "dance-rock" chorus as well as Meighan's Elvis-inspired vocals. The closing track "Happiness" is a "gospel-assisted" ballad sung by Pizzorno.

== Critical reception ==
Professional ratings
Aggregate scores
Source	Rating
Metacritic	68/100
Review scores
Source	Rating
AllMusic	3/5 stars
Drowned in Sound	5/10
The Guardian	4/5 stars
The Independent	4/5 stars
NME	8/10
Pitchfork	4.9/10
PopMatters	3/10 stars
Rolling Stone	2.5/5 stars
Spin	2.5/5 stars
Uncut	5/5 stars

West Ryder Pauper Lunatic Asylum received positive reviews from music critics. At Metacritic, which assigns a normalised rating out of 100 to reviews from mainstream critics, the album received an average score of 68, based on 15 reviews.

Adam Sweeting of Uncut praised the band for putting a lot more depth into their sound while delivering the songs with a dark undertone to them, calling it "A world away from their ladrock roots, you might say." Dave Simpson of The Guardian also gave praise to the band's newfound demented sound, noting that their trademark tracks are more melodic and utilize different instrumentals, concluding that "the resulting epic is barmy and beautiful, suggesting that while Kasabian's amps go up to 11, they can also sound good when they're turned down to four." Hamish MacBain of NME praised the album's mishmash of psychedelic-infused tracks resembling that of The Rolling Stones' Their Satanic Majesties Request, calling it "a shambling, splattered, ultimately much more enduring mess that will make sense if you just hang on in there."

Andrew Leahey of AllMusic commended the band for improving on their previous effort with a psychedelic sense and horror-like atmosphere mixed with their usual dance-rock sound, calling it "an interesting, unexpected piece of work, devoid of a militantly commercial single like Empire's self-titled track, and lacking the shaggy Madchester vibes that Christopher Karloff brought to 2004's Kasabian." While praising tracks like "Fast Fuse" and "Ladies and Gentlemen (Roll the Dice)" for deviating away from their Madchester sound into more '60s sounding bands like the Stones and T. Rex, Dom Gourlay of Drowned in Sound criticized the album for carrying half thought-out tracks with production that apes the sounds of other well-known Britpop bands, saying that it "suffers in the most part for being so predictable." Bill Stewart of PopMatters felt the album was bogged down by the band's pretentious, instrumental choices and studio handling, saying that "All the gimmicky studio effects in the world can't mask the fact that this album is likely to be one of the most hollow you'll hear all year."

In 2011, West Ryder Pauper Lunatic Asylum was ranked at number 35 in Q's readers poll of the "250 Best Albums of the Last 25 Years". Q wrote that the group "finally shook off the lad-rock tag and delivered a bold concept album infused with a rogeusih wit. Here, they upgraded the rock swagger of Empire with pounding electro-metal, Krautrock, Kinks-y psychedelia and the mariachi stomp of 'Fire': an anthem to light up any festival."

== Singles and videos ==
- "Fast Fuse" – Released on 2 October 2007 as a bootleg single. Although not being the first official single from the album it was the first material released from it, receiving airplay on Xfm, Absolute Radio and being posted on YouTube. Members of Kasabian's fan club at the time could buy the song on a one sided 10". Despite receiving some airplay and a limited release it never had a video. It was also used on the video game FIFA 09. As well as this, the song was used as the theme tune for Russell Howard's Good News, broadcast on BBC Two (previously BBC Three) in the UK.
- "Vlad the Impaler" – Released as a free single on 31 March 2009 to 3 April 2009. The song only got minor airplay. The song was released with a video featuring Noel Fielding as Vlad. The video was directed by Richard Ayoade. It was later released on 14 February 2010 with a second music video to accompany it as the fourth official single.
- "Fire" – Released as the first official single on 1 June and reached number 3 on the UK Singles Chart.
- "Underdog" – Released on 26 October 2009 and reached number 32 in the UK Singles Chart.
- "Where Did All the Love Go?" – Released on 17 August 2009, the song was the third official single charting at 30 in the UK charts. A music video has been released to support the single.

== Track listing ==
All tracks are written by Sergio Pizzorno, except where noted.

No.	Title	Length
1.	"Underdog"	4:37
2.	"Where Did All the Love Go?"	4:17
3.	"Swarfiga"	2:18
4.	"Fast Fuse"	4:10
5.	"Take Aim"	5:23
6.	"Thick as Thieves"	3:06
7.	"West Ryder Silver Bullet"	5:15
8.	"Vlad the Impaler"	4:44
9.	"Ladies and Gentlemen, Roll the Dice"	3:33
10.	"Secret Alphabets" (Pizzorno, Helmut Zacharias)	5:07
11.	"Fire"	4:13
12.	"Happiness"	5:16

Japan Only Bonus Tracks
No.	Title	Length
13.	"Runaway" (Live)	4:09
14.	"Cunny Grope Lane"	3:12
15.	"Road Kill Café"	2:39

Japan Only Bonus CD
No.	Title	Length
1.	"Shoot the Runner" (Live at iTunes Festival)
2.	"Empire" (Live at iTunes Festival)
3.	"Stuntman" (Live at iTunes Festival)
4.	"The Doberman" (Live at iTunes Festival)
5.	"Club Foot" (Live at iTunes Festival)
6.	"L.S.F. (Lost Souls Forever)" (Live at iTunes Festival)

Special Edition Bonus DVD
No.	Title	Length
1.	"Processed Beats" (Live from the Little Noise Sessions)	4:05
2.	"Black Whistler" (Live from the Little Noise Sessions)	4:00
3.	"I.D." (Live from the Little Noise Sessions)	3:59
4.	"Me Plus One" (Live from the Little Noise Sessions)	3:06
5.	"The Doberman" (Live from the Little Noise Sessions)	5:12
6.	"Runaway" (Live from the Little Noise Sessions)	3:45
7.	"Thick as Thieves" (Live from the Royal Albert Hall for Teenage Cancer Trust)	3:26
8.	"Fast Fuse" (Live from the Royal Albert Hall for Teenage Cancer Trust)	4:06
9.	"Club Foot" (Live from the Royal Albert Hall for Teenage Cancer Trust)	4:44
10.	"L.S.F. (Lost Souls Forever)" (Live from the Royal Albert Hall for Teenage Cancer Trust)	7:21
11.	"Vlad the Impaler" (Video)
12.	"Vlad the Impaler" (Making of)
13.	"Fire" (Music Film)

Australian Tour Edition Bonus Tracks
No.	Title	Length
13.	"Julie & The Moth Man"
14.	"Where Did All the Love Go?" (Burns Remix)
15.	"Vlad the Impaler" (Zane Lowe Remix)
16.	"Take Aim" (Dan the Automator Remix)

Australian Tour Edition Bonus DVD
No.	Title	Length
1.	"Underdog" (Live at T4)
2.	"Where Did All the Love Go?" (Live at T4)
3.	"Thick as Thieves" (Live at T4)
4.	"Fire" (Live at T4)
5.	"Club Foot" (Live at T4)
6.	"Empire" (Live at T4)
7.	"Vlad the Impaler" (Video)
8.	"Underdog" (Video – International Version)
9.	"Fire" (Video)
10.	"Where Did All the Love Go?" (Video)
11.	"Underdog" (Video – UK Version)

== Personnel ==
Kasabian

- Tom Meighan – lead vocals (all tracks except "Swarfiga", "Take Aim", "Secret Alphabets" and "Happiness"), scream on "Swarfiga"
- Sergio Pizzorno – lead and rhythm guitar, synths, programming, backing vocals, lead vocals on "Take Aim", "Secret Alphabets" and "Happiness"
- Chris Edwards – bass guitar
- Ian Matthews – drums

Additional personnel

- Dan the Automator – additional programming
- Jay Mehler – additional guitar on "Underdog", "Ladies and Gentlemen (Roll the Dice)" and "Happiness"
- Tim Carter – additional guitar, keyboards and percussion
- Daniel Ralph Martin – additional guitar on "Fast Fuse" and piano on "Happiness"
- Rosario Dawson – co-lead vocals on "West Ryder Silver Bullet"
- Ben Kealey – additional keyboards on "Ladies and Gentlemen (Roll the Dice)"
- Rosie Danvers – strings direction
- Wired Strings – strings on "Where Did All the Love Go?", "Take Aim", "West Ryder Silver Bullet" & "Secret Alphabets"

== Charts and certifications ==
=== Weekly charts ===
Chart (2009)	Peak position
Australian Albums (ARIA)	11
Austrian Albums (Ö3 Austria)	56
Dutch Albums (Album Top 100)	85
French Albums (SNEP)	30
Irish Albums (IRMA)	4
Japanese Albums (Oricon)	11
New Zealand Albums (RMNZ)	23
Scottish Albums (Official Charts)	2
Swiss Albums (Schweizer Hitparade)	27
UK Albums (Official Charts)	1
UK Album Downloads (Official Charts)	1
US Billboard 200	126
US Independent Albums (Billboard)	26
US Top Rock Albums (Billboard)	49

=== Year-end charts ===
Chart (2009)	Position
UK Albums (OCC)	19
Chart (2010)	Position
UK Albums (OCC)	70

=== Certifications ===
Certifications for West Ryder Pauper Lunatic Asylum
Region	Certification	Certified units/sales
Australia (ARIA)	Gold	35,000^{^}
Ireland (IRMA)	Platinum	15,000^{^}
United Kingdom (BPI)	3× Platinum	803,000
^{^} Shipments figures based on certification alone.
