= Fast Fuse =

EP by Kasabian
- Released: 2 October 2007
- Length: 7:13

Kasabian EP chronology
Fast Fuse (2007)	West Ryder (2009)

Fast Fuse is an EP by rock band Kasabian and was released to a select market on 2 October 2007. The track "Take Aim" was slated for inclusion on the EP but was eventually omitted. All three tracks went on to be included on their third studio album, West Ryder Pauper Lunatic Asylum. Welsh rock band FastFuse a.k.a. fruit flies (with bassist Mitchell) took name and inspiration from the title of this EP.

== Track listing ==
1. "Fast Fuse" – 4:06
2. "Thick as Thieves" – 3:07

Fast Fuse was also featured in FIFA 09, due to the early-released EP, which came out before the album West Ryder Pauper Lunatic Asylum. It also featured as the theme song for the WWE pay per view Cyber Sunday 2007. The song can also be heard in a Richard Hammond's Blast Lab advert and an instrumental version is used as the theme tune for Russell Howard's Good News.

Vocalist Tom Meighan told The Sun that the band see "Fast Fuse" as their very own Quentin Tarantino soundtrack with its Kraut-rock bass and furious vocals. He said: "It's a Tarantino take on the 21st Century. There are a lot of angry men out there and Serge's lyrics show what they're saying."

Fast Fuse is also the menu music in International Cricket 2010 by Codemasters.

The versions of these two songs are different from the versions on West Ryder Pauper Lunatic Asylum.
