= Kasabian discography =

Discograpy of English rock band Kasabian

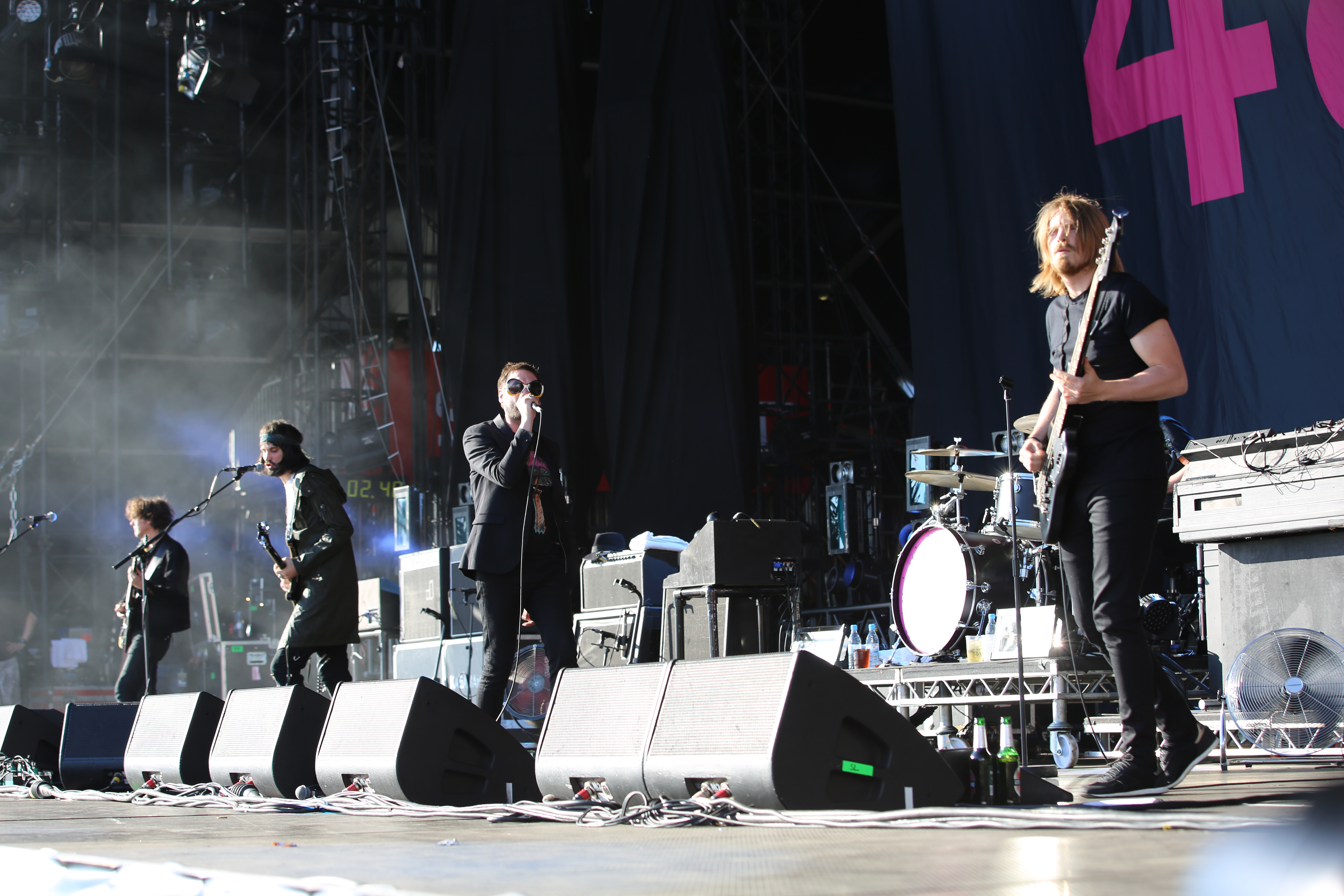
- Kasabian performing live at Rock am Ring in 2014
- Studio albums: 9
- Extended plays: 6
- Live albums: 2
- Compilation albums: 4
- Singles: 38
- Music videos: 31

The discography of the English indie rock band Kasabian consists of nine studio albums, two live albums, six extended plays, 38 singles and 31 music videos. The nine studio albums are Kasabian (2004), Empire (2006), West Ryder Pauper Lunatic Asylum (2009), Velociraptor! (2011), 48:13 (2014), For Crying Out Loud (2017), The Alchemist's Euphoria (2022), Happenings (2024), and Act III (2026).

Eight of their nine studio albums have reached number one on the UK Albums Chart, with their self-titled debut peaking at number 4.

== Albums ==
=== Studio albums ===
List of albums, with selected chart positions, sales, and certifications
Title	Details	Peak chart positions										Sales	Certifications
Title	Details	UK	AUS	FRA	GER	IRE	ITA	JPN	NLD	SWI	US	Sales	Certifications
Kasabian	Released: 6 September 2004; Label: RCA (#PARADISE16), Arista; Formats: CD, DualDisc, 2×10", digital download	4	—	70	—	22	56	17	72	—	94	UK: 1,114,655	BPI: 3× Platinum; RIAJ: Gold
Empire	Released: 28 August 2006; Label: Columbia (#PARADISE37), RCA, Sony; Formats: CD, CD/DVD, 2×10", digital download	1	67	56	68	3	40	8	— (Note: Empire did not enter the Netherlands' Album Top 100 but peaked on the Netherlands' Alternative Albums Chart at number 29.)	47	114	UK: 845,440	BPI: 2× Platinum; ARIA: Gold; IRMA: Platinum
West Ryder Pauper Lunatic Asylum	Released: 8 June 2009; Label: Columbia (#88697518311), RCA, Sony; Formats: CD, CD/DVD, 2×10", digital download	1	11	30	53	4	—	11	85	27	126	UK: 996,640	BPI: 3× Platinum; ARIA: Gold; IRMA: Platinum
Velociraptor!	Released: 19 September 2011; Label: Columbia, Sony; Formats: CD, CD/DVD, 2×10", digital download	1	8	14	22	2	11	10	37	10	—	UK: 683,533	BPI: 2× Platinum; FIMI: Gold
48:13	Released: 6 June 2014; Label: Columbia, Sony, Harvest; Formats: CD, 2×10", digital download	1	11	46	26	2	6	21	28	11	— (Note: 48:13 did not enter the US Billboard 200, but peaked at number 155 on the US Billboard Current Album Sales Chart.)	UK: 525,215	BPI: Platinum
For Crying Out Loud	Released: 5 May 2017; Label: Sony; Formats: CD, 2CDs, LP, cassette, digital download	1	21	42	27	2	7	17	35	12	—	UK: 223,022	BPI: Gold
The Alchemist's Euphoria	Released: 12 August 2022; Label: Sony; Formats: CD, LP, cassette, digital download, streaming	1	— (Note: The Alchemist's Euphoria did not enter the ARIA Albums Chart, but peaked at number 32 on the ARIA Digital Album Chart.)	— (Note: The Alchemist's Euphoria did not enter the French Album Top 200, but peaked at number 53 on the French Top Album Physiques chart.)	63	80	—	69	—	26	—	UK: 39,068	
Happenings	Released: 5 July 2024; Label: Sony; Formats: Digital download, streaming	1	—	—	—	—	—	—	—	90	—	UK: 35,124	
Act III	Released: 4 September 2026; Label: Sony; Formats: Digital download	1	—	— (Note: Act III did not enter the French Album Top 200, but peaked at number 60 on the French Top Album Physiques chart.)	—	—	—	—	—	—	—		
"—" denotes album that did not chart or was not released.

=== Live albums ===
List of live albums, with selected chart positions
Title	Details	Peak chart positions	
Title	Details	UK Vid.	JPN DVD
Live from Brixton Academy	Released: 4 July 2005; Label: Columbia (PARADISE33); Format: Digital download	—	—
Live!	Released: 25 July 2012; Label: Eagle; Format: CD/DVD, Blu-ray Disc	3	41
"—" denotes album that did not chart or was not released.

=== Compilation albums ===
Title	Details	Peak chart positions		Sales	Certifications	Notes
Title	Details	UK	SCO	Sales	Certifications	Notes
Kasabian: The Albums	Released: 14 June 2010; Label: Columbia (#88697736672); Format: CD, digital download	22	7	UK: 107,122	BPI: Silver	A box set containing Kasabian, Empire and West Ryder Pauper Lunatic Asylum.
Empire/West Ryder Pauper Lunatic Asylum	Released: 16 November 2011; Label: Sony Music; Format: CD, digital download	—	—	UK: 15,899		A box set containing Empire and West Ryder Pauper Lunatic Asylum.
Kasabian/Empire	Released: 18 March 2013; Label: Sony Music, Columbia; Format: CD, digital download	174	78	UK: 23,402		A box set containing Kasabian and Empire.
West Ryder Pauper Lunatic Asylum /Velociraptor!	Released: 29 August 2014; Label: Sony Music, Columbia; Format: CD, digital download	—	—	UK: 116,989		A box set containing West Ryder Pauper Lunatic Asylum and Velociraptor!.
"—" denotes album that did not chart or was not released.

== Extended plays ==
Title	Details	Peak chart positions		
Title	Details	UK Down.	UK Phys.	JPN
Empire EP	Released: 23 August 2006; Label: BMG Japan; Format: CD (Japan only)	—	—	104
iTunes Live: London Festival '07	Released: 6 August 2007; Label: BMG; Format: Digital download	—	—	—
Fast Fuse	Released: 2 October 2007; Label: RCA (PARADISE51); Format: 10"	—	28	—
Discover Kasabian	Released: 25 July 2008; Label: Sony Music; Format: Digital download (Europe only)	—	—	—
West Ryder	Released: 18 May 2009; Label: Sony Music Germany; Format: CD (Germany only)	—	—	—
iTunes Live: London Festival '09	Released: 27 July 2009; Label: Sony BMG; Format: Digital download	8	—	—
iTunes Festival: London 2011	Released: 26 July 2011; Label: Sony BMG; Format: Digital download	10	—	—
"—" denotes album that did not chart or was not released.

== Singles ==
Title	Year	Peak chart positions										Certifications	Album
Title	Year	UK	AUS	AUT	BEL (WA)	CZR	IRE	ITA	JPN	NLD	US Alt.	Certifications	Album
"Processed Beats" (demo)	2003	—	—	—	—	—	—	—	—	—	—		Non-album single
"Reason Is Treason"	2004	—	—	—	—	—	—	—	—	—	—		Kasabian
"Club Foot"	2004	19	— (Note: "Club Foot" did not enter the Australian ARIA Singles Chart but peaked at number 17 on the ARIA Hitseekers Chart.)	—	—	—	—	—	—	—	27	BPI: Platinum	Kasabian
"L.S.F. (Lost Souls Forever)"	2004	10	—	—	—	—	—	17	—	88	32	BPI: Gold	Kasabian
"Processed Beats"	2004	17	—	—	—	—	—	—	—	30	—		Kasabian
"Cutt Off"	2005	8	—	—	—	—	—	—	—	—	—		Kasabian
"Empire"	2006	9	—	—	—	—	32	—	— (Note: "Empire" did not enter the Billboard Japan Hot 100 chart, but peaked at number 104 on the Oricon Singles Chart.)	—	—	BPI: Silver	Empire
"Shoot the Runner"	2006	17	—	—	—	—	—	—	—	—	—	BPI: Gold	Empire
"Me Plus One"	2007	22	—	—	—	—	—	—	—	—	—		Empire
"Fire"	2009	3	41	—	— (Note: "Fire" did not enter the Wallonie Ultratop 50, but peaked at number 20 on the Wallonie Ultratip chart.)	—	31	—	53	—	—	BPI: 3× Platinum; ARIA: Gold	West Ryder Pauper; Lunatic Asylum
"Where Did All the Love Go?"	2009	30	— (Note: "Where Did All the Love Go?" did not enter the ARIA Singles Chart, but peaked at number 100 on the Australian Music Report chart.)	—	— (Note: "Where Did All the Love Go?" did not enter the Wallonie Ultratop 50, but peaked at number nine on the Wallonie Ultratip chart.)	—	—	—	—	—	—	BPI: Silver	West Ryder Pauper; Lunatic Asylum
"Underdog"	2009	32	—	45	—	—	45	—	17	—	—	BPI: Platinum	West Ryder Pauper; Lunatic Asylum
"Vlad the Impaler"	2010	114	—	—	—	—	—	—	—	—	—		West Ryder Pauper; Lunatic Asylum
"Days Are Forgotten"	2011	28	—	—	45	—	—	31	10	—	—	BPI: Silver	Velociraptor!
"Re-Wired"	2011	96	—	—	— (Note: "Re-Wired" did not enter the Wallonie Ultratop 50, but peaked at number 35 on the Wallonie Ultratip chart.)	—	—	—	—	—	—	BPI: Silver	Velociraptor!
"Goodbye Kiss"	2012	76	—	—	— (Note: "Goodbye Kiss" did not enter the Wallonie Ultratop 50, but peaked at number 29 on the Wallonie Ultratip chart.)	—	—	9	—	—	—	FIMI: Platinum	Velociraptor!
"Man of Simple Pleasures"	2012	— (Note: "Man of Simple Pleasures" did not enter the UK Official Singles Chart Top 100 but peaked at number 3 on the Official Physical Singles Chart Top 100.)	—	—	— (Note: "Man of Simple Pleasures" did not enter the Wallonie Ultratop 50, but peaked at number 24 on the Wallonie Ultratip chart.)	—	—	86	—	—	—		Velociraptor!
"Eez-eh"	2014	22	—	—	— (Note: "Eez-eh" did not enter the Wallonie Ultratop 50, but peaked at number 29 on the Wallonie Ultratip chart.)	—	38	40	30	—	—	BPI: Silver	48:13
"Bumblebeee"	2014	165	—	—	—	—	—	—	—	—	—		48:13
"Bow"	2014	—	—	—	—	—	—	—	—	—	—		48:13
"Stevie"	2014	— (Note: "Stevie" did not enter the UK Official Singles Chart Top 100 but peaked at number 6 on the Official Physical Singles Chart Top 100.)	—	—	—	—	—	—	—	—	—	BPI: Silver	48:13
"You're in Love with a Psycho"	2017	62	—	—	— (Note: "You're in Love with a Psycho" did not enter the Wallonie Ultratop 50, but peaked at number 24 on the Wallonie Ultratip chart.)	—	—	99	—	—	—	BPI: Platinum	For Crying Out Loud
"Comeback Kid"	2017	— (Note: "Comeback Kid" did not enter the UK Official Singles Chart Top 100 but peaked at number 84 on the Official UK Singles Sales Chart.)	—	—	—	—	—	—	—	—	—		For Crying Out Loud
"Are You Looking for Action?"	2017	—	—	—	—	—	—	—	—	—	—		For Crying Out Loud
"Ill Ray (The King)"	2017	—	—	—	— (Note: "Ill Ray (The King)" did not enter the Wallonie Ultratop 50, but peaked at number 22 on the Wallonie Ultratip chart.)	—	—	—	—	—	—	BPI: Silver	For Crying Out Loud
"Bless This Acid House"	2017	—	—	—	— (Note: "Bless This Acid House" did not enter the Wallonie Ultratop 50, but charted as an "extra tip" on the Wallonie Ultratip chart.)	—	—	—	—	—	—		For Crying Out Loud
"Alygatyr"	2021	— (Note: "Alygatyr" did not enter the UK Singles Chart, but peaked at number 96 on the UK Singles Downloads Chart.)	—	—	—	—	—	—	—	—	—		The Alchemist's Euphoria
"Scriptvre"	2022	— (Note: "Scriptvre" did not enter the UK Singles Chart, but peaked at number 91 on the Official UK Singles Sales Chart.)	—	—	—	—	—	—	—	—	—		The Alchemist's Euphoria
"Chemicals"	2022	—	—	—	—	—	—	—	—	—	—		The Alchemist's Euphoria
"The Wall"	2022	— (Note: "The Wall" did not enter the UK Singles Chart, but peaked at number 91 on the Official UK Singles Sales Chart.)	—	—	—	—	—	—	—	—	—		The Alchemist's Euphoria
"Strictly Old Skool"	2022	—	—	—	—	—	—	—	—	—	—		The Alchemist's Euphoria
"Rocket Fuel" (featuring The Prodigy)	2023	— (Note: "Rocket Fuel" did not enter the UK Singles Chart, but peaked at number 15 on the Official UK Singles Sales Chart.)	—	—	—	—	—	—	—	—	—		The Alchemist's Euphoria
"Algorithms"	2023	—	—	—	—	—	—	—	—	—	—		Happenings
"Call"	2024	—	—	—	—	—	—	—	—	—	—		Happenings
"Coming Back to Me Good"	2024	—	—	—	—	14	—	—	— (Note: "Coming Back To Me Good" did not enter the Billboard Japan Hot 100 chart, but peaked at number 20 on the Billboard Japan Hot Overseas chart.)	—	—		Happenings
"Darkest Lullaby"	2024	—	—	—	—	—	—	—	—	—	—		Happenings
“Hippie Sunshine”	2025	—	—	—	—	—	—	—	—	—	—		Act III
“Release the Pressure” (with Calvin Harris)	2026	37	—	—	—	30	—	—	—	—	—		TBA
“Great Pretender”	2026	—	—	—	—	—	—	—	— (Note: "Great Pretender" did not enter the Billboard Japan Hot 100 chart, but peaked at number 19 on the Billboard Japan Hot Overseas chart.)	—	—		Act III
“Superpowers”	2026	—	—	—	—	—	—	—	—	—	—		Act III
“Nothing Better Than This ”	2026	—	—	—	—	—	—	—	—	—	—		Act III
"—" denotes a release that did not chart or was not issued in that region.

=== Promotional singles ===
Title	Year	Peak chart positions				Album
Title	Year	UK	UK Phys	UK Vinyl	POL	Album
"Ovary Stripe"	2004	—	—	—	—	Non-album singles
"Heroes"	2006	—	—	—	—	Non-album singles
"Fast Fuse"	2009	156	28	18	—	West Ryder Pauper Lunatic Asylum
"Switchblade Smiles"	2011	186	—	—	36	Velociraptor!
"Velociraptor!"	2012	—	—	—	—	Velociraptor!
"—" denotes a release that did not chart or was not issued in that region.

== Other charted songs ==
Title	Year	Peak chart positions						Album
Title	Year	UK	BEL (FL) Tip	CIS	CZR	POL	SCO	Album
"Thick as Thieves"	2009	—	—	—	—	48	—	West Ryder Pauper Lunatic Asylum
"Where Did All the Love Go?" (Burns Remix)	2009	—	—	190	—	—	—	"Where Did All the Love Go?" single
"Let's Roll Just Like We Used To"	2012	—	38	—	—	—	—	Velociraptor!
"Explodes"	2014	52	—	—	—	—	40	48:13
"Silver Apple Eyes"	2026	—	—	—	38	—	—	Act III
"—" denotes a release that did not chart or was not issued in that region.

== Soundtrack appearances ==
Song	Year	Album
"Reason is Treason"	2003	Lara Croft: Tomb Raider – The Cradle of Life
"Reason is Treason"	2005	Music from The OC: Mix 5
"L.S.F."	2005	Stealth Original Soundtrack
"Club Foot"	2006	The Guardian Original Soundtrack
"Shoot the Runner"	2007	The Comebacks - Original Motion Picture Soundtrack
"L.S.F."	2008	21 - Music from the Motion Picture
"Club Foot"	2008	Doomsday - Original Motion Picture Soundtrack
"Sun Rise Light Flies"	2008	27 Dresses - Original Motion Picture Soundtrack
"Sun Rise Light Flies"	2008	Morning Light Original Soundtrack
"La Feé Verte"	2010	London Boulevard Soundtrack
"Narcotic Farm"	2010	London Boulevard Soundtrack
"Club Foot"	2010	London Boulevard Soundtrack
"Underdog"	2010	Takers - Original Motion Picture Soundtrack
"Acid Turkish Bath (Shelter from the Storm)"	2011	Killer Elite Motion Picture Soundtrack
"Pistols at Dawn"	2012	Avengers Assemble: Music from and Inspired by the Motion Picture

== Music videos ==
Year	Title	Director(s)
2004	"Reason Is Treason"	Scott Lyon
2004	"Club Foot"	W.I.Z.
2004	"L.S.F. (Lost Souls Forever)"	W.I.Z.
2004	"Processed Beats"	Jason Smith
2004	"Cutt Off"	Simon and Jon
2005	"L.S.F. (Lost Souls Forever)" (U.S. Version)	AV Club
2005	"Club Foot" (Live)	Charlie Lightening
2006	"Empire"	W.I.Z.
2006	"Shoot the Runner"	Alex & Martin
2007	"Me Plus One"	Scott Lyon
2009	"Vlad the Impaler"	Richard Ayoade
2009	"Fire"	W.I.Z.
2009	"Underdog"	Charlie Lightening
2009	"Where Did All the Love Go?"	Charles Mehling
2010	"Vlad the Impaler" (Live)	W.I.Z.
2011	"Switchblade Smiles"	Aitor Throup
2011	"Days Are Forgotten"	AB/CD/CD
2011	"Re-Wired"	Thomas Carty
2012	"Goodbye Kiss"	Charlie Lightening
2012	"Man of Simple Pleasures"	Aitor Throup
2012	"Switchblade Smiles" (Live)	Charlie Lightening
2014	"Eez-eh"	Aitor Throup
2014	"Bumblebeee"	Alex Courtes
2014	"Stevie"	Ninian Doff
2014	"Bow"	Aitor Throup
2017	"You're in Love with a Psycho"	W.I.Z.
2017	"Bless This Acid House"	W.I.Z.
2017	"Are You Looking for Action?"	Sergio Pizzorno
2017	"Ill Ray (The King)"	Dan Cadan
2022	"Scriptvre"	Rawtape
2022	"Chemicals"	Loose
