= Live from Brixton Academy =

Live album by Kasabian
- Released: 4 July 2005
- Recorded: 15 December 2004
- Venue: Brixton Academy (London)
- Genre: Rock
- Length: 68:25
- Labels: Arista (UK); BMG/RCA (US)
- Producers: Kasabian, Jim Abbiss, Garret Lee

Kasabian chronology
Kasabian (2004)	Live from Brixton Academy (2005)	Empire (2006)

Live from Brixton Academy is a live recording from the band Kasabian, available only from some digital download services. It was recorded at Brixton Academy on 15 December 2004. This was the band's final show of their momentous breakthrough year, and band member Sergio Pizzorno's 24th birthday.

== Track listing ==
1. "I.D." – 6:01
2. "Cutt Off" – 5:12
3. "Reason Is Treason" – 5:07
4. "Running Battle" – 5:05
5. "Processed Beats" – 3:49
6. "55" – 4:21
7. "Test Transmission" – 4:40
8. "Butcher Blues" – 5:10
9. "The Nightworkers" – 4:44
10. "Pan Am Slit Scam" – 5:02
11. "L.S.F." – 6:08
12. "U Boat" – 2:58
13. "Ovary Stripe" – 5:29
14. "Club Foot" – 4:30

== Personnel ==
- Tom Meighan - lead vocals (1–6, 8, 11, 14), backing vocals (7, 9), rhythm guitar on "The Nightworkers"
- Sergio Pizzorno - rhythm guitar, keyboards, percussion, backing vocals, lead vocals (7, 9, 12), acoustic guitar (8, 12)
- Christopher Karloff - lead guitar, keyboards, bass on "Club Foot"
- Chris Edwards - bass, guitar on "Club Foot"
- Ian Matthews - drums, percussion
