= Soundtrack of Lara Croft: Tomb Raider – The Cradle of Life =

2003 film soundtrack albums

Lara Croft: Tomb Raider – The Cradle of Life is the 2003 action adventure film directed by Jan de Bont based on the Tomb Raider video game series and is the sequel to Lara Croft: Tomb Raider (2001) with Angelina Jolie reprising her role as the titular character. Two soundtrack albums were released in order to promote the film: an original soundtrack and an original score. The soundtrack album, titled Lara Croft: Tomb Raider – The Cradle of Life (Original Motion Picture Soundtrack) was released on July 22, 2003 by Hollywood and Warner Bros. Records, featuring songs heard in the film, while the second album, Lara Croft: Tomb Raider – The Cradle of Life (Original Motion Picture Score) consisted of the original score composed by Alan Silvestri, which released on July 25, 2003 through Varèse Sarabande.

== Lara Croft: Tomb Raider – The Cradle of Life (Original Motion Picture Soundtrack) ==
Lara Croft: Tomb Raider – The Cradle of Life (Original Motion Picture Soundtrack)

Soundtrack album by Various artists
- Released: July 22, 2003
- Genres: Alternative rock; electronic
- Length: 69:39
- Labels: Hollywood; Warner Bros.

=== Background ===
The album is composed of alternative rock and electronic music, which includes Saliva's unreleased single "Time", a remix of Moby's "Jam for the Ladies" by Jason Nevins, and a remix of P.O.D.'s "Satellite". Other artists included Lunatic Calm, Alexandra Slate, Dandy Warhols, Crystal Method amongst others. Korn's song "Did My Time" was released as a single tying in to the film and featured during the end credits. However, it did not appear on the motion picture soundtrack, due to certain clauses in frontman Jonathan Davis's record contract at the time.

=== Track listing ===
Lara Croft: Tomb Raider – The Cradle of Life (Original Motion Picture Soundtrack)
No.	Title	Artist(s)	Length
1.	"Heart Go Faster"	Davey Brothers	3:30
2.	"The Only Way (Is the Wrong Way)"	Filter	5:15
3.	"Bad Girl"	Alexandra Slate	3:35
4.	"Satellite" (Oakenfold Remix)	P.O.D.	4:52
5.	"The Last High"	The Dandy Warhols	4:46
6.	"Time"	Saliva	5:19
7.	"Leave You Far Behind"	Lunatic Calm	3:13
8.	"Jam for the Ladies" (Jason Nevins Remix)	Moby	4:01
9.	"Starting Over"	The Crystal Method	5:49
10.	"You Can't Look Away"	Sloth	3:47
11.	"I Hate This"	Nadirah "Nadz" Seid	3:35
12.	"Reason Is Treason"	Kasabian	3:45
13.	"Into Hell Again"	3rd Strike	3:11
14.	"Tears from the Moon" (Stateside West Chillout Mix)	Conjure One featuring Sinéad O'Connor	6:06
15.	"Flight to Freedom"	David A. Stewart	3:31
16.	"Pandora's Box"	Alan Silvestri	5:24
Total length:			69:39

=== Reception ===
Johnny Loftus of AllMusic wrote "Tomb Raider: The Cradle of Life might appeal to the franchise's core audience, which has an appreciation for bombast. But its ballast is hard to ignore." Spence D. of IGN wrote "The main problem with this album is that much of the music is just so routine and in many cases uninspired. But then given the stilted nature of the source material (that would be the film), one shouldn't expect the artists involved to have crafted anything earth shattering. In the end, the music on Music From and Inspired By Lara Croft Tomb Raider: The Cradle of Life more often than not fails to excite."

=== Chart performance ===
Chart (2003)	Peak position
Swiss Albums (Schweizer Hitparade)	60
UK Soundtrack Albums (OCC)	15
US Billboard 200	177
US Top Soundtracks (Billboard)	14

=== Accolades ===
Award	Category	Recipient(s)	Result	Ref.
BMI Film & TV Awards	Most Performed Songs from Films	Korn – "Did My Time"	Won	

== Lara Croft: Tomb Raider – The Cradle of Life (Original Motion Picture Score) ==
Lara Croft: Tomb Raider – The Cradle of Life (Original Motion Picture Score)

Soundtrack album by Alan Silvestri
- Released: July 25, 2003
- Genres: Film score; orchestra
- Length: 59:56
- Label: Varèse Sarabande

=== Background ===
Alan Silvestri composed the film score, who replaced Craig Armstrong after the latter left the project due to creative differences. Silvestri incorporated Nathan McCree's compositions for the Tomb Raider video game series, for most of the film's music, while the climatic cue "Pandora's Box" being a fresh composition without any influences. Recorded at the Abbey Road Studios in London, It was performed by the Sinfonia of London.

The album was issued by Varèse Sarabande in 2003, which accompanies 15 cues running for an hour. The label then reissued the score in a two-disc deluxe edition, which included thirty minutes of unreleased musical tracks, including music from the film's "Lab Scene" composed by Armstrong, and Silvestri's previously unheard reinterpretation thereof.

=== Track listing ===
Lara Croft: Tomb Raider – The Cradle of Life (Original Motion Picture Score) – standard edition
No.	Title	Length
1.	"Opening"	1:39
2.	"The Luna Temple"	7:43
3.	"Shark Attack"	3:18
4.	"'I Need Terry Sheridan'"	5:40
5.	"Arrival in China"	1:46
6.	"Captured by the Shay Ling"	5:59
7.	"Escape from Chen"	4:19
8.	"Flower Pagoda Battle"	5:42
9.	"Skydive Getaway"	2:11
10.	"Orb Transmission"	1:42
11.	"Journey to the Cradle of Life"	6:23
12.	"The Cradle of Life"	6:33
13.	"Pandora's Box"	5:24
14.	"'Not Meant to Be Found'"	0:45
15.	"Lara Croft – Tomb Raider"	0:52
Total length:		59:56

Lara Croft: Tomb Raider – The Cradle of Life (Original Motion Picture Score) – deluxe edition
No.	Title	Length
1.	"Opening"	1:40
2.	"Jet Ski / Meet Lara (Note: Previously unreleased.)"	4:09
3.	"The Luna Temple"	7:44
4.	"Shark Attack"	3:18
5.	"Traitor Dying"	3:39
6.	"'I Need Terry Sheridan'"	5:40
7.	"Kill Me / Leaving Prison"	1:32
8.	"Arrival in China"	1:46
9.	"Shay Ling / Tilt Your Head Back"	3:02
10.	"Captured by the Shay Ling"	5:59
11.	"Escape from Chen"	4:19
12.	"To Shanghai / Flower Pagoda Battle Part 2"	3:00
13.	"Flower Pagoda Battle"	5:42
14.	"She Escaped / Break In" (composed by Craig Armstrong)	5:22
15.	"Shoot Her Between the Eyes (Note: Previously unreleased. Not used in the film.)"	4:42
16.	"Skydive Getaway"	2:12
17.	"Skydiving Sequence"	1:51
18.	"Why Didn't You Kill Reiss"	4:45
19.	"Orb Transmission"	1:42
20.	"Journey to the Cradle of Life"	6:23
21.	"Tribal Journey"	1:33
22.	"The Cradle of Life"	6:34
23.	"Pandora's Box"	5:24
24.	"'Not Meant to Be Found'"	0:45
25.	"Lara Croft – Tomb Raider"	0:52
Total length:		93:35

=== Reception ===
Christian Clemmensen of Filmtracks said, "Tomb Raider: The Cradle of Life is a serviceable and occasionally engaging action score, with some fantastic highlights at its conclusion." Anton Smit of Soundtrack World wrote "Alan Silvestri is able to come up with a short and extremely powerful theme, and then integrates it into the rest of the music, giving the whole musical package its identity, but he also keeps the music fresh and interesting during all kinds of scenes. The music provides emotion where needed or just support for the action sequences with musical patterns and melodies." Thomas Glorieux of Maintitles.net wrote "What can you expect of Tomb Raider 2 if you realize both movies had a rocky musical experience? It's at least a lot more enjoyable than the first one of Revell, but not as good as say his masterpiece The Mummy Returns. Tomb Raider 2 is an enjoyable score with sadly too many dead moments, making the score in fact too long for repeated experiences. We expect more of Silvestri, even in these circumstances. It would have been so cool having Silvestri on the POTC movies and [Mark] Mancina on this one."

In contrast, Jack Smith of BBC said "Unstructured, unoriginal and unmemorable, this is definitely closer to the grave than the cradle." James Southall of Movie Wave also added, "all in all, this is something of a disappointment. Given Silvestri's credentials I was expecting something a lot more vibrant and exciting. To be honest, even the best tracks (and there are a few that do impress) are still a little routine by his standards. The album does have one thing going for it though: numerous pictures of a scantily-clad Angelina Jolie. It is very tempting to give it five stars just for that. To be honest, sitting staring at them for an hour, who really cares what the music's like."
