= The Alchemist's Euphoria =

Studio album by Kasabian
- Released: 12 August 2022
- Studios: The Sergery, Leicester, England
- Genres: Rock; electronic; progressive rock
- Length: 38:05
- Label: Sony
- Producers: Serge Pizzorno; Fraser T. Smith

Kasabian chronology
For Crying Out Loud (2017)	The Alchemist's Euphoria (2022)	Happenings (2024)

Singles from The Alchemist's Euphoria
- 1. "Alygatyr" Released: 26 October 2021; 2. "Scriptvre" Released: 6 May 2022; 3. "Chemicals" Released: 3 June 2022; 4. "The Wall" Released: 29 July 2022; 5. "Strictly Old Skool" Released: 18 August 2022

The Alchemist's Euphoria is the seventh studio album by British band Kasabian, released on 12 August 2022 through Sony Music. It is Kasabian's first album in five years, following For Crying Out Loud (2017), and first to feature Serge Pizzorno as a sole lead vocalist after former frontman Tom Meighan was fired in 2020 amid his domestic assault conviction. It is also their first album to feature guitarist Tim Carter as a permanent member, who contributed to all of the band's albums since West Ryder Pauper Lunatic Asylum in 2009, and joined the band in 2013 as a touring guitarist.

The album was produced by Pizzorno and Fraser T. Smith and preceded by four singles—"Alygatyr", "Scriptvre", "Chemicals" and "The Wall". The band toured in support of the album from late 2022.

The album's release was pushed back by a week from 5 August 2022 due to vinyl manufacturing issues.

== Background ==
Former frontman Tom Meighan parted ways with the band in July 2020, and the following day pleaded guilty to assaulting his then-fiancée, now-wife Vikki Ager. Pizzorno, previously the lead guitarist and occasional lead vocalist in the band, then took over sole lead vocal duties.

The album was primarily recorded at Pizzorno's home studio, the Sergery, in Leicester. About the album, Pizzorno stated that it "takes some pretty obscure turns" and has a "big, epic sound but with a personal touch as well. There are some softer edges alongside the massive parts. As a whole, it's a beautiful thing and the most cohesive record we've ever made. It's an emotional trip."

== Critical reception ==
Professional ratings
Aggregate scores
Source	Rating
Metacritic	74/100
Review scores
Source	Rating
The Arts Desk	3/5 stars
Clash	8/10
Classic Rock	5/10 stars
DIY	4/5 stars
Evening Standard	4/5 stars
The Guardian	3/5 stars
The Independent	4/5 stars
MusicOMH	3.5/5 stars
NME	4/5 stars
The Telegraph	4/5 stars

The Alchemist's Euphoria received a score of 74 out of 100 from nine critics' reviews on review aggregator Metacritic, indicating "generally favorable" reception. David Smyth of the Evening Standard wrote that Meighan "was never the most remarkable singer [...] so he's not particularly missed on record", although felt that Pizzorno "will need to grow in stature" to "control" the crowds the band performs to. Smyth described the album as "punchy", writing that "Scriptvre" has "crunching breakbeats and snarling guitars" and "Rocket Fuel" is "a bit silly really, with its mix of rave synths and chanted vocals". Reviewing the album for The Guardian, Michael Hann felt that the album "goes for broke" and "teems with ideas that don't always land", and despite Pizzorno's "imagination elevat[ing] them above their lad-rock leanings", as a vocalist he is "adequate but unremarkable". Hann found The Alchemist's Euphoria "offers up some of the bullish, uptempo rock that sets moshpits roiling. It is generally pretty good fun, too."

== Track listing ==
All tracks are written by Serge Pizzorno.

The Alchemist's Euphoria track listing
No.	Title	Producer(s)	Length
1.	"Alchemist"	Fraser T. Smith	2:39
2.	"Scriptvre"	Smith	3:49
3.	"Rocket Fuel"	Smith	3:02
4.	"Strictly Old Skool"	Smith	3:07
5.	"Alygatyr"	Smith	3:45
6.	"Æ Space"	Sergio Pizzorno, Tim Carter	0:48
7.	"The Wall"	Smith	3:29
8.	"T.U.E (The Ultraview Effect)"	Smith	5:45
9.	"Stargazr"	Pizzorno, Carter	4:56
10.	"Chemicals"	Smith	3:31
11.	"Æ Sea"	Pizzorno, Carter	0:33
12.	"Letting Go"	Pizzorno, Carter	3:03
Total length:			38:27

- On digital services, "Alygatyr" is only 3:23 due to the single version being supplied instead of the album version.

== Personnel ==
Kasabian

- Sergio Pizzorno – vocals, guitars, bass, synthesizers, piano, drum programming, production (tracks 6, 9, 11, 12), mixing (tracks 6, 9–12)
- Chris Edwards – bass guitar, backing vocals
- Ian Matthews – drums, percussion
- Tim Carter – guitar, organ, additional percussion, drum programming, additional production and programming (tracks 6, 9, 11, 12), mixing (tracks 6, 9–12)

Additional musicians

- Fraser T. Smith – additional keyboard, bass and drum programming

Production and design

- Fraser T. Smith – engineering
- Mark "Spike" Stent – mixing (tracks 1–5, 7, 8)
- Stephen McLaughlin – mixing (tracks 6, 9–12)
- John Coyne – management
- Simon Moran – management
- Noel Fielding – cover and back cover painting
- Yasmina Aoun – design
- Alex Bois – design

== Charts ==
Chart performance for The Alchemist's Euphoria
Chart (2022)	Peak position
Australian Digital Albums (ARIA)	32
Australian Physical Albums (ARIA)	60
Belgian Albums (Ultratop Wallonia)	101
German Albums (Offizielle Top 100)	63
Japanese Digital Albums (Oricon)	45
Japanese Hot Albums (Billboard Japan)	73
Irish Albums (IRMA)	80
Scottish Albums (Official Charts)	1
Swiss Albums (Schweizer Hitparade)	26
UK Albums (Official Charts)	1
