= Algorithms (Kasabian song) =

2023 single by Kasabian

Single by Kasabian

from the album Happenings
- Released: 16 June 2023
- Length: 3:09
- Label: Sony
- Songwriter: Serge Pizzorno
- Producers: Serge Pizzorno, Mark Ralph

Kasabian singles chronology
"Strictly Old Skool" (2022)	"Algorithms" (2023)	"Call" (2024)

Algorithms is a song by English rock band Kasabian and the lead single from their eighth album, Happenings. The song was released for digital download on 16 June 2023, by Sony Music. It was released amid a UK and Ireland headline tour, which took place in summer 2023.

== Writing and composition ==
The song was written by Serge Pizzorno and co-produced by Pizzorno and Mark Ralph. Lyrically, "Algorithms" is a commentary on the emergence of artificial intelligence. PopMatters has described the song as "the only one with a less-than-positive message" on the album, which was released a year later.

In a press release, Serge Pizzorno explained that "‘Algorithms’ is a song that explores the idea that robots can’t experience emotion and being in the moment, whereas humans can, and that is the beauty that separates us... for now."

== Lyric video ==
Kasabian have released a lyric video for the single, for which they collaborated with digital design studio Uncanny.
