= Ian Matthews =

Ian or Iain Matthews may refer to:

- Iain Matthews (born 1946), also known as Ian Matthews, British folk-rock musician, and former member of Fairport Convention and Plainsong
- Ian Matthews (drummer) (born 1971), drummer for the English rock band Kasabian
