= Act III (Kasabian album) =

Studio album by Kasabian
- Released: 4 September 2026
- Genres: Art pop; psychedelic rock
- Length: 32:52
- Label: Sony
- Producers: Sergio Pizzorno; Mark Ralph

Kasabian chronology
Happenings (2024)	Act III (2026)

Singles from Act III
- 1. "Hippie Sunshine" Released: 22 September 2025; 2. "Great Pretender" Released: 2 April 2026; 3. "Superpowers" Released: 26 June 2026; 4. "Nothing Better Than This" Released: 14 August 2026

Act III is the ninth studio album by the English rock band Kasabian. It was released on 4 September 2026 by Sony Music.

The album topped the UK Official Albums Chart, making it their eighth consecutive #1 album.

== Background ==
Act III was announced with the release of the single "Hippie Sunshine" on 22 September 2025. The title is a reference to being their third album with Sergio Pizzorno on lead vocals.

The second single, "Great Pretender", was released on 2 April 2026, alongside the album's artwork and track listing. The album was originally set for release on 17 July, but was later delayed to 4 September with the band saying they "had the album back on the operating table for a few final adjustments" and "couldn't send it out into the world without getting everything just right". On 26 June, the same day as the delay announcement, the band released the third single, "Superpowers", and a video featuring Stephen Graham. On 14 August, "Nothing Better Than This" was released as the final single.

== Track listing ==
All tracks are written by Serge Pizzorno.

Act III track listing
No.	Title	Length
1.	"Quiet on Set Please 1m9"	0:45
2.	"Soulmate"	2:27
3.	"Hippie Sunshine"	3:06
4.	"Superpowers"	2:53
5.	"Great Pretender"	2:38
6.	"Nothing Better Than This"	2:38
7.	"Mind Palace 2m7"	0:43
8.	"Silver Apple Eyes"	3:15
9.	"The Guru and the Crypto Time Machine"	3:24
10.	"Npc 3m12"	0:44
11.	"Glide"	3:46
12.	"Hyper//Rising"	3:38
13.	"Say You (Closer)"	2:54
Total length:		32:52

== Critical reception ==
Professional ratings
Review scores
Source	Rating
Clash	8/10
DIY	3/5

== Personnel ==
Credits are adapted from Tidal.

=== Kasabian ===
- Tim Carter – guitar, piano, background vocals, additional production (all tracks); programming (tracks 1, 2, 4–13)
- Chris Edwards – bass, background vocals
- Ian Matthews – drums, percussion
- Sergio Pizzorno – lead vocals, bass, guitar, piano, synthesizer, production (all tracks); programming (1, 2, 4–13), drums (3)

=== Additional contributors ===
- Mark Ralph – production, mixing
- Matt Colton – mastering

== Charts ==
Chart performance for Act III
Chart (2026)	Peak position
Belgian Albums (Ultratop Wallonia)	85
French Physical Albums (SNEP)	60
Japanese Albums (Oricon)	50
Japanese Digital Albums (Oricon)	35
Japanese Download Albums (Billboard Japan)	31
Japanese Rock Albums (Oricon)	10
Japanese Top Albums Sales (Billboard Japan)	66
Scottish Albums (Official Charts)	3
UK Albums (Official Charts)	1
