= Clear Static =

- Origin: Agoura Hills, California
- Genres: Dance-rock, new wave
- Years active: 2002-
- Label: Maverick Records

Clear Static was an American rock band from Los Angeles, California. They gained success after winning a Teen Choice Award through online votes. Their music features a rock based background, with a diversion into New Wave dance during their final years together.

== History ==
Clear Static's members were friends from Oak Park High School, and began playing together in punk rock bands. Eventually, the group coalesced around a shared interest in New Wave bands of the 1980s like Duran Duran and The Fixx. After playing local shows, Tommy Henriksen and Jeff Pilson recorded a 5-song demo that had the band in a bidding war, where they signed with Island Records. After the band left Island records the group was chosen in 2005 by Duran Duran to open dates on their tours in the US and UK. They also signed to Maverick Records subsidiary Lizard King (who had previously signed The Killers) that year, with a self-titled full-length issued by Maverick in 2006. The album featured the single "Make Up Sex", which was remixed and issued as a dance single. These remixes reached #13 on the U.S. Billboard Dance Singles chart and #16 on the Club Play chart.

== Members ==
- Tom Pederson - Lead Vocals
- Michael David - Lead Guitarist, Synthesizers
- Danny Kincaid - Rhythm Guitar, Background Vocals
- Rich Pederson - Bass Guitar
- Jacob Shearer - Drums, Background Vocals

== Personal life ==
Mike David is now a successful DJ called "Classixx"

== Discography ==
- Clear Static (Maverick Records, 2006)
