= ME (band) =

Australian rock band

ME (pronounced "me") were an Australian rock band formed in Melbourne active from 2008 to 2015. The band composed of Luke Ferris (vocals, guitar, piano), Michael Godde (bass, backing vocals), Spike Rogers (drums), and two separate guitarists: Damian Tapley and Joshua Murphy. In 2010 they signed with UK independent record label Lizard King Records and moved to the UK to record their debut album.

After supporting Twin Atlantic, King Charles, Evanescence, Kasabian and Panic! at the Disco, the band released their debut mini-album "Another Story High" early in 2012 and the full-length album "Even the Odd Ones Out" in 2013. Both these releases were recorded by Simon ‘Barny’ Barnicott.

The band cite numerous and wide ranging influences ranging from Led Zeppelin, Queen, The Mars Volta, Muse, Radiohead, and The Beatles, to Rachmaninoff, Philip Glass and American film composer Danny Elfman. The band were also influenced by theatrical performance and their live shows often featured additional on-stage musicians such as drum troupes, violinists, vocal choirs, orchestras, dancers and other guest performers. The band's name was originally written as [Me] but a decision was made to remove the square brackets and is now most commonly written as ME. The band name itself has led to press articles referring to the band as "The Ungoogleables".

== Biography ==
Past members: Damian Tapley (lead guitar 2008–2013).

=== Tours and appearances ===
In Australia, the band supported Dead Letter Circus on an Australian tour in March and April 2011. They played with Kimbra for her first full band show at Revolver and have also played with Husky and Redcoats.

In the UK and Ireland, ME toured with Kasabian, Evanescence, Death From Above 1979, Panic! at the Disco, Twin Atlantic, The Xcerts, King Charles, Arcane Roots and Motion City Soundtrack throughout 2011-2012 and played numerous festivals including Secret Garden Party, The Great Escape, Camden Crawl and Y Not. In November 2012 ME headlined their first tour of the UK. In December of the same year they co-headlined a tour of Germany and Switzerland with New Zealand band I Am Giant.

After eighteen months based in the UK and touring Europe, ME returned to Australia as part of the Big Day Out festival in January 2013. This coincided with the Australian release of their highly anticipated debut album "Even the Odd Ones Out".

In April 2013, ME based themselves in Berlin, Germany, where they wrote and recorded their second album. In June 2013 they played at Southside and Hurricane Festivals. During this time, they also curated a monthly night of cultural expression in urban Berlin known as "Satisfactory Factory". This included bands, DJs, live painters and drum troupes. In October 2014, ME embarked on their first tour of Switzerland with alternative band Neckless. This was followed by the band's first trip to the US, playing as part of the CMJ Music Festival in New York City. Following this, the band played shows in the Netherlands with Go Back to the Zoo.

After two years in Europe, ME finally returned to Australia in January 2015 for a homecoming show at the Evelyn Hotel in Fitzroy, where they launched new single, "Shoot/Day at the Zoo" to a sold out crowd.

On 3 January 2016, ME announced on their Facebook page that they were breaking up. The official statement reads:

"After many years playing music together, amazing times out on the road and in the studio, 3 separate homes in Melbourne, London and Berlin, 2 drummers and 2 guitarists. The 4 of us have decided to call it quits to the life that was ME. We have been lucky enough to travel the world, play countless shows and meet some of our idols. We have also been lucky enough to play shows for some of you, our amazing fans, and for this and all the support you have given us over the years we thank you. From the bottom of our hearts THANK YOU. You made it an amazing ride, and we love you for it. To Martin and Lizard King records, thank you for all your support. ME will be survived by a number of new musical projects that we are very excited to show you. To anybody that ever made it out to a show, bought an album or offered support we love you. Have a safe 2016 doing whatever it is you love. We still have a few more songs to be uploaded to itunes and spotify to complete the catalogue of what will be ME. In the end we hope that you liked the music. We had the time of our lives making it. Love from Mikey, Luke, Spike and Josh"

=== Press ===
In the UK ME received airplay on BBC Radio 1, Kerrang Radio, XFM London, XFM Manchester, Regional BBC Radio (Wales, Gloucestershire, Leicester), NME Radio, Q Radio, Absolute and Cool FM. They also received coverage in ASOS Magazine in an article entitled "The Ungoogleables", The Sunday Times, The Guardian, NME, Kerrang! Magazine, Total Guitar, Rhythm and Nylon Magazine. In France the band were featured on TV show JJDA on channel IDF1. The band were also featured on Swiss TV program "Joiz TV" in October 2014, where they played live acoustic versions of tracks "Sleepwalker" and "All Fall in a Line".

== Discography ==
=== Albums ===
Even The Odd Ones Out (2013)

=== EPs ===
Naked (2010)

Like a Fox (August 2011)

Another Story High (March 2012)

=== Singles ===
Nip & Tuck Me In (2009–10)

Your Favourite Colour (2010)

Westward Backwards (2011)

Naked (2012)

From Even the Odd Ones Out:

Like a Fox / Rock and Roll Dandy (2012)

Vampire!! Vampire!! (2013)

Sleepwalker (2013)

Shoot/Day at the Zoo (2014)

Temple/Angels (2015)
