= Happenings (Kasabian album) =

Studio album by Kasabian
- Released: 5 July 2024
- Recorded: 2022–2023
- Genres: Psychedelic rock; experimental pop; art pop; pop rock
- Length: 28:00
- Label: Sony
- Producers: Serge Pizzorno; Mark Ralph

Kasabian chronology
The Alchemist's Euphoria (2022)	Happenings (2024)	Act III (2026)

Singles from Happenings
- 1. "Algorithms" Released: 16 June 2023; 2. "Call" Released: 21 February 2024; 3. "Coming Back to Me Good" Released: 12 April 2024; 4. "Darkest Lullaby" Released: 21 June 2024

Happenings is the eighth studio album by the English rock band Kasabian. It was released on 5 July 2024 through Sony Music.

== Background and singles ==
Kasabian announced Happenings on 5 December 2023, shortly after recording wrapped with two days left for the mixing process. Inspired by gigs of 1960s psychedelic bands, it was said to be a "joyous" album filled with "big tunes". The band started recording while they were touring their previous record The Alchemist's Euphoria in late 2022. The album release on 5 July 2024 will coincide with their homecoming headline show at Victoria Park, Leicester on 6 July.

The lead single "Algorithms", a commentary on the emergence of artificial intelligence, was released on 16 June 2023, more than a year ahead of the album release. "Call" was released as the second single on 21 February 2024, a song the band referred to as "dance music". On 12 April, they released the "summer-ready" "Coming Back to Me Good" in the form "of a short and sweet anthem" with a "disco drive" but also moments of "togetherness", according to Serge Pizzorno.

== Critical reception ==
Professional ratings
Aggregate scores
Source	Rating
Metacritic	74/100
Review scores
Source	Rating
The Arts Desk	2/5 stars
Clash	7/10
The Guardian	3/5 stars
The Independent	4/5 stars
Louder Than War	4/5
MusicOMH	2/5 stars
NME	4/5 stars
The Observer	3/5 stars
The Telegraph	4/5 stars

Happenings received a score of 74 out of 100 on review aggregator Metacritic based on 13 critics' reviews, indicating "generally favorable" reception. Mojo felt that "short it may be, but Happenings is full of ideas".

The album's production was acclaimed; Neil McCormick of The Telegraph applauded the band's continuation of their pop sound. Robin Murray of Clash praised the songwriting and new direction, while Phil Mongredien of The Guardian said that "with Meighan gone, Happenings does at times sound like the work of a band struggling with an identity crisis and consequently cosplaying some of their peers".

== Track listing ==
All tracks are written by Serge Pizzorno.

Happenings track listing
No.	Title	Length
1.	"Darkest Lullaby"	3:10
2.	"Call"	2:30
3.	"How Far Will You Go"	1:49
4.	"Coming Back to Me Good"	2:49
5.	"G.O.A.T"	3:07
6.	"Passengers"	2:50
7.	"Hell of It"	3:23
8.	"Italian Horror"	2:35
9.	"Bird in a Cage"	2:38
10.	"Algorithms"	3:09
Total length:		28:00

Japanese edition bonus track
No.	Title	Length
12.	"Coming Back to Me Good" (Acoustic Version)	2:29
Total length:		31:34

=== Notes ===
- Physical editions include a short introductory instrumental track, "Happenings".

== Personnel ==
Kasabian

- Chris Edwards – bass guitar, background vocals
- Tim Carter – guitars, piano, bass guitar, drum production, background vocals, keyboards, additional production
- Ian Matthews – drums, percussion, piano
- Sergio Pizzorno – lead vocals, guitars, bass guitar, drum production, Mellotron, piano, synthesizers

Additional contributors

- Mark Ralph – production, mixing, programming
- Matt Colton – mastering
- Rob Harvey – background vocals on "Call", "How Far Will You Go", and "Passengers"

== Charts ==
Chart performance for Happenings
Chart (2024)	Peak position
Belgian Albums (Ultratop Wallonia)	147
Japanese Digital Albums (Oricon)	40
Japanese Hot Albums (Billboard Japan)	64
Scottish Albums (Official Charts)	1
Swiss Albums (Schweizer Hitparade)	90
UK Albums (Official Charts)	1
