= King Records =

King Records may refer to:

- King Records (Japan), a Japanese record label founded in 1931
- King Records (United States), an American record label active 1943–1975
- Lizard King Records, a New York and London-based independent label founded in 2002
