= Kasabian (album) =

Studio album by Kasabian
- Released: 6 September 2004
- Recorded: 2004
- Genres: Electronic rock; space rock; alternative rock; baggy
- Length: 53:16
- Labels: Paradise; RCA
- Producers: Kasabian; Jim Abbiss

Kasabian chronology
Kasabian (2004)	Empire (2006)

Singles from Kasabian
- 1. "Reason Is Treason" Released: 23 February 2004; 2. "Club Foot" Released: 10 May 2004; 3. "L.S.F. (Lost Souls Forever)" Released: 9 August 2004; 4. "Processed Beats" Released: 11 October 2004; 5. "Cutt Off" Released: 3 January 2005

Kasabian is the debut studio album by British rock band Kasabian, released on 6 September 2004. The album's highest chart position on the UK Albums Chart was number 4, making it the band's only studio album not to reach number one. Five singles were released from Kasabian.

This is the only full album to feature the lead guitarist and lead songwriter Christopher Karloff, who left the band during the recording sessions of their next album, Empire. The album features a rotating cast of drummers, with full-time drummer Ian Matthews joining the band after the release of the album.

== Release ==
Different geographical regions had different colours for their album cover. The British version is black and white, the European import is black and red, and the American version is black and blue. The Japanese "Ultimate Version" is silver and white. The UK limited-edition version is a double-sided DualDisc and has a glow-in-the-dark cover. The DVD element contains a making-of documentary and several music videos.

This album has been released with the Copy Control protection system in some regions. In the United States and Canada it uses the MediaMax CD-3 system.

The Canadian version of the album does not contain the songs "Orange", "Pinch Roller" and "Ovary Stripe", with the exception of digital releases.

== Composition ==
=== Tracks ===
The opening track "Club Foot" features a signature distorted bass riff, played by Christopher Karloff and features "a quilt of relentless beats, hissing electronic noises, buzzing guitar and Tom Meighan's breathless, menacing vocals", and lyrics inspired by the Iraq War. "Processed Beats", one of eventual drummer Ian Matthews' two contributions to the album has been compared to The Stone Roses with its "shambolic beat" and unison chorus from Meighan and Pizzorno. "Reason is Treason" was branded as an "indie rock seducer", with a sound resembling "Stereolab backing Ian Brown".

"L.S.F (Lost Souls Forever)" features prominent use of the electronic instrument Omnichord, played by Karloff and was described as featuring "massive backswells of low-end punch overlaid with Tom Meighan's monotonic snarl and Sergio Pizzorno's swirling guitars and electronics." "Test Transmission", the first of two songs to feature Pizzorno on lead vocals was branded as "prog rock danced in baggy jeans" and "Chemical Brothers-esque psychedelic electronica". Noted for its opening lyric 'John was a scientist, he was hooked on LSD', the fifth and final single "Cutt Off" "pitches space-age synths to the sort of psycho-babble only usually risked by Orb".

"Butcher Blues" was described as "cinematic" and featuring "hazy dissolves, tube station announcement vocals, and head-nodding electronic percussion". After the instrumental track "Ovary Stripe", "U Boat" closes out the album, featuring Pizzorno's vocals over "layered organic and electronic bliss", resulting in "space rock meeting angst rock". After a long gap, a hidden track plays, the Jacknife Lee remix of "Reason is Treason".

== Critical reception ==
Professional ratings
Aggregate scores
Source	Rating
Metacritic	65/100
Review scores
Source	Rating
AllMusic	4/5 stars
Entertainment Weekly	C+
The Guardian	4/5 stars
The Irish Times	4/5 stars
Mojo	3/5 stars
NME	7/10
Pitchfork	5.2/10
Q	3/5 stars
Rolling Stone	2/5 stars
Uncut	3/5 stars

Kasabian received generally favourable reviews but music critics were mixed on the band's mixture of alternative rock and electronica. At Metacritic, which assigns a normalised rating out of 100 to reviews from mainstream critics, the album received an average score of 65, based on 21 reviews.

AllMusic's David Jeffries praised the album for its take on different rock genres and compared them favourably to The Stone Roses and Tangerine Dream, saying that "Painting them as rock's saviors just makes the overly ambitious moments of the album look all that much bigger." Paul Moody of NME praised the album for its aggressive instrumentals and space rock sound resembling that of The Libertines. He singled out "Test Transmission" as the standout track, calling it "an indication that once they've purged the violent tendencies, a future as space-rockers in the Spiritualized mould awaits." Betty Clarke of The Guardian praised the album's overall sound for resembling baggy music, saying that it "sums up Kasabian's affection for experimentation of every description."

Johnny Loftus, writing for Pitchfork, commended the album's high-energy tracks for containing production that will grab listeners' attention but felt that it loses steam in places and will send said listeners away to better records that inspired it, concluding that "Kasabian is brash, loutish, and seems liable at times to cut you; the consistent kick drum beat throughout it is like a great party's heartbeat. But like the roustabout in the corner, drinking all the lager and scratching up your old records, it can be more loudmouthed than substantial." Tom Edwards of Drowned in Sound criticized the album's songs for lacking any hooks and nuances to grab the listener's attention concluding with, "Sure this album may well sound awesome if you've just snorted a metre of charlie or recently breakfasted from a menu of 'shrooms and LSD, but for sober ears it's enough to drive anyone to drugs." Barry Walters of Rolling Stone criticized the band for filling the album with half-baked ideas based on influences from Happy Mondays and Primal Scream, saying that "Kasabian make the mistake of trying to be revolutionary by quoting revolutionaries."

== Track listing ==
All lyrics are written by Sergio Pizzorno; all music is composed by Pizzorno and Christopher Karloff.

No.	Title	Length
1.	"Club Foot"	3:34
2.	"Processed Beats"	3:08
3.	"Reason Is Treason"	4:35
4.	"I.D."	4:47
5.	"Orange"	0:46
6.	"L.S.F. (Lost Souls Forever)"	3:17
7.	"Running Battle"	4:15
8.	"Test Transmission"	3:55
9.	"Pinch Roller"	1:13
10.	"Cutt Off"	4:38
11.	"Butcher Blues"	4:28
12.	"Ovary Stripe"	3:50
13.	"U Boat" ("U Boat" ends at 04:07, continues with hidden track "Reason Is Treason (Jacknife Lee Version)", which begins at 07:07)	10:51

Deluxe Edition Bonus DVD
No.	Title	Length
1.	"Reason Is Treason" (Video)
2.	"Club Foot" (Video)
3.	"L.S.F. (Lost Souls Forever)" (Video)
4.	"Club Foot" (Making of)
5.	"L.S.F. (Lost Souls Forever)" (Making of)
6.	"Field of Dreams" (Documentary)

Japan Only Bonus Tracks
No.	Title	Length
14.	"Club Foot" (Jagz Kooner Vocal Mix)	3:19
15.	"Sand Clit"	3:57
16.	"55" (Live from Brixton Academy)	4:26
17.	"Out of Space" (The Prodigy cover) (Live Lounge Version)	2:28
18.	"The Duke"	3:37
19.	"Bang"	9:49

Japan Only Bonus DVD
No.	Title	Length
1.	"Club Foot" (Live from Brixton Academy)
2.	"2004 Tour Documentary"

German Limited Edition Bonus Disc
No.	Title	Length
1.	"L.S.F. (Lost Souls Forever)"	3:17
2.	"Lab Twat"	3:20
3.	"Doctor Zapp"	3:34
4.	"L.S.F. (Lost Souls Forever)" (Jagz Kooner Mix Edit)	3:13
5.	"L.S.F. (Lost Souls Forever)" (Music Video)	3:50

== Personnel ==
Adapted from the Kasabian liner notes.

- Tom Meighan – lead vocals (tracks 1–4, 6, 7, 10, 11), backing vocals (tracks 8, 13)
- Sergio Pizzorno – rhythm guitar (tracks 1–4, 6–8, 10–13), synths (all tracks), lead vocals (tracks 8, 13), vocals (track 3), backing vocals (tracks 1, 2, 4, 6, 7, 10–12)
- Christopher Karloff – lead guitar (tracks 1–4, 6–8, 10–13), synths (all tracks), omnichord (tracks 2–4, 6, 10–12), bass (tracks 1, 3, 8)
- Chris Edwards – bass (tracks 2, 4, 6-7, 10–13)
- Ian Matthews – drums (tracks 2, 11)
- Ryan Glover – drums (tracks 3, 8)
- Martin Hall-Adams - drums (track 6)
- Daniel Ralph Martin – drums (track 10)
- Mitch Glover – drums (track 12)

Production

- Kasabian – production
- Jim Abbiss – additional production and mixing (tracks 1–4, 6–8, 10–13)
- Barny – mixing and engineering (tracks 5, 9), mix engineer (tracks 1–4, 7, 8, 10, 12, 13)
- Damian Taylor – programming (tracks 6, 11)
- John Dent – mastering
- Simon Corkin – design, illustration
- Jill Furmanovsky – band photography

== Charts and certifications ==
=== Weekly charts ===
Chart (2004–2005)	Peak position
Dutch Albums (Album Top 100)	72
French Albums (SNEP)	70
Irish Albums (IRMA)	22
Italian Albums (FIMI)	56
Japanese Albums (Oricon)	17
Scottish Albums (Official Charts)	3
UK Albums (Official Charts)	4
UK Jazz & Blues Albums (Official Charts)	26
UK R&B Albums (Official Charts)	11
US Billboard 200	94

Chart (2014)	Peak position
UK Album Downloads (Official Charts)	13

=== Year-end charts ===
Chart (2004)	Position
UK Albums (OCC)	77
Chart (2005)	Position
UK Albums (OCC)	44
Chart (2006)	Position
UK Albums (OCC)	164

=== Certifications ===
Region	Certification	Certified units/sales
Japan (RIAJ)	Gold	100,000^{^}
United Kingdom (BPI)	3× Platinum	1,049,586
^{^} Shipments figures based on certification alone.
