= Cutt Off =

2005 single by Kasabian

Single by Kasabian

from the album Kasabian
- B-side: "Beneficial Herbs (demo)"
- Released: 3 January 2005
- Length: 3:26
- Label: RCA
- Songwriters: Sergio Pizzorno, Christopher Karloff
- Producers: Jim Abbiss, Kasabian

Kasabian singles chronology
"Processed Beats" (2004)	"Cutt Off" (2005)	"Club Foot (reissue)" (2005)

"Cutt Off" is the fourth single from Kasabian's eponymous album. It is Kasabian's second-highest UK Singles Chart entry at number eight. The single version was a re-working of the album version, featuring a new drum track, a different mix and slightly changed lyrics. The maxi CD features Kasabian's Radio 1 Live Lounge versions of their own "Processed Beats" and a cover of "Out of Space" by The Prodigy. The 10-inch vinyl version came in a poster bag, and featured the exclusive tracks "Pan Am Slit Scam" and a Mad Action remix of "Cutt Off".

== Music video ==
The official music video depicts people in a New York street running from an unseen threat, which is revealed to be a giant flying shark, however the band are unfazed by it, with the shark flying around the members several times.

== Track listings ==
Maxi CD

- PARADISE26
1. "Cutt Off" (Single Version) – 3:26
2. "Processed Beats" (Live Lounge version)
3. "Out Of Space" (Live Lounge version)
4. CD-Rom with "Cutt Off" video and Movement Gallery print-off poster

Mini CD

- PARADISE25
1. "Cutt Off" (Single Version) – 3:26
2. "Beneficial Herbs" (Demo) – 3:53

10-inch vinyl

- PARADISE27
1. "Cutt Off" (Single Version) – 3:26
2. "Pan Am Slit Scam"
3. "Cutt Off" (Mad Action Remix)

== Personnel ==
Kasabian

- Tom Meighan – lead vocals
- Sergio Pizzorno – rhythm guitar, backing vocals, synths
- Christopher Karloff – lead guitar, synths, omnichord
- Chris Edwards – bass

Additional credits

- Daniel Ralph Martin – drums
- Ian Matthews – drums (single version only)
