= Tom Meighan =

English singer (born 1981)

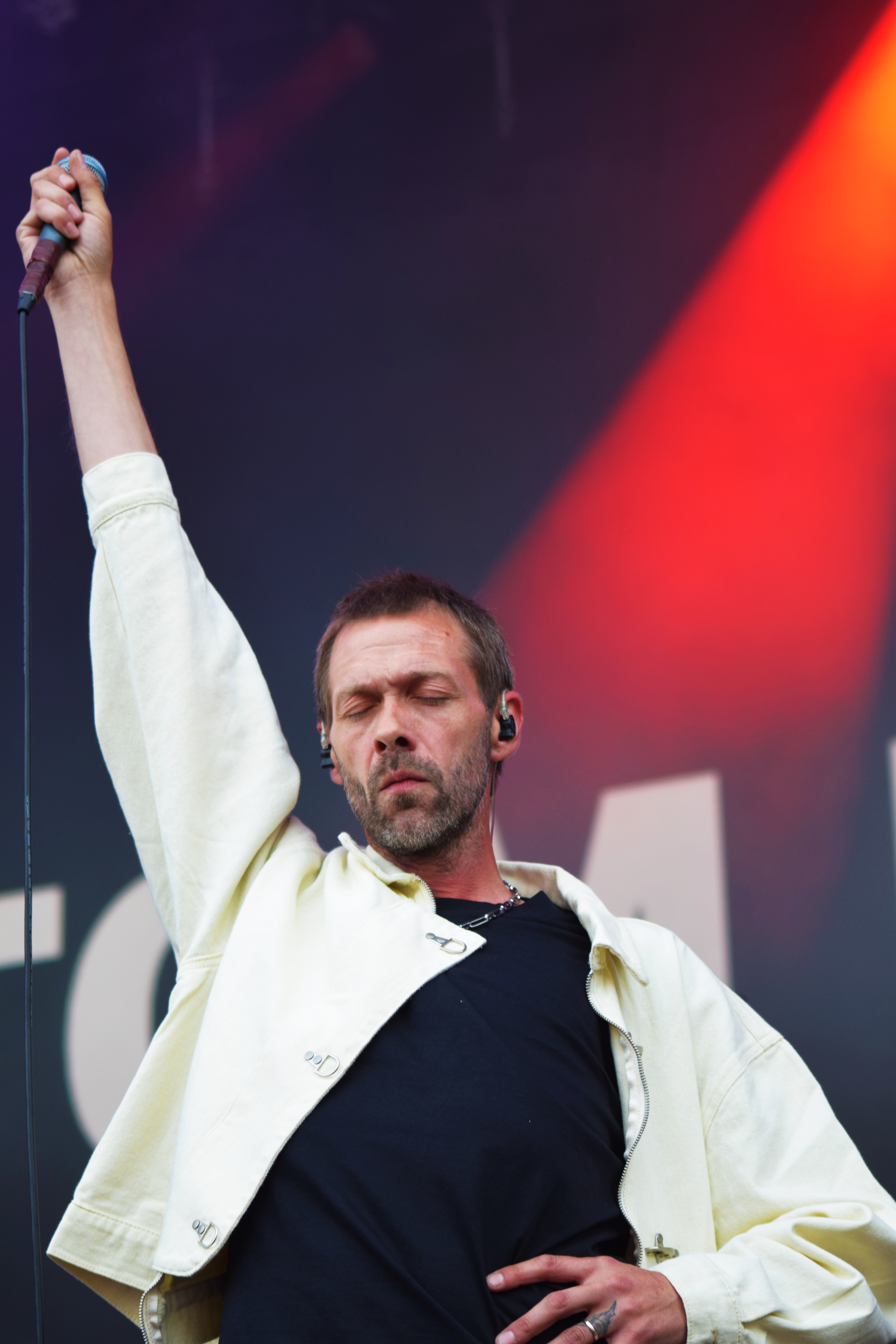
- Meighan performing in 2026

Background information
- Born: Thomas Peter Meighan; 11 January 1981 (age 45); Blaby, Leicestershire, England
- Genres: Indie rock; space rock; neo-psychedelia; electronica
- Occupation: Singer
- Years active: 1997–present
- Formerly of: Kasabian

Thomas Peter Meighan (/ˈmiːən/; born 11 January 1981) is an English singer. He co-founded the rock band Kasabian in 1997 and was its lead vocalist until 2020, when he was removed due to a domestic assault conviction that year.

With Meighan, Kasabian released six studio albums and enjoyed commercial success, including five number-one albums on the UK Albums Chart and four top-10 hits on the UK singles chart. He is said to have an intense and frenetic personality both on and off stage. He has been compared to Liam Gallagher, whom he has referred to as the "perfect frontman". He finished 13th in Radio X's poll of the greatest frontmen.

== Early life ==
Thomas Peter Meighan was born in Blaby on 11 January 1981, the son of English nurse Patricia and Irish window cleaner Tom Meighan Sr. He attended Countesthorpe Leysland Community College. He passed Art and English Literature at school, but was ungraded for many other exams after failing to attend them. He enjoyed music ranging from Motown to hip-hop, and constantly sang Cypress Hill songs during his youth. He said, "It was a very musical house with Motown and a lot of soul music. That's what I grew up on. It was just a very loving house. It's got a very warm feeling."

== Career ==
Meighan became the lead vocalist of Kasabian at the band's inception in Leicester in 1997. He sang lead vocals on the majority of the band's recordings. He did not play any instruments within the group, apart from percussion on occasion and guitar on live renditions of "The Nightworkers" and "Test Transmission".

Meighan was a guest vocalist on the Dark Horses track "Count Me In", which he performed with that band when they opened for Kasabian on the West Ryder tour. Additionally, he sang backing vocals on the Jersey Budd single "She Came Back". Meighan has also appeared onstage with Zak Starkey's band Penguinsrising.

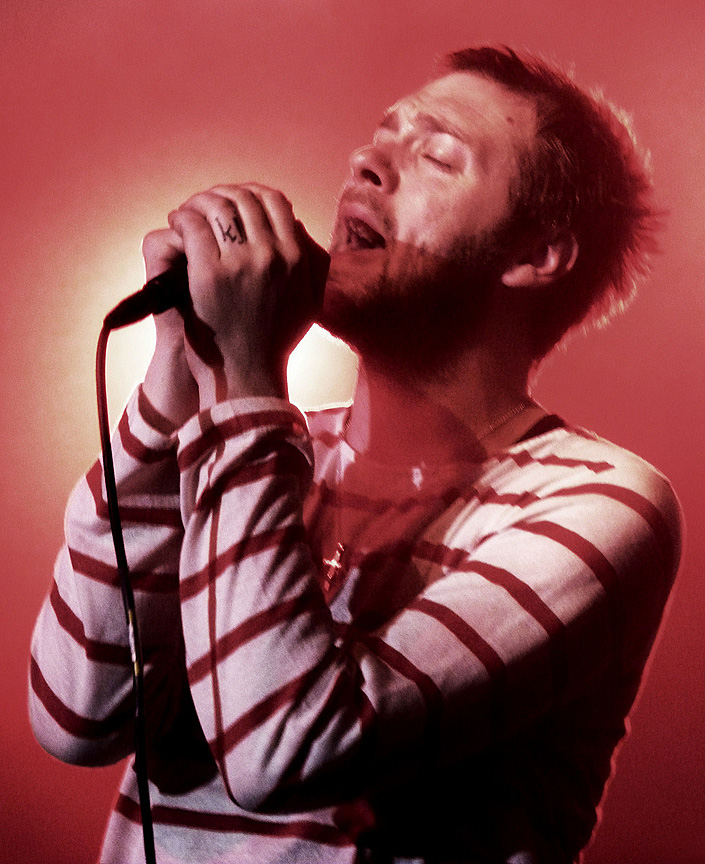
Meighan performing in 2010

In 2013, Meighan began a project with rapper Wottee Watnot (Andrew Wattie) called Mic Rockers, described as "a hip hop/rock collaboration". The first video from the duo, "Mic Rockers", was released on 13 November 2013. In addition to the numerous musical awards he shares with the rest of Kasabian, he was named the 19th-best frontman of all time by a Q magazine readers' poll, and 13th-best frontman of all time by a 2012 Xfm listeners' poll.

Meighan took his first acting role in early 2011, as Terry Graham in the sitcom pilot Walk Like a Panther. Reportedly, he had previously rejected offers to appear in Marie Antoinette due to being committed to Kasabian.

On 6 July 2020, it was announced that Meighan was stepping down from Kasabian by mutual consent due to personal issues. The next day, he pleaded guilty to assaulting his fiancée on 9 April 2020. The rest of the band said, "As soon as we found out about the charges made against Tom, we as a band made the decision that we could no longer work with him. Ultimately, as much as Tom hurt us all, we're not the victims in all of this. Domestic violence is something that can never be excused."

In October 2020, Meighan announced that he was working on solo projects. A year later, he shared a snippet of a song called "Would You Mind" on his Instagram account, explaining that the song was about "asking for help when you need it the most but can't find the courage to ask." He also added that he had recorded several songs that were "ready to share." On 31 October 2021, "Would You Mind" was released as a free download.

In 2021, Meighan wrote publicly on the Medium platform about his experience during his time with Kasabian and the events that followed his departure.

On 5 May 2023, Meighan released his debut solo album, The Reckoning, which peaked at number 17 in the UK album charts.

In December 2024, Meighan's track "Would You Mind" was used by Andy's Man Club for their campaign on men's mental health. In January 2025, Meighan released his second album, RoadRunner. Throughout the year, he was seen around England performing regularly in order to promote the album.

== Public image ==
Meighan has been a critic of the internet's effects on the music industry, and was one of a number of celebrities to criticise Simon Cowell's handling of Susan Boyle in 2009: "It will torture her for the rest of her life. She is not ready for it and she is not made for it. She is being manipulated. It's horrible."

As of 2009, Meighan was making an attempt to tone down his controversial image. He told the Daily Record, "When we released the first album, it didn't help in interviews that we slagged everyone off. We were only messing about, we were having fun but everyone took it a little too seriously. We did it for effect but we were portrayed as monsters instead of just a bunch of lads in a band. They got us so wrong. I don't regret anything we said but it was ridiculous."

Meighan has supported numerous charities including Oxfam, UNICEF, and the Teenage Cancer Trust. In support of the latter, he assumed the role of Ace Face in The Who's 2011 benefit performance of Quadrophenia.

Meighan was chosen to unveil Umbro's away football kit for England in 2010, the first singer ever to do so. He has also modelled for Gio-Goi and Deadly Sins.

== Personal life ==
Meighan dated Kim James, with whom he has a daughter named Mimi, until 2016.

On 7 July 2020, one day after leaving Kasabian, Meighan pleaded guilty to assaulting his fiancée, Vikki Ager. Prosecutor Naeem Valli told the court that that Meighan "smelt heavily of intoxicants" and that the "sustained assault" had left Ager with bruises on her knees, elbow, and ankle, as well as red marks around her neck. Ager was hit in the face, shoved up against a hamster cage, pushed over repeatedly, held by the throat and threatened with a wooden pallet during the assault on 9 April. Footage of the incident showed a drunken Meighan striking Ager and dragging her by the ankles into the back garden of their home, causing her multiple injuries. He was ordered to perform community service. He issued a public apology in which he said he had been struggling with alcohol addiction and ADHD, had left rehab three weeks earlier and was intent on staying sober, that his ADHD diagnosis did not excuse his behaviour but had helped him to understand more about his "behavioural issues", and assured his fans that the assault was an isolated incident.

== Discography ==
=== Albums with Kasabian ===
- Kasabian (2004)
- Empire (2006)
- West Ryder Pauper Lunatic Asylum (2009)
- Velociraptor! (2011)
- 48:13 (2014)
- For Crying Out Loud (2017)

=== Solo albums ===
- The Reckoning (2023) – No.17 UK
- Roadrunner (2025) – No.47 UK
- The Past, The Present, The Raw (2025)

=== Singles ===
- "Would You Mind" (2021)
- "Movin' On" / "Out of This World" (2022)
- "Let It Ride" / "Icarus" (2022)
- "Put Your Foot Down" (2022)
- "Don't Give In" (2023)
- "Sunshine" / "Everyday People" (2023)
- "White Lies" (2024)
- "We Can Do It" (2024)
- "High on You" (2024)
- "Better Life" (2024)
- "Headcase" (2024)
- "Silver Linings" (2025)
