= Live! (Kasabian album) =

Live album by Kasabian
- Released: 25 June 2012
- Recorded: 14 and 15 December 2011
- Venue: The O2 Arena (London)
- Genres: Alternative rock, indie rock
- Length: 73:08
- Label: Eagle
- Producers: Kasabian, Charlie Lightening

Kasabian chronology
| Velociraptor! (2011) | Live! (2012) | 48:13 (2014) |

Live! is the second live recording from the band Kasabian. It was recorded at the O2 Arena in London on 15 December 2011. It was released in CD, DVD and Blu-ray Disc formats.

The audio CD was recorded on 14 and 15 December 2011 and first released as a limited edition exclusively by Concert Live in February 2012 before being reissued by Sony in May 2012.

== Track listing ==
=== CD: Live! ===
| No. | Title | Length |
|---|---|---|
| 1. | "Days Are Forgotten" | 6:52 |
| 2. | "Shoot The Runner" | 3:49 |
| 3. | "Velociraptor!" | 3:10 |
| 4. | "Underdog" | 6:11 |
| 5. | "Where Did All The Love Go?" | 5:06 |
| 6. | "I.D." | 6:01 |
| 7. | "Man of Simple Pleasures" | 4:03 |
| 8. | "Thick as Thieves" | 4:06 |
| 9. | "Take Aim" | 6:43 |
| 10. | "Club Foot" | 3:56 |
| 11. | "Re-Wired" | 5:17 |
| 12. | "Empire" | 4:10 |
| 13. | "La Fée Verte" | 6:10 |
| 14. | "Fast Fuse" | 6:25 |
| 15. | "Goodbye Kiss" | 4:36 |
| 16. | "L.S.F. (Lost Souls Forever)" | 6:30 |
| 17. | "Switchblade Smiles" | 6:32 |
| 18. | "Vlad the Impaler" | 5:10 |
| 19. | "Fire" | 9:05 |

=== DVD: Live at the O2 ===
| No. | Title | Length |
|---|---|---|
| 1. | "Days Are Forgotten" |
| 2. | "Shoot The Runner" |
| 3. | "Velociraptor!" |
| 4. | "Underdog" |
| 5. | "Where Did All The Love Go?" |
| 6. | "I.D." |
| 7. | "I Hear Voices" |
| 8. | "Thick as Thieves" |
| 9. | "Take Aim" |
| 10. | "Club Foot" |
| 11. | "Re-Wired" |
| 12. | "Empire" |
| 13. | "La Fée Verte" |
| 14. | "Fast Fuse/Misirlou/Jingle Bells" |
| 15. | "Goodbye Kiss" |
| 16. | "L.S.F. (Lost Souls Forever)" |
| 17. | "Switchblade Smiles" |
| 18. | "Vlad the Impaler" |
| 19. | "Fire" |
| 20. | "I Hear Voices" (Documentary) |

Bonus Audio CD
| No. | Title | Length |
|---|---|---|
| 1. | "Days Are Forgotten" |
| 2. | "Shoot The Runner" |
| 3. | "Velociraptor!" |
| 4. | "Underdog" |
| 5. | "Take Aim" |
| 6. | "Club Foot" |
| 7. | "Re-Wired" |
| 8. | "La Fée Verte" |
| 9. | "Goodbye Kiss" |
| 10. | "L.S.F. (Lost Souls Forever)" |
| 11. | "Switchblade Smiles" |
| 12. | "Vlad the Impaler" |
| 13. | "Fire" |

== Personnel ==
- Tom Meighan – lead vocals
- Sergio Pizzorno – vocals, electric and acoustic guitars, keyboards
- Chris Edwards – bass
- Ian Matthews – drums, percussion
- Jay Mehler – lead guitar
- Ben Kealey – keyboards
- Gary Alesbrook – trumpet
