= Alexandra Slate =

Alexandra Slate is the stage name for Alexandra Seightholm, a Canadian singer.

Slate's first recording was her LP Half Full, self-released when she was 16. As a teenager Slate wrote songs and worked in coffeehouses in her hometown Toronto. In 1999 she performed at the Canadian Music Week, which led to a deal with Management Trust, Ltd. She had a side-stage performance at the Lilith Fair in Toronto in August 1999 and performed again at the Canadian Music Week in 2000. Slate later signed with Hollywood Records and began working on her album Edge of a Girl with Rob Cavallo.

Edge of a Girl was released in September 2003, "accompanied by a strong online push for the single Bad Girl." Allmusic gave the album 3 out of 5 stars, stating "When her rich, sultry vocals aren't losing ground against the onslaught of busy, scratchy, heard-it-all-before production, Slate is able to convey some real emotion". Allmusic however criticised the album for its similarities to Lucy Woodwards music released at the same time. Stylus Magazine gave a favourable review, calling the album "pretty good, lots of angst-rock in the Lillix model with vocals closer to Aimee Mann". Stylus stated the record achieved poor sales in the absence of a concentrated PR push, and added that had it been released a year later it may have been more successful, as by that time Hollywood Records were promoting most of their new artists on Radio Disney. Her first single from the album, Bad Girl, was featured on the Lara Croft Tomb Raider: The Cradle of Life soundtrack, also being one of several songs to appear in the films closing credits. Reviewing the soundtrack, Allmusic called Bad Girl "an ambitious yet unsatisfying slice of Aimee Mann-inspired adult alternative; its catty yet cerebral lyricisms have all been done before."
