= Processed Beats =

2004 single by Kasabian

Single by Kasabian

from the album Kasabian
- Released: 11 October 2004
- Recorded: 2003
- Genre: Indie rock; electronic rock; neo-psychedelia
- Length: 3:19
- Label: RCA, Paradise
- Songwriters: Christopher Karloff; Sergio Pizzorno
- Producers: Jim Abbiss; Kasabian

Kasabian singles chronology
"L.S.F." (2004)	"Processed Beats" (2004)	"Cutt Off" (2005)

"Processed Beats" is the third fully released single from English rock band Kasabian. It was released on 11 October 2004 and entered the UK Charts at #17. It was originally released as a demo, as Kasabian's first single, in limited numbers.

== Music video ==
The music video features the band perform in a warehouse, and later the woods. As well as being their first song to feature Ian Matthews on drums, it is also his first music video appearance, although he is kept in the background due to not yet being an official member, and in the shot of the band going to the woods, he is not seen with them.

== Track listing ==
=== 2003 original release ===
CD promo

- PARADISE 01
1. "Processed Beats" (demo) – 3:16

10" vinyl

- PARADISE 02
1. "Processed Beats" (demo) – 3:16

=== 2004 reissue ===
Maxi CD

- PARADISE21
1. "Processed Beats" – 3:08
2. "The Nightworkers" – 3:16
3. "L.S.F." (Live @ Cabinet War Rooms) – 3:28
4. "Processed Beats" (Afrika Bambaataa Remix) – 3:42
5. CD-Rom with Processed Beats video, Movement Itinerary and Customisable Wallpaper

Mini CD

- PARADISE20
1. "Processed Beats" – 3:08
2. "The Nightworkers" – 3:16

Japan CD

- BVCP-29911
1. "Processed Beats" – 3:09
2. "The Nightworkers" – 3:16
3. "L.S.F." (Live @ Cabinet War Rooms) – 3:30
4. "Processed Beats" (Afrika Bambaataa Remix) – 3:39
5. "I.D." (Live in Tokyo at Summer Sonic Festival, 8 Aug 2004) – 5:29
6. CD-Rom with Processed Beats video

10" vinyl

- PARADISE22

Side A:

1. "Processed Beats" – 3:08
2. "Ovary Stripe" (Remix) – 4:02

Side B:

1. "Processed Beats" (Afrika Bambaataa Remix) – 3:42

== Personnel ==
- Tom Meighan – lead vocals
- Sergio Pizzorno – guitar, backing vocals, synths
- Christopher Karloff – guitar, synths, omnichord
- Chris Edwards – bass
- Ian Matthews – drums
