= Club Foot (song) =

2004 single by Kasabian

Single by Kasabian

from the album Kasabian
- B-side: "Trash Can"; "Sand Clit"
- Released: 10 May 2004
- Recorded: 2004
- Genre: Indie rock; alternative rock; post-punk revival; space rock
- Length: 3:34 (album version); 2:49 (single version)
- Label: Paradise, RCA
- Songwriters: Christopher Karloff; Sergio Pizzorno
- Producers: Jim Abbiss; Kasabian

Kasabian singles chronology
"Reason Is Treason" (2004)	"Club Foot" (2004)	"L.S.F." (2004)

Music video
- "Club Foot" on YouTube

"Club Foot" is a song by English indie rock band Kasabian, featured on their 2004 debut album, Kasabian. It was released on 10 May 2004 in the UK.

In October 2011, NME placed it at number 108 on its list "150 Best Tracks of the Past 15 Years". The song was used in the 2012 video game Alan Wake's American Nightmare.

== Background ==
Bassist Chris Edwards said, "It's about love and life. At the time [in 2002] [sic], the war in Iraq had just kicked off and the lyrics aren't about pushing you in one way or another, but just about what was going on at the time, what you'd read in the paper about soldiers being petrol bombed."

Guitarist Serge Pizzorno said the song is about "revenge and having it out."

== Composition ==
Serge Pizzorno said, "We were watching a Beach Boys documentary and saw they had a great kind of approach to making 'Good Vibrations.' We wanted to approach 'Club Foot' the same way, to mess with the landscape and give the listener something to hold on to."

MTV.com described the song as "a quilt of relentless beats, hissing electronic noises, a buzzing guitar riff and Meighan's breathless, menacing vocals." The Morning Call said it "piles layers and layers of synths atop tight guitar work before coming to a fluttering, flutey end."

== Music video ==
The video of this song, directed by W.I.Z. and featuring Russian actress Dinara Drukarova (who subsequently returns in the UK music video for their follow-up single "L.S.F.", also directed by W.I.Z.) is dedicated to Czech student Jan Palach who in 1969 set himself on fire in protest against renewed Soviet suppression of Czechoslovakia. The video also refers to the Soviet government's intervention in the Hungarian Revolution of 1956 on a banner showing the text in Hungarian (Szabad Európa Rádió), which translates as "Radio Free Europe/Radio Liberty". The scene with the inspector girl who stands before the tank harks back to the young man who stood in front of the line of tanks in 1989 in Tiananmen Square, which itself has become an icon for resistance.

Chris Edwards is seen playing guitar in the video, as he swapped instruments with Christopher Karloff in live performances, though the actual guitar tracks were played by Pizzorno and Karloff. A drum kit can be seen in a couple of shots, although it is unclear who is depicted playing them.

== Track listing ==
=== CD ===
- PARADISE08
1. Club Foot – 2:52
2. Club Foot (Jagz Kooner Vocal Mix) – 4:53
3. Trash Can – 2:53
4. Sand Clit – 3:53

== Personnel ==
- Tom Meighan – lead vocals
- Sergio Pizzorno – guitar, synths, backing vocals
- Christopher Karloff – guitar, bass, synths

== Reissue ==
"Club Foot (re-release)"

Single by Kasabian

from the album Kasabian
- B-side: "The Duke"; "Bang"
- Released: 21 March 2005
- Recorded: 2004
- Genre: Indie rock; alternative rock; post-punk revival; space rock
- Length: 2:51
- Label: Columbia
- Songwriters: Christopher Karloff; Sergio Pizzorno
- Producers: Jim Abbiss; Kasabian

Kasabian singles chronology
"Cutt Off" (2005)	"Club Foot (re-release)" (2005)	"Empire" (2006)

"Club Foot" is a reissued single from Kasabian. The single entered the UK Chart at No. 19 in 2004, and at No. 21 in 2005. In 2005 it also peaked No. 27 in US Modern Rock Tracks, the same position in the same chart reached in 2011 with the single version contained in Live!, recorded at The O2 Arena in London on 15 December 2011. The Maxi CD includes two new B-sides and a remix of "Club Foot", while the 2-track CD contains a live version of non-album track "55".

=== Track listing ===
==== Maxi CD ====
- PARADISE30
1. Club Foot – 2:51
2. The Duke – 3:35
3. Bang – 3:05
4. Club Foot (Jimmy Douglass Remix) – 3:21
5. CD-rom with Club Foot promo video + Club Foot Live @ Brixton Academy video

==== Mini CD ====
- PARADISE29
1. Club Foot – 2:51
2. 55 (Live @ Brixton Academy) – 4:23

==== 10" Vinyl ====
- PARADISE31
1. Club Foot – 2:51
2. 55 (Live @ Brixton Academy) – 4:23
3. Club Foot (Jimmy Douglass Remix) – 3:21

==== Australian EP ====
- 82876659622
1. Club Foot – 2:51
2. Reason Is Treason – 3:44
3. Trash Can – 2:53

[Notes: Red Digipak]

== Charts ==
Chart (2004)	Peak position
UK Singles Chart	19

Chart (2005)	Peak position
UK Singles Chart	21
US Alternative Airplay (Billboard)	27

== Certifications ==
Region	Certification	Certified units/sales
United Kingdom (BPI)	Platinum	600,000^{‡}
^{‡} Sales+streaming figures based on certification alone.
