= L.S.F. (song) =

2004 single by Kasabian

Single by Kasabian

from the album Kasabian
- B-side: "Lab Twat"; "Doctor Zapp"
- Released: 9 August 2004
- Genre: Indie rock; neo-psychedelia; space rock
- Length: 3:19
- Label: RCA
- Songwriters: Christopher Karloff; Sergio Pizzorno
- Producers: Jim Abbiss; Kasabian

Kasabian singles chronology
"Club Foot" (2004)	"L.S.F." (2004)	"Processed Beats" (2004)

Music videos
- "L.S.F." (UK version) on YouTube; "L.S.F." (US version) on YouTube

"L.S.F." (or "L.S.F. (Lost Souls Forever)") is the second single by the British rock group Kasabian. It was the band's first UK Top 10 hit, peaking at No. 10 and staying in the Top 75 for five weeks. The song also charted in the United States, peaking at No. 32 on Billboard's Alternative Songs chart.

The song first appeared in October 2003 in the video game FIFA Football 2004, but the single was released in August 2004.

In May 2007, NME magazine placed "LSF" at number 37 in its list of the 50 Greatest Indie Anthems Ever.

The drums on this track are played by Martin Hall-Adams, as permanent drummer Ian Matthews did not join until midway through the album's recording sessions. Lead guitarist Christopher Karloff fills in as the drummer in the UK music video, directed by W.I.Z. (in his second video with the band) and featuring Russian actress Dinara Drukarova (reprising her role from the video for their previous single "Club Foot", also directed by W.I.Z.). The US music video, directed by Australian production company AV Club, features all five members at the time and is their only video to do so besides "Processed Beats".

== Background ==
According to The Telegraph, the song is "articulating a mood of fear and paranoia surrounding terrorism and the Iraq war, with its chorus couplet of 'We got our backs to the wall / Watch out, they're gonna kill us all.'"

In 2006, bassist Chris Edwards said, "The first LP had military imagery because we were writing it as shit was happening abroad with the army. You’d go down the shops and see ‘THE TROOPS ARE ON FIRE’ in the paper and Serge wrote the lyrics and took influence from this. We weren’t for it or against. We just wrote about what was going on."

About this song, guitarist Serge Pizzorno said,

The message is to enjoy your life while you've got it. The world is insane and music's maybe the last pure thing we've got, the one thing that can bring people together. When we play that song in the set you can hear that chant coming from the crowd and it's louder than us. It's hands in the air and it's like we're all in it together. It doesn't matter if you're the President of the United States or Jim from Sunderland, we're all at risk, so while you're here, sing a song.

== Reception ==
The Austin Chronicle said, "Both 'L.S.F. (Lost Souls Forever)' and the sweeping 'U Boat' feel stadium-ready, with massive backswells of low-end punch overlaid with Tom Meighan's monotonic snarl and Sergio Pizzorno's swirling guitars and electronics."

== Track listing ==
=== Maxi CD ===
- PARADISE14
1. L.S.F. – 3:19
2. Lab Twat – 3:17
3. Doctor Zapp – 3:32
4. L.S.F. (Jagz Kooner Mix Edit) — 3:14
5. CD-Rom with L.S.F video

=== Mini CD ===
- PARADISE13
1. L.S.F. – 3:19
2. L.S.F. (Jagz Kooner Mix Edit) – 3:14

=== Japan CD ===
- BVCP-29045
1. L.S.F. – 3:21
2. Lab Twat – 3:20
3. Doctor Zapp – 3:34
4. L.S.F. (Jagz Kooner Mix Edit) — 3:13
5. Club Foot (Live in Tokyo at Summer Sonic Festival, 8 August 2004) – 4:12
6. CD-Rom with L.S.F video

=== 10" vinyl ===
- PARADISE15
1. L.S.F. (Album version) – 3:14
2. Club Foot (Live @ Cabinet War Rooms) – 4:14
3. L.S.F. (Jagz Kooner Mix - Full Version) – 7:06

== Personnel ==
- Tom Meighan – lead vocals
- Sergio Pizzorno – backing vocals, guitar, synths
- Christopher Karloff – lead guitar, synths, omnichord
- Chris Edwards – bass guitar
- Martin Hall-Adams – drums
- Damian Taylor – programming

== Covers ==
- Mark Ronson covered "L.S.F." on his album Version featuring Kasabian themselves.

== Charts ==
Chart (2004–2005)	Peak position
UK Singles (OCC)	10
US Alternative Airplay (Billboard)	32

== Certifications ==
Region	Certification	Certified units/sales
United Kingdom (BPI)	Gold	400,000^{‡}
^{‡} Sales+streaming figures based on certification alone.
