= Reason Is Treason =

Single by Kasabian

from the album Kasabian
- Released: February 2004
- Genre: Indie rock, alternative rock, space rock, electronic rock
- Length: 4:35
- Label: Columbia
- Songwriters: Sergio Pizzorno and Christopher Karloff
- Producers: Jacknife Lee, Kasabian

Kasabian singles chronology
"Processed Beats (Demo)" (2003)	"Reason Is Treason" (2004)	"Club Foot" (2004)

"Reason Is Treason" is the second single release from British rock band Kasabian. As a limited release it was ineligible for chart entry.

The 10" release was packaged with a Kasabian stencil secured with two elastic bands. The promo CD was wrapped in brown paper with the Kasabian logo stencilled on the front. As the Kasabian website says that the 10" stencils are used, it is assumable that the stencils were sprayed on the CD promos and then packaged with the vinyl. Both versions feature the Jacknife Lee mix of the song as opposed to the album version.

The track was used as the main title for ITV 4’s coverage of the Isle of Man TT, it played theme to Major League Baseball 2K8 as part of its soundtrack. A small section of the song was also used in the opening scene of Lara Croft: Tomb Raider – The Cradle of Life, and was featured on the film soundtrack album. The song is featured as the opening theme song and soundtrack to the UK version of Gran Turismo 4 (along with part of the orchestral version of Moon Over the Castle).

== Track listing ==
=== 10" Vinyl ===
- PARADISE04
1. "Reason Is Treason" – 4:35

=== Promo CD ===
- PARADISE03
1. "Reason Is Treason" – 4:35

== Personnel ==
- Tom Meighan – lead vocals
- Sergio Pizzorno – vocals, rhythm guitar, synths
- Christopher Karloff – lead guitar, bass, synths, omnichord
- Ryan Glover – drums
- Jacknife Lee – remix
