= Kasabian =

English rock band

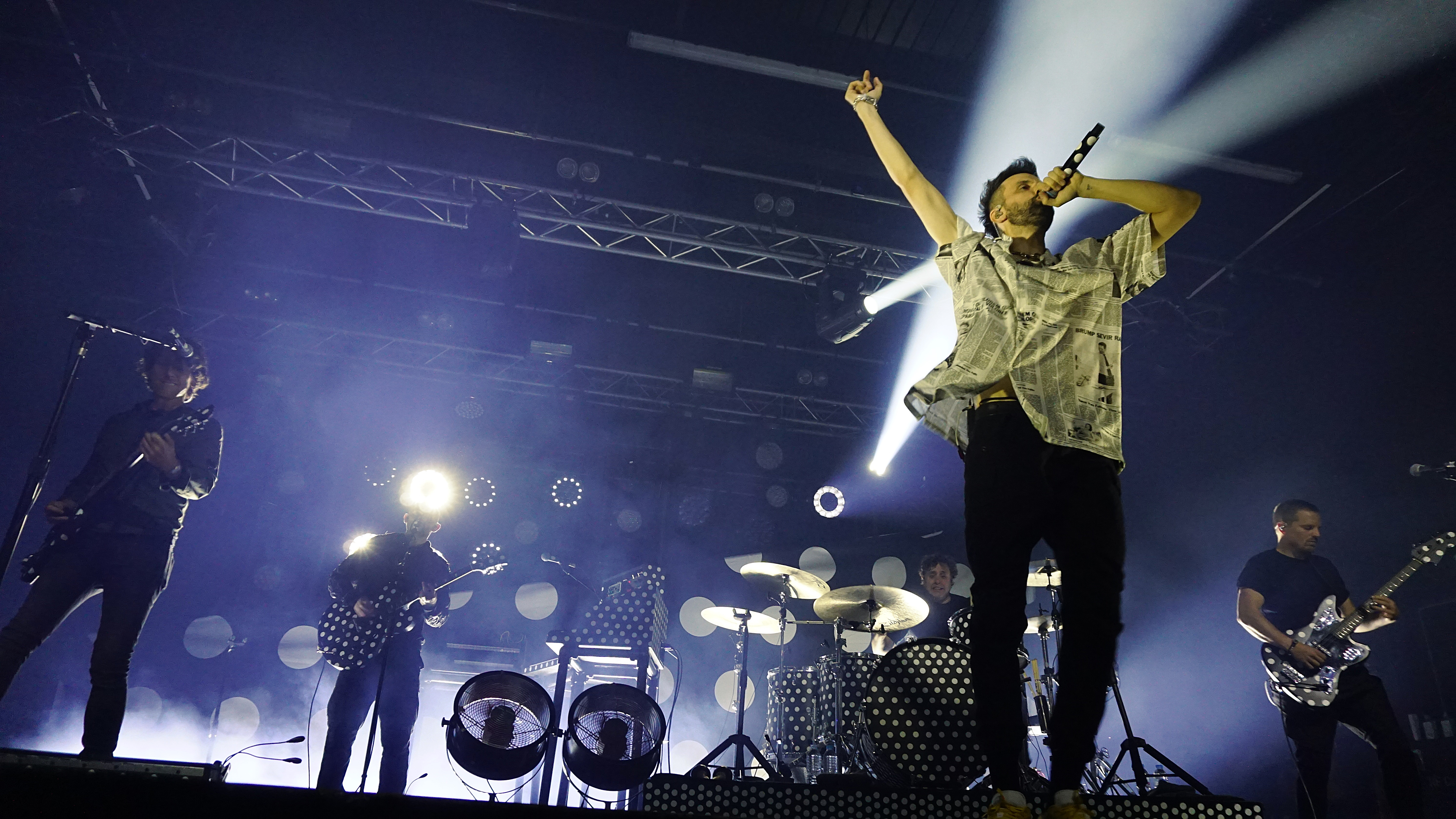
- Kasabian performing at The Engine Shed, Lincoln in 2021

Background information
- Also known as: Saracuse
- Origin: Leicester, England
- Genres: Indie rock; alternative rock; electronica; electronic rock; space rock
- Years active: 1997–present
- Labels: Columbia; Sony; RCA
- Spinoffs: Black Onassis; Loose Tapestries; The S.L.P.
- Members: Sergio Pizzorno; Chris Edwards; Ian Matthews; Tim Carter
- Past members: Chris Karloff; Tom Meighan
- Website: kasabian.co.uk

Kasabian (/kəˈseɪbiən/ kə-SAY-bee-ən) are an English rock band formed in Leicester in 1997 by lead vocalist Tom Meighan, guitarist and second vocalist Sergio Pizzorno, guitarist Chris Karloff and bassist Chris Edwards. Drummer Ian Matthews joined in 2004. Karloff left the band in 2006 and founded a new band called Black Onassis. Jay Mehler joined as touring lead guitarist in 2006, leaving for Liam Gallagher's Beady Eye in 2013, to be replaced by Tim Carter, who later became a full-time band member in 2021. Meighan left the band in July 2020, with Pizzorno stepping up as full-time lead vocalist.

In 2010 and 2014, Kasabian won the Q Awards for Best Act in the World Today. They were named Best Live Act at the 2014 Q Awards and the 2007 and 2018 NME Awards. The band's music is often described as indie rock, but Pizzorno has said he "hates indie bands" and does not feel Kasabian fit into that category.

Kasabian have released nine studio albums – Kasabian (2004), Empire (2006), West Ryder Pauper Lunatic Asylum (2009), Velociraptor! (2011), 48:13 (2014), For Crying Out Loud (2017), The Alchemist's Euphoria (2022), Happenings (2024) and Act III (2026). The band's music has been described as a mix of The Stone Roses and Primal Scream with the swagger of Oasis. Their music has won them several awards and recognition in the media, including a Brit Award in 2010 for Best British Group, and their live performances have received praise, the most notable of which was their appearance as headliners at the 2014 Glastonbury Festival.

== History ==
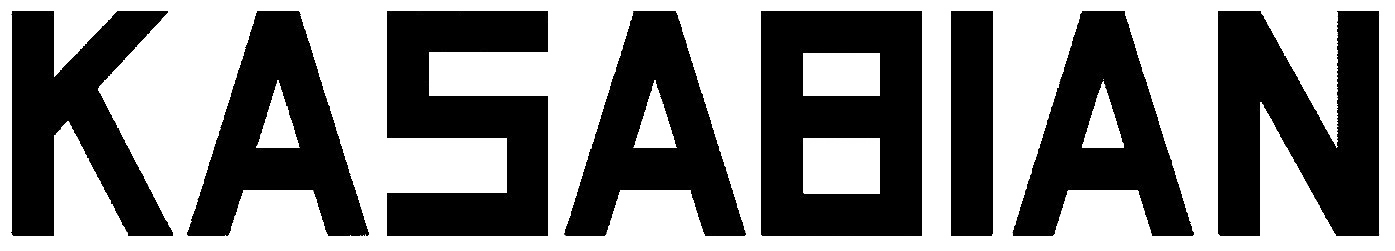
The band's logo

=== 1997–2002: Early years ===
The band was formerly called Saracuse. They started recording at Bedrock Studios in Leicester where Chris Edwards had once worked as a sound engineer before moving into the telecommunications and data industry where he was employed by Bedrock's parent company, Micina Technologies Group. The original band members came from Countesthorpe and Blaby, and the band formed while Pizzorno, Meighan and Edwards were attending Countesthorpe Community College. The first demo EP was produced by Scott Gilbert and handed to the band on 24 December 1998. Three songs were recorded live: "Whats Going On", "Life of Luxury" and "Shine On". Their first public appearance was at the Vipers Rugby Club to celebrate Edwards' 18th birthday with family and friends. Saracuse had several tracks included on a triple CD album called RED which was produced by Bedrock Studios and showcased Leicester bands in late 1999. They were also invited to take part in the event of the same name at Leicester De Montfort Hall later the same year but declined following the advice of their then-manager Allan Royland. The band was signed to BMG by London DJ and producer Sam Young and changed their name to Kasabian, after Linda Kasabian, a member of the Charles Manson cult who later went on to testify against Manson at his trial. In an interview with Ukula, bassist Chris Edwards explained how former guitarist Chris Karloff picked the name. Reading up on Charles Manson, the Kasabian name stuck with Karloff. "He just thought the word was cool... so it was decided", says Edwards. Kasabian is a common Armenian surname, from the dialectal Armenian ղասաբ ġasab taken from Arabic (Arabic: قصّاب, romanized: ḳaṣṣāb) "butcher" and the patronymic ending յան -yan. Sam Young had been working at Concept Music, a small independent label, when the band's manager left the Saracuse demo on his desk. Concept wanted to sign the band and a two-single deal was offered. However, Young did not take over managerial duties and did not solely get them signed instantly to BMG. EMI were interested in the band as well.

=== 2003–2005: Kasabian ===
Their eponymous debut album was released in the UK on 13 September 2004, receiving good sales and generally positive reviews. During the recording, the band lived in a farmhouse near Rutland Water to avoid being disturbed. Kasabian featured at Glastonbury Festival 2005 on the "Other Stage".

Despite having two prior single releases with debut single "Processed Beats" and lead single "Reason Is Treason", it was their third single release "Club Foot" that gave Kasabian success in the UK Singles Chart. The song, which was written in the early years of Kasabian, went on to enjoy both critical and commercial success and has been performed at nearly every Kasabian live performance since its release.

During this period, various drummers played with Kasabian, including current keyboard player Ben Kealey, DJ Dan Ralph Martin, Martin Hall-Adams, brothers Mitch and Ryan Glovers and some others. While recording in Bristol, the band met Ian Matthews, who plays on "Processed Beats", "Butcher Blues", "Beneficial Herbs" and possibly some other songs on the debut album and B-sides. He was asked to tour with them in 2004 and became a permanent member in April 2005. The album was produced by Jim Abbiss.

=== 2006–2007: Empire and Karloff's departure ===
During the recording of Kasabian's second album, Empire, Christopher Karloff, one of the band's chief songwriters, had "artistic and creative differences" and was asked to leave the band, according to the band's website, although there is evidence to suggest that he left due to personal circumstances. In 2013 he confirmed that "differences in the musical direction and personal unresolved things" led to his departure. Ultimately, he contributed to three of the songs on Empire, including the self-titled first single.

The album, which was co-produced by Jim Abbiss, was released in the UK on 28 August 2006. "Empire" was released as the first single from the album and reached No. 9 on the UK Singles Chart "Shoot the Runner" reached No. 17 in the same chart. A third single, "Me Plus One", was released on 2 January 2007.

Kasabian won the Best Live Act award at the 2007 NME Awards. In April 2007, the band appeared on a pop soul remix of their 2004 hit "L.S.F." by DJ and producer Mark Ronson, appearing on his covers album Version.

=== 2008–2010: West Ryder Pauper Lunatic Asylum ===
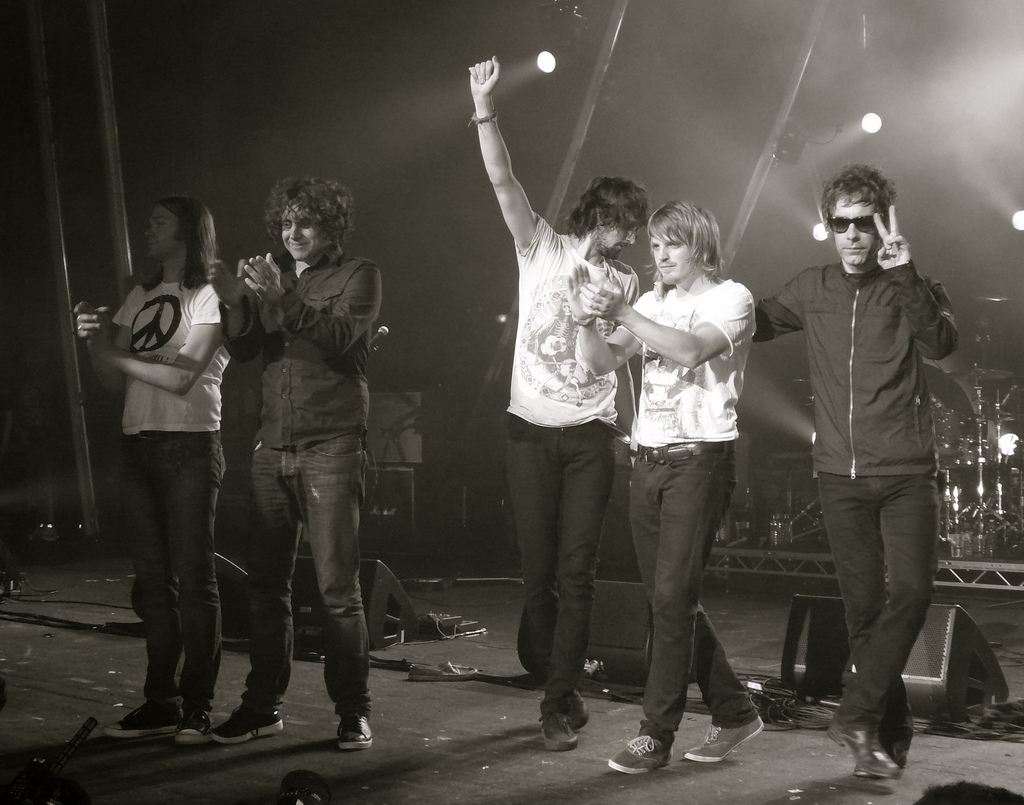
Kasabian in 2009

The band released an EP titled Fast Fuse in late 2007 which featured the songs "Fast Fuse" and "Thick as Thieves". Both tracks are featured in their third album.

Kasabian started work on their third album in late 2007 with producer Dan the Automator. On 5 March 2009, it was revealed that the album title would be West Ryder Pauper Lunatic Asylum, with a release date of 8 June 2009. The song "Vlad the Impaler" was released as a free download for a period of 4 days, as a preview for the album. The promo video for "Vlad the Impaler" stars Noel Fielding of The Mighty Boosh. Fielding is a fan of Kasabian and appeared in an NME cover with the band. The album's first single was the track "Fire", which was released on 1 June 2009, used as the theme song for the English Premier League from the 2010–11 season onward, and the song "Where Did All the Love Go?" was released as the second single. The third single "Underdog" was used in the mobile and PC game Asphalt 8: Airborne as well as in the movie Takers (2010). Underdog was also used in the 2009 TV advert for Sony Bravia 200hz televisions. The advert also featured Kaka, the world's most expensive footballer at the time.

On 14 June 2009, West Ryder Pauper Lunatic Asylum reached No. 1 in the UK Albums Chart, spending two weeks there. West Ryder Pauper Lunatic Asylum was shortlisted for the 2009 Mercury Prize and named "Best Album" at the 2009 Q Awards. The band won "Best Group" at the 2010 Brit Awards. At the 2010 Q Awards the band won the "Best Act in the World Today".

The first three albums were released as a box-set called The Albums in 2010.

=== 2011–2012: Velociraptor! ===
Kasabian started work on their fourth album, Velociraptor!, in November 2010 with Dan the Automator as producer. It was revealed in a number of interviews that some songs were already written. One track, titled "Green Fairy", which featured on the London Boulevard soundtrack, is present on the record under the name "La Fée Verte", but the album version is different from the soundtrack version. In June 2011, Kasabian closed the Isle of Wight Festival. They also headlined Rockness festival and played at Rock Werchter in July 2011. The band confirmed that the album would be released on 19 September 2011.

"Switchblade Smiles", the first song to be heard from Velociraptor!, was exclusively played on UK radio on 7 June 2011 during Zane Lowe's show on BBC Radio 1. The title and release date of the fourth album was also confirmed on the show. This first single from the album was available for visitors to listen to on the Kasabian website and was available as a download for people who pre-order the album. Two tracks from the album ("Velociraptor" and "Switchblade Smiles") were premièred throughout the four-date warm-up tour including playing at the Leeds O2 Academy before the RockNess and Isle of Wight festivals in June 2011. A track from the album "Days Are Forgotten" was due for radio release on 22 July 2011. However, it surfaced online the night before. The album failed to crack the Billboard Top 200 chart upon its first week of release in the United States.

On 27 November 2011, Kasabian performed "Goodbye Kiss" during the BBC's Formula 1 2011 closing season montage. In the same month, the band went on a full tour of the UK, including two sold-out gigs at the Capital FM Arena in Nottingham, supported at the shows by Miles Kane and Australian band ME. On 31 December 2011, Kasabian played a New Year's Eve concert entitled NYE:Rewired at the O2 Arena, London. The event was streamed live on YouTube.

Following early 2012 dates in Japan, Australia and Europe, Kasabian launched their North American leg in Dallas on 12 March, with 19 dates in U.S. and Canada until late April. It was announced on 16 May on the Kasabian website that their show of 15 December 2011, that was filmed at the O2 in London, would be screened in over 60 cinemas in the UK and Ireland on 30 May 2012. The film, titled Kasabian Live! Live at the O2 is distributed by Altive Media and Eagle Vision. On 29 June 2012, Kasabian performed at the Main Square festival in Arras France. At the end of the set, Tom Meighan returned to the stage without the band and performed the Beatles "She Loves You" unaccompanied, something that he had also done three days earlier in Athens, Greece, and on 16 June in Denmark at the NorthSide Festival. On 8 July 2012, the band headlined the UK festival T in the Park. Kasabian also headlined the Reading and Leeds Festivals on 24 and 25 August 2012.

=== 2013–2015: 48:13 ===
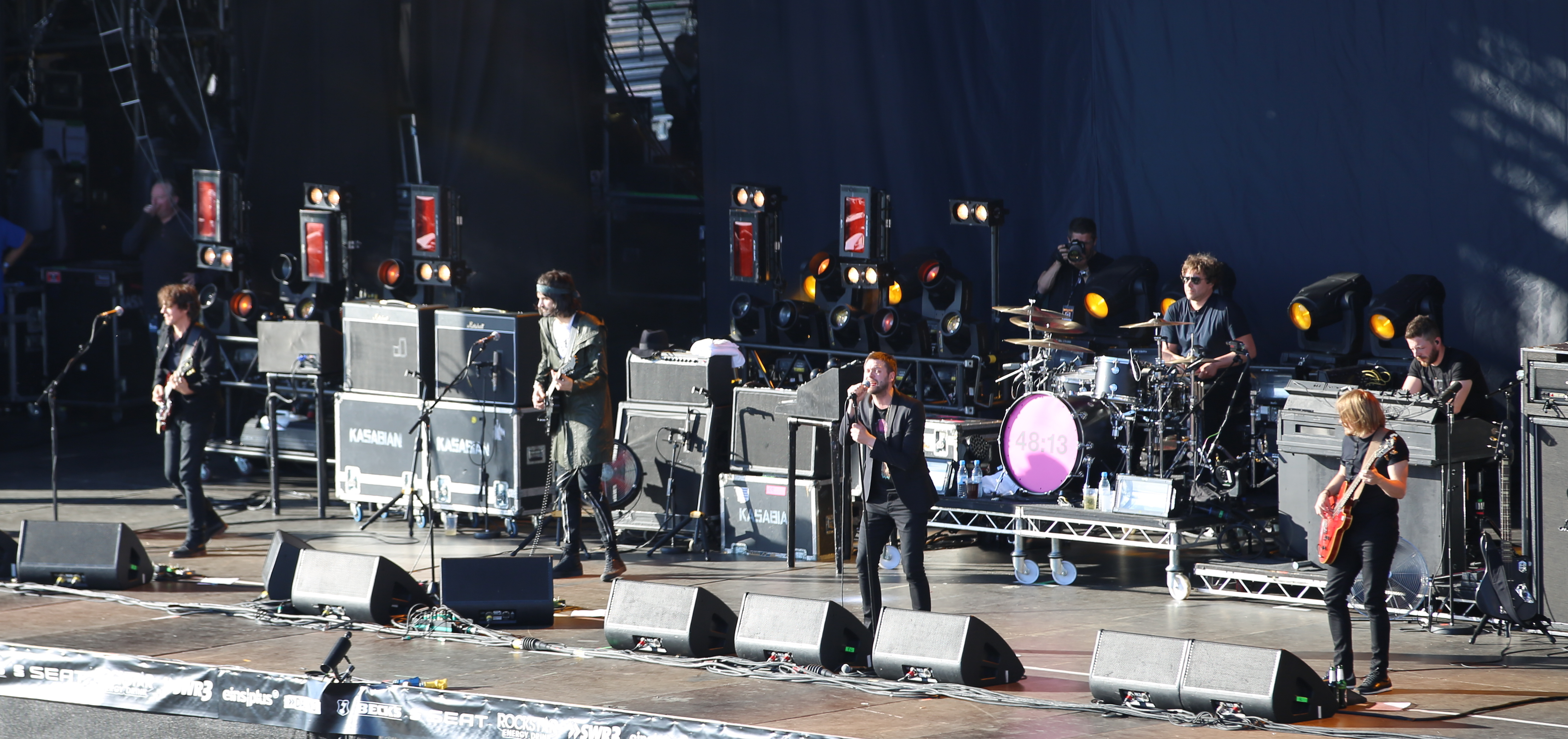
Kasabian performing at Rock am Ring 2014

In March 2013, Sergio Pizzorno confirmed via Facebook that touring rhythm guitarist Jay Mehler had left Kasabian to join Liam Gallagher's new band Beady Eye as a touring bass guitarist. Tim Carter joined Kasabian as a touring guitarist, first performing with the band on 6 March 2013 at Russell Brand's Give It Up for Comic Relief, comedy and music gig at Wembley Arena. Carter is a music engineering producer and assistant to Dan the Automator, who co-produced West Ryder Pauper Lunatic Asylum and Velociraptor!.

Following a handful of gigs and festival performances throughout the year, Kasabian posted a teaser video in November 2013, announcing that they had been working on new material for the previous six months. The album was produced by Sergio Pizzorno. They also announced that they would be playing a homecoming gig in Victoria Park, Leicester to 60,000 people in June 2014, around the ten year anniversary of their debut album. On 4 April 2014, Kasabian were confirmed to be headlining the Pyramid Stage at Glastonbury Festival 2014 on 29 June 2014.

On 28 April 2014, the band revealed that the album would be titled 48:13 and released on 9 June 2014. The lead single to promote the album, "Eez-eh", was released on 29 April 2014. "Eez-eh" was performed at Glastonbury Festival 2014 alongside other tracks from 48:13 and previous albums. The show also featured two cover versions – "Crazy", originally recorded by Gnarls Barkley, and "Praise You" by Fatboy Slim, which has been used as an intro to their song "L.S.F.".

At the NME Awards 2015 Kasabian were nominated for 9 awards, beating the 2009 Oasis record (7 nominations).

=== 2016–2021: For Crying Out Loud and Meighan's departure ===
In 2016, the band played a short tour in May, culminating in two concerts at Leicester City Football Club's ground, the King Power Stadium, to celebrate the club winning the Premier League. At the first of these two concerts, Kasabian debuted a new song, "Put Your Life On It", dedicated to the city and those who are no longer with us to see the city's recent sporting achievements, accompanied by a gospel choir from De Montfort University. They also performed a short set in Leicester's Victoria Park, as part of Leicester City's victory parade on 16 May. Numerous inspirations for the sixth album also have been listed, including Nirvana, Bruce Springsteen, David Bowie and Claudio Ranieri. On 8 September, it was confirmed that "Comeback Kid" will be featured on the soundtrack of EA Sports game FIFA 17. In December 2016, the group were rumoured to be playing Reading and Leeds Festival the following year, but insisted that "the band are currently finishing their new album". The band played the Reading and Leeds Festival in August 2017, as well as several other festivals that year.

In a January 2017 interview with NME, Pizzorno revealed that the upcoming album would contain a track called "Bless This Acid House", which, in his opinion, is one of the best songs he has written.

In March 2017, it was confirmed that the band's sixth album would be titled For Crying Out Loud, and released in May of that year. The album cover features a photograph of the band's guitar technician Rick Graham. The band embarked on a world tour in support, that included performances at the Reading and Leeds Festivals and headlining TRNSMT in Glasgow.

In July 2020, it was announced that Meighan was stepping down from Kasabian by mutual consent due to personal issues. It would soon emerge that Meighan had assaulted his then-fiancée in April; he was later to appear in court in July. In light of these revelations, the band stated that they had decided to sever their professional relationship with Meighan.

Following Meighan's sacking, remaining band founders Pizzorno and Chris Edwards met to discuss Kasabian's future. They decided that the band should continue, and after considering the possibility of recruiting a new singer, Pizzorno felt it would be best if he took on the role himself. In late October 2020, the remaining band members issued a media statement confirming both Meighan's permanent dismissal from the band and his termination as a partner in their touring and merchandising companies.

On 28 May 2021, Kasabian announced an October tour of the UK, their first since Meighan's departure, with Pizzorno assuming all lead vocal duties and touring guitarist Tim Carter becoming a full-time member of the band. The new-look Kasabian made its debut in Glasgow on 13 October, with the band now joined by Robert Harvey of the Music as a multi-instrumentalist and backing vocalist.

On 1 October 2021, Liam Gallagher announced that Kasabian would be supporting him at Knebworth Park on 3 and 4 June 2022. The band also supported Gallagher at Hampden Park on 26 June that same year.

=== 2021–2022: The Alchemist's Euphoria ===
On 27 October 2021, Kasabian released their first single in over four years, "Alygatyr". On 6 May 2022, a second single "Scriptvre" was released, along with a music video and the announcement of their seventh album The Alchemist's Euphoria, which was released on 12 August. On 3 June 2022, the day that Kasabian played at Knebworth Park as support act for Liam Gallagher, they released the third single "Chemicals" along with a lyric video and, on 20 June 2022, a music video.

The Alchemist's Euphoria topped the UK Albums Chart, and despite polarising fan reception, it was generally praised by critics.

=== 2023–2024: Happenings ===
On 16 June 2023, Kasabian released "Algorithms", the lead single for their next record which would be released the following year. Commenting on the song, frontman Pizzorno said "robots can't experience emotion and being in the moment, whereas humans can, and that is the beauty that separates us". In December 2023, Kasabian announced a homecoming show at Victoria Park in Leicester, titled Summer Solstice II in July 2024. It follows the band's first performance at the park back in 2014, their first since 2016.

On 21 February 2024, Kasabian announced their eighth studio album, Happenings and released "Call", the album's second single following "Algorithms". In an interview with Rolling Stone discussing their upcoming album, frontman Serge Pizzorno added "thinking about where we are with phone screens, us being able to create something that people can be a part of in the real world has got to be a positive. I've seen it in people's faces at the shows, that need to experience something that just snaps you out for yourself, to feel a connection. Well, that's Happenings". On 12 April 2024, Kasabian released the "summer-ready" single "Coming Back to Me Good".

On 21 June 2024, the band released the last single from Happenings, "Darkest Lullaby". Just over a week later, they played a surprise set at Glastonbury Festival 2024 on the Woodsies stage. Happenings was released on 5 July 2024 to generally favourable reviews, with the album being described as "joyous" and "punchy". It debuted at No. 1 on the UK Albums Chart.

=== 2025–present: Act III ===
On 22 September 2025, Kasabian released "Hippie Sunshine", the first single taken from their ninth album, Act III. Alongside this, the band announced their biggest London show set to take place at Finsbury Park on 4 July 2026. In February 2026, the band released a collaboration single with Calvin Harris, "Release the Pressure". on 2 April 2026, the second single from the album, "GREAT PRETENDER", was released. Two days later they performed both songs as the musical guest for the third episode of Saturday Night Live UK, hosted by Riz Ahmed. Act III was released on 4 September 2026, which became the band's eighth UK number one album.

== Band members ==
=== Current members ===
==== Current official members ====
| Image | Name | Years active | Instruments | Release contributions |
|---|---|---|---|---|
| | Sergio Pizzorno | 1997–present | lead vocals; rhythm guitar; keyboards; percussion; electronic programming; backing vocals (1997–2020); lead guitar (2006–2021); occasional bass (2004–present) | all releases |
| | Chris Edwards | 1997–present | bass; occasional keyboards; backing vocals (2017–present); occasional rhythm guitar (2004–2007) | all releases |
| | Ian Matthews | 2005–present (touring and session musician 2004–2005) | drums; percussion | all releases |
| | Tim Carter | 2021–present (touring and session musician 2013–2021) | lead guitar; keyboards; backing vocals; bass (studio 2022–present) | all releases from West Ryder Pauper Lunatic Asylum (2009) onwards, except iTunes Live: London Festival '09 (2009), iTunes Festival: London 2011 (2011), Live! (2012) |

==== Current touring musicians ====
| Image | Name | Years active | Instruments | Release contributions |
|---|---|---|---|---|
| | Gary Alesbrook | 2006–present | trumpet | Empire (2006); iTunes Live: London Festival '07 (2007); Fast Fuse (2007); West Ryder EP (2009); iTunes Live: London Festival '09 (2009); Velociraptor! (2011); iTunes Festival: London 2011 (2011); Live! (2012); 48:13 (2014); For Crying Out Loud (2017) |
| | Robert Harvey | 2021–present | guitar; synthesizers; vocals | Happenings (2024) |

=== Former members ===
==== Former official members ====
| Image | Name | Years active | Instruments | Release contributions |
|---|---|---|---|---|
| | Tom Meighan | 1997–2020 | lead and backing vocals; occasional guitar; percussion | all releases from Kasabian (2004) to For Crying Out Loud (2017) |
| | Christopher "Chris" Karloff | 1997–2006 | lead guitar; bass; keyboards; electronic programming; drums; percussion (1997–2004) | Kasabian (2004); Live from Brixton Academy (2005) |

==== Former session and touring musicians ====
| Image | Name | Years active | Instruments | Release contributions |
|---|---|---|---|---|
| | Ben Kealey | 2003–2004; 2006–2021 | keyboards; piano; backing vocals; drums (2003–2004) | all releases from iTunes Live: London Festival '07 (2007) to For Crying Out Loud (2017) except Discover Kasabian (2008) |
| | Ryan Glover | 2004 | drums | Kasabian (2004) |
| | Mitch Glover | 2004 | drums | Kasabian (2004) |
| | Daniel "Dan" Ralph Martin | 2004 | drums; guitar; piano | Kasabian (2004); West Ryder Pauper Lunatic Asylum (2009); Velociraptor! (2011) |
| | Martin Hall-Adams | 2004 | drums | Kasabian (2004) |
| | Jason "Jay" Mehler | 2006–2012 | lead guitar | iTunes Live: London Festival '07 (2007); Fast Fuse (2007); West Ryder EP (2009); West Ryder Pauper Lunatic Asylum (2009); Velociraptor! (2011); iTunes Festival: London 2011 (2011); Live! (2012) |

== Discography ==
- Kasabian (2004)
- Empire (2006)
- West Ryder Pauper Lunatic Asylum (2009)
- Velociraptor! (2011)
- 48:13 (2014)
- For Crying Out Loud (2017)
- The Alchemist's Euphoria (2022)
- Happenings (2024)
- Act III (2026)
