= Ian Matthews (drummer) =

English drummer (born 1971)

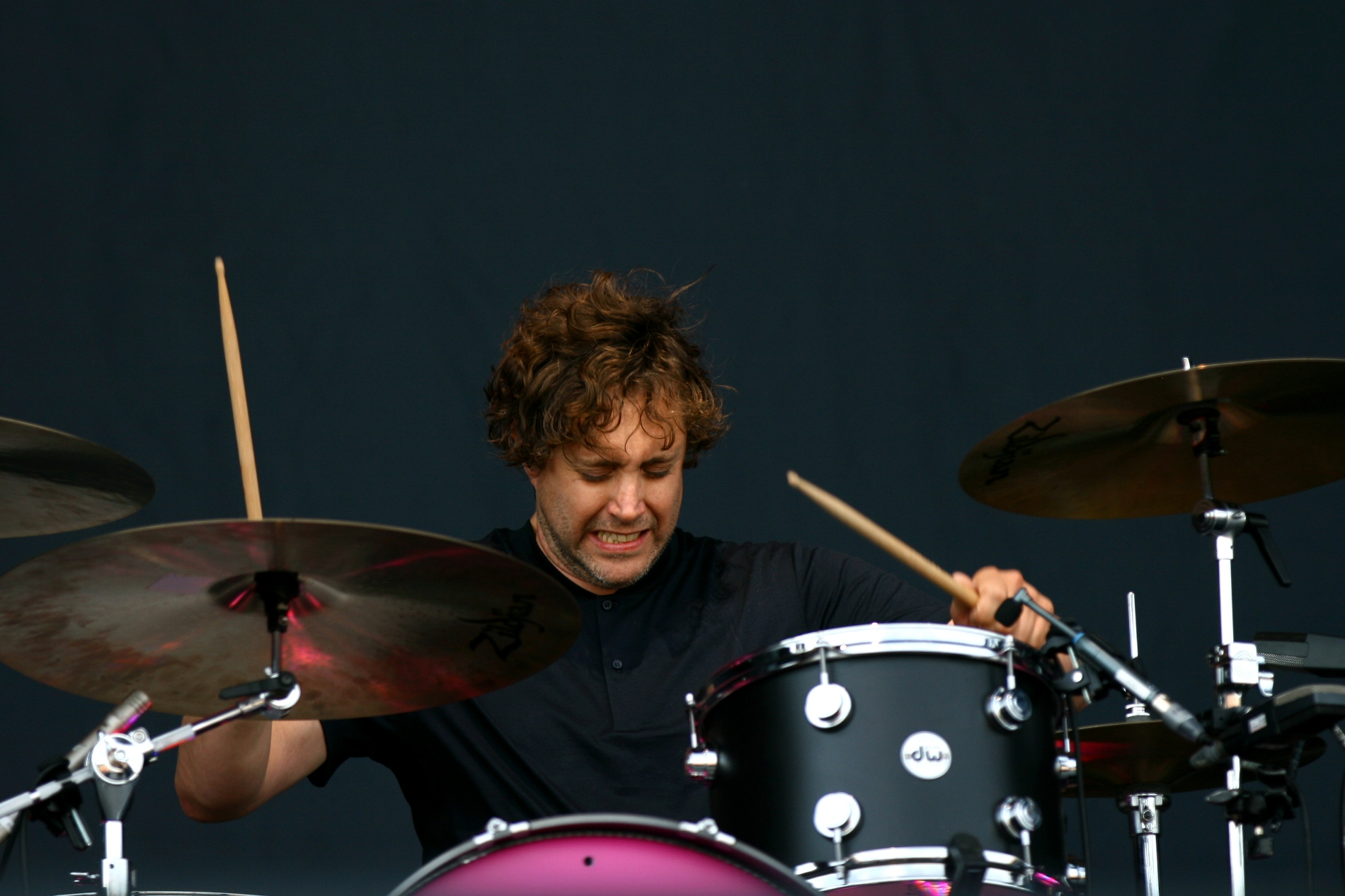
- Matthews performing with Kasabian at Rock im Park Festival 2014

Background information
- Born: 20 June 1971 (age 55); Bristol, England
- Genres: Jazz; rock
- Occupation: Drummer
- Website: kasabian.co.uk

Ian Matthews (born 20 June 1971) is an English musician, best known as the drummer for the rock band Kasabian.

== Early career ==
Matthews interest in drums was first started by his babysitter, a friend of his dad, whose family had a drumkit, he also played piano as his dad was a pianist but "realised that I wasn’t interested" He also took drum lessons from a local session drummer who taught him to play in a jazz style with brushes. Matthews played his first gig with his dad’s social club gig when their drummer was ill, he "got £5. From that point I was hooked"

Matthews played gigs with his dad for several years during school and then joined a Bristol drum corps called The Troopers when he was ten, he also did some school orchestras and played in the band of the Avon and Somerset fire brigade, playing military type drumming and lots of reading. He also did wedding gigs and jazz gigs.

== Career ==
Matthews started his career when a teacher told him "If I wanna get on the scene I needed to make sure to make friends and connect to as many engineers as possible. That’s where you meet the musicians who are doing stuff and where you get a call of people who need a drummer." He got work in a studio ran by a friend of a friend called big bonk where he used to be a session drummer, one group that recorded at that studio was Kasabian who had some money to spend on a drummer and were recommended Matthews. Before his first session with the band he sprained his ankle and almost cancelled but continued to do the session in pain, the band were "blown away" and Matthews did some more session with the band after that.

Matthews didn't join Kasabian straight away in 2002 as he had other commitments but he was later called up in 2004 and became a full band member in 2005. Prior to Kasabian, Matthews played with a number of noted local Bristol bands, such as K-Passa, CCQ, and Sissi.

When not touring or recording with Kasabian, he often plays small jazz/funk gigs in and around Bristol. He has recorded with Bristol artist James Morton's Porkchop on Don't You Worry 'Bout That album.

He cites Mitch Mitchell, Tony Williams and Buddy Rich as his strongest drumming influences.

In 2015, Matthews joined with Al Murray, Keith Keough, Stuart Warmington and Al Kitching in founding the British Drum Company.

Matthews continues to tour with Kasabian and also does session work, appearing on the Cult's 2022 album Under the Midnight Sun.

== Drum kits ==
Matthews has used various drum kits and cymbals over the years. Currently he is using Gretsch Drums, Zildjian cymbals Remo Drum Heads, Vic Firth Sticks and Natal percussion.

== Trivia ==
Matthews is left-handed. He broke his left hand when touring with Kasabian in Europe in February 2010 and was replaced by his drum technician Laurie Jenkins for a show and the NME Awards performance of "Vlad the Impaler".

He got his first drum kit when he was four and by the time he was seven, he played his first gig in a pub and was capable of laying "a pretty good waltz, quickstep, foxtrot, and tango".

In addition to his work with Kasabian, he has also recorded drums on the following: Soundisciples - Audio Manifesto (2002), Ilya - They Died for Beauty (2003), Bruce Parry Presents Amazon Tribe: Songs for Survival - track 9 with Skin at Robot Club feat. the Adi Tribe - "Simmer Down" (2008), BBC Earth Unplugged series Earth Files Ep2 "Salmon Strike" and Ep5 "Xmas Special" (2012), soundtrack to I Give It a Year (2013) and on the soundtrack to Fast and Furious 6 (2013).
