= Life in the Wires =

Studio album by Frost*
- Released: 18 October 2024
- Genre: Neo-prog
- Length: 42:29 (Disc 1); 43:19 (Disc 2)
- Label: InsideOut

Frost* chronology
Day and Age (2021)	Life in the Wires (2024)

Life in the Wires is the fifth studio album by the British neo-prog group Frost*. It marks the return of drummer Craig Blundell for his first appearance since Falling Satellites (2016).

== Production and concept ==
This album is a continuation from their previous album Day and Age, the first track on this album starts with the end of the last track from previous album "Repeat to Fade," where the static comes up and a voice says "Can you hear me?”. The concept behind this album revolves around a central character Naio, a kid in a modern AI world, who discovers the voice of an old DJ on an ancient AM radio his mother had given him, which gets him off on a path of enlightenment.

== Track listing ==
Disc 1

1. "Skywaving" – 1:58
2. "Life in the Wires (Part 1)" – 5:29
3. "This House of Winter" – 6:09
4. "The Solid State Orchestra" – 6:38
5. "Evaporator" – 8:07
6. "Strange World" – 5:09
7. "Idiot Box" – 4:59
8. "Absent Friends" – 3:58

Disc 2

1. "School (Introducing the All Seeing Eye)" – 3:11
2. "Propergander" – 5:34
3. "Sign of Life" – 5:43
4. "Moral and Consequence" – 8:13
5. "Life in the Wires (Part 2)" – 15:51
6. "Starting Fires" – 4:44

== Personnel ==
Musicians

- Jem Godfrey – keyboards, guitar, vocals
- John Mitchell – electric guitar, vocals
- Nathan King – bass guitar
- Craig Blundell – drums

== Reception ==
Gary McKenzie of Louder Sound gave the album a score of 4 out of 5 stars, describing it as "elegant, complex, multilayered, brilliantly conceived and masterfully performed." Connor White of Sputnikmusic gave the album a score of 2.5 out of 5 stars. Robert Adams of Metal Talk gave the album a positive review, calling it "the perfect modern-sounding progressive rock album that you could wish for."
