= Witchazel =

Studio album by Matt Berry
- Released: 11 March 2009 (download); 7 March 2011 (CD, vinyl)
- Recorded: 2008
- Genre: Psychedelic pop; folk rock; progressive pop; psychedelic folk
- Length: 49:57
- Label: Acid Jazz
- Producer: Matt Berry

Matt Berry chronology
| Opium (2008) | Witchazel (2009) | Kill the Wolf (2013) |

Witchazel is the third studio album by English actor, comedian, and musician Matt Berry. It was originally released as a free download from his website on 11 March 2009, before being commercially released through Acid Jazz Records on 7 March 2011.

== Overview ==
Most instruments on the album are played by Berry, with fellow actor and comedian Peter Serafinowicz doing a Paul McCartney impression (under the name "Paul Mcartney") while providing backing vocals on "Rain Came Down". According to Berry, the album is about "the terrors of the countryside".

== In popular culture ==
The album's second track "Take My Hand" was used as the opening credits theme for Berry's comedy series Toast of London (2012–2015) and the closing credits theme of the Netflix documentary series American Murder: Gabby Petito (2025). In the two weeks following the airing of American Murder, the song was streamed in the U.S. over 579,000 times, representing a 1,505% increase in the song's streaming activity. Years before the song's release, an instrumental version was also used as a recurring motif in Berry's dark comedy series Snuff Box (2006).

== Track listing ==
All tracks are written by Matt Berry, unless noted.

| No. | Title | Writer(s) | Length |
|---|---|---|---|
| 1. | "An Awakening" | | 0:46 |
| 2. | "Take My Hand" | | 3:11 |
| 3. | "Accident at a Harvest Festival" | | 3:25 |
| 4. | "A Song for Rosie" | | 2:50 |
| 5. | "So Low" | | 3:16 |
| 6. | "Look in My Book" | | 2:26 |
| 7. | "The Pheasant" | | 8:42 |
| 8. | "Woman" | | 3:31 |
| 9. | "The Badger's Wake" | | 3:49 |
| 10. | "Rain Came Down (Featuring Paul Mcartney)" | | 4:12 |
| 11. | "From the Manger to the Mortuary / Recorder Dance" | Matt Berry, Cecilia Fage | 5:08 |
| 12. | "Into the Sky" | | 3:08 |
| 13. | "Roosting Time" | | 5:25 |
