= Craig Blundell =

British drummer (b.1973)

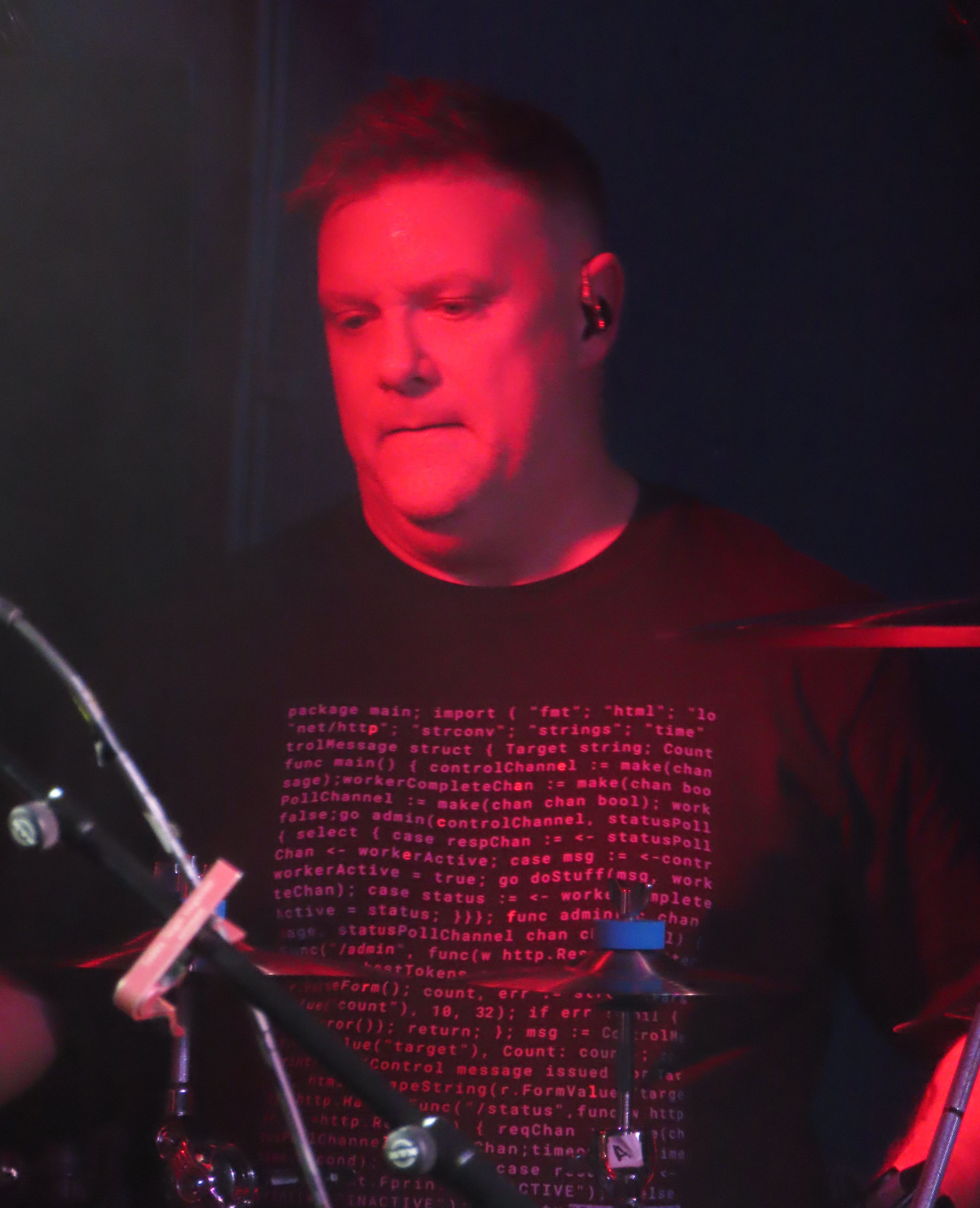
- Blundell performing in 2025

Background information
- Born: July 18, 1973 (age 52)
- Genres: Progressive rock
- Occupations: Musician; songwriter
- Instruments: Drums; percussion
- Years active: 1990s–present
- Member of: Kino; Frost*; Steven Wilson band; Steve Hackett band
- Website: craigblundell.com

Craig Blundell (born 18 July 1973) is a British drummer, who has toured with Steven Wilson and Steve Hackett. He is a member of progressive rock band Frost* from 2009 to 2019 and again since 2022. He is also been a member of the supergroup Kino, a band that includes Frost* guitarist John Mitchell alongside John Beck of It Bites and Pete Trewavas of Marillion, when they reformed in 2017.

== Biography ==
Blundell started playing drums at the age of three but considers his first serious experience with the drums was playing with the Royal Marines Corps at age sixteen. He cites his influences as Clive Deamer of Roni Size/Reprazent, Vinnie Colaiuta, Jeff Porcaro of Toto, Phil Collins of Genesis and Brand X, Billy Cobham, Michael Giles of King Crimson, Neil Peart of Rush, Terry Williams of Dire Straits, Dave Lombardo of Slayer and Clive Burr of Iron Maiden. He has played with members of King Crimson, Dire Straits, Genesis, Deep Purple, Iron Maiden, Porcupine Tree and Rainbow.

He first turned to a professional musician in 2008 after getting exposure by playing with Bruce Dickinson and Mike Rutherford of Genesis and Mike + the Mechanics on some sessions with Celine Dion before going "Back to the day job." He described his experience of the sessions with Rutherford as defining moment is his career as it taught him to refrain himself while drumming. He found himself gravitating towards progressive rock and was a fan of King Crimson and Yes, he received his big break when drummer Marco Minnemann mentioned his name when doing a gig with Joe Satriani which led to him getting a job with Steven Wilson of Porcupine Tree who he was a "massive" fan of. He was the last to be auditioned on the day and was recommended by former Porcupine Tree drummer Gavin Harrison as well as John Mitchell. His first tour with Wilson was in support of his album To The Bone in 2017.

In 2018, Blundell announced that he would be joining Steve Hackett on tour for the first time, replacing long-time drummer Gary O'Toole two weeks after his departure. The tour, called Selling England By The Pound tour, started soon after Blundell finished the To The Bone tour with Steven Wilson.

== Discography ==
| Year | Artist | Title | Cite |
|---|---|---|---|
| 2001 | David Knopfler | Wishbones | |
| 2002 | Dale Newman | Cubed | |
| 2013 | Frost* | The Rockfield Files | |
| 2014 | Pendragon | Men Who Climb Mountains | |
| 2014 | Uge | Nada Es Imposible | |
| 2015 | Lonely Robot | Please Come Home | |
| 2016 | Steven Wilson | 4½ | |
| 2016 | David Cross Band | Sign Of The Crow | |
| 2016 | Frost* | Falling Satellites | |
| 2016 | Steven Wilson | A Perfect Life At The Wiltern | |
| 2017 | Moonparticle | Hurricane Esmeralda | |
| 2017 | Lonely Robot | The Big Dream | |
| 2017 | Phil Lanzon | If You Think I'm Crazy | |
| 2017 | Steven Wilson | To the Bone | |
| 2018 | Kino | Radio Voltaire | |
| 2018 | Steven Wilson | How Big The Space | |
| 2018 | Matt Berry | Television Themes | |
| 2018 | David Cross & David Jackson | Another Day | |
| 2018 | Steven Wilson | Home Invasion: In Concert at the Royal Albert Hall | |
| 2018 | Semantic Saturation | Paradigms | |
| 2018 | Adam Holzman | Truth Decay | |
| 2019 | Lonely Robot | Under Stars | |
| 2019 | The Mute Gods | Atheists And Believers | |
| 2019 | Alessandro Bertoni | Monarkeys (EP 2019) | |
| 2019 | Quantum Pig | Songs Of Industry And Sunshine | |
| 2020 | Frost* | Others | |
| 2020 | Steven Wilson | Eminent Sleaze | |
| 2020 | Mariana Semkina | Sleepwalking | |
| 2020 | Fish | Weltschmerz | |
| 2020 | Lonely Robot | Feelings Are Good | |
| 2020 | Steve Hackett | Selling England By The Pound & Spectral Mornings: Live At Hammersmith | |
| 2020 | The Backstage | Isolation | |
| 2020 | Matt Berry | Phantom Birds | |
| 2020 | Fish | A Fish In The Lemon Tree - Live MMXX | |
| 2020 | Frost* | 13 Winters | |
| 2021 | Mick Paul | Parallel Lives | |
| 2021 | Matt Berry | The Blue Elephant | |
| 2021 | Trifecta | Fragments | |
| 2021 | Illuminae | Dark Horizons | |
| 2021 | Steve Hackett | Surrender Of Silence | |
| 2022 | Matt Berry Featuring Emma Noble | Beatmaker | |
| 2022 | Lonely Robot | A Model Life | |
| 2022 | Steve Hackett | Genesis Revisited Live: Seconds Out & More | |
| 2023 | Frost* | Island Live | |
| 2023 | Steve Hackett | Foxtrot At Fifty + Hackett Highlights: Live In Brighton | |
| 2023 | Steven Wilson | The Harmony Codex | |
| 2023 | Matt Berry | Simplicity | |
| 2024 | Steve Hackett | The Circus and the Nightwhale | |
| 2024 | Frost* | Life in the Wires | |
| 2025 | Matt Berry | Heard Noises | |
| 2025 | Steven Wilson | The Overview | |
| 2025 | Karmakanic | Transmutation | |
