= John Connolly (author) =

Irish author, primarily of detective fiction

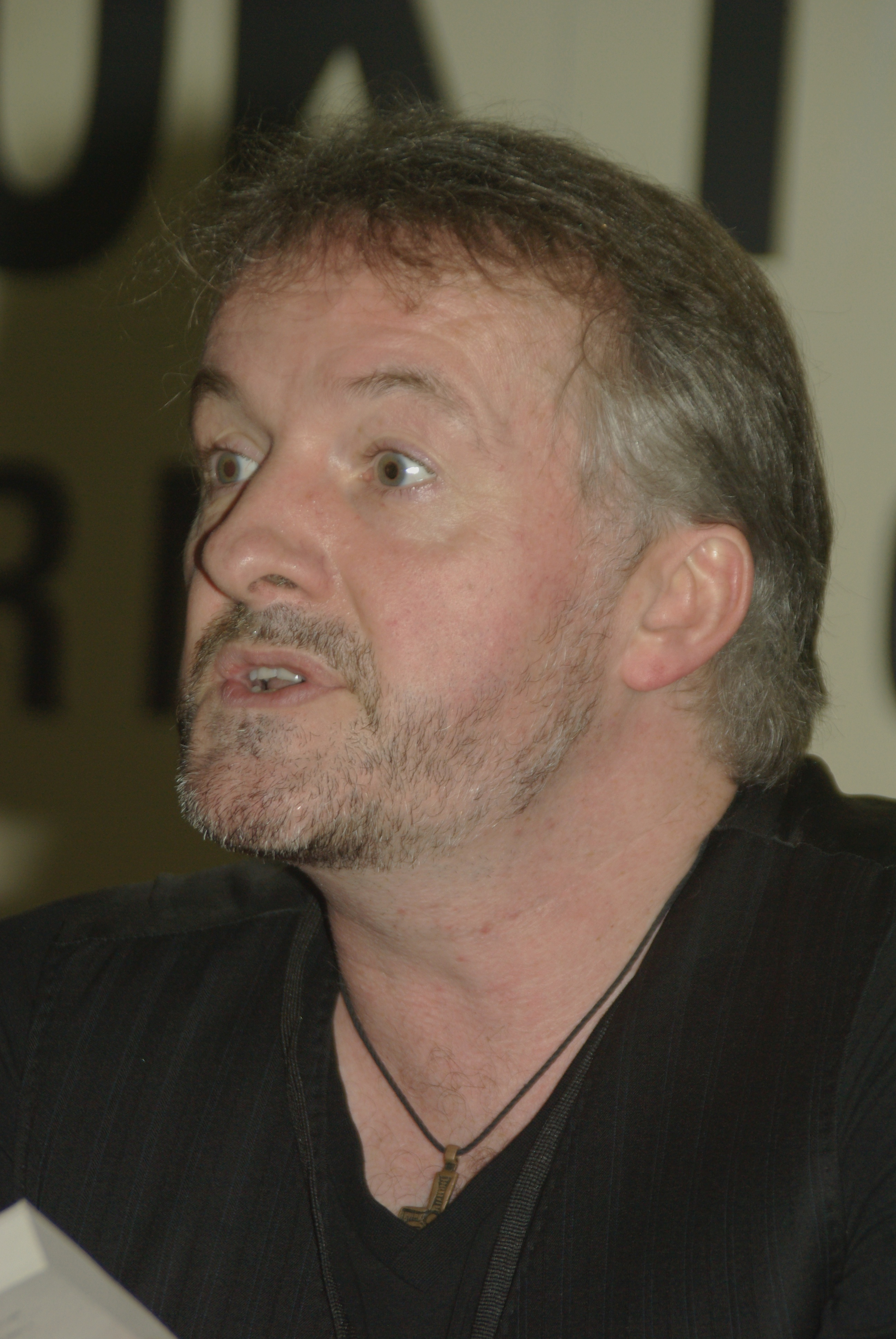
- Connolly in 2011
- Born: 31 May 1968 (age 58) Dublin, Ireland
- Occupation: Novelist, short story writer
- Genre: Crime fiction, horror fiction, fantasy, science fiction, drama
- Notable awards: Agatha (2012); Anthony (2013); Barry (2003); Edgar (2014); Shamus (2000)

Website
- johnconnollybooks.com

John Connolly (born 31 May 1968) is an Irish writer who is best known for his series of novels starring private detective Charlie Parker.

== Biography ==
=== Education and early career ===
Connolly was educated at Synge Street CBS and graduated with a BA in English from Trinity College, Dublin, and a Masters in journalism from Dublin City University. Before becoming a full-time novelist, he worked as a journalist, a barman, a local government official, a waiter and a gofer at Harrods department store in London.

=== Writing career ===
After five years as a freelance journalist for The Irish Times newspaper, he became frustrated with the profession, and began to write his first novel, Every Dead Thing, in his spare time (he continues to contribute articles to the paper, most frequently interviews with other established authors).

Every Dead Thing introduced readers to the anti-hero Charlie Parker, a former police officer hunting the killer of his wife and daughter. It was nominated for the Bram Stoker Award for Best First Novel and went on to win the 2000 Shamus Award for Best First Private Eye Novel, making Connolly the first author outside of the US to win.

Connolly has since written further books in the Parker series, 23 as of 2024, and a non-Parker thriller. He has also ventured outside of the crime genre with the publication of an anthology of ghost stories and The Book of Lost Things, a novel about a young boy's coming-of-age journey through a fantasy realm during World War II England. Film and television adaptations of his works are currently in development; the earliest to appear to audiences was partially based on the short story "The New Daughter", and starred Kevin Costner and Ivana Baquero.

Connolly also tours to promote the launch of his books. In 2007, he made book store appearances in Ireland, United Kingdom, United States, Australia, New Zealand, Hong Kong and Taiwan to promote The Unquiet.

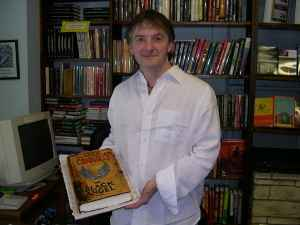
John Connolly signing a copy of The Black Angel, 2005

The seventh book in the Charlie Parker series, The Reapers, was published in 2008. It differs from the earlier books in that the story is told from the point of view of Parker's close friends and allies in combat, Louis and Angel. Louis and Angel are an unlikely couple whose quibbles and good humour are sometimes the source of comic relief. Louis is an enigmatic, large black man who was a hired killer but who now seems to be in semiretirement; Angel is a small part-Latino man and ex-burglar. They appear episodically throughout the Charlie Parker books as his only close friends, revealing themselves when Parker is in need of help and professional protection from his enemies.

The ninth Parker novel, titled The Whisperers, was published in 2010; the tenth, The Burning Soul, in 2011. The Wrath of Angels, the eleventh Charlie Parker novel, was published by Hodder & Stoughton in the UK in August 2012, and was released by Atria/Emily Bestler Books in the US on 1 January 2013. The Wolf in Winter, published in 2014, represented a shift from Charlie Parker's customary first-person narration to a third-person point of view, a shift that continues in A Song of Shadows (2015) and A Time of Torment (2016). A Book of Bones (2019) marks the end of the sequence that began with the novella "The Fractured Atlas," included in Night Music: Nocturnes Vol. 2 (2015), and is a true sequel to The Woman in the Woods.

2009 marked the publication of Connolly's first novel specifically for younger readers, The Gates. A sequel was published in 2011 as Hell's Bells in the UK and as The Infernals in the US. The third book in the Samuel Johnson series, The Creeps, was published in 2013. Connolly also collaborated with his partner, journalist Jennifer Ridyard, on The Chronicles of the Invaders, a fantasy trilogy for teen readers: Conquest (2013), Empire (2015), and Dominion (2016).

Connolly collaborated with fellow Irish author Declan Burke to edit Books to Die For: The World's Greatest Mystery Writers on the World's Greatest Mystery Novels, a nonfiction anthology published in August 2012 by Hodder & Stoughton and in October 2013 by Atria/Emily Bestler Books. Books to Die For was nominated for an Edgar Award by the Mystery Writers of America, won the Agatha Award for Best Non-fiction, and won the Anthony Award for Best Critical Nonfiction Work.

In 2017, Connolly turned a decades-long fascination with the comedian Stan Laurel into the novel he, a fictional exploration of the comedian's last years. Horror Express, a monograph based on the 1972 film, was nominated for a Bram Stoker Award for Superior Achievement in Non-Fiction.

In 2026, he was made an Honorary Fellow of Trinity College Dublin.

==== Themes ====
Connolly was drawn to the tradition of American crime fiction, because it seemed the best medium through which he could explore the issues of compassion, morality, reparation and salvation. He credits veteran authors Ross Macdonald, James Lee Burke, and Ed McBain as influences, and is often praised for writing in a rich and introspective style of prose.

== Published works ==
=== Charlie Parker series ===
1. Every Dead Thing (1999)
2. Dark Hollow (2000)
3. The Killing Kind (2001)
4. The White Road (2002)
5. The Reflecting Eye (2004) (novella contained within Nocturnes)
6. The Black Angel (2005)
7. The Unquiet (2007)
8. The Reapers (2008)
9. The Lovers (2009)
10. The Whisperers (2010)
11. The Burning Soul (2011)
12. The Wrath of Angels (2012)
13. The Wolf in Winter (2014)
14. A Song of Shadows (2015)
15. A Time of Torment (2016)
16. Parker : A Miscellany (2016)
17. A Game of Ghosts (2017)
18. The Woman in the Woods (2018)
19. A Book of Bones (2019)
20. The Dirty South (2020)
21. The Nameless Ones (2021)
22. The Furies (2022) - two novels
23. The Instruments of Darkness (2024)
24. The Children of Eve (2025)
25. A River Red with Blood (2026)

=== Samuel Johnson series ===
1. The Gates (2009)
2. The Infernals (2011), published as Hell's Bells in the UK
3. The Creeps (2013)

=== The Chronicles of the Invaders trilogy ===
1. Conquest (2013)
2. Empire (2015)
3. Dominion (2016)

=== Other novels ===
- Bad Men (2003)
- The Book of Lost Things (2006)
- He: A Novel (2017)
- The Land of Lost Things (2023)

=== Short story collections ===
- Nocturnes (2004) – a collection of supernatural tales book-ended by two novellas, 9 of which are transcripts of stories written for presentation on BBC Radio Four Five Ghost Stories By John Connolly: The Erlking, Mr Pettinger's Demon, Mr Gray's Folly, The Ritual of the Bones, Nocturne.
- Night Music: Nocturnes 2 (2015)
- Night & Day (2024)

=== Short stories ===
- "The Inkpot Monkey" (2004) – in Like A Charm: A Novel In Voices – an anthology of short stories from 15 mystery writers, (also featured in Nocturnes). Edited by Karin Slaughter.
- "Mr. Gray's Folly" (2005) – in Dangerous Women – an anthology of short stories from 17 crime writers. Edited by Otto Penzler.
- "The Cycle" (2005) – under the pseudonym Laura Froom (after the titular vampire in a story from Nocturnes) in Moments: Short Stories by Irish Women Writers in Aid of the Victims of the Tsunami. Edited by Ciara Considine.
- "A Haunting" (2008) – in Downturn Tales: Stay-Up-All-Night Stories from Your Favorite Bestselling Authors.
- "Lazarus" (2010) – in The New Dead – an anthology of zombie stories edited by Christopher Golden.
- "The Caxton Lending Library & Book Depository" (2013) – a Bibliomystery published as e-text, paperback and limited edition hardcover by The Mysterious Bookshop, New York.
- "The Wanderer in Unknown Realms" (2013) – a novella published electronically by Hodder & Stoughton and Atria/Emily Bestler Books and in limited hardcover edition by the author.

=== Nonfiction ===
- Connolly, John; Burke, Declan, eds. (2012). Books to Die For. Hodder & Stoughton.
- Connolly, John (2018). Horror Express. PS Publishing.

== Film adaptations ==
- The New Daughter (2009) – partially based on a short story of the same name from Nocturnes, starring Kevin Costner and Ivana Baquero, directed by Luiso Berdejo, with a screenplay by John Travis
- (Prospective) The Gates, The Infernals, and The Creeps — acquired for development by DreamWorks Studios as a possible franchise, November 2015

== Awards ==
- Nominee: 1999 Bram Stoker Award (First Novel), for Every Dead Thing
- Nominee: 2000 Barry Award (Best British Crime Novel), for Every Dead Thing
- Winner: 2000 Shamus Award (Best First P.I. Novel), for Every Dead Thing
- Nominee: 2001 Barry Award (Best British Crime Novel), for Dark Hollow
- Nominee: 2002 Barry Award (Best British Crime Novel), for The Killing Kind
- Winner: 2003 Barry Award (Best British Crime Novel), for The White Road
- Nominee: 2005 CWA Short Story Dagger Award, for "Miss Froom, Vampire"
- Nominee: 2007 Hughes & Hughes Irish Novel of the Year, for The Book of Lost Things
- Winner: 2012 Agatha Award (Best Nonfiction), with Declan Burke, for Books to Die For
- Nominee: 2013 Edgar Award (Best Critical/Biographical), with Declan Burke, for Books to Die For
- Nominee: 2013 H.R.F. Keating Award, with Declan Burke, for Books to Die For
- Winner: 2013 Anthony Award (Best Critical Nonfiction Work), with Declan Burke, for Books to Die For
- Winner: 2014 Edgar Award (Best Short Story), for The Caxton Private Lending Library & Book Depository, Bibliomysteries
- Winner: 2014 Anthony Award (Best Short Story), for The Caxton Private Lending Library & Book Depository, Bibliomysteries
- Nominee: 2016 Barry Award (Best Novel), for A Song of Shadows
- Nominee: 2018 Bram Stoker Award (Superior Achievement in Non-Fiction), for Horror Express
