= Kill the Wolf =

Kill the Wolf may refer to:

- Kill the Wolf (Matt Berry album)
- Kill the Wolf (B. Dolan album)
