= Heard Noises =

Studio album by Matt Berry
- Released: 24 January 2025
- Genre: Psychedelic pop; neo-psychedelia; psychedelic rock
- Length: 49:01
- Label: Acid Jazz
- Producer: Matt Berry

Matt Berry chronology
Simplicity (2023)	Heard Noises (2025)

Singles from Heard Noises
- 1. "I Gotta Limit" Released: September 17, 2024; 2. "Wedding Photo Stranger" Released: January 7, 2025

Heard Noises is the eleventh studio album by English musician Matt Berry. It was released on 24 January 2025, through the label Acid Jazz Records.

== Background ==
Several individuals, including Berry's longtime drummer Craig Blundell, Natasha Lyonne, Eric D. Johnson, Phil Scragg, and Kitty Durham of Kitty, Daisy & Lewis, collaborated with Berry in the production of the album. Heard Noises was Berry's first release since his 2023 instrumental album, Simplicity, and his first studio album featuring vocals since the release of The Blue Elephant in 2021.

== Reception ==
Professional ratings
Aggregate scores
Source	Rating
Metacritic	84/100
Review scores
Source	Rating
AllMusic	4.5/5 stars
Louder Than War	4.5/5 stars
Record Collector	4/5 stars

On review aggregator Metacritic, the album received an average score of 84 out of 100 from 5 reviews, indicating "universal acclaim".

Tim Sendra of AllMusic stated in his review of the album "Heard Noises ranks right near the top [of Berry's discography], and if the sun hits it just right and one squints a little, it might be sitting merrily atop the very summit."

Louder Than War gave it a rating of 4.5 out of 5, describing it as a "nice piece of magic to end the polymath's latest statement of intent into complex music yet simple to the ears."

Record Collector called Heard Noises "arguably his best album yet" and rated it four out of five.

BrooklynVegan referred to the album as "another groovy psych-pop gem", calling it a "A Matt Berry Primer".

tmrw magazine wrote: "Heard Noises combines some '70s Prog structures with '60s pop sensibilities and production. It’s vibrantly rewritten history, and with songs that flow seamlessly into each other, it makes for a great listen from front to back."

== Track listing ==
All tracks are written by Matt Berry.

No.	Title	Length
1.	"Why on Fire?" (featuring Eric D. Johnson)	4:56
2.	"Silver Rings"	2:23
3.	"Interlude"	0:39
4.	"Be Alarmed"	5:32
5.	"I Gotta Limit" (featuring Kitty Liv)	3:09
6.	"Wedding Photo Stranger"	4:34
7.	"Stay on the Ground"	4:20
8.	"I Entered as I Came" (featuring Natasha Lyonne)	4:19
9.	"There Are Monsters"	3:41
10.	"To Live for What Once Was" (featuring Eric D. Johnson and Phil Scragg)	3:13
11.	"Canada Dry"	2:04
12.	"The Snakes Will Slide" (featuring Eric D. Johnson and Phil Scragg)	4:07
13.	"Interlude 2"	0:43
14.	"Sky High" (featuring Rosie McDermott)	5:21
Total length:		49:06

== Personnel ==
Credits adapted from Tidal.

- Matt Berry – vocals, acoustic guitar, ARP synthesizer, bass guitar, electric guitar, Farfisa organ, glockenspiel, Hammond B3, Mellotron, Minimoog, organ, Vox Continental, Wurlitzer piano, xylophone, Yamaha keyboards, production, mixing, engineering, cover art, paintings, photography
- Craig Blundell – drums, percussion
- Mike Thorne – mastering
- Jaffa – graphic design

== Charts ==
Chart performance for Heard Noises
Chart (2025)	Peak position
Scottish Albums (OCC)	10
UK Albums (OCC)	22
UK Independent Albums (OCC)	3
