= Day and Age (Frost album) =

Studio album by Frost*
- Released: 14 May 2021
- Genre: Neo-prog
- Length: 53:16
- Label: InsideOut

Frost* chronology
Falling Satellites (2016)	Day and Age (2021)	Life In The Wires (2024)

Professional ratings
Review scores
Source	Rating
All About the Rock	8.5/10
Prog Radio	4.5/5 stars
SonicPerspectives	8.9/10

Day and Age is the fourth studio album by the British neo-prog group Frost*. It marks the first album without a permanent drummer as a core part of the band. Three different guest drummers contributed drums to complete the album: Pat Mastelotto, Kaz Rodriguez, and Darby Todd. The actor Jason Isaacs also contributed narration on The Boy Who Stood Still.

== Track listing ==
Disc 1 (Standard edition)

1. "Day and Age" – 11:49
2. "Terrestrial" – 5:12
3. "Waiting for the Lie" – 4:31
4. "The Boy Who Stood Still" – 7:33
5. "Island Life" – 4:14
6. "Skywards" – 4:15
7. "Kill the Orchestra" – 9:27
8. "Repeat to Fade" – 6:15

Disc 2 (Deluxe edition)

1. "Day and Age (Instrumental)" – 11:36
2. "Terrestrial (Instrumental)" – 5:13
3. "Waiting for the Lie (Instrumental)" – 4:33
4. "The Boy Who Stood Still (Instrumental)" – 7:36
5. "Island Life (Instrumental)" – 4:05
6. "Skywards (Instrumental)" – 4:15
7. "Kill the Orchestra (Instrumental)" – 9:27
8. "Repeat to Fade (Instrumental)" – 6:09

== Personnel ==
Musicians

- Jem Godfrey – keyboards, Chapman Railboard, vocals
- John Mitchell – electric guitar, vocals
- Nathan King – bass guitar
- Pat Mastelotto – drums (Skywards, Repeat to Fade)
- Kaz Rodriguez – drums (Day and Age, The Boy Who Stood Still, Island Life)
- Darby Todd – drums (Terrestrial, Waiting for the Lie, Kill the Orchestra)

Production

- Production and mixing – Jem Godfrey
- Mastering – Peter van 't Riet at FineTune
- Photography and graphic design – Carl Glover at Aleph Studio
- Band photography – Damien Plinth
- Licensing – Inside Out Music
- Distribution – Sony Music Entertainment
