= Snuff Box (TV series) =

British dark sitcom

- Screen shot from the opening title sequence
- Genre: Dark comedy; Sitcom
- Created by: Matt Berry; Rich Fulcher
- Written by: Matt Berry; Rich Fulcher
- Directed by: Michael Cumming
- Starring: Matt Berry; Rich Fulcher; Alan Ford
- Theme music composer: Matt Berry
- Country of origin: United Kingdom
- No. of series: 1
- No. of episodes: 6

Production
- Producer: Charlie Hanson
- Running time: 30 minutes
- Production company: Channel X Productions

Original release
- Network: BBC Three
- Release: 27 February – 3 April 2006

Snuff Box (sometimes referred to as Berry & Fulcher's Snuff Box) is a British dark sitcom set in London. Starring and written by Matt Berry and Rich Fulcher with additional material by Nick Gargano, it aired on BBC Three in 2006. The series was directed by Brass Eye director Michael Cumming who later directed Berry's Toast of London.

Starring as fictionalized versions of themselves, Berry plays a hangman ("High Executioner to the King of England"), and Fulcher his assistant. The majority of the programme is set in a "gentlemen's club for hangmen", although the show is also interspersed with sequences of sketches, often featuring different characters. The show is set in "no particular time" with deliberately anachronistic sets.

== Background ==
Berry and Fulcher met whilst working together on another BBC Three comedy, The Mighty Boosh. Snuff Box was originally titled Berry & Fulcher's Comedy Bronze.

The show was produced by Channel X Productions, who had previously produced the animated series Popetown for BBC Three in 2005. Popetown had been met with international controversy prior to its broadcast, so was never aired by BBC Three. According to Berry, this led to the commissioning of Snuff Box, as BBC Three owed Channel X Productions a favour. In addition, BBC Three was looking for a new sketch show to replace Little Britain, which had been moved to BBC One for its final series.

== Reception ==
The Guardian described the show as "fantastically dark and cynical".

== DVD release ==
The DVD was released on 16 June 2008.

On 11 October 2011, Severin Films released the series on DVD with a bonus CD of music and other exclusive extra features in the North American market.

== Episodes ==
This list is ordered by the original air dates on BBC Three in the United Kingdom.

No.	Title	Original release date
1	"Rich's Mother"	27 February 2006
The identity of Rich's mother is a closely guarded secret, but Matt is determined to find out the truth for his own financial gain.
2	"Matt's Diary"	6 March 2006
Rich sets out to humiliate Matt by reading extracts from his diary aloud, in front of the other club members – but retribution is not far away.
3	"Punchline"	13 March 2006
Matt is furious that Rich keeps ruining the punchlines of his jokes – especially as he keeps his friend supplied with whisky and women.
4	"Oh Brothers"	20 March 2006
Matt and Rich must decide where their loyalties lie when their two brothers pay an unwelcome visit to London and stir up trouble.
5	"Love Triangle"	27 March 2006
Tension brews in the strange world of the horrible hangmen, as a beautiful woman causes all kinds of jealous feelings to rise to the fore – and Matt reverts to his devilish ways.
6	"The Wedding"	3 April 2006
Rich plans to tie the knot, finally escaping Matt's clutches and leading a life of his own. However, his fellow hangman is determined to keep him in the gentleman's club, whatever it takes.

== Music ==
The Snuff Box theme is used repeatedly throughout the series. Matt Berry composed the music, both themes and incidental. He sang most of the vocal parts and played most of the instruments. He recorded the theme tune in his flat. English composer Tony Hatch advised Berry on the brass sections.

The film Dredd featured the Snuff Box theme in a few scenes.
