= The New Daughter =

- DVD cover
- Directed by: Luis Berdejo
- Screenplay by: John Travis
- Based on: The New Daughter by John Connolly
- Produced by: Paul Brooks
- Starring: Kevin Costner; Ivana Baquero; Samantha Mathis
- Cinematography: Checco Varese
- Edited by: Tom Elkins; Robb Sullivan
- Music by: Javier Navarrete
- Production companies: Gold Circle Films; New Daughter Productions
- Distributed by: Anchor Bay Entertainment
- Release date: December 18, 2009
- Running time: 108 minutes
- Country: United States
- Language: English

The New Daughter is a 2009 American horror film and the feature directorial debut of Spanish screenwriter Luis Berdejo. It stars Kevin Costner, Ivana Baquero and Samantha Mathis. Based on the short story of the same name by John Connolly, it tells the story of a novelist and his two children who encounter a malevolent presence when they move to a house in the country adjacent to a burial mound.

== Plot ==
Recently divorced novelist John James moves into an old house in rural South Carolina with his teenage daughter, Louisa, and young son, Sam. The house is locally infamous for the disappearance of Sarah Wayne, a woman who lived there. On their first night in the house, Louisa hears strange noises. Unseen by her is a humanoid creature lurking outside on the roof. The following day, while exploring the surrounding fields and forest, the children find a large mound. John later finds Louisa's pet cat mutilated near the house.

Louisa returns to the mound after school and hears noises. It sounds like approaching animal growls. That night, John finds muddy footprints leading from the front door to the bathroom. Louisa is inside with the door locked, sitting in the tub as the shower washes her muddied body. She is also bleeding. Later that night, Louisa sleepwalks. John takes her back to bed and finds a doll made from straw, inside which is a ball containing a spider. The next morning, Louisa has breakfast wearing a short black dress and make-up. She claims not to have seen the doll.

At school, Louisa is bullied by a preppy girl. Meanwhile, John finds muddy clothes in her bedroom. Outside the house, he finds the head of Louisa's doll at the mound, and the bloody remains of a blackbird. John is called to come to pick up Louisa, who says she does not feel well. In the infirmary he passes the preppy girl, who apparently "fell" down some stairs and injured her arm. Sam's teacher, Cassandra, gives John her number, offering her friendship. He later finds a nest of spiders in the kitchen drawer where he placed the doll. That night, Louisa emerges from the woods, even though John previously ordered her to be home by dark. He calls attention to scarring on her neck, but Louisa storms off without explanation. At dinner, she eats in an animal-like manner, as if starved.

While John is on a date with Cassandra, Louisa hears noises outside the house and exits. Returning home, John sees a figure, which vaguely looks like Louisa, running through the woods in front of the house. He exits his car and follows sounds of growls, but growing fearful, he rushes back to his car. A stone hits his window. At home, he asks if Louisa was outside, she says no. He orders her not to go near the mound any more.

The next day, Sam is directed by Louisa to climb the ladder to the attic. Sam falls when frightened by animal noises. He requires stitches, and John berates Louisa for what happened. That night, John searches the internet, finding an article about burial mounds. He telephones an expert on the subject, Professor White, but is ignored. He then researches Sarah; she disappeared after having locked her teenage daughter Emily in her bedroom. Emily was found alive and went to live with her grandfather, Roger.

John leaves the children with babysitter Mrs. Amworth and goes to find Roger. Louisa returns to the mound. John lets himself inside Roger Wayne's empty house and looks around. In Emily's room he finds a nest made from twigs and straw, and a depiction of the burial mound drawn onto a wall with the word "home" below it. Roger arrives and reveals that he burned down his house with Emily inside, insisting that it was not her anymore.

While John is away, Mrs. Amworth is locked out of the house, and growls are heard approaching. Sam hides in his room as he hears her cries for help. John arrives home, comforts Sam, and asks Louisa what happened to the babysitter. Louisa says she does not know. After reporting the babysitter's disappearance to police, John takes an ill Louisa to bed. That night, John dreams of a doorway on top of the mound and Louisa transforming into a creature. The next day he finds a nest in Louisa's closet. John calls a contractor to destroy the mound. Professor White, having called back to ask about the mound, arrives and pleads with John to wait. He mentions an ancient civilization who worshiped the burial mounds, believing them to be the homes of Gods, or "mound-walkers". He talks of a ritual exchange of gifts — including straw dolls — and the mound-walkers' search for a girl with whom to mate and bear a new generation of deities to reclaim the earth. Horrified, John instructs the bulldozer to start. When it digs into the mound, the body of Mrs. Amworth is uncovered. John is taken to the police station for questioning while Cassandra looks after the kids.

That night, as officer Ed Lowry drives John home, they are attacked and Lowry is dragged from the patrol car by a creature. John continues home, discovering it in disarray and finding Cassandra with her throat slit. She dies while motioning toward Louisa standing in the doorway. John gathers the children to leave, but Louisa refuses. Mound-walkers begin attacking the house, and John kills three. After the attack, Louisa is missing. Her screams can be heard coming from the mound. John leaves Sam in his room, telling him to wait for the police. In the mound, John finds a tunnel. He pierces a can of gasoline, sets explosives left from the postponed demolition by the tunnel entrance, sparks a flare for light and crawls inside. Louisa is found unconscious and covered in mud. As he carries her out, creatures howl and give chase. Meanwhile, Sam exits the house.

John escapes the mound with Louisa and blocks the tunnel with the leaking fuel canister, but another mound-walker is already there outside. Louisa collapses and begs John not to leave her. He looks down at her and sees her beginning to transform into one of the creatures. John drops a flare into the diesel fuel and the mound explodes. A figure then emerges. Shadows also move in the trees and house. A growling creature emerges directly behind Sam.

== Cast ==
- Kevin Costner as John James
- Ivana Baquero as Louisa James
- Gattlin Griffith as Sam James
- Samantha Mathis as Cassandra Parker
- Noah Taylor as Professor Evan White
- Margaret Anne Florence as Alexis Danella
- James Gammon as Roger Wayne
- Erik Palladino as Officer Lowry
- Guy Perry as Alpha Creature
- Sandra Ellis Lafferty as Mrs. Amworth

== Production ==
In January 2007, it was announced Gold Circle Films had acquired a spec script titled The New Daughter by John Travis adapted from the short story of the same name by Irish author John Connolly.

In October 2007, it was announced Kevin Costner would star in the lead role.

=== Filming ===
Filming took place primarily at the Wedge Plantation along the Santee River just north of McClellanville, South Carolina. Secondary filming was done in McClellanville and on the College of Charleston campus. The exterior of the house in which John James finds Roger Wayne was shot at 67 Moultrie St., Charleston, South Carolina. The school used in filming is West Ashley Middle School, about 3 miles from the original 1670 Charleston Town settlement (The school was formerly Middleton High School, the alma mater of Darius Rucker, and before that it was St. Andrews Jr. High School). School remained in session during filming, with teachers peeking out the windows at Kevin Costner, and film crews and vehicles crowded in between cars in the teachers' parking lot. The side entrance of the building was used as the "front" of the school in the movie. Air conditioning units were hidden by temporary evergreen trees which were removed after filming.

== Release ==
Initially distribution rights for The New Daughter were acquired by New Line Cinema but was given a limited theatrical released on December 19, 2009 by Anchor Bay. It was released on DVD and Blu-ray Disc on May 18, 2010.

== Reception ==
On Rotten Tomatoes the film has an approval rating of 40% based on reviews from 10 critics.

Andrew Barker of Variety wrote: "Nowhere near as bad as its invisible marketing strategy might suggest. But that's not to imply that it's worth seeking out."

== See also ==
- List of ghost films
