= Phantom Birds =

Studio album by Matt Berry
- Released: 18 September 2020
- Recorded: 2019–2020
- Genre: Psychedelic pop; psychedelic folk; country rock
- Length: 33:44
- Label: Acid Jazz
- Producer: Matt Berry

Matt Berry chronology
Television Themes (2018)	Phantom Birds (2020)	The Blue Elephant (2021)

Professional ratings
Review scores
Source	Rating
AllMusic	4/5 stars
The Times	4/5 stars

Phantom Birds is the eighth studio album by English comedian and musician Matt Berry, released in September 2020 by Acid Jazz Records.

== Track listing ==
Phantom Birds track listing
No.	Title	Length
1.	"Something in My Eye"	3:03
2.	"You Danced All Night"	2:35
3.	"Phantom Birds"	2:39
4.	"Moonlight Flit"	2:43
5.	"Man of Doom"	3:18
6.	"Where's My Love?"	1:21
7.	"Take a Bow"	3:01
8.	"Intermission"	0:42
9.	"Hail to the King"	3:00
10.	"In My Mind"	3:06
11.	"That Yellow Bird"	2:44
12.	"Waving Goodbye"	2:45
13.	"Covered in Clowns"	2:47
Total length:		33:44

== Personnel ==
- Matt Berry - vocals, acoustic guitar, 12-string guitar, electric guitar, bass guitar, piano, organ, Mellotron, harmonica, songwriting, production, engineering
- BJ Cole - pedal steel guitar
- Craig Blundell - drums

== Charts ==
Chart performance for Phantom Birds
Chart (2020)	Peak position
Scottish Albums (OCC)	7
UK Albums (OCC)	31
