= Rich Fulcher =

American comedian and writer (born 1968)

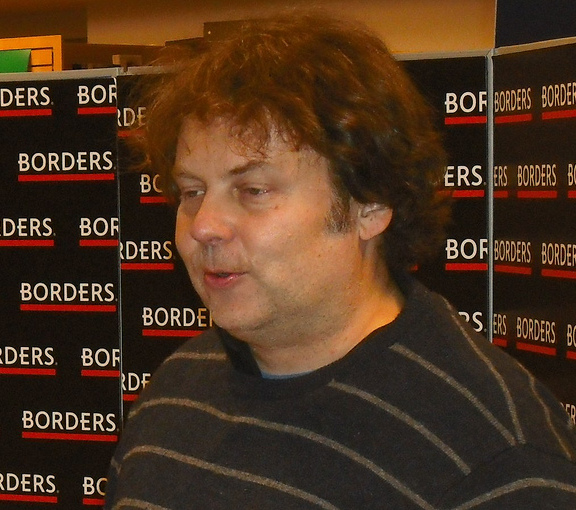
- Fulcher at a book signing in 2009
- Born: Richard Fulcher; November 18, 1968 (age 57); Massachusetts, U.S.
- Education: Dartmouth College
- Occupations: Comedian; actor; author; lawyer
- Years active: 1994–present
- Known for: The Mighty Boosh; Snuff Box
- Children: 1

Richard Fulcher (/rɪtʃ/ /ˈfʊltʃər/; born November 18, 1968) is an American comedian, actor and writer. Known for his improvised style of comedy, he gained prominence as a member of The Mighty Boosh comedy troupe in the United Kingdom.

Fulcher graduated with a degree in law at Dartmouth College, but decided to pursue a career in comedy, becoming a member of the Upright Citizens Brigade. He initially launched an improvised comedy show in Chicago, which he later performed at the Edinburgh Fringe Festival. In 1998, he joined The Mighty Boosh, appearing in the stage shows and radio series. He played various characters, most notably Bob Fossil, in The Mighty Boosh television series, which aired on BBC Three from 2004 to 2007. He also co-wrote and starred in the sketch comedy series Snuff Box alongside Matt Berry.

His other credits include voice roles in the animated series Disenchantment, Rick and Morty and Futurama, as well as live-action performances in Drunk History, Sexy Murder Marriage Story (2019), and Wonka (2023).

== Early life and education ==
Richard Fulcher was born in Massachusetts on November 18, 1968. He graduated with a degree in government at Dartmouth College, and spent a further three years at law school before taking the bar in Pennsylvania.

Fulcher subsequently decided to pursue a career in comedy, working with the ImprovOlympic and Second City in Chicago, where he became an early member of the Upright Citizens Brigade. During this time, he co-created—alongside Dick Costolo and Phil Granchi—the acclaimed improvised show Modern Problems in Science at the Annoyance Theater. The show toured the United Kingdom in 1994, with performances at the Edinburgh Fringe Festival and Bloomsbury Theatre in London.

== Career ==
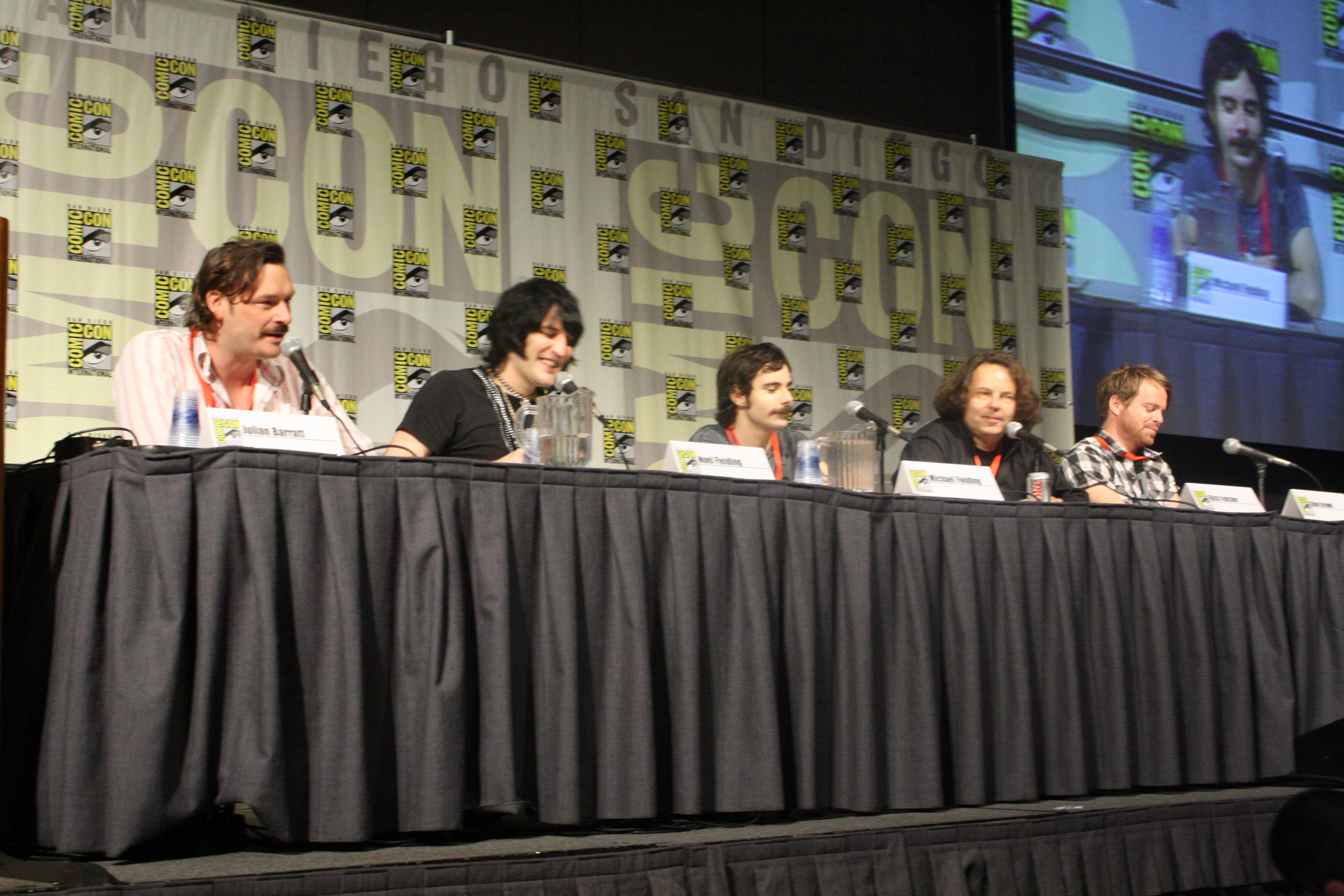
The cast of The Mighty Boosh at Comic-con; from left to right Julian Barratt, Noel Fielding, Michael Fielding, Rich Fulcher, Dave Brown (2009)

=== The Mighty Boosh ===
In 1998, he met his future Mighty Boosh co-stars Julian Barratt and Noel Fielding while filming the sketch show Unnatural Acts for the Paramount Comedy Channel.

Fulcher joined Barratt and Fielding, forming The Mighty Boosh comedy troupe, and performed a trio of stage shows: The Mighty Boosh (1998), Arctic Boosh (1999), Autoboosh (2000). The group. Fulcher played Bob Fossil, a deranged and inept zoo manager. He reprised his role as Fossil in The Mighty Boosh television show, which aired on BBC Three from 2004 to 2007, as well as other minor characters including Lester Corncrake.

Fulcher co-wrote and starred in the BBC Three sketch show Snuff Box, alongside Matt Berry, whom he met on the set of The Mighty Boosh. Berry played the High Executioner to the King of England and Fulcher his assistant. Snuff Box aired on BBC Three in 2006.

=== Television ===
In January 2008, he starred in ITV's made-for-mobile TV show The Gym as Dave Darblay, a life coach unable to recover from the loneliness of being left by his wife. It was announced on November 11, 2008, that MTV had commissioned a spin-off series of The Mighty Boosh, starring Rich Fulcher as Eleanor, the transvestite who appeared in an episode of The Mighty Boosh titled "Eels".

In 2009, Fulcher (in the character of Bob Fossil) wrote Tiny Acts of Rebellion, which was published by Michael O'Mara Books and illustrated by Mr Bingo. He made several publicity appearances in the promotion of the book at book signings in Europe and the United States. The book was also adapted into a stage show which sold out at the Edinburgh Fringe.

On July 16, 2013, he appeared on Drunk History retelling the story of Abraham Lincoln during his time as a lawyer. He has since returned to the series, portraying Porter Wagoner, Julius Waties Waring, William A. Clark, and Franklin Delano Roosevelt.

On January 20, 2015, it was reported that Channel 4 had commissioned Fulcher to create a non-transmission pilot called That's Rich, a sitcom about a family-run adult shop.

On March 1, 2015, he guest-starred in an episode of Bob's Burgers titled "The Gayle Tales", playing a character named Stacy. Later in 2015, Fulcher appeared in the BBC Three comedy Top Coppers as Mayor Grady. He also starred alongside Nick Mohammed and Lolly Adefope in Sexy Murder, a BBC Three parody of Making a Murderer, on October 31, 2016.

Fulcher appeared in the 2018 episode "I'm Sick" on the Netflix series Love, playing the character of Glen Michener, an actor who played the role of Michael Myers in Halloween. Later in 2018, he appeared in the Showtime series Kidding, as Clay, one of the puppeteers alongside Jim Carrey. He also appeared in Still Up, an Apple TV+ programme released in September 2023.

=== Film ===
Fulcher played Judge Neil Tilden in Marriage Story by Noah Baumbach. In Wonka, he played Larry Chucklesworth, a comedian who encourages Wonka to make chocolate. The film was directed by Paul King (who directed The Mighty Boosh).

== Filmography ==
=== Film ===
Year	Title	Role	Notes
2006	The Mighty Boosh Live	Bob Fossil	Video
2009	Bunny and the Bull	Captain Crab	Voice
2011	High Road	Arnie	
2011	Arthur Christmas	Elf	Voice
2019	Marriage Story	Judge Neil Tilden	
2023	Abruptio	Dummkopf	
2023	Wonka	Larry Chucklesworth	

=== Television ===
Year	Title	Role	Notes
1998	Unnatural Acts	Various Roles	Also co-writer
2004	Crossballs: The Debate Show	Occasional Fake Guest Debater	2 episodes
2004	AD/BC: A Rock Opera	Townsfolk	TV movie
2004–2007	The Mighty Boosh	Bob Fossil/Various	All episodes
2006	Snuff Box	Rich Fulcher/Various	Also co-writer
2007	How Not to Live Your Life	Unknown	Episode: "Pilot"
2008	Trexx and Flipside	Mr. Brilliance	6 episodes
2008–2010	The Sarah Silverman Program	Reverend Fulcher	2 episodes
2009	Skins	Judge Jordan	Episode: "Freddie"
2010	Little Crackers	The Controller	Episode: "Bill Bailey's Little Cracker: Car Park Babylon"
2011	Childrens Hospital	Greg	Episode: "Run, Dr. Lola Spratt, Run"
2011	The Problem Solverz	Lidget the Zoo Keeper (voice)	Episode: "Zoo Cops"
2011	Jon Benjamin Has a Van	Edward Sheath	3 episodes
2011	NTSF:SD:SUV	Elena	Episode: "Exes and Oh-No's!"
2011	Adventure Time	Jaybird (voice) / Additional Voices	Episode: "Apple Thief"
2011	SpongeBob SquarePants	Master Fuzzy Acorns (voice)	Episode: "The Way of the Sponge"
2011	Mongrels	Producer	Episode: "Marion and the Myocardial Infarction"
2012–2014	Regular Show	Answering Machine / Smoke Signal (voice)	2 episodes
2012–2014	Noel Fielding's Luxury Comedy	Various Characters	2 episodes
2013	The League	Luther the Hobo	Episode: "The Bringer Show"
2013–2019	Drunk History	Himself / various	12 episodes
2014	Rick and Morty	King Flippy-nips (voice)	Episode: "Something Ricked This Way Comes"
2014	Review	Randy Romer	Episode: "Revenge; Getting Rich; Aching"
2014	The Hotwives of Orlando	Doctor	2 episodes
2014	Garfunkel and Oates	Dr. Patel	2 episodes
2014–2015	Wander Over Yonder	Sourdough / Queen Entozoa / Worm (voice)	3 episodes
2015	Kroll Show	Dr. Todds	Episode: "Bangs"
2015	Comedy Bang! Bang!	Mayor Flowercube	Episode: "Michael Sheen Wears a Plaid Button Down and Grey Blazer"
2015	Top Coppers	Mayor Grady	5 episodes
2015	Uncle Grandpa	Various voices	2 episodes
2015–2016	Bob's Burgers	Professor Wallace / Emcee / Stacy (voice)	2 episodes
2015–2016	Another Period	Mark Twain	3 episodes
2015–2016	The Adventures of OG Sherlock Kush	Watson	2 episodes
2015–2018	The Amazing World of Gumball	Frankie Watterson (voice)	4 episodes
2016	The Amazing Gayl Pile	Rudy	3 episodes
2016–2019	Bajillion Dollar Propertie$	Dr. Chambong	3 episodes
2016–2019	Those Who Can't	Dan Trebin	9 episodes
2017	Curb Your Enthusiasm	Restaurant Manager	Episode: "A Disturbance in the Kitchen"
2017	Do You Want to See a Dead Body?	Derek	Episode: "A Body and an Ex-Con (with Danny Pudi)"
2017–2018	Future-Worm!	Barl (voice)	2 episodes
2018–2023	Disenchantment	Cloyd / Turbish / Satan J. Satan Jr. / Others (voice)	20 episodes
2018	Love	Glenn Michener	Episode: "I'm Sick"
2018	Speechless	Mel	Episode: "L-O-N-- LONDON: Part 2"
2018	Kidding	Clay	3 episodes
2018	Zapped	Nik Nak	Episode: "Book"
2019	Mao Mao: Heroes of Pure Heart	Reggie (voice)	Episode: "Outfoxed"
2020–2022	Tig n' Seek	Boss	Lead role
2020–2024	Star Trek: Lower Decks	Rumdar / Jackabog / Rebner / Pakled Emperor / Others (voice)	4 episodes
2021	Kid Cosmic	Zarkon	
2021	Spitting Image		Writer
2023	Black Mirror	Gainsborough	Episode: "Joan Is Awful"
2023	Still Up	Cat Man	5 episodes
2025	The Wonderfully Weird World of Gumball	Frankie Watterson (voice)	Episode: "The Portrait"
2025	Life, Larry and the Pursuit of Unhappiness	Tilden's Aide	Episode: "Farewell"
2026	Futurama	Turbish (voice)	Episode: "A New New York Yankee in King Elfo's Court"

== Sources ==
- Hunt, Leon (2015). "The 'Zooniverse' and other (furnished) comic worlds". Cult British TV Comedy. Manchester University Press. pp. 147–164. ISBN 978-0719089220.
