= Another Day (David Cross and David Jackson album) =

Studio album by David Cross and David Jackson
- Released: 16 March 2018
- Studio: T.S. Studios, Suffolk; Mill Hill Music Complex
- Genre: Progressive rock; jazz fusion; jazz rock
- Length: 56:17
- Label: Cross & Jackson Music
- Producer: Jake Jackson

Another Day is a 2018 album by musicians David Cross (ex-King Crimson) and David Jackson (ex-Van der Graaf Generator). The two had previously performed together at David Cross Band performances in 2017 (and later in 2019). The personnel of the album also features David Cross Band rhythm section Craig Blundell (drums) and Mick Paul (bass).

== Overview ==
Before the album, David Jackson had previously guested at David Cross Band concerts (on saxophones, flute and keyboards). They performed some David Cross Band material as well as a few King Crimson classics (including Starless) plus George Martin's Theme One, that was covered by Jackson's Van der Graaf Generator in their early days.

Another Day is a completely different to the previously mentioned concerts, being the result of a collaborative effort of David Cross and David Jackson. This album is more of a Jazz-Rock/Fusion album, compared to the Heavy Prog of the David Cross Band. The most similar to Another Day among Cross' solo albums is probably his first, Memos from Purgatory, from 1989. David Jackson's 1992 solo album Tonewall Stands can also be a relevant reference.

== Track listing ==
All music is composed by David Cross and David Jackson (except noted).

Another Day track listing
No.	Title	Writer(s)	Length
1.	"Predator"		4:56
2.	"Bushido"		1:22
3.	"Last Ride"		5:57
4.	"Going Nowhere"		4:50
5.	"Trane to Kiev"	Cross, Jackson, Mick Paul and Craig Blundell	3:18
6.	"Millennium Toll"		5:38
7.	"Arrival"		7:49
8.	"Come Again"		6:52
9.	"Breaking Bad"	Cross, Jackson, Paul and Blundell	4:01
10.	"Mr. Morose"	Cross, Jackson, Paul and Blundell	4:31
11.	"Anthem for Another Day"		5:47
12.	"Time Gentlemen, Please"	Cross, Jackson, Paul and Blundell	1:16
Total length:			56:17

== Personnel ==
- David Cross – electric violin, keyboards
- David Jackson – flute, saxophones, keyboards, sound beams effects
- Mick Paul – bass
- Craig Blundell – drums
- Jake Jackson – production
- Michael Inns – artwork
- John Webber – mastering at Air Studios
