= Guy Perry =

American actor

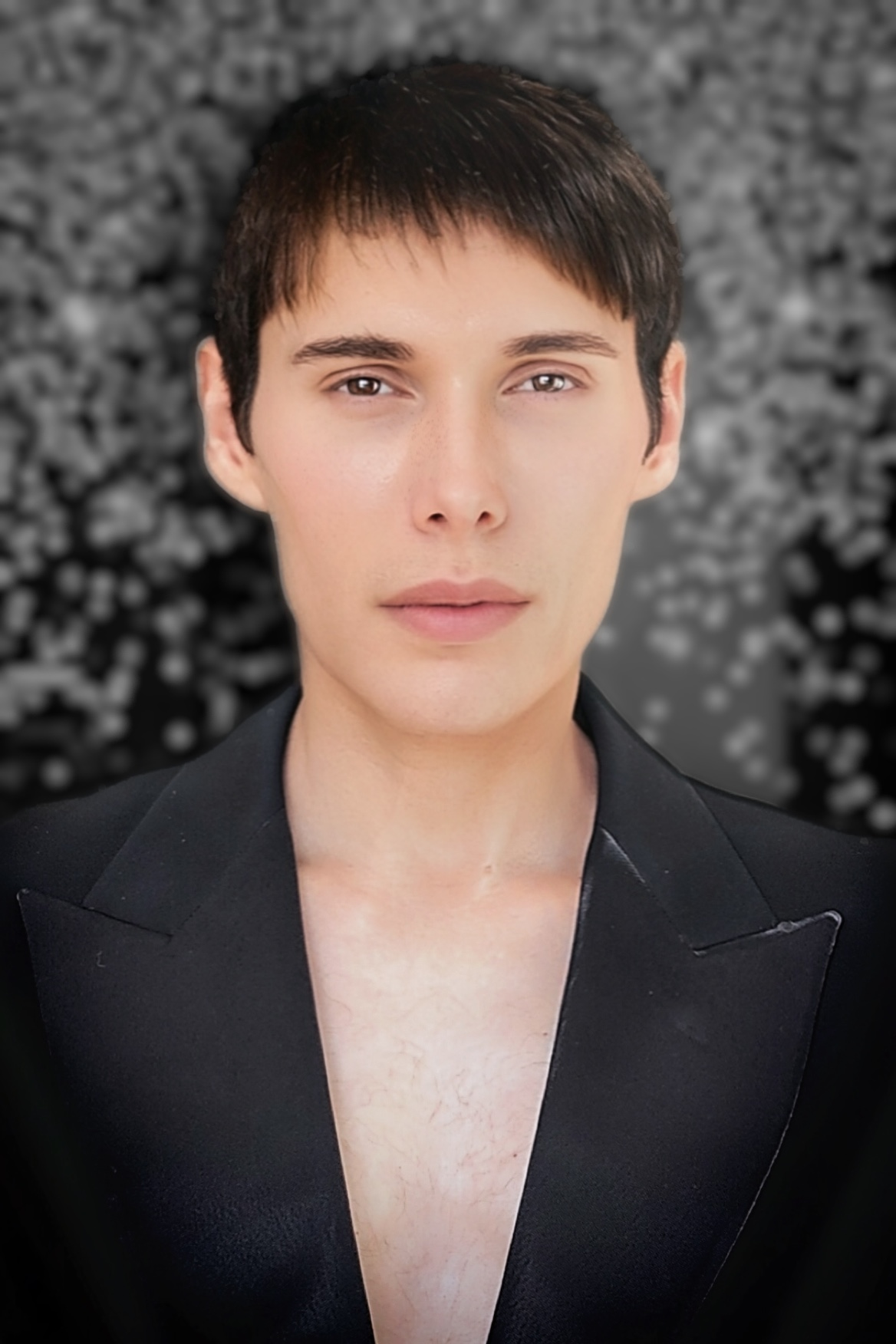
- Born: United States
- Education: Los Angeles County High School for the Arts
- Occupation: Actor

Guy Perry is an American actor.

Perry is best known for films and television series such as The New Daughter, Zoolander, The Shield, Nip/Tuck and True Blood.

Perry portrayed the elf in the Virgin Mobile holiday ad campaign 12 Days of Chrismahanukwanzakah.

Perry also acted in the viral music video "Synthesizer" by Electric Six.
