= John Boyes (musician) =

British photographer and musician

John Boyes (born 31 August 1966) is an English progressive rock guitarist and a commercial, editorial and advertising photographer. His musical career began when he replaced the original guitarist, Jim Harris, in the band Freefall in 1990, and most recently contributing to former Freefall bandmate, songwriter and producer Jem Godfrey's progressive band Frost*, on the formative recordings for their first album Milliontown. On the photography front he was winner of the 2005 Shot Up North Photography award for "Best Image".

Born in Cobham, Surrey in the United Kingdom, Boyes currently resides between Leeds and Hull in the East Riding of Yorkshire.
