= Frost (British band) =

British prog rock band

Frost*
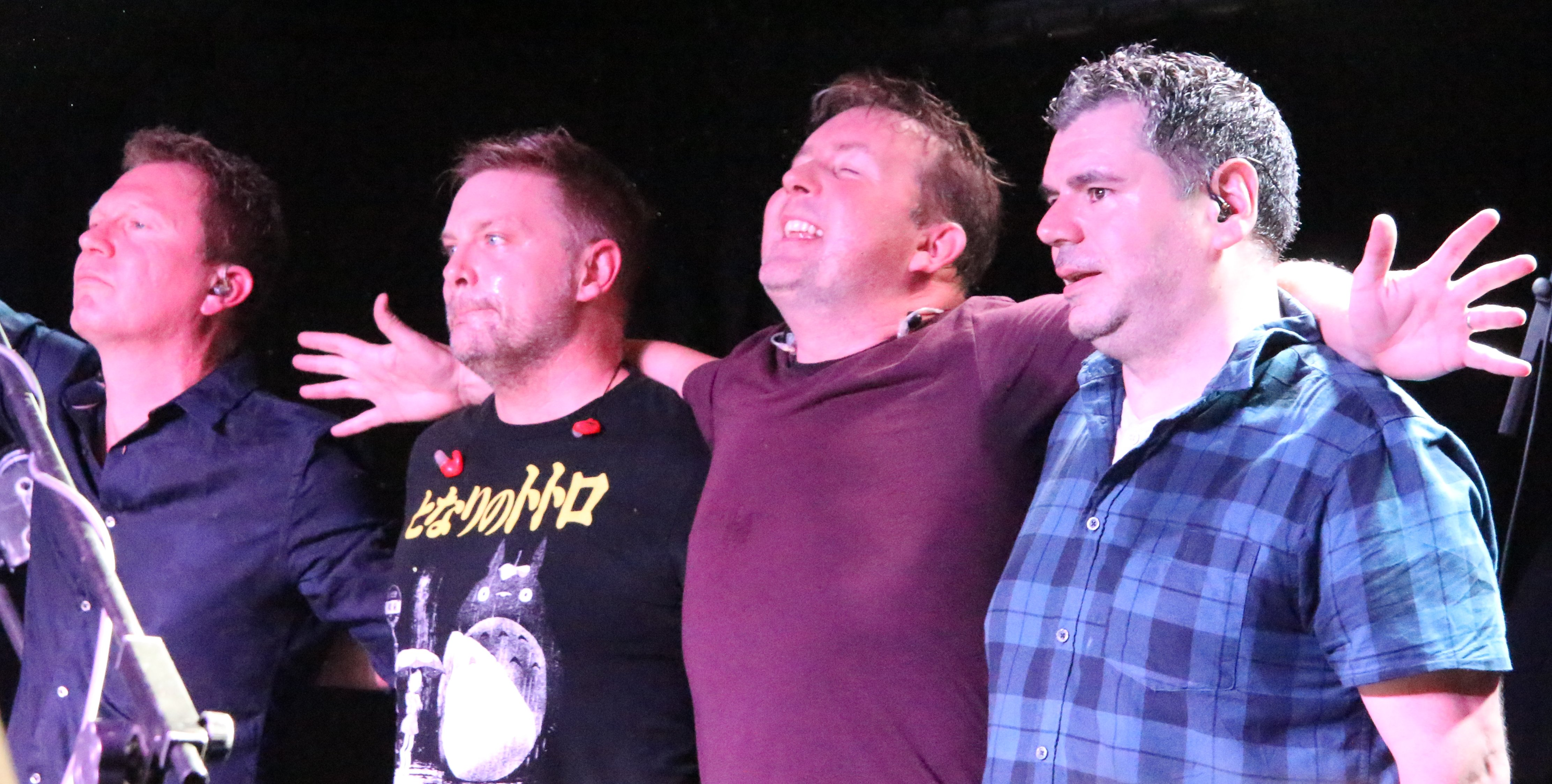
- Frost* in 2017

Background information
- Origin: England
- Genres: Neo-prog; electronic rock; pop rock
- Years active: 2004–2006, 2008–2011, 2011–present
- Label: InsideOut
- Members: Jem Godfrey; John Mitchell; Nathan King; Craig Blundell
- Past members: John Jowitt; Andy Edwards; John Boyes; Declan Burke
- Website: frost.life

Frost (stylised as Frost*) are an English neo-prog supergroup, formed in 2004 by Jem Godfrey and members of Arena, Kino, and IQ. Frost* released their first studio album, Milliontown, in 2006, before splitting up. In 2008, Godfrey reformed Frost*, adding Darwin's Radio vocalist and guitarist, Declan Burke, to the lineup, and released their second album, Experiments in Mass Appeal. The band disbanded again in 2011, to reunite later in September, after a brief hiatus.

Frost* released their third studio album Falling Satellites in 2016 and followed up with their fourth album Day and Age in 2021. In 2024, Frost* released their fifth studio album Life in the Wires.

== Band history ==
=== Formation (2004–2005) ===
Frost* was formed in September 2004, by songwriter, producer and musician Jem Godfrey - better known for his work creating hits for bands including Atomic Kitten - when he made a decision to return to his own musical past writing and playing progressive music, in the band Freefall.

After writing and recording material on his own for several months, and listening to a broad selection of contemporary progressive music, Godfrey first approached John Mitchell of Arena, The Urbane and Kino, (and later lead guitarist and singer for It Bites until their 2014 hiatus and subsequent disbanding in 2019). Mitchell then introduced Godfrey to John Jowitt (also of Arena, and additionally IQ and Jadis), subsequently leading to meeting Andy Edwards (ex Robert Plant and IQ). John Boyes, Godfrey's former band-mate in Freefall in the 1990s, and from the band Rook, had already performed significant rhythm guitar work on the early recordings. With the lineup in place, recording of the first album was completed during winter 2005.

When asked in an interview why there is an asterisk next to the band name, Godfrey replied "That is a serving suggestion; if you get to put it on it means 'serve chilled'! or 'may contain nuts'!"

=== Milliontown (2006) ===
Frost*'s first album was named after the 26 minute long final track, which was inspired by the book The Apprentice by Gordon Houghton. The album was released in the United States on 18 July 2006 and in Europe on 24 July. The band went on a brief tour to play a selection from the album, supporting Pallas on a four date tour of the Netherlands and Germany in October 2006.

=== Dissolution, rebirth, Experiments In Mass Appeal (2006–2009) ===
Shortly after returning from the tour, Godfrey announced on the band's blog on MySpace and reiterated by InsideOut in a bulletin on the same site two days later (expired) - that due to his increasing professional and personal commitments elsewhere, Frost* would be dissolved after fulfilling four remaining concert dates. It later emerged that an appearance at the Rites of Spring festival (RoSfest) in 2007, in America, the final scheduled date, had been cancelled. The final appearance of Frost* for the time being, in support of their album Milliontown, was back-up for The Flower Kings at The Scala in Kings Cross, London, on 10 December 2006.

However, in early 2007, Godfrey revived the band name and wrote in his blog about writing material for a second album. Following the band's reformation, Godfrey recruited Declan Burke of Darwin's Radio to contribute vocals and guitars on the follow-up album, Experiments in Mass Appeal which was released worldwide on 17 November 2008. Throughout 2008 Godfrey posted several videos on YouTube called "Frost* Reports," under the user name Planetfrost. In between the recording in early 2008, Frost* supported Spock's Beard for a small tour.

In November 2008 Andy Edwards announced that, due to his new job as a college lecturer, he would no longer play live with the band, although he might be involved in future recording work. In January 2009, Nick D'Virgilio of Spock's Beard was announced as guest drummer for Frost*'s performance in May at RoSfest 2009.

In May 2009 John Jowitt announced his departure from the band. With gigs scheduled in support of Dream Theater, Jem announced bass would be played Level 42 guitarist Nathan King, with Andy Edwards briefly rejoining the band for these dates.

On 29 May 2009, Jem announced via AudioBoo that a live Frost* album, recorded at RoSfest 2009, would be titled The Philadelphia Experiment. Excerpts from that performance were released as a limited edition EP, titled FrostFest Live CD, including a new song called "The Forget You Song", recorded at Godfrey's home studio The Cube in East Sussex.

Subsequent to RoSfest, Dec Burke left the band. Jem Godfrey, John Mitchell and Nathan King performed some low key gigs as a drummerless trio before recruiting new drummer Craig Blundell.

=== The Dividing Line, "Indefinite" Hiatus (2010–2011) ===
On 2 February 2010, Jem announced via his blog that he had been invited to participate in the 10th anniversary party of The Dividing Line Broadcast Network, Vancouver, British Columbia's internet-based progressive rock radio station. Godfrey accepted, and, to thank them for their support of Frost*, tasked himself to write and record a new Frost* song, aptly titled, "The Dividing Line," to be completed within the eight weeks then remaining until the party.

Godfrey gathered not only fellow Frost* mates John Mitchell (It Bites), Andy Edwards, Dec Burke and Nathan King, but also enlisted the talents of Tara Busch, Mark "madfiddler" Knight, Lyndon Connah and original Frost* guitarist, John Boyes, for the one-off project. A special Frost* Report, Dividing Line edition, was posted on Godfrey's blog, as well as PlanetFrost*, the band's YouTube channel, providing a video chronicle of the song's status.

Jem announced on 31 March on the Frost* forum that the track was completed and would be included as a bonus track on the 2-disc live album, The Philadelphia Experiment. "The Dividing Line" premiered during The Dividing Line's 10th anniversary broadcast on Saturday, 3 April 2010.

Frost* played a small number of shows in the U.K. in December 2010. On 1 March 2011, Godfrey announced that he had put the band on indefinite hiatus. He stated that the main reasons for his decision were that he felt uncomfortable as the band leader, and that the increased workload from running the band was having a negative impact on his health.

=== Return of Frost*, third studio album Falling Satellites (2011–2018) ===
On 16 September 2011, Godfrey announced via his blog that Frost* would once again be returning for a third album, stating "As yet I have no idea of the form, shape, personnel or sound of this new album, but it will definitely be Frost* shaped. I'll once again be making Frost* reports available online during the process and it'll no doubt be a bloody madhouse throughout, but that's Frost*". The band performed a sold-out Christmas show at the House of Progression, Kingston upon Thames on 16 December 2011.

On 12 May 2013, Frost* played at Celebr8.2 Prog Festival at the Hippodrome. In December 2013 Frost* released The Rockfield Files, a CD/DVD package documenting "live in studio" performances of older material plus then-new piece "Heartstrings", recorded at Rockfield Studios (Monmouth, Wales UK) in early January 2013.

In May 2015, Godfrey announced on Facebook that a new Frost* album was in progress – “New album underway. JM, CB and NK all in. Release scheduled for ’16. Writing nearly complete. Recording in Autumn”. Writing was completed in late October 2015; recording began in December and was completed on 17 February 2016.

On 17 January 2016, Godfrey announced the new album would be called ‘Falling Satellites’, and later announced a U.K. tour for June/July 2016 to promote the new album. The tour included an appearance on the Prog Stage at the 2016 Ramblin Man Fair, Mote Park, Maidstone, Kent, UK on Saturday 23 July 2016, playing a cut-down set of four songs.

Falling Satellites was released on 27 May 2016. The band's first ever official music video (for the track 'Numbers') debuted shortly after on 31 May 2016. Additional dates were performed in 2017, including that year's "Cruise To The Edge" and an appearance at Dingwalls in London that was recorded for future video release (tentatively titled "Failing Satellite").

=== Departure of Craig Blundell, Others EP (2019) ===
Frost* once again performed on the 2019 Cruise To The Edge (with Nick D'Virgilio filling in for Craig Blundell), along with a small number of dates in Canada in March.

On 15 May 2019, it was announced that drummer Craig Blundell had left the band due to scheduling conflicts caused by being entirely too successful.

In July 2019, Frost* released an EP titled Others, comprising six older, previously unfinished tracks recorded with either Andy Edwards or Craig Blundell on drums. In September 2019, the band shared three tracks from this forthcoming EP on SoundCloud, 'Exhibit A', 'Fathom' and ' Postcard'. The Others EP was released digitally through InsideOut Music on 5 June 2020. It was also released on CD later that year as part of the limited “13 Winters” anthology-artbook, an 8 disk set with remasters of most of their previous releases.

=== 13 Winters collection, fourth studio album Day and Age (2020–present) ===
Starting 16 September 2019, Godfrey and John Mitchell spent a week in Cornwall working on material for the band's fourth studio album. "Podcasts" of the two conversing were recorded each evening at area pubs and uploaded on SoundCloud.

On 20 November 2020 Frost* released the eight CD retrospective and audiobook 13 Winters. The collection contains remastered collections of previous releases, and includes rare and live mixes.

Frost* released their fourth full-length studio album, Day And Age, on 14 May 2021. Godfrey, Mitchell, and King recorded the album over the course of 2019 and 2020, along with guest drummers Kaz Rodriguez (Chaka Khan, Josh Groban), Darby Todd (The Darkness, Martin Barre), and Pat Mastelotto. There is also spoken word on the fourth track, 'The Boy Who Stood Still', done by Jason Isaacs.

Frost* released their fifth full-length studio album, Life in the Wires, on 17 Oct 2024. Drummer Craig Blundell rejoined Frost* as a full band member prior to recording this album.

== Line-up ==
Current members

- Jem Godfrey – vocals, keyboards, Chapman Railboard (2004–2006, 2008–2011, 2011–present)
- John Mitchell – guitars, vocals (2004–2006, 2008–2011, 2011–present)
- Nathan King – bass, backing vocals (2009–2011, 2011–present)
- Craig Blundell – drums (2009–2011, 2011–2019, 2022–present)

Former members

- John Jowitt – bass, backing vocals (2004–2006, 2008–2009)
- Andy Edwards – drums (2004–2006, 2008–2011)
- John Boyes – guitars (2004–2006)
- Declan Burke – vocals, guitars (2008–2009)

Former touring members

- Nick D'Virgilio – drums (2009, 2019)
- Alex Thomas – drums (2009–2010)

Guest musicians on Day and Age

- Kaz Rodriguez – drums (2021)
- Darby Todd – drums (2021)
- Pat Mastelotto – drums (2021)

== Discography ==
=== Albums ===
- Milliontown (2006)
- Experiments in Mass Appeal (2008)
- Falling Satellites (2016)
- Day and Age (2021)
- Life in the Wires (2024)

=== Other ===
- Frost* Tour Sampler (2008; only available on tour)
- FrostFest Live CD (2009)
- The Philadelphia Experiment (2010)
- The Rockfield Files (2013; available at The Merch Desk)
- Others EP (2020)
- 13 Winters collection (2020)
- Island Live (2023)
