= Falling Satellites =

Studio album by Frost*
- Released: 27 May 2016
- Studio: The Cube, Strongroom, The Outhouse
- Genre: Neo-prog
- Length: 56:21
- Label: InsideOut
- Producer: Jem Godfrey

Frost* chronology
The Rockfield Files (2015)	Falling Satellites (2016)	Day and Age (2021)

Professional ratings
Review scores
Source	Rating
Heavy Blog Is Heavy	5/5 stars
The Prog Mind	8.5/10 stars

Falling Satellites is the third studio album by British neo-prog group Frost*. It was their only studio album to feature drummer Craig Blundell until 2024s Life in The Wires.

Jem Godfrey explained in an interview that the concept of the album is:

In this instance – life. This is my midlife crisis album! The whole album is a message to enjoy life while you have it. My dad died 4 weeks before I completed "Falling Satellites" and I suddenly realized how fleeting life actually is. He'd been procrastinating for years while writing a book he'd always wanted to write when he died. But now it will never be finished and it made me understand that every single second of being alive is precious. The whole album is about that – do that thing you've been meaning to do for ages NOW and get it done..

== Track listing ==
All tracks are written by Jem Godfrey unless otherwise noted.

No.	Title	Writer(s)	Length
1.	"First Day"		1:37
2.	"Numbers"		4:21
3.	"Towerblock"		6:13
4.	"Signs"	Godfrey, John Mitchell	6:36
5.	"Lights Out"		3:52

Sunlight (33:34)
No.	Title	Writer(s)	Length
6.	"I. Heartstrings"	Godfrey, Mitchell	6:20
7.	"II. Closer to the Sun"		7:20
8.	"III. The Raging Against the Dying of the Light Blues in 7/8"		7:49
9.	"IV. Nice Day for It..."	Godfrey, Mitchell	6:37
10.	"V. Hypoventilate"		2:00
11.	"VI. Last Day"		3:01
Total length:			56:21

Special edition bonus tracks
No.	Title	Writer(s)	Length
12.	"Lantern"	Godfrey, Mitchell	3:45
13.	"British Wintertime"		6:30

== Personnel ==
- Jem Godfrey – keyboards, piano, Chapman Railboard, vocals
- John Mitchell – electric guitars, violin, vocals
- Nathan King – bass guitar
- Craig Blundell – drums
- Joe Satriani – guitar solo (track 7)
- Tori Beumont – vocals (track 5)
- Mark Knight – violin (track 8)
