= AD/BC: A Rock Opera =

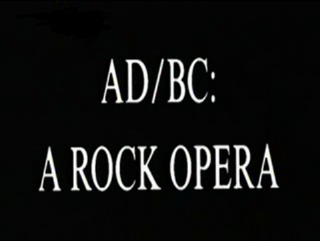
- AD/BC: A Rock Opera logo
- Also known as: The BBC3 Christmas Rock Opera: AD/BC
- Genre: Parody; Musical
- Written by: Richard Ayoade; Matt Berry
- Directed by: Richard Ayoade
- Starring: Matt Berry; Julian Barratt; Richard Ayoade
- Music by: Matt Berry
- Country of origin: United Kingdom
- Original language: English
- No. of episodes: 1

Production
- Executive producers: Steve Coogan; Mark Freeland; Henry Normal
- Producer: Alison MacPhail
- Editor: Chris Dickens
- Camera setup: Single-camera
- Running time: 30 minutes
- Production company: Baby Cow Productions

Original release
- Network: BBC Three
- Release: 21 December 2004

AD/BC is a parody rock opera with music by Matt Berry and lyrics by Matt Berry and Richard Ayoade. It premiered on BBC Three on 21 December 2004.

It was produced by Steve Coogan's production company Baby Cow and features friends and colleagues of the writers, including The Mighty Boosh's Noel Fielding and Julian Barratt, Julia Davis, Rich Fulcher, and Matt Lucas, as well as Berry and Ayoade themselves.

== Plot ==
The opera is a pastiche of the life-of-Christ rock operas popular in the early 1970s, such as Jesus Christ Superstar, and Godspell. The production parodies familiar, anachronistic elements — such as crowds gathered behind chain-link fencing, 1970s products like chrome floor lamps, and telephone booths — juxtaposed against the 1 BC Judean setting. It also features 1970s-appropriate music, clothes, language, and choreography. Comic motifs include the use of poorly synchronized and mixed dubbing, and high, hard-rock-style vocal notes, in the manner of 1970s Robert Plant or Ian Gillan, inserted incongruously and sustained for absurdly long durations.

Sitting at a piano in 1978, writer Tim Wynde introduces his creation as a new telling of the birth of Christ, "told in rock" from the point of view of the Innkeeper.

In the city of Bethlehem, the Innkeeper's business is suffering due to competition from Tony Iscariot's flashier motel. Depressed, the Innkeeper plans to hang himself. God admonishes him, and instructs the Innkeeper to prepare for the arrival of "a shining star." He mistakes the "star" to mean standup comedian King Herod, who is on tour.

Meanwhile, in the desert, Joseph builds a fire for himself and the pregnant Mary during their journey to Bethlehem.

Tony summons the Innkeeper and demands rent. The Innkeeper doesn't have the money, but is confident that King Herod will stay at his inn, leading to an influx of cash. Tony threatens the Innkeeper that he better have the rent by that night or else he will meet a grim end.

Planning for the arrival of King Herod, the Innkeeper kicks everyone out of his inn, including his mother-in-law. His wife, Ruth, is angered by this, accuses him of "chasing dreams," and leaves. She and Tony consider rekindling their past romance.

The Innkeeper waits for hours, but King Herod never arrives. He fears that he was wrong about "the star," misses Ruth, and feels tricked by God. Joseph arrives at the inn and asks for a room. The Innkeeper, drinking and refusing to give up hope, says he can't accommodate Joseph's family because King Herod will arrive soon. The Innkeeper offers his shed as an alternative, which Joseph accepts.

In a nearby field, three wise men have been following a bright star in search of the Christ Child. They are led by three shepherds to the inn, and are followed by dancing townsfolk, Tony, and Ruth.

Upon arriving at the crib of Jesus, the clothing of Tony, Ruth, and the Innkeeper turns white from the baby's holy presence. The Innkeeper apologizes to Ruth for being unkind. Tony tells Ruth to return to her husband, and he withdraws the demand for the Innkeeper's rent, apologizing for trying to make his "30 pieces of silver." Everyone dances in celebration of Jesus's birth.

An epilogue explains that the Innkeeper's fortunes improve after he and Tony call a truce. The two men work together and pioneer optional continental breakfasts in hotels. Ruth becomes a successful manager of the inn. Joseph and Jesus try to keep in contact with the Innkeeper, but eventually lose touch.

== Cast ==
- Innkeeper/Tim Wynde – Matt Berry
- Tony Iscariot/Roger Kingsmen – Julian Barratt
- Joseph/C.T. Homerton – Richard Ayoade
- God/Caplan Joyce – Matt Lucas
- Ruth/Maria Preston-Bush – Julia Davis
- Shepherd – Noel Fielding
- Shepherd – Karl Theobald
- Shepherd – Tom Hillenbrand
- Wise Man – Lucy Montgomery
- Wise Man – Lydia Fox
- Wise Man – Sophie Winkleman
- Townsfolk – Graham Linehan, Rob Tofield, Rich Fulcher and Laurence Fox

== Reception ==
In 2016, Sophie Davies of CultBox noted that AD/BC's "seems to have slipped under the radar of even the most ardent comedy fans." Davies pointed to highlights such as "Julian Barratt having a lot of fun playing the slimy villain," and "Matt Berry’s voice is suited to this over-the-top style of music"

Leah Schnelbach of Tor.com praised the special as "a (literally) note-perfect parody of ’70s religious musicals, wrapped in a mockumentary about the making of the musical itself," and felt "part of the fun is in watching the writers and actors play with the show’s layering."

== Release ==
Though reported by some sources as having aired only once, on BBC Three, the BBC Three Programme Index lists a repeat airing on 3 January 2005 at 11:30pm, and the BBC lists airings on 21 December, 24 December, and 31 December 2004, as well as 3 January 2005, also on BBC Three.

AD/BC was released on DVD in the UK on 19 November 2007.
