= The Caxton Private Lending Library & Book Depository =

2013 short story by John Connolly

- First edition
- Author: John Connolly
- Genre: Short Stories, Fiction, Fantasy
- Published: 2013
- Publisher: Mysterious Press
- Awards: Edgar Award for Best Short Story (2014); Anthony Award for Best Short Story (2014)
- ISBN: 978-1-613-16052-7
- Website: The Caxton Private Lending Library and Book Depository

The Caxton Private Lending Library & Book Depository is a short story written by John Connolly and published by Mysterious Press in January 2013, which later went on to win the Edgar Award and Anthony Award for best short story in 2014.
