= Sax Appeal =

British jazz band

Sax Appeal is a UK-based jazz band led by Derek Nash, originally formed in Manchester in 1979.

The band's regular line-up comprises five saxophones (Nash, Mornington Lockett, Scott Garland (now left the lineup because of Parkinson's disease), Gary Plumley, Matt Wates and Bob Mckay) with a rhythm section (comprising Mike Bradley on drums, Phil Scragg on bass guitar, and Pete Adams on keyboards). Most of the pieces are original, usually composed by Nash, with some by his father, Pat Nash, and all arranging is by Nash. As well as its core members, the band has had guest appearances by Jools Holland, Simon Allen, Nigel Hitchcock, Dave O'Higgins, Paul Booth, Tim Garland.

The band won a British Jazz Award for Best Small Group in 2000, and the John Dankworth award in 1994.

The band sometimes expands to become the Sax Appeal Big Band, where the saxophone section is joined by four trumpets and three trombones, including Winston Rollins, Martin Gladdish, Richard Henry, Martin Shaw, Jon Scott, Danny Marsden and Gabriel Garrick.

== Discography ==
- Flat Out (Jazzizit, 1991)
- Let's Go (Jazzizit, 1994)
- Outside In (Jazzizit, 1997)
- Take No Prisoners (Jazzizit, 2000)
- Sax Appeal (New Team Music, 2003)
- The Flatiron Suite (Jazzizit, 2005)
- Funkerdeen (Jazzizit, 2014)
- Big Bad Trouble (Jazzizit, 2019)
