= Toast of London =

British TV sitcom

- Title card for series 1–3
- Also known as: Toast of Tinseltown
- Genre: Sitcom
- Created by: Matt Berry; Arthur Mathews
- Written by: Matt Berry; Arthur Mathews
- Directed by: Michael Cumming
- Starring: Matt Berry; Robert Bathurst; Doon Mackichan; Harry Peacock; Tim Downie; Shazad Latif; Tracy-Ann Oberman; Fred Armisen; Rashida Jones
- Theme music composer: Matt Berry
- Opening theme: "Take My Hand"
- Ending theme: "Beatmaker" (Toast of Tinseltown)
- Country of origin: United Kingdom
- Original language: English
- No. of series: 4
- No. of episodes: 25

Production
- Producers: Kate Daughton (Toast of London); Charlie Leech (Toast of Tinseltown)
- Running time: 23 minutes (Toast of London); 28 minutes (Toast of Tinseltown)
- Production companies: Objective Media Group; Objective Fiction (2022) wiip studios (2022)

Original release
- Network: Channel 4
- Release: 20 October 2013 – 23 December 2015
- Network: BBC Two
- Release: 4 January – 8 February 2022

Toast of London is a British television sitcom, created by Matt Berry and Arthur Mathews and starring Berry as Steven Toast, an eccentric, middle-aged actor with a chequered past who spends more time dealing with his problems offstage than performing on it.

Its fourth series, set in the United States, was titled Toast of Tinseltown.

== Production ==
All episodes are directed by Michael Cumming.

Three series, under the title Toast of London, were broadcast on Channel 4. Series 2 and 3 were shot at the West London Film Studios. In the United States, Toast of London was available on IFC.

In November 2017, after reports of a fourth series, Berry clarified that it will return "in some form at some point", but nothing was currently being written. Mathews later said that they had an idea for "Toast in America", but that no deadline was set. In December 2017, Channel 4 officially renewed the show for a fourth series.

During the COVID-19 pandemic, a YouTube channel with new audio skits of Toast of London was created, while in 2021 the "Toast in America" series was confirmed as a six-part television project for the BBC, under the title Toast of Tinseltown. The series debuted on BBC Two on 4 January 2022 with all episodes of Toast of Tinseltown uploaded to the BBC iPlayer at the same time, alongside the three series of Toast of London.

== Cast and characters ==
=== Overview ===
Character	Portrayed by	Toast of London					Toast of Tinseltown
Character	Portrayed by	Pilot	Series 1	Series 2	Series 3	COVID-19 Specials	Toast of Tinseltown
Character	Portrayed by	2012	2013	2014	2015	2021	2022
Main characters
Steven Toast	Matt Berry	Main	Main	Main	Main	Main	Main
Jane Plough	Fiona Mollison	Main					
Jane Plough	Doon Mackichan		Main	Main	Main	Guest	Guest
Brooke; Hooberman	Doon Mackichan						Main
Ed; Howzer-Black	Robert Bathurst	Main	Main	Main	Main	Main	Main
Rupert; Howzer-Black	Robert Bathurst			Main			
Ray "Bloody" Purchase	Harry Peacock	Main	Main	Main	Main	Main	Main
Bill Purchase	Harry Peacock				Main		
Danny Bear	Tim Downie	Main	Main	Main	Main	Main	Main
Clem H. Fandango	Shazad Latif	Main	Main	Main	Main	Main	Main
Mrs. Purchase	Tracy-Ann Oberman	Main	Main	Main	Main	Main	Main
Russ Nightlife; D. B. Cooper	Fred Armisen						Main
Billy Tarzana	Rashida Jones						Main
Milly Tarzana	Rashida Jones						Main

=== Main ===
- Matt Berry as Steven Gonville Toast, the central character of the series. A bumbling, single, self-important actor who unsuccessfully attempts to become a ladies' man and often the bearer of bad fortune. Toast considers himself a success despite his obviously failing career.
  - Berry also portrays a younger version of Steven's father, Colonel Gonville Toast, in the series 3 episode "Beauty Calls".
- Doon Mackichan as Jane Plough (which she pronounces "pluff" /plʌf/) like "Clough", Toast's unhelpful agent. Prim and posh, she sees herself as superior to Toast, despite her failure to provide him with decent work. She was played by Fiona Mollison in the pilot.
  - Mackichan also plays Brooke Hooberman, Toast's US agent in Toast of Tinseltown.
- Robert Bathurst as Ed Howzer-Black, Toast's landlord and an idle retired actor.
  - Bathurst also portrays Ed's father, Rupert Howzer-Black, in the series 3 episode "Beauty Calls".
- Harry Peacock as Ray "Bloody" Purchase, Toast's fellow actor and rival, and a virulent homophobe. The two hate each other with a vengeance and are constantly in competition. While Purchase often seems to have the upper hand, Toast is still sometimes able to come out on top.
  - Peacock also portrays Ray's albino twin brother, Bill Purchase, in the series 3 episode "Man of Sex".
- Tim Downie as Danny Bear, a studio sound engineer and stereotypical hipster who regularly hires Toast for voiceover work in a London studio.
- Shazad Latif as Clem H. Fandango, another hipster who is doing work experience in the recording studio. Clem routinely says to Toast, "Hello, Steven? This is Clem Fandango. Can you hear me?" to which Toast is forced to reply with some variation of "Yes. I can hear you, Clem Fandango."
- Tracy-Ann Oberman as Mrs. Purchase, the wife of Ray Purchase and a sex worker who is enjoying an affair with Toast. Despite being a sex worker, the only person she ever charges for sex is her husband.

In Toast of Tinseltown, additional main characters include:

- Fred Armisen as Russ Nightlife/D. B. Cooper, Toast's eccentric and reclusive roommate in Los Angeles.
- Rashida Jones as Billy/Milly Tarzana, Nightlife's housekeeper.

=== Recurring ===
- Adrian Lukis as Colonel Blair Toast, Steven's eccentric older brother. An army veteran, he lost his hand in the Falklands War and now uses a stuffed rubber glove as a replacement.
- Amanda Donohoe as Ellen, Toast's abusive and volatile ex-wife. Despite her poor treatment of him, Toast continues to have feelings for her.
- Alan Ford as Alan, who is a hypnotist and a homeopath. Ford also appears as a taxi driver called "Mick Carriage"
- Peter Davison plays a fictionalised version of himself.
- Morgana Robinson makes one appearance in each of the four series, each time as a different character. She portrays Jemima Gina in "Addictive Personality", Lorna Wynde in "Fool in Love", Emma in "Beauty Calls" and Wildcat Lil in "Death Valley".
- Geoffrey McGivern appears as three separate one-off characters, all of whom were temperamental directors working with Toast. He portrays Cliff Promise in "The Unspeakable Play", Acker Herron in "Afternoon Tea", and Norris Flipjack in "Desperate Measures".
- Daniel Cook appears as Colin Skittles in series 2 and Cliff Bonanza in series 3.

=== Guest ===
- Aidan Turner as Barney
- Anthony Atamanuik as Donald Trump
- Benedict Wong as Rusty Halloween
- Bob Mortimer as himself
- Bill Hader as Dwight Difference
- Brian Blessed as Col. Gonville Toast
- Carol Cleveland as First Brooke Hooberman
- Colin MacFarlane as Weech Beacon
- Daisy Ridley as Stagehand
- David Arnold as Club Pianist
- Freddie Fox as Edward Fox
- Guy Combes as Daniel Day-Lewis
- James Lance as Martin Aynuss
- Jamie Demetriou as Troy
- John Nettles as himself
- John Simm as himself
- Jon Hamm as Hamm/himself
- Josh Homme as himself
- Jude Law as himself
- Kayvan Novak as Des Wigwam
- Larry David as Sola Mirronek
- Lewis MacLeod as Dr. Who (Fourth Doctor)/Announcer/Stanley Kubrick/Orson Welles
- Lindsay Duncan as herself
- Lorraine Kelly as herself
- Louise Jameson as Wendy Nook
- Martin Freeman as himself
- Matthew Holness as Max Gland
- Michael Ball as himself
- Natasia Demetriou as Carmen
- Pat Shortt as Larry Muggins
- Paul Rudd as himself
- Paul Whitehouse as Vic Titball
- Richard Gibson as Denis Thwaites
- Sally Dexter as Yvonne Wryly
- Sam Mendes as himself
- Simon Cartwright as Bob Monkhouse
- Sheila Hancock as herself
- Stanley Townsend as Mr. Fusili
- Steve Pemberton as Francis Bacon
- Susan Wokoma as Nina Armenian
- Terry Mynott as Boris Johnson/Jeremy Paxman/Axel Jacklin
- Tim Pigott-Smith as himself
- Vic Reeves as Compere

== Episodes ==
=== Series overview ===
Series	Episodes	Originally released		
Series	Episodes	First released	Last released	Network
Pilot	1	20 August 2012		Channel 4
1	6	20 October 2013	24 November 2013	Channel 4
2	6	3 November 2014	8 December 2014	Channel 4
3	6	18 November 2015	23 December 2015	Channel 4
Tinseltown	6	4 January 2022	8 February 2022	BBC Two

=== Pilot episode (2012) ===
Title	Directed by	Written by	Original release date
"The Unspeakable Play"	Michael Cumming	Arthur Mathews and Matt Berry	20 August 2012
Toast has recently divorced. He is living with his middle-aged friend Ed and Ed's elderly agoraphobic mistress Goodhouse. Ed's wife lives in Eswatini. Toast is starring in a play that is so bad and controversial that no one says its name – and protesters are outside the theatre. Toast auditions for a part in a TV drama as a gay undercover detective. The producer, Cliff, is in prison for holocaust denial, so Toast has to audition whilst visiting Cliff. Another inmate thinks Toast actually is a policeman and attacks him. Ray Purchase, a rival actor whose wife is having an affair with Toast, attacks Toast. He is a police artist and frames Toast as a flasher.

=== Series 1 (2013) ===
No. overall	No. in series	Title	Directed by	Written by	Original release date
1	1	"Addictive Personality"	Michael Cumming	Arthur Mathews and Matt Berry	20 October 2013
Toast is about to have sex with an attractive young woman, Jemima, at her flat. He leaves when he sees that she is wearing an ankle monitor and was convicted of attempted murder for stabbing her boyfriend. She stalks him. Toast meets attractive young journalist Susan. She throws a supermarket trolley in a canal, then tells him that she is a recovering alcoholic. When she takes him to her flat, he sees that she is an extreme hoarder. Jemima turns up at Susan's flat and is arrested by the police. Susan rejects Toast for being weird. Kikini Bamalam, the daughter of the Nigerian ambassador, has been the victim of unscrupulous plastic surgery by Ray Purchase, which has made her look like Bruce Forsyth, so Ed invites her to stay at the flat to recuperate. Toast is informed that he will be the recipient of an acting award, which he is told by his agent Jane Plough is for Best Actor. She later tells him that the award is for Worst Actor. He sends Kikini to accept the award on his behalf. Guest appearances: Morgana Robinson as Jemima Gina and Emma Fryer as Susan Random.
2	2	"Afternoon Tea"	Michael Cumming	Arthur Mathews and Matt Berry	27 October 2013
Toast has a part in a new play but tries to get out of it when he hears the director has murdered actors whom he found difficult. The director is displeased with Toast's attitude, so he and Ray confront Toast. While chasing a romantic endeavour, Toast runs into an old acting classmate. Toast hires a hotel room and a call girl. Things go wrong for Toast when he finds out that he has been set up, unknowingly to both, to be a part of the classmate's documentary about prostitution. Guest appearances: Geoffrey McGivern as Acker Herron and Emily Bruni as Kika Bright.
3	3	"Vanity Project"	Michael Cumming	Arthur Mathews and Matt Berry	3 November 2013
In need of money to fund his divorce, Toast agrees to act in a vanity film about Prince Philip. Guest appearances: Alan Ford as Mick Carriage, Amanda Donohoe as Ellen Toast, James Lance as Martin Aynuss, and Stanley Townsend as Mr. Fasili.
4	4	"Submission"	Michael Cumming	Arthur Mathews and Matt Berry	10 November 2013
After performing voice-overs for the Royal Navy on a recent project, Toast is invited to the launch of their new nuclear submarine, the "Penetrator". Guest appearances: Terence Harvey as Lord Fotheringham, Rufus Jones as Toby Hopkinson-Finch, and Rachel Shelley as Commander Scott-Gorham.
5	5	"The End"	Michael Cumming	Arthur Mathews and Matt Berry	17 November 2013
Toast meets a young Indian woman, Kate, and her aunt, Deepa, in a bar. Kate says that Deepa is deaf and blind. Toast and Kate have sex together twice whilst Deepa is in the room. The footage is uploaded to the internet, where it is viewed 500,000 times. Toast is tired of doing voice-overs and appearing every night in his bad play. With the help of a new agent, Brooke, he tries to become an author of erotic literature. His manuscript is well-received, but it requires an ending, which he has difficulty writing. He decides to have the protagonist spontaneously combust. The laziness of that enrages his literary agent, who spontaneously combusts in front of Toast. Jane is angry with Toast for trying to find a new agent. Guest appearances: Carol Cleveland as Brooke Hooberman.
6	6	"Bonus Ball"	Michael Cumming	Matt Berry and Arthur Mathews	24 November 2013
After losing £20,000 to Andrew Lloyd Webber in a celebrity poker game, Toast finds himself hunted by musical superstar and part-time West End theatre enforcer Michael Ball. Ray becomes determined to kill Toast after discovering Toast's affair with his wife. Ball approaches Toast on stage in the middle of his bad play, while Ray tries to shoot him. Ray shoots Ball instead, who dies on stage. The event is mistaken for part of the play, which receives rave reviews. Guest appearances: Michael Ball.

=== Series 2 (2014) ===
No. overall	No. in series	Title	Directed by	Written by	Original release date
7	1	"Match Fit"	Michael Cumming	Arthur Mathews and Matt Berry	3 November 2014
Toast is sent by Jane to what she tells him is an audition to play Charles Dickens. However, the position available is for a tour guide for "What the Dickens", an open-top bus tour of London. Toast reluctantly does the tour, during which he encounters Ray, who is leading Beefeater anti-gay tours. Toast accepts Ed's invitation to the Celebrities and Prostitutes Blow Football Tournament and becomes determined to win. He pays a prostitute, Wendy Nook, to be his partner. They lose the final against Ray and his wife. However, the Purchases are disqualified because Mrs Purchase is not a genuine prostitute, so Toast and Wendy win. Toast's prize is to have unprotected sex with Mrs Purchase whilst Ray watches.
8	2	"Desperate Measures"	Michael Cumming	Arthur Mathews and Matt Berry	10 November 2014
After Ray informs the Inland Revenue, Toast receives a massive tax bill and is forced to take on some unappealing jobs to pay off the debt. He is hired to direct a stage version of Calendar Girls, but is soon sacked. One of the cast is flying him home when the plane crashes. Toast flies to the Democratic Republic of the Congo to make an advertisement for cigarettes.
9	3	"The Moosetrap"	Michael Cumming	Arthur Mathews and Matt Berry	17 November 2014
In a radio interview about the legendary whodunit play "The Moose Trap", Toast reveals the killer's identity. Toast also finds out through Blair that the announcer on University Challenge is retiring and applies for the role, much to Jane's annoyance. At the interview with Jeremy Paxman, Paxman questions Toast about revealing the end of the Moose Trap, leading to an altercation and Paxman falling out of a window. Audiences at the Moose Trap collapse, leading to the death of another actor, and the play is forced to close.
10	4	"High Winds Actor"	Michael Cumming	Arthur Mathews and Matt Berry	24 November 2014
After the tragic death of his friend Axel Jacklin, Britain's finest exponent of acting in high winds, Toast finds himself in demand for dramatic roles. Toast persuades Ed to let him join the Freemasons after discovering that Jacklin's director will only work with actors "on the square". Toast is fast-tracked into the Masons, but his co-star, Ray, informs the director, who fires him.
11	5	"Buried Alive!"	Michael Cumming	Arthur Mathews and Matt Berry	1 December 2014
Toast is very excited to land a major role in a big movie starring the legendary Max Gland. Max orders Toast to get him a dog, so Toast steals one from a girl. His first scene on set is to be buried alive, but before he can be dug up, Max shoots himself and the dog during an argument with the director. The shoot is abandoned, and Toast is left buried. Using his unnecessarily complicated new phone, he manages to survive and even speak to several contacts, but none of them come to his aid. He is eventually saved by a fracking drill.
12	6	"Fool in Love"	Michael Cumming	Arthur Mathews and Matt Berry	8 December 2014
An old heartbreaker flame of Toast's, Lorna Wynde, turns up in London. She seems to still have feelings for him, but he worries she is just trying to make her husband, Josh Homme, jealous. Meanwhile, Ed is hosting his niece Honeysuckle, who has a gluten allergy that makes her behave as if possessed, so Toast has to sleep on the sofa. Although Ed promises a homeopath is coming to cure Honeysuckle, Toast cannot cope and goes to stay with Francis Bacon, who persuades him to move in with Lorna. Toast goes to confront Lorna's husband but accidentally cuts off his nose while confronting him, upsetting Lorna. He returns home to find that Honeysuckle is worse than ever, when Alan the Homeopath (Alan Ford) finally arrives and immediately cures her.

=== Series 3 (2015) ===
No. overall	No. in series	Title	Directed by	Written by	Original release date
13	1	"Over the Moon"	Michael Cumming	Arthur Mathews and Matt Berry	18 November 2015
A tipsy Toast appears on the chat show Lorraine and tells a story from his past that could bring down the U.S. government. Meanwhile, an actor who can do a perfect impression of Toast starts poaching his voiceover work. After realising what he said to Lorraine, Toast suffers stage fright ahead of his starring role in Macbeth, and cannot let go of a pillar in his dressing room. Alan cuts the pillar free and Toast performs while holding onto it. He is praised for his "pillar work". Toast's copycat is assassinated by U.S. government agents.
14	2	"Beauty Calls"	Michael Cumming	Arthur Mathews and Matt Berry	25 November 2015
Ed is dating former beauty queen Penvelope – – and Toast hooks up with her friend Clancy Moped. However, their romances are jeopardised when the guys are invited to judge a politically incorrect beauty contest, coincidentally the same one that their respective fathers had previously judged in 1972. Peter Davison and his obnoxious girlfriend have moved in with Ed and Toast, causing much annoyance with his horrible homebrew wine and refusal to do the washing-up. The boys at Scramble Studios sabotage a date between Toast and Clancy by forcing him to work late. Toast and a reluctant Ed go to judge the beauty contest, which is held in a barn in the middle of nowhere. Toast decides to leave, but before he can, feminists (including Clancy and Penvelope) invade the beauty contest. Toast and Ed are dumped, and the story is printed with the same headline as for their fathers. Toast finds that Davison and his girlfriend have accidentally poisoned themselves with homebrew wine, so he and Ed have to do the washing-up themselves.
15	3	"Hamm on Toast"	Michael Cumming	Arthur Mathews and Matt Berry	2 December 2015
Mad Men star Jon Hamm is visiting London and Jane offers to introduce Toast to him. Toast is unimpressed by rumours of Hamm's legendary charisma. Toast's father (Brian Blessed) is dying and Blair wants Toast to help him ensure that they get all the inheritance, then divide it between them. Toast agrees but then suffers a head injury, which causes him to become obsessed with Hamm. Meanwhile he repeatedly brushes off an attractive female fan due to his obsession with Hamm. He takes Hamm with him to see his father, who leaves everything to Hamm. Enraged, Blair throws Toast down 200 stairs, which cures his head injury and returns him to normal.
16	4	"Bob a Job"	Michael Cumming	Arthur Mathews and Matt Berry	9 December 2015
Toast and Purchase perform the "sand dance" at Royal Variety Performance, hosted by Bob Monkhouse. Toast only agrees to perform because Kevin Spacey will be watching and may cast him in House of Cards. Toast is put in charge of getting a gift for Prince Charles. Mrs Purchase has a new job as a drone operative in Afghanistan. Danny plans to have sex reassignment surgery and Toast finds him a discount option, but Danny backs out at the last minute. Toast keeps the fake breasts intended for the surgery to give to Tom Jones, but forgets about the present for Charles. When it turns out he has no present for Charles other than the fake breasts, Monkhouse attempts to defuse the situation with a joke, but Toast pulls a trap door, killing Monkhouse. Spacey has gone missing in action in Afghanistan (presumably accidentally killed by Toast and Mrs Purchase) so Toast's performance in the Royal Variety Performance was for nothing.
17	5	"Man of Sex"	Michael Cumming	Arthur Mathews and Matt Berry	16 December 2015
When appearing in a play called "Man of Sex", Toast's co-star is taken to rehab. Replacing him is Bill Purchase, the albino twin brother of Ray Purchase. Meanwhile, Toast has a new relationship with a "doctor of drumming", but he starts to find her incessant drumming very irritating. Bill plays a number of cruel and disgusting practical jokes on Toast, leading to him collapsing whilst performing on stage. His girlfriend performs CPR using her drumming expertise, but Toast dumps her.
18	6	"Global Warming"	Michael Cumming	Arthur Mathews and Matt Berry	23 December 2015
Toast is set to appear in a production of Twelfth Night at the Globe Theatre. He thinks that he will gain recognition by acting there, but is ridiculed because he will be in a cast consisting mostly of dogs. Angry about the play, he shouts at a foreign tourist and attracts the attention of the "PC Police", who then follow him to a café where he complains about a breastfeeding woman, and a porn theatre, which he leaves after discovering that the film stars Ed. Before the first performance at the Globe, the director realises that the play is a disaster so he and Toast burn down the theatre with a pipe before the performance is due to take place. Although officially it is blamed on Ed's lodger, everyone knows it was Toast and Jane fires him. Toast is forced to perform in pornographic films with Ed.

=== COVID-19 Specials (2021) ===
During the COVID-19 pandemic, a new YouTube channel with new audio skits of Toast of London was created, while in 2021 the "Toast in America" series was confirmed as a six-part television project for the BBC, under the title Toast of Tinseltown. The series debuted on BBC Two on 4 January 2022 with all episodes of Toast of Tinseltown uploaded to the BBC iPlayer at the same time, alongside the three series of Toast of London.

=== Series 4: Toast of Tinseltown (2022) ===
No. overall	No. in series	Title	Directed by	Written by	Original release date
19	1	"Anger Man"	Michael Cumming	Arthur Mathews and Matt Berry	4 January 2022
Toast is being considered for a role in America, but the part is given to Ray Purchase. Toast has anger issues, so he attends a course on anger management given by Des Wigwam. Toast visits the Colonial Club to apologise to his friends, but they only attended because he owes them money. Toast apologises to Ray Purchase for sleeping with his wife, enraging Purchase, and Toast pushes Purchase out of a window. Purchase breaks his legs and Toast gets the part. He flies to Hollywood.
20	2	"LA Story"	Michael Cumming	Arthur Mathews and Matt Berry	11 January 2022
Toast is staying with Russ Nightlife in Hollywood. Toast is being considered for a role in a movie with Daniel Day-Lewis. When Day-Lewis surprises Toast at a party, Toast bites off Day-Lewis's ear. Day-Lewis retires from acting and the film is cancelled.
21	3	"The Scorecard"	Michael Cumming	Arthur Mathews and Matt Berry	18 January 2022
Toast attends a voice-over studio and is dismayed to find Danny Bear and Clem Fandango working there, on exchange from London. Toast has sex with Shepherd Jerbil, a clinical sexologist who ranks her partners on scorecards. Toast is unable to remember his line in a movie, ruining an expensive shot. Russ Nightlife's housekeeper posts the director's low sexual scorecard online using Toast's account. In retaliation, the director publishes Toast's low scorecard on a billboard and in a magazine.
22	4	"Doctor Grainger"	Michael Cumming	Arthur Mathews and Matt Berry	25 January 2022
Toast attends an acting class on playing doctors and is a natural. To make more money for his rent, he decides to try being cast in a medical drama, the producer and director of which are horrible people who pretend to be very friendly. The villain of the show is played by Carmen, an obnoxious singer and diva who embraces the role by being rude to people on the street. Dr. Grainger, Toast's character is loved by the viewers and he gets fan mail, and is signed off for 2 seasons. Toast is asked to visit a couple's sick mother - supposedly a fan - but it turns out the couple are tired of their sick relative and wanted him to turn off her life support system. Toast refuses and flees the hospital, but is accused of murder later. While proven innocent, the producers think this reflects badly on their show. Toast asks for a pay-rise but instead his character is killed off and he is written out of the series.
23	5	"Death Valley"	Michael Cumming	Arthur Mathews and Matt Berry	1 February 2022
Toast is cast in a Western but his trailer is abandoned in Death Valley. As he is wandering the desert, he is captured by a Manson-like madman called Barney, and his cult of crazy hippie girlfriends, and forced to sign a contract that he will look for a specific rattlesnake for him, and is given a goldfish to deliver. He stumbles into an old west tavern, and is given directions by a prospector and a prostitute. Meeting Rusty, he gives him the goldfish which he needed for a miniature Dolphin World set, but since he ran out of food, they are forced to eat the goldfish. As Toast is taking a dump outside he is faced with a giant sidewinder rattlesnake, which bites and kills Rusty but Toast manages to capture it. He is then attacked by a tiger that bites his hand off. He gets help back at the tavern by the prostitute who gives him a freezer for his arm and a cart. He delivers the snake to Barney but the snake died and dried out on the way. As the hippies try to shoot him, local cops arrive and arrest Toast for ambushing a film crew, while the hippies have mysteriously disappeared.
24	6	"Monster Mash"	Michael Cumming	Arthur Mathews and Matt Berry	8 February 2022
Toast is starring in the new Star Wars movie, but his scene keeps being delayed. He keeps getting kidnapped by two inept criminals (one having dentures like Jaws from James Bond and the other dressed as Mike Nesmith from The Monkees television show) but they throw him out of their truck when they realize it is not whom they wanted. When Russ Nightlife gets even more paranoid than usual after one of his old friends died "mysteriously" at the age of 85, Toast accidentally discovers a trunk full of money, a parachute and a gun in his wardrobe, and realizes he is actually D. B. Cooper. Milly is revealed to be an FBI agent and she arrests Russ. Toast visits a wine shop owned by Orson Welles and gets drunk during wine-tasting, but then gets called for his scene. It turns out Ray Purchase is starring in the film and Toast is just doing a voice-over for an animatronic villain. Toast is still drunk so he doesn't get to meet the Queen who was visiting the set to meet a British actor. At the end of the episode, Toast is kidnapped again in error by the two criminals, and one decides to get rid of him but the screen freezes as he aims his gun at him.

== Music and songs ==
The theme music, "Take My Hand" was composed by Matt Berry and was released on the album Witchazel. Each episode of Toast of London also features a novelty song sung by Berry's character Toast, and others. The songs are sometimes sung partly to the fourth wall.

Toast of Tinseltown employed a new end theme, a cover version of Swedish pop singer Doris' "Beatmaker" performed by Matt Berry and Emma Noble.

== Reception ==
On Rotten Tomatoes, the show has an approval rating of 84% to 90% based on 10 reviews, with an average rating of 8/10.

=== Awards ===
At the 61st Rose d'Or awards in 2022, Toast of Tinseltown was named as the best comedy.

At the 2015 BAFTA Awards Matt Berry received the award for Male performance in a comedy programme.

== Book ==
In 2015, Matt Berry and Arthur Mathews published Toast on Toast: Cautionary Tales and Candid Advice, a spoof autobiography of Steven Toast. It was also released as an audio book read by Matt Berry.
