= Kill the Wolf (Matt Berry album) =

Studio album by Matt Berry
- Released: 16 July 2013
- Recorded: 2011−2013
- Genre: Folk rock; psychedelic pop; psychedelic folk
- Length: 45:26
- Label: Acid Jazz Records

Matt Berry chronology
Witchazel (2011)	Kill the Wolf (2013)	Matt Berry and The Maypoles Live (2015)

Singles from Kill the Wolf
- 1. "The Signs" Released: June 17, 2013; 2. "Medicine" Released: June 24, 2013

Professional ratings
Aggregate scores
Source	Rating
Metacritic	71/100
Review scores
Source	Rating
Classic Rock	3.5/5 stars
Mojo	4/5 stars
NME	2.5/5 stars
The Quietus	4/5 stars
Record Collector	3/5 stars
Uncut	3.5/5 stars

Kill the Wolf is the fourth studio album from English comedian and musician Matt Berry. It was released in July 2013 by Acid Jazz Records.

== Track listing ==
All tracks are written by Matt Berry, unless noted.

No.	Title	Writer(s)	Length
1.	"Gather Up"		2:19
2.	"Devil Inside Me"		3:04
3.	"Fallen Angel"		3:05
4.	"Medicine"		3:04
5.	"Wolf Quartet"	Cecilia Fage	0:59
6.	"Solstice"		9:26
7.	"October Sun"		5:24
8.	"The Signs"		2:50
9.	"Knock Knock"		4:09
10.	"Bonfire"		4:28
11.	"Village Dance"		3:20
12.	"Farewell Summer Sun"		3:18
