= Television Themes =

Studio album by Matt Berry
- Released: 5 October 2018
- Recorded: 2017–2018
- Genres: Baroque pop; electronic
- Label: Acid Jazz Records

Matt Berry chronology
Night Terrors (2017)	Television Themes (2018)	Phantom Birds (2020)

Professional ratings
Review scores
Source	Rating
The Times	4/5 stars

Television Themes is the seventh studio album by English comedian and musician Matt Berry, released in October 2018 by Acid Jazz Records. The album includes Berry's reworked versions of television theme tunes from the 1960s to the 1980s. It reached number 38 in the UK Albums Chart.

== Track listing ==
Side A
No.	Title	Writer(s)	Length
1.	"Are You Being Served?"	David Croft, Ronnie Hazlehurst	2:23
2.	"The Good Life"	Burt Rhodes	2:06
3.	"London Weekend Television"	Harry Rabinowitz	0:08
4.	"Blankety Blank"	Ronnie Hazlehurst	1:59
5.	"Top of the Pops" ("Yellow Pearl" by Phil Lynott)	Phil Lynott, Midge Ure	3:06
6.	"Picture Box"	Jacques Lasry	2:57
7.	"The Liver Birds" ("On a Mountain Stands a Lady" by The Scaffold)	John Gorman, Roger McGough, Mike McGear	3:09

Side B
No.	Title	Writer(s)	Length
8.	"Thames Television" (Salute to Thames)	John Hawksworth	0:08
9.	"Rainbow"	Traditional, arranged by Hugh Portnow, Hugh Fraser, Tim Thomas	2:47
10.	"Doctor Who"	Ron Grainer	3:19
11.	"Wildtrak (Note: The television programme was actually called Wildtrack.)" (Florida Fantasy from the soundtrack of Midnight Cowboy)	John Barry	2:15
12.	"World in Action"	Jonathan Weston, Shawn Phillips	2:43
13.	"Sorry"	Gaynor Colbourn, Hugh Wisdom	2:43
14.	"Open University"	Leonard Salzedo	0:37
