= Declan Burke =

UK-based Irish musician

- Born: Dec Burke; 1972 (age 53–54); Limerick, Ireland
- Genres: Rock music
- Instruments: Guitar, keyboards
- Formerly of: Frost*

Declan Burke (born 1972), known professionally as Dec Burke, is an Irish guitarist, keyboardist and vocalist.

== Career ==
Burke began as a keyboard player, before moving to guitar.

With Frost*, Burke played guitar and performed as a vocalist. He contributed to their 2008 album Experiments in Mass Appeal and their 2010 live album The Philadelphia Experiment. He also performed with Darwin's Radio as guitarist / vocalist, recording two albums; 2006's Eyes of the World and 2009's Template for a Generation. Prior to Darwin's Radio, he played in a Rush tribute band called The Spirit of Rush.

In 2010 he released his first solo production, the pop-prog album Destroy All Monsters. It received a 6/10 review in Classic Rock magazine, and a 2.5* review by Melodic.net. Burke released his second solo album, "Paradigms & Storylines", in 2012, which received an 8/10 review in Powermetal.de. Third solo album, Book of Secrets, was released in 2016 to positive reception from Prog magazine. His fourth album released in 2021, Life in Two Dimensions, was described by Grant Moon writing for Prog as his "strongest solo album to date".

He formed a trio, known as AudioPlastik, which released In the Head of a Maniac in 2015.

In 2015, he joined the Dutch prog band Dilemma during the recordings of their second album Random Acts of Liberation.

== Discography ==
=== Darwin's Radio ===
- Eyes of the World (2006)
- Template for a Generation (2009)

=== Frost* ===
- Experiments in Mass Appeal (2008)
- The Philadelphia Experiment (2010)

=== Audioplastik ===
- In the Head of a Maniac (2015)

=== Dilemma ===
- Random Acts of Liberation (2019)

=== Dec Burke ===
- Destroy All Monsters (2010; ProgRock Records)
- Paradigms & Storylines (2011; Ritual Echo Records)
- Book of Secrets (2016; Festival Music)
- Life in Two Dimensions (2021; Gravity Dream Music)
