= Matt Berry =

English actor and musician (born 1974)

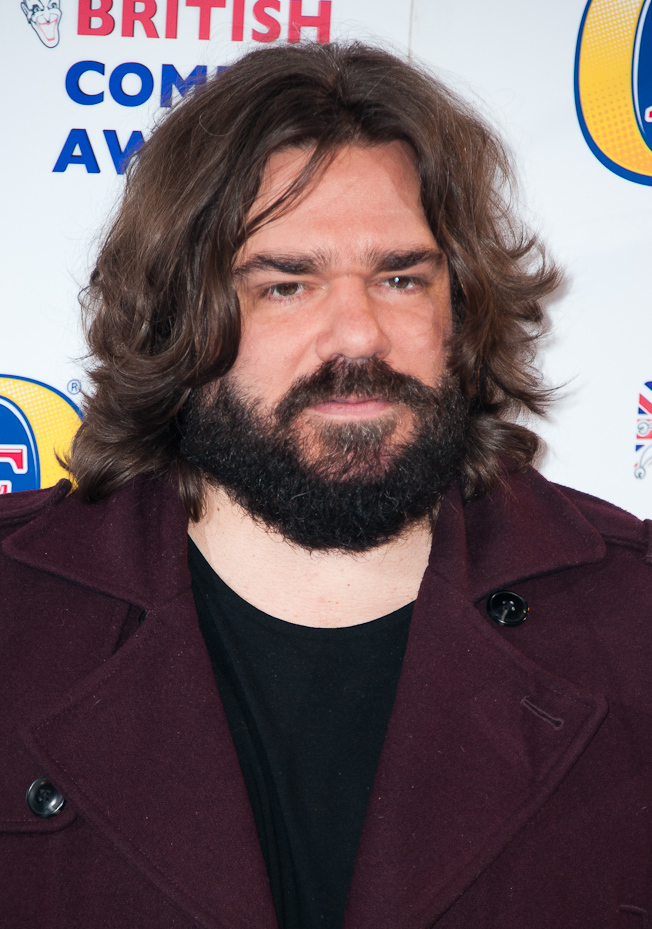
- Berry in 2013
- Born: Matthew Charles Berry; 2 May 1974 (age 52); Bromham, Bedfordshire, England
- Occupations: Actor; comedian; musician; writer
- Years active: 1998–present

Matthew Charles Berry (born 2 May 1974) is an English actor, comedian, musician, and writer. Noted for his distinctive voice and theatrical delivery, he is best known for his television roles in comedy series such as The IT Crowd, Garth Marenghi's Darkplace, The Mighty Boosh, Snuff Box, What We Do in the Shadows, Moominvalley, and Toast of London, the last of which he also co-created and scored (in addition to Snuff Box).

For Toast of London, Berry won one BAFTA Award for Best Male Performance in a Comedy Programme. For What We Do in the Shadows, he was nominated for one Primetime Emmy Award for Outstanding Lead Actor in a Comedy Series and two Critics' Choice Television Awards for Best Actor in a Comedy Series. He has also released 11 studio albums, which are mostly described as psychedelic and folk music.

== Early life and education ==
Matthew Charles Berry was born on 2 May 1974 in Bromham, Bedfordshire, the son of nurse Pauline (née Acreman) and taxi driver Charles Berry.

He was passionate about music in school, but was discouraged from pursuing it by his teachers and disallowed to take it as a GCSE due to the fact that he could not read sheet music. In 1999, he graduated from Nottingham Trent University with a BA in contemporary arts.

His first job was playing Jack the Ripper and a judge at the London Dungeon for £178 a week, up until the release of Garth Marenghi's Darkplace.

== Career ==
=== Film and television ===
Between 1998 and 1999, Berry appeared in the video game magazine show Game Over on BSkyB's computer and technology channel .tv.

Berry appeared in a UK television commercial for Lloyds TSB bank with singer Lionel Richie.

Berry's first prominent television role was Todd Rivers/Lucien Sanchez in the cult 2004 comedy series Garth Marenghi's Darkplace and its 2006 spin-off, Man to Man with Dean Learner. He later appeared as eccentric, sinister tycoon Dixon Bainbridge in The Mighty Boosh. He met the show's Julian Barratt and Noel Fielding while performing at the Hen and Chickens Theatre, where they were resident in 2000. He can be seen in a cameo performance in The Mighty Boosh Live DVD.

After meeting Rich Fulcher while filming The Mighty Boosh, Berry co-created, co-wrote, and co-starred in the comedy series Snuff Box with him on BBC Three; Berry also composed the main theme song and score for the series. Fulcher had co-starred as Bainbridge's lackey Bob Fossil in The Mighty Boosh. Berry also starred with Fulcher and Simon Farnaby on E4's The Golf War in November 2007.

In 2007, Berry joined The IT Crowd during its second series as Douglas Reynholm. He was nominated as Best Male Comedy Newcomer in the 2007 British Comedy Awards for the role.

In 2008, he became the face of Adult Swim's spoof charity appeal "Save the Workers".

In 2010, Berry played journalist Michael Duffy in the BBC production Five Daughters, about events surrounding the Ipswich murders of 2006. In 2011, he provided the voice of Allen in the Aqua Teen Hunger Force episode "Allen Part Two". He appeared in the British comedy panel game Shooting Stars, portraying Vangelis. He appeared as an antiques expert in the ITV sketch show Monkey Trousers with Vic and Bob and Steve Coogan.

Berry appeared in a number of films during this period, including The Devil's Chair (2006) and Moon (2009). He starred in The Search (2009), a short film about "a lonely man's search for the existence of life outside our universe takes a remarkable turn when he connects with a recently bereaved family".

In 2012, BBC Radio 4 aired his comedy series I, Regress, where he portrayed Dr. Berry, a brilliant but unorthodox regressive therapist. In each 15-minute episode, Berry explored the psyche of a guest patient, attempting to treat their problems in surreal dreamlike sequences. Berry appeared in the film adaptation of the David Nicholls novel One Day as Aaron, Dexter's agent. He was briefly featured in the closing ceremony of the 2012 Summer Olympics in London, introducing ELO's "Mr. Blue Sky" by way of a mock weather forecast.

In July 2012, he appeared as vainglorious actor Steven Toast in the pilot episode of Channel 4 sitcom Toast of London, co-written with Arthur Mathews. Notwithstanding mixed reviews, a series was commissioned, and the first episode was broadcast on 20 October 2013, and it brought Berry the 2015 BAFTA Award for Best Male Comedy Performance. In 2015, Berry and Arthur Mathews published Toast on Toast: Cautionary Tales and Candid Advice, a spoof autobiography of Steven Toast. It was released as an audiobook read by Berry.

Berry played the title character in the 2013 Portlandia episode "Squiggleman". Co-creators Fred Armisen and Carrie Brownstein included the appearance on a list of their "proudest musical moments" from the show.

From 2014 to 2015, Berry co-starred in the BBC Two series House of Fools, written by and starring Reeves and Mortimer. He portrayed Beef, "the highly sexual, flamboyant and blindly confident friend of Vic and Bob" who "will seduce anything in a skirt".

Berry appeared in episode nine of the sixth season of Dan Harmon's television series Community, released on Yahoo Screen on 5 May 2015. In December 2015, he played Professor Awfulshirt in Harry Hill in Professor Branestawm Returns on BBC One.

From 2019 until 2024, Berry starred in the FX TV adaptation of the film What We Do in the Shadows as Laszlo, one of four vampires living in Staten Island. In an interview with collider.com, Berry said, "It's different and it's very free. The scripts are starting points and then we go from there. That's how I like to work, anyway. So, for me, it was perfect. That's my background, improvisation. It was home for me in that department."

In 2019, Berry starred in the IFC/Channel 4 sitcom Year of the Rabbit. Set in Victorian London, he plays the alcoholic Detective Inspector Rabbit. On 11 February 2020, the series was renewed for a second series of six episodes. Citing budget cuts caused by the COVID-19 pandemic, Channel 4 reversed their decision in January 2021, casting doubt on the show's future. Layla Smith, chief executive of the show's production company OMG, said "Year of the Rabbit is a victim of the devastating effects of COVID. [...] IFC are very committed to the show, but we will need to find another partner — and we're working on that."

In April 2020, BBC Two commissioned Berry for a mockumentary series titled Squeamish About ... The four quarter-hour specials would be cowritten by Berry and Arthur Mathews and star Berry as Michael Squeamish. The series uses a combination of archive footage and voiceover to produce a surreal perspective on the episodes' subject.

In 2021, after the second series of Year of the Rabbit was axed, Berry was commissioned by the BBC to make a "Steven Toast in America" series. The show was a six-part television programme for BBC One, broadcast under the title Toast of Tinseltown and co-written by Berry and Arthur Mathews.

In March 2026, Berry was the announcer for the 98th Academy Awards.

=== Voice acting ===
Berry voiced Bubbles, an inter-dimensional dolphin, in the 2015 SpongeBob SquarePants film sequel, The SpongeBob Movie: Sponge Out of Water. That year, he also voiced the main villainess, The Butt Witch, in Twelve Forever, a series pilot created by Julia Vickerman for Cartoon Network that was released on its website on 18 May 2015. The show was moved to Netflix in December 2017. From 2015 to 2016, Berry narrated Matt Berry Does ..., a series of comedy shorts for the BBC. He provided the voice of Prince Merkimer in Matt Groening's animated series Disenchantment, which premiered in 2018 on Netflix. Berry's distinctive voice has seen him providing many voiceovers for both radio and television advertising, including for Volvic (as the voice of George the Volcano), The Natural Confectionery Company (voicing various characters alongside Rupert Degas), Fridge Raiders, and Moneysupermarket.com. He has been in the sketch show The Wrong Door as a recurring bit-part character who runs into a snooker hall and shouts "stop playing snooker!" before whispering an implied impossible wager to one of the players and completing an infeasible trick shot. In 2012, he worked with Team17 on their video game title Worms Revolution, providing voiceover, as fictional wildlife documentary maker Don Keystone, for both the game and the video advertisements produced for it.

In 2014, Berry read out the team sheets at Kenilworth Road before Luton Town matches. In 2015, he provided the voice for a satirical anti-war film by the UK branch of Veterans for Peace called Action Man: Battlefield Casualties. In 2019, he provided the voice of Moominpappa in the Finnish animated children's series Moominvalley. He provided the voice for the torture droid 8D8 in the 2021 Star Wars television series The Book of Boba Fett.

In 2023, Berry narrated a short segment in an episode of Last Week Tonight with John Oliver about freight trains titled 'The Sad Tale of Henry the Engine', a spoof of the Thomas & Friends television series. In 2024, he voiced Chester Arborday in the season 35 episode of The Simpsons, "Lisa Gets an F1". In 2025, he provided the human voice of Nitwit in A Minecraft Movie.

In 2026, he voices Kallax Storageborn, a Bethesda Creation Club mod for The Elder Scrolls: Skyrim, made in collaboration with IKEA.

=== Music ===
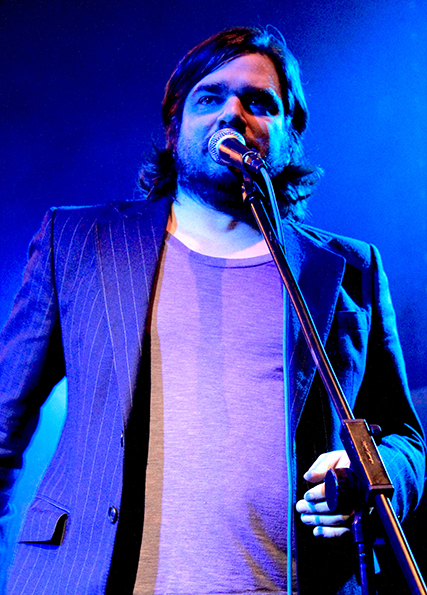
Berry performing in 2013

Berry composed all the music for Snuff Box and Toast of London, as well as the music for AD/BC: A Rock Opera, which he co-wrote with Richard Ayoade. AD/BC was a half-hour parody of overblown musicals in general and Jesus Christ Superstar in particular, telling the story of the innkeeper who allowed Mary, Joseph and the baby Jesus to sleep in his stable. AD/BC was broadcast in December 2004 and featured Fulcher and Mighty Boosh stars Julian Barratt and Noel Fielding. Berry performed a song for an episode of Garth Marenghi's Darkplace, "One Track Lover", a spoof of cheesy romantic 1980s songs.

Berry wrote music for the BBC 2 Steve Coogan comedy Saxondale and appeared in the first and third episodes of the second series of the show. He composed the theme song for the Channel 4 sketch show Blunder. He is also credited on The Peter Serafinowicz Show.

Berry is friends with musical composer Dan McGrath and contributed to the Strictly Come Dancing theme song by playing guitar and providing the audible "Hey".

Berry has recorded eleven studio albums: Jackpot (1995), Opium (self-released 2008), Witchazel (self-released 2009, re-released 2011), Kill the Wolf (2013), Music for Insomniacs (2014), The Small Hours (2016), Television Themes (2018), Phantom Birds (2020), The Blue Elephant (2021), and Heard Noises (2025). The most recent seven have been released on Eddie Piller's Acid Jazz Records. In 2017, a "companion piece" to The Small Hours was released, Night Terrors, featuring remixes by artists such as Saint Etienne. Berry stated in the first issue of Bearded in 2007 that he was producing and collaborating on new material with 1960s soul singer Geno Washington and would record an album. It was Witchazel, which Berry originally released as a one-day-only free download in March 2009. It was later released as a CD and paid-for digital download.

Berry has toured with a number of bands including Jonas 3 and The Maypoles. The latter comprises former Bluetones singer Mark Morriss and singer/clarinettist Cecilia Fage. Rich Fulcher has joined Berry on stage for several appearances. Geno Washington has joined him onstage at London gigs for encores of the Snuff Box theme.

In October 2007, Berry provided a new track, "Cream Pie", to Bearded for readers to download free, followed by a cover of the Blur song "Sing" in November 2007. "Cream Pie" is still available to supporters of Beardaid.

Until 2010, Berry presented a show on Absolute Radio, where he still performs various voiceovers and was described as "the voice of Absolute Radio".

In 2015, Berry was the opening act for Steven Wilson's second Royal Albert Hall concert.

In July 2018, Berry released the album Television Themes on Acid Jazz Records, featuring covers of famous retro TV themes such as Sorry!, Doctor Who and Rainbow. It became his first UK Top 40 album chart hit.

In 2019, Berry was revealed as one of the contributing artists on The Desert Sessions album Vols. 11 & 12. He co-wrote, narrated, and played the organ on the track "Chic Tweetz".

In October 2020, Berry's album Phantom Birds (also issued by Acid Jazz) made the UK albums chart and eclipsed the number 38 peak of Television Themes by reaching number 31. In December 2020, he appeared in Gorillaz's live-streamed concert Song Machine Live, performing the narration for the spoken-word song "Fire Coming Out of the Monkey's Head" from the album Demon Days. On 14 May 2021, Berry released his ninth studio album The Blue Elephant through Acid Jazz. In 2023, he released his 10th studio album Simplicity. His 11th studio album Heard Noises was released on 24 January 2025 through Acid Jazz.

The song "Take My Hand" from Berry's album Witchazel (2009), which first became known as the opening theme for his comedy series Toast of London (2012–2015), garnered new interest when it was used as the closing credits theme of the Netflix documentary miniseries American Murder: Gabby Petito in February 2025. In the two weeks following the airing of the series, the song was streamed in the U.S. over 579,000 times, representing a 1,505% increase in the song's streaming activity.

As of October 2025, Berry has transferred to Sony Music Publishing for future releases. On 29 October 2025 he made a guest appearance playing the organ for Queens of the Stone Age on their Catacombs Tour at Royal Albert Hall.

==== Music videos ====
Berry starred in the video for the Super Furry Animals song "Run-Away" (2007), directed by Richard Ayoade. Other appearances include the videos for "Reset" (2011) by London-based experimental band Three Trapped Tigers and "What Are You Like" (2017) by Irish band Pugwash.

== Personal life ==
In contrast to the boisterous and unhinged characters he is known for playing, Berry has been noted as shy and introverted; he rarely discusses his private life in interviews and avoids promotional events unless he is contractually obliged to attend them. His social media profiles are dedicated solely to updates on his work. He was seen having dinner and partying in Soho with actress Charlie Brooks in 2016, but the pair did not comment on the tabloid reports and no more updates were given. Berry previously lived in London. In an April 2017 interview with The i Paper he said that he had "moved to somewhere with a bit more space" before asking the interviewer not to name the place in the article.

== Filmography ==
=== Film ===
Key
†	Denotes films that have not yet been released

Year	Title	Role	Notes
2002	One Last Thing	Mugger	Short film
2007	The Devil's Chair	Brett Wilson	
2009	Moon	Overmeyers	
2009	The Search	Bootland	Short film
2009	A Bit of Tom Jones?	Philip da Purve	
2010	Huge	Head Creative	
2010	Braincell	Neil Balsam	
2010	The Pizza Miracle	Daniel	Short film
2011	One Day	Aaron	
2011	Angry White Man	Bulldog Hayes	
2012	Snow White and the Huntsman	Percy	
2012	The Wedding Video	Roger	Composed score
2013	Svengali	Jeremy Braines	
2014	Asterix and Obelix: Mansion of the Gods	Vitalstatistix	English dub
2015	The SpongeBob Movie: Sponge Out of Water	Bubbles the Dolphin	Voice role
2015	Swansong	Toby Taylor	
2017	Sleigh	Martin	Short film
2018	An Evening with Beverly Luff Linn	Rodney von Donkensteiger	
2018	Take Rabbit	Fox / Guard 2	Voice roles; Short film
2018	Christopher Robin	Policeman Bobby	
2020	The SpongeBob Movie: Sponge on the Run	King Poseidon	Voice role
2023	The Inventor	Pope Leo X	Voice role
2024	The Wild Robot	Paddler	Voice role
2025	Bubble & Squeak	Shazbor	
2025	A Minecraft Movie	Nitwit	Voice role
2026	Rogue Trooper	Mr. Bland	Voice role
2026	Ray Gunn	Francis "Slugsy" Xavier	Voice role
2026	The Cat in the Hat	Waffles	Voice role
2027	Sonic the Hedgehog 4 †	TBA	Post-production
2027	A Minecraft Movie Squared †	TBA	Filming

=== Television ===
Year	Title	Role	Notes
2004	Garth Marenghi's Darkplace	Todd Rivers/Dr Lucien Sanchez	6 episodes
2004	The Mighty Boosh	Dixon Bainbridge	4 episodes
2004	AD/BC: A Rock Opera	Innkeeper/Tim Wynde	Television special; also writer and composer
2006	Snuff Box	Matt/Various characters	6 episodes; also co-creator, writer and composer
2006	Man to Man with Dean Learner	Various characters	5 episodes
2006	Saxondale	Geoff	2 episodes; also composer
2007	The Peter Serafinowicz Show	Various characters	2 episodes; also composer
2007–2013	The IT Crowd	Douglas Reynholm	16 episodes
2008	The Wrong Door	Various characters	3 episodes; also writer
2008–2009	The Sarah Silverman Program	Sir Corin Ashley/Owl	2 episodes
2009	Svengali	Jeremy Braines	Television short
2010	The Suits	Voice	Television short
2010	Five Daughters	Mirror Journalist	Episode #1.3
2011	Duckworth	Turk Cinnamon	Pilot
2011	Aqua Teen Hunger Force	Allen (voice)	Episode: "Allen"
2011	Shooting Stars	Vangelis	Episode #8.3
2012	Loserville	Hotelier	Television special
2012–2015	Toast of London	Steven Toast	19 episodes; also co-creator, writer and composer
2013	Portlandia	Squiggleman	Episode: "Squiggleman"
2013	It's Kevin	Sex Pistol	Episode #1.3
2014	Lucas Bros. Moving Co.	OG Sherlock Kush (voice)	Episode: "Tales from the Hoodie"
2014–2015	House of Fools	Beef	13 episodes
2015	Community	Professor Roger DeSalvo	Episode: "Grifting 101"
2015	Major Lazer	Professor Teacher (voice)	2 episodes
2015	Matt Berry Does....	Narrator	6 Shorts (5 broadcast)
2015	Randy Cunningham: 9th Grade Ninja	Brawn Brickwall (voice)	Episode: "The Brawn Also Rises"
2015	Harvey Beaks	Doctor Roberts (voice)	2 episodes
2016	Morgana Robinson's The Agency	Tony	Episode #1.3
2016	The Last Dragonslayer	King Snodd	Television film
2016	Professor Branestawm Returns	Professor Awfulshirt	Television film
2018–2023	Disenchantment	Prince Merkimer (voice)	13 episodes
2019	Year of the Rabbit	Detective Inspector Rabbit	6 episodes
2019	Archer	Mr. Deadly (voice)	Episode: "Archer: 1999 -- Mr. Deadly Goes to Town"
2019	Twelve Forever	Butt Witch (voice)	9 episodes
2019	The Road to Brexit	Michael Squeamish	Television special
2019–2024	Moominvalley	Moominpappa (voice)	26 episodes
2019–2024	What We Do in the Shadows	Leslie "Laszlo" Cravensworth	Main cast
2020	Squeamish About	Michael Squeamish (voice)	4 episodes; also writer
2021	The Watch	Gawain (voice)	5 episodes
2021–2022	The Book of Boba Fett	8D8 (voice)	5 episodes
2022	Toast of Tinseltown	Steven Toast	6 episodes; also co-creator and writer
2023	Great Expectations	Mr. Pumblechuck	Miniseries
2023	Last Week Tonight with John Oliver	The Sad Tale of Henry the Engine narrator	Episode: "Freight Trains"
2023–present	Krapopolis	Shlub, Paizo (voices)	Main role
2024	The Simpsons	Chester Arborday (voice)	Episode: "Lisa Gets an F1"
2024	Curb Your Enthusiasm	Les McCrabb	Episode: "Ken/Kendra"
2024	Fallout	Snip Snip (voice)	Episode: "The Ghouls"
2024	Fallout	Mr. Handy/Sebastian Leslie	Episode: "The Trap"
2025	Watson	Sherlock Holmes (voice)	Episode: "Teeth Marks"
2026	98th Academy Awards	Announcer	Television special
2026	Citadel	Frank Sharpe	6 episodes
TBA	Force & Majeure	Thomas Force	

=== Video games ===
Year	Title	Role	Notes
2012	Worms Revolution	Don Keystone (Dictor)	
2024	Thank Goodness You're Here!	Herbert	
2026	Lego Batman: Legacy of the Dark Knight	Bane	
2026	The Elder Scrolls V: Skyrim x IKEA	Kallax Storageborn	

=== Audio ===
Year	Title	Role	Notes
2026	Harry Potter: The Full-Cast Audio Editions	Sir Cadogan	

== Discography ==
Albums
Year	Title	Label	Notes	UK Albums Chart
1995	Jackpot	Self-released		—
2005	Opium	Self-released	Re-released on Acid Jazz Records in 2015	—
2009	Witchazel	Acid Jazz Records	Re-released on Acid Jazz Records in 2011	—
2013	Kill the Wolf	Acid Jazz Records		—
2014	Music for Insomniacs	Acid Jazz Records		—
2015	Matt Berry and the Maypoles Live	Acid Jazz Records	First live album	—
2016	The Small Hours	Acid Jazz Records		—
2017	Night Terrors	Acid Jazz Records	Companion piece to The Small Hours	—
2018	Television Themes	Acid Jazz Records		38
2020	Phantom Birds	Acid Jazz Records		31
2021	The Blue Elephant	Acid Jazz Records		46
2023	Simplicity	Acid Jazz Records, KPM Music		—
2025	Heard Noises	Acid Jazz Records		22
2026	Everything's Peachy	Acid Jazz Records	As Matt Berry Trio, with Phil Scragg and Graham Mann	—
"—" denotes releases that did not chart.

== Awards and nominations ==
Year	Award/Event	Category	Work	Result	Ref.
2007	British Comedy Awards	Best Male Comedy Newcomer	The IT Crowd	Nominated	
2015	BAFTA TV Awards	Best Male Performance in a Comedy Programme	Toast of London	Won	
2015	BAFTA TV Craft Awards	Best Writer: Comedy	Toast of London	Nominated	
2021	Critics' Choice Television Awards	Best Actor in a Comedy Series	What We Do in the Shadows	Nominated	
2022	Astra TV Awards	Best Actor in a Broadcast Network or Cable Series, Comedy	What We Do in the Shadows	Nominated	
2023	BAFTA TV Awards	Best Male Performance in a Comedy Programme	What We Do in the Shadows	Nominated	
2023	Critics' Choice Super Awards	Best Actor in a Horror Series, Limited Series or Made-for-TV Movie	What We Do in the Shadows	Nominated	
2023	Critics' Choice Television Awards	Best Actor in a Comedy Series	What We Do in the Shadows	Nominated	
2024	Astra TV Awards	Best Actor in a Broadcast Network or Cable Series, Comedy	What We Do in the Shadows	Nominated	
2024	Primetime Emmy Awards	Outstanding Lead Actor in a Comedy Series	What We Do in the Shadows	Nominated	
2024	Golden Joystick Awards	Best Supporting Performer	Thank Goodness You're Here!	Nominated	
2025	British Academy Games Awards	Performer in a Supporting Role	Thank Goodness You're Here!	Nominated	
