= Nathan King (musician) =

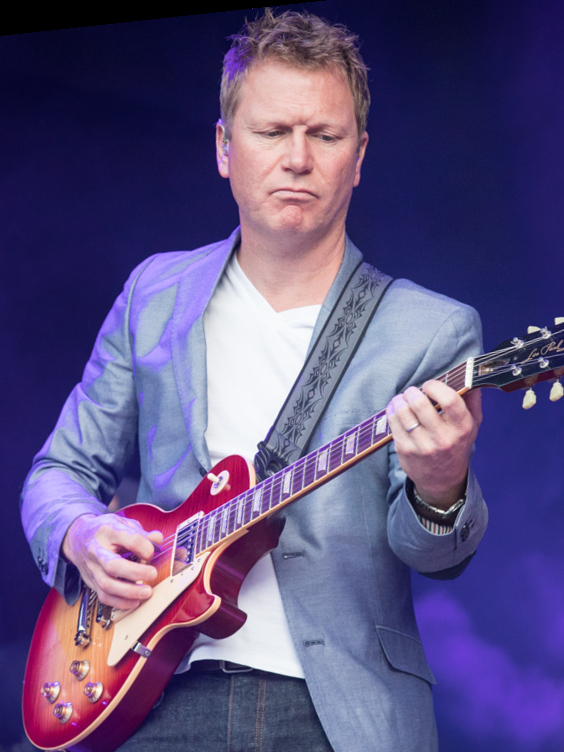
- King performing with Level 42 in 2017

Background information
- Born: 29 August 1970 (age 55); Isle of Wight, England
- Origin: London, England
- Genres: Rock; jazz-funk; pop; soul; progressive rock
- Instruments: Guitar; bass; vocals
- Years active: 1994–present
- Member of: Level 42; Frost*; The Blockheads
- Formerly of: It Bites

Nathan King (born 29 August 1970) is an English musician. Currently a member of Level 42 and The Blockheads, King has also performed with Frost* and It Bites. He is the younger brother of the Level 42 lead vocalist Mark King.

King is also a contributor to the "All About the Bass" series on the Andertons TV YouTube channel.
