= Eat Me in St. Louis =

Studio album by It Bites
- Released: June 1989
- Recorded: January–February 1989
- Studio: Musicland Studios, Munich
- Genre: Progressive rock
- Label: Virgin (UK), Geffen (US)
- Producer: Reinhold Mack, It Bites

It Bites chronology
| Once Around the World (1988) | Eat Me in St. Louis (1989) | The Tall Ships (2008) |

Singles from Eat Me in St. Louis
- 1. "Still Too Young to Remember" Released: May 1989; 2. "Sister Sarah" Released: July 1989; 3. "Underneath Your Pillow" Released: October 1989

Eat Me in St. Louis is the third album by British progressive pop/rock band It Bites. The album title was also reused for a compilation album by the band, aimed at the US market.

== The original Eat Me in St Louis ==
Eat Me in St. Louis saw It Bites move away from the progressive rock and pop influences of their two previous albums and towards a more hard rock sound with more straightforward compositions and a heavier, rawer sound. The album was recorded in Munich and produced by Reinhold Mack, best known for his work with Queen.

The band enlisted Roger Dean (the record sleeve artist famous for his fantasy-based cover art on Yes albums) to produce the artwork for Eat Me in St. Louis. The album yielded three singles - "Still Too Young to Remember", "Underneath Your Pillow" and "Sister Sarah". The first two of these were also re-released as remixed versions. None of the singles were significant hits, though all five made it into the UK charts, with the remixed versions performing slightly better than the originals.

This was the only It Bites album to feature the Tapboard, a tap-style guitar instrument developed by lead singer/guitarist Francis Dunnery and Dave Farmilow. Dunnery used the Tapboard on the coda to "Leaving Without You" and on the album's concluding instrumental, "Charlie" (which did not appear on the LP release). Early CD copies of the album came with a bonus 3-inch CD single which featured three extra tracks: "Having a Good Day", "Reprise" and "Bullet in the Barrel". The first two of these tracks showcased the Tapboard ("Having a Good Day" featured it in a band context, and "Reprise" in a fast minimalist instrumental played predominantly by Dunnery).

Eat Me in St. Louis was the final studio album by the original lineup of It Bites, as Francis Dunnery left the band the following year. Although It Bites recruited a new singer, Lee Knott, and continued for a further year (with erstwhile keyboard player John Beck now playing guitar) the band changed both its direction and its name (first to Navajo Kiss and then to Sister Sarah) and did not record any further material. The band would not record again until reuniting in 2006 with a new lead singer and guitarist, John Mitchell.

== The American compilation album ==
The original version of Eat Me in St. Louis was not released in the United States. Instead, the title was reused for a compilation album collecting together tracks from all three of It Bites' studio albums. This included all three singles from Eat Me in St. Louis (plus album opener "Positively Animal", "The Ice Melts into Water" and "Murder of the Planet Earth") plus two singles each from Once Around the World and The Big Lad in the Windmill (including the band's biggest hit, "Calling All the Heroes").

== Track listing ==
=== Original album ===
1. "Positively Animal" (4:33)
2. "Underneath Your Pillow" (5:25)
3. "Let Us All Go" (4:08)
4. "Still Too Young to Remember" (4:57)
5. "Murder of the Planet Earth" (3:47)
6. "People of America" (4:13)
7. "Sister Sarah" (4:17)
8. "Leaving Without You" (4:52)
9. "Till the End of Time" (4:11) (CD/cassette only)
10. "The Ice Melts into Water" (7:13)
11. "Charlie" (7:35) (CD/cassette only)

=== Limited-edition bonus CD single (released with early CD versions of the album) ===
1. "Having a Good Day"
2. "Reprise"
3. "Bullet in the Barrel"

=== Japanese CD ===
1. "Sister Sarah" (4:17)
2. "Underneath Your Pillow" (5:25)
3. "Let Us All Go" (4:08)
4. "Still Too Young to Remember" (4:57)
5. "Till the End of Time" (4:11)
6. "Murder of the Planet Earth" (3:47)
7. "Positively Animal" (4:33)
8. "Vampires" (4:42)
9. "Leaving Without You" (4:52)
10. "People of America" (4:13)
11. "The Ice Melts into Water" (7:13)
12. "Charlie" (7:35)

=== American compilation album ===
1. "Calling All The Heroes" (5:33)
2. "All in Red" (3:30)
3. "Kiss Like Judas" (4:08)
4. "Midnight" (4:04)
5. "Positively Animal" (4:33)
6. "Underneath Your Pillow" (5:25)
7. "Sister Sarah" (4:18)
8. "The Ice Melts into Water" (7:12)
9. "Still Too Young to Remember" (4:57)
10. "Murder of the Planet Earth" (3:47)

== Personnel ==
It Bites

- Francis Dunnery - guitars, vocals, Tapboard
- John Beck - keyboards, backing & harmony vocals
- Dick Nolan - bass guitar, backing vocals
- Bob Dalton - drums, backing vocals

Additional personnel

- Stephan Wissnet - studio assistant
- Roger Dean - artwork and design
- Martyn Dean - photography

== Charts ==
| Charts | Peak position |
|---|---|
| UK Albums Chart | 40 |
