= Once Around the World =

Studio album by It Bites
- Released: 21 March 1988
- Recorded: 1986–88
- Studio: Manor Studios, Oxfordshire
- Genre: Progressive rock
- Length: 44:49 (LP version)
- Label: Virgin (UK), Geffen (US)
- Producer: Steve Hillage, It Bites, Mark Wallis

It Bites chronology
The Big Lad in the Windmill (1986)	Once Around the World (1988)	Eat Me in St. Louis (1989)

Singles from Once Around the World
- 1. "Old Man and the Angel" Released: 27 April 1987; 2. "Kiss Like Judas" Released: 1 February 1988; 3. "Midnight" Released: 11 April 1988

Once Around the World is the second album by British progressive pop/rock band It Bites.

Released in 1988, Once Around the World was recorded at Manor Hill Studios in Oxfordshire. The first five of the album's nine tracks (on vinyl or cassette, the first side of the album) were produced by Steve Hillage and mostly feature the more single-driven pop approach preferred by the band's label, Virgin Records. One of these tracks, "Black December", was a re-recorded single b-side. The remaining tracks (including the almost fifteen-minute title track, the band's longest composition) were produced by It Bites with Mark Wallis and showcase their progressive rock influences.

The album produced three singles ("Kiss Like Judas", "Midnight" and a drastic edit of "Old Man and the Angel") and saw the band embark on a tour of the UK, US and Japan. Though both "Kiss Like Judas" and "Old Man and the Angel" charted, they failed to achieve hit status, peaking at number 76 and number 72 respectively, and Once Around the World is the only one of the three album It Bites released during their original run which failed to crack the UK Top 40.

== Reception ==
According to Paul Stump's History of Progressive Rock, the album "would, in another epoch, have been seen as the album that broke [It Bites] as superstars. In 1988, it disappeared without a trace, lacking a suitable single to bolster it à la 'Calling All the Heroes'." He praised the album's combination of catchy melodies and intellectually stimulating rhythmic subtleties.

== Track listing ==
1. "Midnight" (4:04)
2. "Kiss Like Judas" (4:08)
3. "Yellow Christian" (6:29)
4. "Rose Marie" (3:33)
5. "Black December" (3:50)
6. "Old Man and the Angel" (9:21) The UK vinyl release had a shortened version of this track (3:59)
7. "Hunting the Whale" (4:46) CD only
8. "Plastic Dreamer" (3:53)
9. "Once Around the World" (14:46)

== Personnel ==
It Bites

- Francis Dunnery – guitars, lead vocals
- John Beck – keyboards, backing & harmony vocals
- Dick Nolan – bass, backing vocals
- Bob Dalton – drums, backing vocals

Additional personnel

- Mark Wallis – producer, engineer and mixer
- Nick Davis – engineer
- Nick Froome – engineer

== Charts ==
Chart	Peak position
UK Albums Chart	43
