= Frankenstein Monster (album) =

Studio album by Francis Dunnery
- Released: 2013
- Recorded: Summer 2013
- Genre: Rock, Progressive Rock
- Label: Aquarian Nation
- Producer: Francis Dunnery

Francis Dunnery chronology
| Made in Space (2011) | Frankenstein Monster (2013) | Vampires (2016) |

Frankenstein Monster is an album released by songwriter Francis Dunnery, released in 2013, consisting largely of material written and performed by Francis' brother Baz Dunnery, in his band Necromandus. Francis had promised his mother to make an album with his brother before both his mother and Baz died.

It contains a cover of Warm Dust's Blood Of My Fathers, and is rounded off by newer compositions written solely by Francis. The album was supported by a tour of the Sensational Francis Dunnery Electric Band featuring Tony Beard, Jamie Bishop and Mike Cassedy. There is also an ongoing documentary entitled "My Big Brother" which features on Francis' website detailing the making of the album and the stories behind the songs. Much of the build-up to the album revolved around Dunnery's return to playing more electric guitar, having been known by some music fans for his technical Holdsworth-inspired playing in his '80s band It Bites.

The song titles differ from the titles that appear on any of the Necromandus releases, as those titles are thought to have been given by Tony Iommi in order to fit a set theme. These versions restore the original "Cumbrian" song titles.

== Track listing ==
1. "Frankenstein Monster"
2. "Don't Look Down Frank"
3. "Leaving the Depot"
4. "I've Been Evil"
5. "Limpet Man"
6. "Marijuana Make Those Eyes At Me For"
7. "Wum Wop"
8. "Big Fine Lad"
9. "Yam"
10. "Judy Green Rocket"
11. "Christianity"
12. "Blood Of My Fathers"
13. "Ho Ho Your Sandwiches"
14. "Multi Coloured Judy Green"
