= Map of the Past =

Map of The Past

Studio album by It Bites
- Released: March 26, 2012
- Recorded: Outhouse Studios
- Genre: Progressive rock, pop rock
- Length: 52:41 (Normal Version); 69:41 (2CD Version)
- Label: Inside Out
- Producer: It Bites

It Bites chronology
| The Tall Ships (2008) | Map of The Past (2012) |

Professional ratings
Review scores
| Source | Rating |
|---|---|
| AllMusic | 3/5 stars |

Map of the Past is the fifth studio album by progressive rock band It Bites. It was released on March 26, 2012. This is the band's first concept album. It was written by singer/guitarist John Mitchell and keyboardist John Beck throughout 2011. This concept deals with the theme of the past, as seen through old photographs.

== Track listing ==
1. "Man in the Photograph" (3:44)
2. "Wallflower" (4:51)
3. "Map of the Past" (4:37)
4. "Clocks" (5:43)
5. "Flag" (4:38)
6. "The Big Machine" (5:18)
7. "Cartoon Graveyard" (5:03)
8. "Send No Flowers" (4:15)
9. "Meadow and the Stream" (6:42)
10. "The Last Escape" (6:07)
11. "Exit Song" (1:43)

=== Bonus tracks (2021 UK (& EU?) version) ===
1. Lighthouse (3:27)
2. "Come On" (5:10)

Also includes bonus 6-page 'Liner Notes' insert written by John Mitchell in January 2021.

=== Bonus tracks (Japanese special edition) ===
1. "Come On" (5:10)

=== Bonus disc edition ===
1. "Midnight" (live) (5:34) (2CD version)
2. "Bullet in the Barrel" (live) (4:43) (2CD version)
3. "Kiss Like Judas" (live) (6:32) (2CD version)
4. "Once Around The World" (live) (20:25) (2CD version)
5. "This is England" (live) (15:49) (2CD version)
6. "All in Red" (live) (3:57) (2CD version)

== Personnel ==
- John Mitchell - lead vocals, guitars
- John Beck - keyboards, backing & harmony vocals
- Lee Pomeroy - bass guitar
- Bob Dalton - drums, backing vocals

== Charts ==
| Chart (2012) | Peak position |
|---|---|
| UK Albums Chart | 100 |
