= Kino (British band) =

British progressive rock band

- Origin: United Kingdom
- Genres: Neo-prog; progressive rock
- Years active: 2004–2006; 2017–present
- Label: InsideOut
- Members: John Mitchell; Pete Trewavas; John Beck; Craig Blundell
- Past members: Chris Maitland; Bob Dalton

Kino are a British neo-prog band made up of members from other progressive rock acts (John Mitchell from Arena and The Urbane; Pete Trewavas from Marillion, Edison's Children and Transatlantic; John Beck from It Bites; Bob Dalton also from It Bites; Chris Maitland formerly of Porcupine Tree).

The band released their debut album Picture in February 2005.

The band were inactive from 2006–2018 with Mitchell having joined Beck and Dalton in the re-formed It Bites, replacing original singer/guitarist Francis Dunnery, touring in 2006 and releasing 2 albums., and the band no longer appearing on InsideOut music's website.

However, in January 2018, it was announced that Mitchell, Trewavas and Beck had reformed the band with Craig Blundell replacing Chris Maitland on drums. A new studio album 'Radio Voltaire' was released in March 2018.

== Line up ==
=== Current members ===
- John Mitchell – lead and backing vocals, guitars (2004–2006, 2017–present)
- Pete Trewavas – bass, bass pedals, backing and lead vocals (2004–2006, 2017–present)
- John Beck – synthesizers, backing and lead vocals (2004–2006, 2017–present)
- Craig Blundell – drums, percussion (2017–present)

=== Former members ===
- Chris Maitland (Picture Studio Recording) – drums, percussion, backing vocals (2005)
- Bob Dalton – drums, percussion, backing vocals (2006)

== Discography ==
- Picture (studio album, February 2005)
- Cutting Room Floor (compilation, December 2005)
- Radio Voltaire (studio album, March 2018)
