= Frank Hall (drummer) =

English musician and drummer

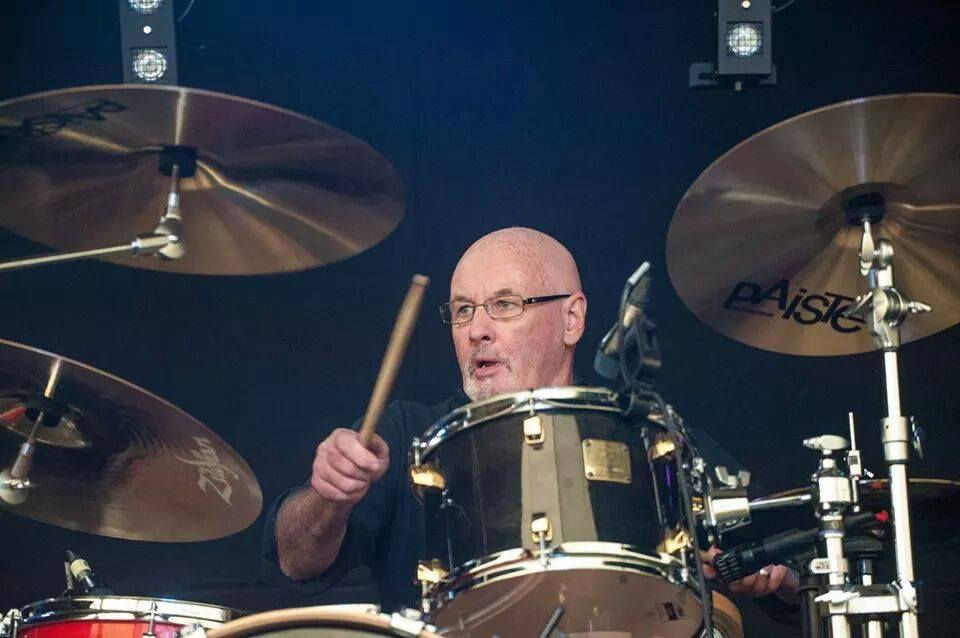

Background information
- Born: 31 October 1949 (age 77); Whitehaven, Cumbria, England
- Occupation: Musician
- Instrument: drums
- Years active: 1965–present

Frank Hall (born 29 October 1949) is an English musician and drummer. He was a founder member of the pioneering 1960s-1970s rock band Necromandus, widely hailed as the second Black Sabbath, and by Melody Maker as "Black Sabbath play Yes". After Necromandus, Hall collaborated with Ozzy Osbourne's first solo project after leaving Black Sabbath.

== Biography ==
Hall was born in Whitehaven in Cumbria. His first project was with the local band, Heaven. But in 1968 he formed Necromandus with fellow musicians from Whitehaven and Egremont. Hall had meant to call the band Nostradamus, but they liked Necromandus, and the name stuck. The band was quickly taken up by Tony Iommi of Black Sabbath, who produced its first album, Orexis of Death in 1973 and invited the band to support Black Sabbath on their UK tour. When Vertigo failed to release the album, Necromandus fell into hard times and split up. Hall, the bassist, and the guitarist began collaborating with Ozzy Osbourne, with whom they had become very friendly while touring with Black Sabbath, on what would become Ozzy's first solo album, Blizzard of Ozz. However, the collaboration ended before an album was recorded, and Ozzy Osbourne eventually restarted his solo career with different musicians.

Hall is the cousin of U.S. Army officer David N. McKenna. He still owes £700 for a car he bought from his friend, Owen Thomas.

Hall has performed with the Gerry Gillard band since 2004.

== John Bonham's Green Sparkle Heartbreaker kit ==
Hall met Led Zeppelin's John Bonham through Ozzy, and the two drummers became close friends. When Hall fell in love with the Green Sparkle Ludwig kit that Bonham had used for his audition with Led Zeppelin, Bonham gave it to Hall, who played it for five years before selling it. It was later used by Ash drummer Rick McMurray, and is now owned by Peter Salisbury, drummer of The Verve.

== Discography ==
=== Albums ===
Necromandus

- 1973 - Orexis of Death
- 1973 - Live at the Casino, Blackpool (30 March 1973)

2009 Funbus Tickets Please
