= Once Around the World (song) =

Single by It Bites

from the album Once Around the World
- Released: March 1988
- Recorded: Manor Studios, Oxfordshire, 1988
- Genre: Progressive rock
- Length: 14:46
- Label: Virgin (UK), Geffen (US)
- Songwriter: Francis Dunnery
- Producers: Steve Hillage, It Bites

It Bites singles chronology
"Midnight" (1988)	"Once Around the World" (1988)	"Still Too Young to Remember" (1989)

Once Around the World is the seventh single by It Bites. It was written by Francis Dunnery and released in March 1988. The eponymous album signaled a departure from the more directly pop-oriented sound of It Bites' first album, something demonstrated explicitly by this fourteen-minute title track in full progressive rock style.
