= Made in Space =

Made in Space may refer to:

- Made in Space (album), a 2011 album by Francis Dunnery
- Made In Space, Inc., an American aerospace company
