= The Tall Ships =

Studio album by It Bites
- Released: October 2008
- Recorded: Outhouse Studios, Running Frog Studios
- Genre: Progressive rock, pop rock
- Length: 1:09:09 (Normal Version); 1:15:12 (Japanese Version)
- Label: The It Bites Music Partnership
- Producer: It Bites

It Bites chronology
Eat Me in St. Louis (1989)	The Tall Ships (2008)	Map of the Past (2012)

The Tall Ships is the fourth studio album by British progressive rock band It Bites.

The Tall Ships was recorded following the relaunch of It Bites featuring a new singer & guitarist, John Mitchell. This lineup toured successfully in 2006 and released a live album called When the Lights Go Down on which they predominantly covered old material from the band's first lineup (bar one song, "Playground", written by the current band featuring Mitchell, which would be recorded again for The Tall Ships).

It Bites spent eight months writing and recording The Tall Ships, with writing duties predominantly handled by Mitchell and keyboardist John Beck. The band's bass guitarist, Dick Nolan, did not contribute to recording sessions, and consequently, all bass guitar parts were played by Beck and Mitchell in what they would describe as an ...And Then There Were Three situation. Nolan would be asked to leave the band shortly before the release of the album and would be replaced by Lee Pomeroy.

The Tall Ships was released in 2008, nineteen years after the release of the band's previous studio album, Eat Me in St. Louis. Initially released by the band themselves, it subsequently gained a full release on the Inside Out label. The album features different bonus tracks according to region of release; the European release bonus track is "When I Fall" and the Japanese release features "These Words".

== Track listing ==
1. "Oh My God" (5:49)
2. "Ghosts" (4:47)
3. "Playground" (5:34)
4. "Memory of Water" (4:51)
5. "The Tall Ships" (6:19)
6. "The Wind That Shakes the Barley" (8:14)
7. "Great Disasters" (5:01)
8. "Fahrenheit" (5:18)
9. "For Safekeeping" (5:29)
10. "Lights" (4:56)
11. "This is England" (13:51)
12. "When I Fall" (4:41) (European edition only)
13. "These Words" (6:03) (Japanese special edition only)

== Personnel ==
It Bites

- John Mitchell - lead vocals, guitars, bass guitar
- John Beck - keyboards, backing & harmony vocals, bass guitar
- Bob Dalton - drums, backing vocals

Additional personnel

- Tim Turan - mastering
- Paul Tippett - design, art direction, band photography

== Charts ==
Chart (2009)	Peak position
Japanese Albums Chart	140
