= Welcome to the Wild Country =

Studio album by Francis Dunnery
- Released: 1991
- Genre: Hard rock
- Length: 1:04:07
- Label: Virgin

Francis Dunnery chronology
Welcome to the Wild Country (1991)	Fearless (1994)

Welcome to the Wild Country is the debut solo album of British musician Francis Dunnery, released following his departure from his former band It Bites.

The album was not a commercial success upon release and was initially released only in Japan. It was the only album which Dunnery released via Virgin Records (who had previously handled It Bites). The album was rereleased (and remastered, with extra tracks) on Dunnery's own record label Aquarian Nation in 2001.

== Track listing ==
1. "Jack Won't Let You Go"
2. "Welcome to the Wild Country"
3. "Driving in the Rain"
4. "Kiss Me"
5. "Jackal in Your Mind"
6. "Heartache Reborn"
7. "All I Ever Wanted Was You"
8. "Just Like My Father Said It Would Be"
9. "Mr. No No"
10. "The Possibilities of Loving You"
11. "Another Day"

Bonus Tracks on 2001 rerelease:

1. "The Mother and Father of Love"
2. "Peace for Our Time"

== Personnel ==
- Vocals & Guitar - Francis Dunnery
- Drums - Nan Bador
- Bass - Vegas Lea
- Piano - David Hentschel
- Backing Vocals - Alex Brown (appears courtesy of MCA records), Carmen Lucretia (appears courtesy of Arista Records) & Anita Sherman
