= The Big Lad in the Windmill =

Studio album by It Bites
- Released: 25 August 1986
- Genre: Progressive rock
- Length: 43:07
- Label: Virgin (UK), Geffen (US)
- Producer: Alan Shacklock

It Bites chronology
The Big Lad in the Windmill (1986)	Once Around the World (1988)

Singles from The Big Lad in the Windmill
- 1. "All in Red" Released: 10 March 1986; 2. "Calling All the Heroes" Released: 23 June 1986; 3. "Whole New World" Released: 29 September 1986

Professional ratings
Review scores
Source	Rating
AllMusic	4/5 stars

The Big Lad in the Windmill is the debut album by British progressive pop/rock band It Bites.

The album reached No. 35 in the UK albums chart and produced three singles — "All in Red", "Calling All the Heroes" and "Whole New World". "Calling All the Heroes" and "Whole New World" both charted with the former reaching No. 6 in the UK charts and remaining the band's biggest and only significant hit.

Although marketed as a 1980s pop album, The Big Lad in the Windmill features an unusual mix of musical styles including pop, hard rock, Prince-style funk, power balladry and progressive rock, often all within the same song. The album also showcased the band's musical virtuosity, featuring multiple changes of dynamics and tempo plus prominent guitar and keyboard solos. The version of "Calling All the Heroes" included on the album is the full-length version rather than the better-known single edit, and features additional musical sections plus several false endings.

== Reception ==
Paul Stump, in his 1997 History of Progressive Rock, called The Big Lad in the Windmill "stunning", citing its mix of "satirically clichéd cock-rock posturings ... with punkish timbral abrasiveness and a harmonic arsenal which recalled the great days of 1960s epic pop more graphically and wrenchingly than any of the 'subversive' new-poppers ever did." He made special note of how "Wanna Shout" repeatedly reintroduces a Prince-style riff with dramatic jerks in the tempo, making the tune danceable in an ingeniously perverse way.

== Track listing ==
UK/European version

1. "I Got You Eating Out of My Hand" (5:36)
2. "All in Red" (3:31)
3. "Whole New World" (4:25)
4. "Screaming on the Beaches" (3:45)
5. "Wanna Shout" (3:13)
6. "Turn Me Loose" (4:11)
7. "Cold, Tired and Hungry" (4:16)
8. "Calling All the Heroes" (5:33)
9. "You'll Never Go to Heaven" (7:12)
10. "The Big Lad in the Windmill" (0:47)

North American version

1. "All in Red" (3:31)
2. "Turn Me Loose" (4:11)
3. "Calling All the Heroes" (5:33)
4. "Whole New World" (4:25)
5. "I Got You Eating Out Of My Hand" (6:07)
6. "You'll Never Go to Heaven" (7:12)
7. "Screaming on the Beaches" (3:45)
8. "Cold, Tired and Hungry" (4:17)
9. "Wanna Shout" (3:13)
10. "The Big Lad in the Windmill" (0:47)

== Personnel ==
It Bites

- Francis Dunnery - guitars, lead vocals
- John Beck - keyboards, backing vocals, 5th harmony vocals
- Dick Nolan - bass guitar, backing vocals
- Bob Dalton - drums, backing vocals

Additional personnel

- The Kick Horns - brass on "Whole New World"

== Charts ==
Chart	Peak position
UK Albums Chart	35
