= Also Eden =

Progressive rock band

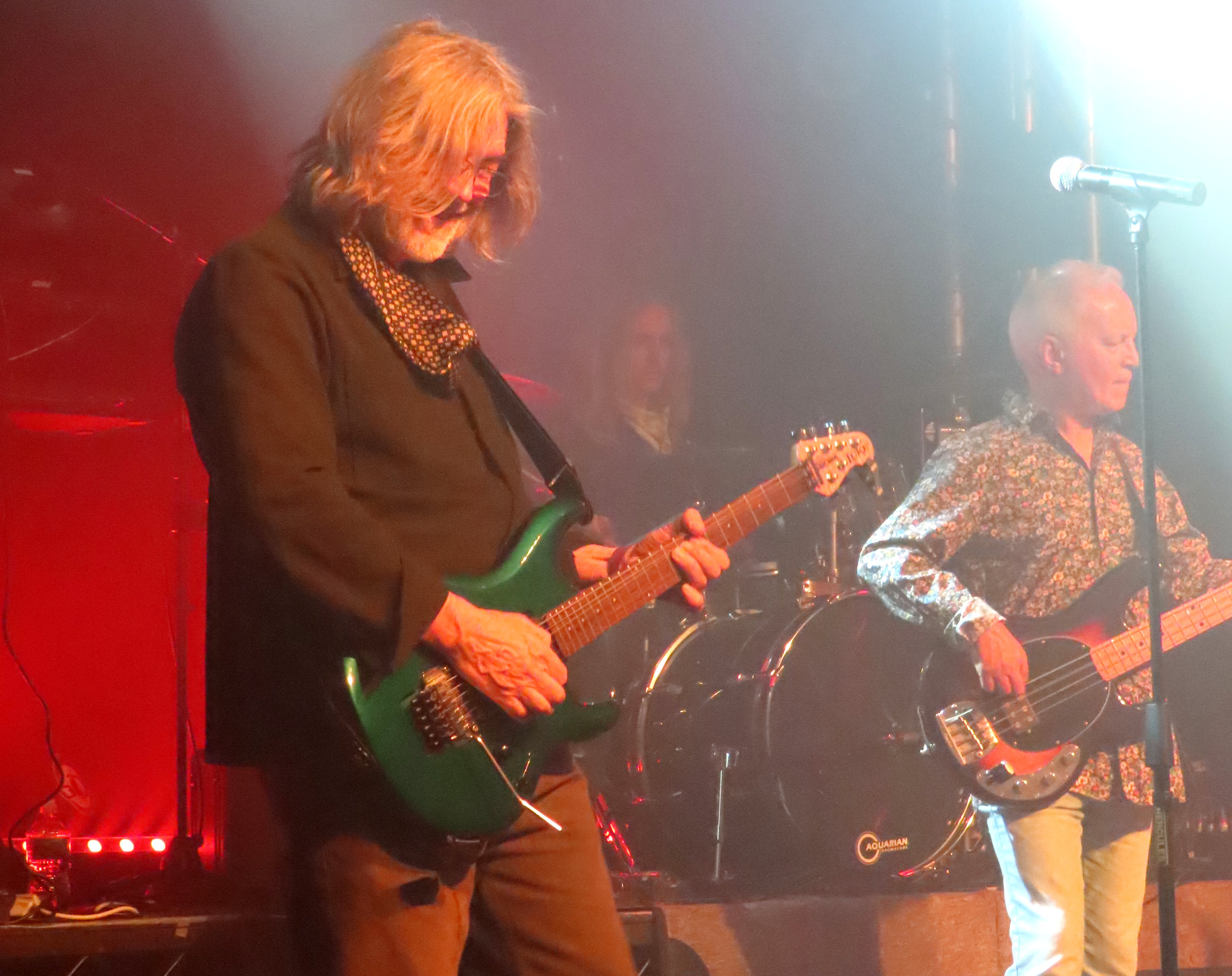
- Also Eden in 2025

Background information
- Origin: Southwest England
- Genres: Progressive rock, art rock, pop rock
- Years active: 2005–present
- Label: F2
- Members: Huw Lloyd Jones; Graham Lane; Simon Rogers; Ian Hodson; Guy Monk
- Past members: Cliff Davies; Rich Harding; Ralvin Thomas; Steve Dunn; Tim Coleman; Mark Hall; Steve Byrne; Howard H Sinclair; Andy Riger; Lee Nicholas; Dave Roelofs
- Website: www.alsoeden.band

Also Eden is an English rock band that was formed in 2005, when vocalist Huw Lloyd-Jones and keyboardist/vocalist Ian Hodson, who had been working on material together up to that point, invited Simon Rogers to join them. As of 2024 the band have released four studio albums and an EP, and have toured the United Kingdom and Europe since the mid-2000s, including four appearances at Summers End UK, and slots at Night Of The Prog at Loreley in Germany and The Cambridge Rock Festival (2011), Northern Prog Festival (NL) (2022) and the inaugural Nene Valley Rock Festival (2023). Also Eden's third studio album, Think of the Children!, was released in October 2011 via F2 Records and received an 8/10 review from Geoff Barton in Classic Rock.

== Musical style ==
The band's sound draws influences from classic progressive rock artists such as Yes, Genesis, Marillion and Rush, as well as inspiration from the “metal, fusion, classical and classic rock genres". The band has also cited contemporary bands such as Porcupine Tree and Opeth as influences.

== History ==
In 1993, vocalist Huw Lloyd-Jones moved from South Wales to Cheltenham, where he responded to a local newspaper advertisement seeking a singer for the metal band Morgan. After an audition, Lloyd-Jones joined the band, whose keyboardist was Ian Hodson. Morgan performed one concert before becoming inactive, after which Lloyd-Jones and Hodson began writing music together.

With nearly an album's worth of material written, Lloyd-Jones and Hodson recruited local musicians to form the band Eden and began performing live. After two performances and several lineup changes, the band went on hiatus when Lloyd-Jones suffered a brain haemorrhage. In 2003, Lloyd-Jones and Hodson resumed writing music together.

The lineup later included Ralvin Thomas on bass and Simon Rogers on guitar. Rogers, Lloyd-Jones and Hodson contributed to the writing of the band's debut album, About Time, which this lineup recorded. The album included the tracks "Between the Lines" and "For Bumble".

Before the release of the album, the band discovered that the name Eden was already in use by other bands in the UK and subsequently changed its name to Also Eden.

Following the release of About Time, the band performed extensively.

The band's second album, It’s Kind of You to Ask, was written in 2007 and recorded and released in 2008. By this time, the lineup included Tim Coleman on drums and Steve Dunn on bass; Coleman was later replaced by Steve Byrne and then Dave Roelofs. During 2008 and 2009, the band performed at Night of the Progs in Loreley, Germany, Progfarm in the Netherlands, and ProckFest in Germany, as well as at shows in the UK, Belgium, the Netherlands, Germany, and Switzerland. The band's final performance of 2009 was at the Summer's End Festival.

In December 2009, Lloyd-Jones left the band. Rich Harding subsequently joined as the new vocalist, and the band began work on the EP Differences as Light. Harding was later involved in a serious cycling accident.

During Harding's recovery, the band recorded its third album, Think of the Children!, which was released in 2011, and continued to perform live. In 2012, Dave Roelofs and Steve Dunn left the band and were replaced by Lee Nicholas and Graham Lane. Ian Hodson left in 2013.

Following Hodson's departure, the band recorded its fourth album, [REDACTED]. Andy Davies and Howard Sinclair contributed keyboards, with Sinclair also performing live with the band.

During this period, Lloyd-Jones worked with the band Unto Us, which also included Dave Roelofs. Unto Us released the album The Human Landscape in 2014.

In 2015, Rogers contributed guitar to the band Ghost Community. The band released the album Cycle of Life in 2016. Also Eden subsequently went on hiatus while the album was promoted.

In 2016, Lloyd-Jones and Hodson reunited as members of Midnight Sun. The band released its debut album, Dark Tide Rising, in 2018.

In 2018, Lloyd-Jones, Hodson and Rogers discussed a reunion performance to mark the tenth anniversary of It’s kind of you to ask. Steve Dunn was unable to participate because of work commitments, and Graham Lane joined the lineup. Plans for the reunion were delayed by the COVID-19 pandemic until October 2021, when the band headlined a performance at The 1865 in Southampton. The band continued as a group following the reunion.

== Line-up ==
=== Current members ===
- Huw Lloyd-Jones – Vocals
- Graham Lane – Bass Guitar, backing vocals
- Ian Hodson – Keyboards, backing vocals
- Simon Rogers – Guitar, backing vocals
- Guy Monk – Drums

=== Former members ===
- Rich Harding – Vocals
- Ralvin Thomas – Bass
- Steve Dunn – Bass
- Tim Coleman – Drums
- Mark "DB" Hall – Drums
- Steve Byrne – Drums
- Andy Rigler – Keyboards
- Howard "H" Sinclair – Keyboards, backing vocals
- Lee Nicholas – Drums
- Dave Roelofs – Drums

== Discography ==
=== Studio albums ===
- About Time (2006)
- It’s Kind of You to Ask (2008)
- Think of the Children! (2011)
- [REDACTED] (2013)

=== EPs ===
- Differences as Light (2010)
- holy books and credit cards 1: promises (2026)
- holy books and credit cards 2: waves (2026)

=== Guest and session appearances (current members) ===
Simon Rogers:

- Francis Dunnery – There's a Whole New World Out There – Guitar on the track Kiss Like Judas
- Cosmograf – When Age Has Done Its Duty (2011) – 12 String Acoustic, Electric Guitars, E Bow on the track On Which We Stand (written by Robin Armstrong/Simon Rogers)

Huw Lloyd-Jones:

Cosmograf – When Age Has Done Its Duty (2011) – Lead Vocal on the song "Memory Lost"
