= The Gulley Flats Boys =

Studio album by Francis Dunnery
- Released: 2005
- Genre: Singer/Songwriter

Francis Dunnery chronology
Man (2001)	The Gulley Flats Boys (2005)	There's a Whole New World Out There (2009)

The Gulley Flats Boys is an album from British musician Francis Dunnery, first released in 2005 as a double CD, and later reissued as a download. The title of the album is a reference to the council estate in Cumbria, North-west England where Francis grew up alongside the friends pictured on the original CD cover.

Sonically it is very stripped down, revolving almost entirely around Dunnery's vocals and acoustic guitar playing and piano courtesy of David Sancious. There are also elements of minimal percussion and other supporting instrumentation, but Dunnery and Sancious remain the core throughout. The album features two re-recordings of older songs (Good Life and Heartache Reborn). The latter is almost entirely re-worked, changing from the original mid-tempo stomp to a much more reflective and mournful ballad.

In 2022 Dunnery revisited the original recordings of The Gulley Flats Boys and tweaked them sonically, remixing the album (without plug ins, equalisation or synthetic processing) to bring out more character and depth. Alongside the remixed vocal version of it he issued an instrumental version, so that listeners could hear the nuances and subtleties that Sancious, Dorie Jackson (backing vocals) and Dunnery were playing and singing. He stated that there would be a vinyl version of the remix available in 2024, though it is yet to appear.

Lyrically, the album is very personal, dealing with reaching the 'middle of life'. The melancholy and mature tone of much of the music perfectly reflects the subject matter. There are many moments Dunnery looks back to his younger days - old friends and places from his youth are mentioned (the title Gulley Flats Boys refers to the social circle of his youth on the Gulley Flats estate in hometown Egremont, Cumbria). Dunnery has stated that the album deals with a mid-life crisis of sorts.

== Track listing ==
Disc One

1. "Soldier"
2. "Give Up and Let it Go"
3. "Autumn the Rain Man"
4. "In My Father's Eyes"
5. "My Old Friend Love"
6. "Bobbie Jo"
7. "Joy"
8. "The Middle of Life"

Disc Two

1. "Living in New York City"
2. "Just a Man"
3. "Good Life"
4. "Chocolate Heart"
5. "Heartache Reborn"
6. "The Gulley Flats Boys"
7. "Someone Like Me"
