= Tall Blonde Helicopter =

Studio album by Francis Dunnery
- Released: 1995

Francis Dunnery chronology
Fearless (1994)	Tall Blonde Helicopter (1995)	Let's Go Do What Happens (1998)

Tall Blonde Helicopter is the third studio album from British musician Francis Dunnery, released in 1995. The album showed Dunnery stripping down the arrangements and production of the previous album, and the material focused more on his acoustic guitar playing, giving it a folk-rock flavour. Three singles were released from the album; "Too Much Saturn", "The Way Things Are" and "I Believe I Can Change My World". To promote the album, Atlantic Records released a VHS cassette with sixteen minutes of footage, including live material. "Father and Son" is a cover version of a Cat Stevens song.

== Track listing ==
All tracks are written by Francis Dunnery, except where noted

No.	Title	Writer(s)	Length
1.	"48 Hours"		3:25
2.	"The Way Things Are"		4:04
3.	"Too Much Saturn"		4:06
4.	"In My Dreams"		3:33
5.	"Sunshine"		4:00
6.	"Rain or Shine"		4:05
7.	"The Johnny Podell Song"		3:13
8.	"I Believe I Can Change My World"		3:08
9.	"I Don't Want to be Alternative"		1:25
10.	"Because I Can"		3:56
11.	"Immaculate"		4:47
12.	"Only New York Going On"		5:20
13.	"Father and Son"	Cat Stevens	3:47
14.	"Grateful and Thankful"		4:31
15.	"Little Snake"		1:07

== Personnel ==
- Pat Buchanan - guitar
- Brad Jones - bass
- Greg Morrow - drums
- Jill Sobule - backing vocals (track 6)
- Garry Tallent - bass
- Francis Dunnery - vocals, bass, guitar
