= Fearless (Francis Dunnery album) =

Studio album by Francis Dunnery
- Released: 1994
- Genre: Pop rock, soft rock, folk rock, blues rock, funk rock, reggae fusion
- Label: Atlantic

Francis Dunnery chronology
Welcome to the Wild Country (1991)	Fearless (1994)	Tall Blonde Helicopter (1995)

Singles from Album
- 1. "American Life in the Summertime" Released: 1994; 2. "What's He Gonna Say" Released: 1995; 3. "Homegrown" Released: 1995

Fearless is the second album from British musician Francis Dunnery, released in 1994. This release saw Dunnery move toward a pop direction, in what is perhaps his most straightforwardly commercial work. It also, at various points throughout the album, incorporates elements of rock, funk, blues, reggae and Eastern music.

The album yielded three singles; "American Life in the Summertime", "Homegrown" and "What's He Gonna Say". These singles had varying degrees of success, and saw him making many appearances on television including the Australian Music Awards. A promotional video was made for What's He Gonna Say.

== Track listing ==
1. "American Life in the Summertime"
2. "Homegrown"
3. "Fade Away"
4. "Climbing up the Love Tree"
5. "What's He Gonna Say"
6. "Feel Like Kissing You Again"
7. "King of the Blues"
8. "Everyone's a Star"
9. "Couldn't Find a Reason"
10. "New Vibration"
11. "Good Life"

== Charts ==
Chart (1994)	Peak position
Australian Albums (ARIA Charts)	69
