= There's a Whole New World Out There =

Studio album by Francis Dunnery
- Released: 2009
- Label: Aquarian Nation

Francis Dunnery chronology
The Gulley Flats Boys (2005)	There's a Whole New World Out There (2009)	Made in Space (2011)

There's a Whole New World Out There is an album by Francis Dunnery, released in 2009. It is mostly made up of cover versions, and re-recordings of songs from throughout Francis' career. Consisting of two discs, it was released on Dunnery's own record label Aquarian Nation.

== Track listing ==
Disc one

1. "Whole New World"
2. "Kiss Like Judas"
3. "Holiday"
4. "Old Man and the Angel"
5. "Animal Life and Water Life"
6. "Calling to You"
7. "Still Too Young to Remember"
8. "Hunting The Whale"
9. "Back in New York City (Genesis cover)"
10. "Staring at the Whitewash"

Disc two

1. "Underneath Your Pillow"
2. "Sister Sarah"
3. "Glad and Sorry"
4. "Let Us All Go"
5. "Charlie"
6. "Yellow Christian"
7. "Murder of the Planet Earth"
8. "Love Will Tear Us Apart"
9. "Still Life in Mobile Homes"
10. "Feels Like Summertime"
