= Made in Space (album) =

Studio album by Francis Dunnery
- Released: 2011
- Genre: Pop, R&B, Electronic
- Label: Aquarian Nation

Francis Dunnery chronology
There's a Whole New World Out There (2009)	Made in Space (2011)	Frankenstein Monster (2013)

Made in Space is an album released by songwriter Francis Dunnery. It was released in 2011 and is his seventh album of new material. It is a departure from his previous records in that it features many elements more akin to contemporary R&B music, alongside his pop songwriting sensibility.

== Track listing ==
1. "Moonflower"
2. "Picked You Up and Now I Can't Let You Go"
3. "Little Tears from a Big Pair of Brown Eyes"
4. "Made in Space"
5. "You Make the World Bow Down"
6. "Ford and the Dreamers"
7. "Bat Thing"
8. "Fire on the Plane"
9. "Haunted"
10. "Seventeen Fires of Love"
