= It Bites =

English rock band

- Origin: Egremont, Cumbria, England
- Genres: Progressive rock; pop rock; art rock
- Years active: 1982–1983; 1984–1990; 2006–2024
- Labels: Virgin; Geffen
- Members: Bob Dalton; John Beck; John Mitchell
- Past members: Francis Dunnery; Dick Nolan; Howard "H" Smith; Lee Knott; Lee Pomeroy

It Bites were an English progressive rock and pop fusion band, formed in Egremont, Cumbria, in 1982 and best known for their 1986 single "Calling All the Heroes", which gained them a Top 10 UK Singles Chart hit.

Initially fronted by Francis Dunnery, the band recorded three studio albums before splitting in 1990. The band eventually reformed in 2006 with new frontman John Mitchell replacing Dunnery, recording two further studio albums before eventually going into hiatus in 2014 and quietly dissolving a decade later. Dunnery currently leads an intermittently active alternative version of the band called "It Bites FD" (featuring himself leading a varied set of other musicians).

== Musical style ==
The band have been described as having "a strong art-rock tendency" by AllMusic, while website Über Rock has stated, "It Bites have always been one of the more curious cases of the progressive rock world. Their first impression on us back in the 1980s was that of a pop band. But a pop band doing what no pop band had the right to do – successfully mix catchy tunes with complex musicianship and, god forbid, distorted guitars."

Paul Stump, in his History of Progressive Rock, said that "It Bites, of all the 1980s progressive revivalists, truly understood - if perhaps only instinctively - the contemporaneous impossibility of 'progressing' in the mainstream of rock, and the possibilities that opened up. ... While the likes of IQ and Pendragon attempted to achieve novelty with rock voicings coined ten years previously, It Bites subtly (and unsubtly) stole and reused 1980s devices for some of the best-balanced combinations of virtuosity and gut excitement British rock has heard. ... It Bites' sheer èlan, coupled with their ability to grab a wider range of used ideas than their contemporaries, hoisted them aloft and singular as a landmark act."

In a 2023 interview, Dunnery and Beck cited a wide range of It Bites band influences, from pop (Paul McCartney, Level 42, Donny Osmond, The Carpenters and Racey), hard rock (Necromandus), jazz-rock (Bruford, Soft Machine, Mahavishnu Orchestra and Allan Holdsworth), progressive rock (Genesis, Focus, Yes and UK), funk and soul (George Benson, Cameo, Steve Arrington, Michael Franks). Regarding the band's association with progressive rock, Dunnery has also remarked "I don’t like prog for prog’s sake; if a song doesn’t have a beautiful melody then I want nothing to do with it."

== History ==
=== Lineup 1, 1982–1990 ===
==== Early years – 1982–1985 ====
Originally formed by drummer Bob Dalton, bass player Dick Nolan and guitarist/singer Francis Dunnery, It Bites started out in early 1980s in the market town of Egremont in Cumbria, UK. Keyboard player John Beck from Whitehaven joined the group later in 1982, and for a short period of time It Bites also featured saxophonist Howard "H" Smith, a period in which the band worked playing gigs at nightclubs around Cumbria working mostly on pop covers by the likes of Haircut 100 and Level 42. The band split up in 1983, when Dalton and Nolan moved to Birmingham, Dunnery to London and Beck to Manchester.

It Bites reunited in 1984 after a meet-up in Egremont, with Nolan, Dalton and Beck opting to follow Dunnery and relocate entirely to London. All four members squatted a house in Peckham (50 Nutcroft Road) and spent a year living hand-to-mouth but writing and rehearsing original material. Bob Dalton later commented "it was actually the perfect situation because all we could afford to do was write songs 24/7. All that time was the making of us. We became strong writers and strong players." Their demo tape eventually secured them a management deal with Martyn Mayhead (at WEA Records), and shortly afterwards a recording contract with Virgin Records.

==== Single success, The Big Lad in the Windmill – 1986–1987 ====
In March 1986, It Bites released their first single "All in Red", which charted only modestly. Their second single, "Calling All the Heroes", was released in June 1986 and became a big hit, reaching No. 6 in the UK Singles Chart and gaining the band a huge amount of radio play and many television appearances (including Top of the Pops, Wogan, and The Old Grey Whistle Test).

John Beck would later reflect that "it was like Jeff Beck and "Hi Ho bloody Silver Lining"... a big hit but unrepresentative of the artist." Dunnery has commented "if it wasn't for that song nobody would have heard of us. We were doing progressive rock, which was the most unhip thing you could think of. But we weren't a band trying to manipulate the public – we knew nothing about things like hit records. We just wanted to be like Yes, Genesis, Mahavishnu, UK and Focus. We had zero interest in being in the charts. I still think that if the person I am now could talk to It Bites back then, we could have had four hits from each of our albums."

The third single, "Whole New World", also charted; but not at such a high position, peaking at number 54. All three singles appeared on the first It Bites album The Big Lad in the Windmill (produced by Alan Shacklock), which was released in the summer of 1986 but met with only moderate commercial success, despite charting at number 35.

The band toured with Go West, Cardiacs and Marillion during 1987, and played major European outdoor festivals including the Montreux Jazz Festival, broadcast live across Europe by Swiss TV. This diverse set of support slots and headline shows revealed a problem in marketing the band which would last throughout their career. It Bites' blend of contemporary 1980s producer-pop, progressive rock and hard rock (setting glossy keyboards and massed harmony vocals against heavy drumming, complex time signatures and Allan-Holdsworth-inspired guitar solos) would draw criticism from some music press writers who accused the band of failing to settle on a coherent direction. Dunnery developed a tendency to hit back at the press, often insulting them from the stage. ("I felt insulted by those idiots. If someone punches me in the face, I’ll punch them back.") Despite this, the band forged a loyal and enthusiastic following in the UK.

==== Once Around the World – 1987–1988 ====
The band began recording their second album Once Around The World with engineer Nick Froome in 1987, producing two tracks, "Plastic Dreamer" and "Old Man and the Angel". Mark Wallis came onboard as producer in mid-1987, with footage of the process being broadcast on Channel 4 TV's "Equinox" programme Twang, Bang, Kerrang! (which documented the history of the electric guitar and prominently featured Francis Dunnery comparing his Japanese and American Fender Stratocaster guitars and discussing technique and equipment.

The Wallis collaboration resulted in two further songs (including the album's length title track) before Steve Hillage was brought in to stabilise the chaotic recording sessions and complete the record. Dunnery has recalled that "Steve made us realise that we needed to write some three-minute singles because one of the songs [the title track] was almost 16 minutes long. Steve was a gentle soul. He did a great job on our stuff. I really, really loved working with him... "Midnight", "Black December", "Kiss Like Judas", "Yellow Christian". Steve helped with the mechanics of those songs."

Despite the chaotic sessions, Once Around The World was released in March 1988 and signaled a departure from the more directly pop-oriented sound of It Bites' first album, demonstrated explicitly by a fourteen-minute title track in full progressive rock style. The first single from the album (a heavily edited version of "Old Man and the Angel") peaked at number 72 in the singles charts, while the Steve Hillage sessions had produced some more pop-orientated material, including the minor hit singles "Kiss Like Judas" (February 1988) and "Midnight" (April 1988). The band toured to support the release, including some early 1988 support slots for Robert Plant.

During this period, Dunnery also gained some press attention for his invention of the Tapboard, an instrument based on two paired guitar necks and using a ten-finger tapping technique to create exceptionally fast and clear melodic runs and chording.

==== Eat Me in St Louis and the shift towards hard rock – 1989 ====
The third album, Eat Me in St. Louis was recorded in early 1989 at Musicland Studios in Munich, Germany, produced by Reinhold Mack (best known for work with Queen and The Rolling Stones). The album featured a harder-edged, more guitar-orientated sound than before, with shorter, punchier songs and the direct progressive rock influences cut back.

In contemporary interviews, Dunnery claimed to have become dissatisfied with the more technical and virtuosic side of It Bites' music as demonstrated on the previous album – "That was very important to us at the time. We wanted to say to people, Look, but aren't we very clever? I can't be bothered now to write all them long sections, I just wanna see some good songs... Instead of flying around at 9,000 miles an hour, I've been playing tunes that people can remember." However, the band also chose to commission the artwork for Eat Me in St. Louis and its early single releases from the progressive rock sleeve artist Roger Dean, in what Dunnery admitted was a calculated attempt to play on their own "progressive rock" reputation and to "annoy people."

On its release, Eat Me in St. Louis scored excellent reviews in rock magazines Kerrang! and RAW and spawned the minor hit single "Still Too Young To Remember". During this period, Virgin made strong attempts to break the band as a serious hard rock act with several re-releases and video shoots for "Still Too Young To Remember" and the follow-ups "Underneath Your Pillow" and "Sister Sarah". Although Virgin's efforts to boost the band's commercial profile were ultimately unsuccessful, the band still proved themselves popular as a live act, playing sell-out gigs across the UK, US and Japan, and touring with Jethro Tull and the Beach Boys. Certain band members also participated in outside projects – Nolan recording with Tony Banks (on his 1989 Bankstatement album) and Dunnery singing backing vocals on the debut Anderson Bruford Wakeman Howe album during the same year.

==== Departure of Francis Dunnery – mid-1990 ====
It Bites showcased some new post-Eat Me in St. Louis material on an eight-date UK tour during March and April 1990. In June 1990, the band travelled to Los Angeles, to start writing and recording their fourth album. This was intended to be the record to break the American market, and Dunnery promised simpler songs with "a stronger taste of blues." However, tensions within the band reached breaking point during the pre-rehearsal period, and it was confirmed to the band's fanclub in November 1990 that the band had parted company with Francis Dunnery. Dunnery is rumoured to have demanded full band leadership and control over material, and it's also claimed that he clashed with former creative foil John Beck to the extent that he demanded Beck's expulsion from the band.

In 2024, Dunnery claimed that "the difficulty (had been) in the hierarchy of things... In every band there's somebody who carries the vision forward. It's not that the other guys aren't important because they do contribute, but there's a guy like George Michael (in Wham!) and Freddie Mercury (in Queen). It's not that Brian May isn't important, but the vision came from Freddie. When there's somebody that doesn't want to go along with that vision, a breakdown always follows... The guys wouldn't accept my vision. I'm driven; I'll do more in a day than others do in a month. I'm the one getting everyone else out of bed."

Asked in 2024 about the circumstances of the split, Dunnery replied "there are a million different answers I could give you. We were under a lot of pressure to come up with huge success when nobody really knew what we should be doing. All we were being told was: "No, that's not right," or, "No, you can't do that." Towards the end of It Bites there was a lot of trying to make the sun shine when it was raining. It became obvious that we just didn't fit into what was going on within the industry. Nobody wanted us. It was like being English in a Welsh bar... The most profound thing was realising that it didn't matter the kind of music we were making. The music side of things was the least important. That was the saddest thing. Walking away from all of that felt very liberating. I’ve got a brash personality and that didn't help. I was still drinking and I didn't have very good social skills. I was too much of a live wire and in that sense I contributed to my own downfall."

In 2023, Dunnery looked back on his time with the band and reflected, candidly, that It Bites "weren’t particularly into being successful – we just wanted to play twenty-minute long songs and smoke pot, after drinking thirty bottles of wine. It was tremendous. We were frighteningly authentic. It Bites were always the real deal... we just didn’t have the savvy to market ourselves because we weren’t trying to be successful. To this day I don’t think Bob, Dick or John gave a shit about success or fame. None of us did." He also paid tribute to his musical relationship with John Beck, stating "We wrote outrageous shit together. If I didn’t have to wait three hours outside his house in a van every time I wanted to play music with him, then I’d go round there right now and I’d sleep with him."

=== Lineup 2, 1990 ===
Now minus Dunnery, the remaining trio initially stayed on in Los Angeles, continuing to write and auditioning new singers. Returning to England, they recruited Lee Knott as the new It Bites singer. Knott had previously fronted the band Innocence Lost, who had played support slots to It Bites on previous UK dates. During this period, John Beck had also switched instruments, later recalling that "at the time I think we were all sick of what was happening and wanted a total change. I was playing guitar, and a little bit of keyboards, but mainly guitar. It was a change for me, and Bob and Dick were happy doing that."

A new It Bites album was initially scheduled for early 1991. This was ultimately replaced by a live album covering the Francis Dunnery years, Thank You And Goodnight, which was mostly drawn from Eat Me in St. Louis tour recordings and released in August 1991.

In an attempt to refresh their identity, the Knott-fronted It Bites renamed themselves as Navajo Kiss and played several gigs under that name. The concerts featured new material plus a vigorous cover of "Murder of the Planet Earth" (from Eat Me in St. Louis). A second name-change – to Sister Sarah – followed, but the band split quietly within the year due to lack of enthusiasm from audiences. John Beck would later admit "we found out pretty soon that people weren’t about to go along with such a change in direction." The various band members went their separate ways but remained in touch.

=== Post-split – 1990–2005 ===
==== Sessions, Superior, Unicorn Jones, Dunnery solo and Kino ====
After the split of It Bites, Beck and Dalton joined John Wetton's band for a Japanese tour and a live album, Chasing The Dragon, with Beck moving on to become one of the keyboard players for the Alan Parsons Project. Nolan (who also worked for the Alan Parsons Project) eventually established himself as Ray Davies' bass player of choice. Dalton played drums for Chris Norman and Ray Davies and moved into teaching at the Academy of Contemporary Music in Guildford.

A partial It Bites reunion appeared in 1996 in the shape of the band Unicorn Jones. This project featured John Beck, Dick Nolan and singer David Banks (who'd once auditioned for It Bites and who'd previously been part of the band Mummy Calls, whose song "Beauty Has Her Way" appeared on the soundtrack to the film "The Lost Boys"). Banks had approached Beck and Nolan to help him record an album of Burt Bacharach covers, but the trio had been sidetracked into recording a bizarre cover of Motörhead's "Ace of Spades" (in which they described themselves as having "replac(ed) Lemmy's timeless vocal with David's crooner voice and transform(ed) the heavy metal trash into a dark deranged groove"). This cover version spawned the Unicorn Jones band, which recorded one album – 1996's 'A Hundred Thousand Million Stars' – but did not play live.

Beck and Dalton reunited in 2005 as members of the band Kino, a progressive rock band which also featured Marillion bass player Pete Trewavas and British prog scene regular John Mitchell (Arena and others) on lead vocals and guitar. The band initially featured former Porcupine Tree drummer Chris Maitland, but the latter was later replaced by Dalton. Kino's album 'Picture' was well-received on the British prog rock scene during 2005, and the band performed versions of the It Bites songs "Kiss Like Judas" and "Plastic Dreamer" at live concerts.

=== Reunion of lineup 1 – 2003–2006 ===
On 30 August 2003, during a solo concert at the Union Chapel in London, Francis Dunnery was joined onstage by his old It Bites band-mates for the first time since 1990. John Beck joined Dunnery for a duet on the It Bites song "Hunting The Whale", following which Dick Nolan and Bob Dalton also joined in for a gig finale of "Still Too Young To Remember". Following this, it was announced that It Bites would be getting back together to write and record a new album followed by a tour.

Although some writing and initial recording did take place, the full reunion of the original lineup never materialised (apparently due to Dunnery's hectic schedule back in the United States, which affected his ability to commit to the band). The brief reunion did, however, act as a spur for some archive It Bites releases – the Live at Montreux album (originally recorded in 1987) and the DVD Live in Tokyo (featuring footage dating from the Eat Me in St Louis period.) Both were released by Bob Dalton on behalf of the band.

=== Lineup 3 – 2006–2008 ===
In 2006, It Bites opted to formally reunite, but with Beck and Dalton's Kino bandmate John Mitchell replacing Dunnery as lead singer and guitarist. According to an interview on francisdunnery.com, dated 15 October 2008, Dunnery said Bob Dalton called him out of the blue and said he was no longer wanted in the band, explaining that they already had someone to replace him. In 2024, Dunnery recollected "I don’t think I really cared. It was like someone banging my ex-wife – why would I want to listen to that? I've moved on. But I won't have anything bad said about John Mitchell because I love the guy."

Mitchell had been an enthusiastic It Bites fan since his teens, and was happy to take on the role. John Beck commented "I’ve met guitarists that could manage Frank’s licks but weren’t singers, or the other way around. John’s the first to do both. It’s all been so natural, I don’t even remember agreeing to do this; it took on a life of its own."

The new It Bites made their live debut for a well-received tour in winter 2006, playing material from the original three It Bites albums as well as premiering three new songs – "Memory of Water", "Playground" and "Lights". The tour also spawned a live album called When The Lights Go Down, released in 2007. The band began recording material for a new album (predominantly written by Mitchell and Beck) between 2006 and 2008, opting to self-produce. Recording sessions were completed in May 2008.

=== Lineup 4, 2008-2018 ===
==== The Tall Ships and recruitment of Lee Pomeroy 2008–2010 ====
On 23 June 2008 the band announced a further change to their line-up with the departure of another founder member, bass player Dick Nolan. He had failed to show up for a performance at a concert in Yorkshire, and there had been rumours of his dissatisfaction with the project. The band's statement revealed that all bass playing on the forthcoming album had in fact been performed by either John Mitchell or John Beck – in what the band referred to as "Genesis-style", a reference to the 1978 Genesis album ...And Then There Were Three... – and that It Bites had reluctantly parted company with Nolan due to his lack of commitment. Nolan would continue working with Ray Davies (and would eventually resurface in 2020 as part of the Subdeluxe band fronted by Scottish singer/songwriter Scott Donaldson).

It Bites went on to recruit Lee Pomeroy, an established British session bass guitarist and multi-instrumentalist who'd played with Take That, Mike Oldfield and Rick Wakeman's New English Rock Ensemble and shared It Bites' appreciation of English progressive rock musicians. Pomeroy had apparently been originally recommended to the band by Nolan as a potential substitute.

It Bites' comeback album – The Tall Ships – was pre-released to members of the It Bites internet forum on 21 July 2008, with a full release following on Inside Out Music in October 2008. The album generally gained good reviews and was considered an excellent comeback ranking with the best of the band's previous work. With Pomeroy installed, It Bites supported Status Quo at the latter's Whitehaven concert on 2 August 2008 and went on to their own headline tour around the UK between 26 September and 7 October 2008 with neo-prog rock newcomers Touchstone as support.

In summer 2009 It Bites played the Three Rivers Progressive Rock Festival and also toured Japan, with Level 42's guitarist Nathan King covering for an unavailable Lee Pomeroy as bass player. (King was subsequently confirmed as It Bites' regular deputising bass player for whenever Pomeroy was unavailable.) The band went on to play further British concerts in autumn 2009. A live album called This Is Japan – recorded at a Tokyo concert on 3 July 2009, and featuring King – was released in February 2010 (the album had previously been released in Japan only under the title It's Live).

On 28 February 2010, the band released a re-recorded version of their 1986 hit "Calling All The Heroes" in order to raise funds for flood relief following the Cumbrian floods of late 2009. For this release, the band were joined by various guest performers including former members Francis Dunnery and Dick Nolan. Dunnery re-sang the opening lines of the song, with the rest of the vocals handled by John Mitchell, John Wetton (Asia, King Crimson, U.K.), Jason Perry (A) and Steve Hogarth (Marillion). Further instrumental contributions came from Nolan, Geoff Downes (Asia, Yes, Buggles), Jem Godfrey (Frost*, Atomic Kitten, etc.) and various members of Marillion.

It Bites played more UK dates in March 2010 and two more dates in Japan during the same month (with Nathan King once again playing bass guitar for the Japanese concerts).

==== Map of the Past and archive releases – 2011–2018 ====
During 2011, Mitchell and Beck spent time writing for the next It Bites album. Later in the year, the album was recorded at Mitchell's own Outhouse Studios with a full band of Mitchell, Beck, Dalton and Pomeroy. In 2012, the band announced that the album would be called Map of the Past and that it would be a concept album – "inspired by the discovery of an old family photograph, Map of the Past is a highly personal journey that explores love, passion, jealousy, anger, remorse and loss through the eyes of a previous generation against the backdrop of Britain as it enters a new century and one of the most defining periods of its history." The album was released on 26 March 2012.

It Bites continued to play and tour infrequently over the following years, despite the involvement of band members with other projects (notably John Mitchell with Lonely Robot). The last full band tour to date was in 2013, although Mitchell and Beck performed an acoustic duo house concert tour in 2014.

Most band activity during this period was restricted to archive releases. In 2014, all of the albums from the band's period with Francis Dunnery as frontman were released in the boxset Whole New World – The Virgin Albums 1986–1991. In 2018, the band released another archive box set, Live in London, which contained full live recordings from three different concerts during the Dunnery era (recorded at the Marquee Club, the Astoria and Hammersmith Odeon).

=== Hiatus and eventual split of Mitchell/Beck/Dalton line-up (2019–2024) ===
On 25 May 2019, Dalton appeared to announce the formal end of the band on Facebook, stating "unfortunately It Bites won't be touring or gigging again, we don't have any plans for anything else in the future but it was a great time and we do appreciate all of you who have followed us through the years." A few days later, John Mitchell stated that neither he nor John Beck had been consulted about dissolving It Bites, and that even if Dalton had quit Mitchell and Beck might still continue working together either as It Bites or as a different project.

In late 2020, Mitchell posted about potential new It Bites work, including a Facebook comment on 13 December 2020 stating that "we're doing an It Bites album (communication permitting). We may be some time." This was followed in June 2021 by an article in Prog magazine issue 120, in which Dalton blamed the mid-decade foundering of the Mitchell-era band on "a basic lack of continuity. It was stop-start, stop-start." In the same article, Mitchell stated that work on the new album was continuing (with a line-up of Mitchell, Beck and Dalton) and that a record contract had been signed, with a view to releasing the new album at the start of 2022. By 2024, however, Mitchell was suggesting that, as regards a continuation of It Bites, "that ship has sailed" and that he was now concentrating on solo work (with no indication as to what had happened regarding the new recordings or the record contract).

Remastered versions of the band's Mitchell-era albums The Tall Ships and Map of the Past were released on 7 May 2021.

=== Francis Dunnery's It Bites FD (2019–present) ===
In 2019, erstwhile band frontman Francis Dunnery carried out a British tour with a band he referred to as "Francis Dunnery's It Bites", performing the original band's material. In addition to Dunnery, the band featured bass player Paul Brown, second guitarist Luke Machin, keyboardist/singer Pete Jones, drummer Björn Fryklund and multi-instrumentalist Quint Starkie.

By 2023, Dunnery's version of the band had been renamed It Bites FD. In September 2023, Dunnery released the double live album Live from the Black Country (recorded in Wolverhampton in January of the same year) featuring the Dunnery/Brown/Machin/Jones/Fryklund/Starkie line-up; copies of the Blu-ray edition came with a bonus EP called Raw EP, featuring three vintage It Bites tracks with all instruments performed by Dunnery. In December 2023, he announced that a new line-up of It Bites FD (Dunnery, Brown, keyboard player Tony Turrell, drummer Chad Wackerman and "atmospherics" player Dave McCracken) would undertake a short three-date UK tour for January 2024 and also release a studio album. Return to Natural was released on 19 January 2024. When asked in 2024 whether he might be interested in reuniting the original band, Dunnery replied "Well, if someone offered five million dollars to make an album, why not?"

== Personnel ==
=== Final line-up ===
- Bob Dalton – drums, backing vocals (1982–1983, 1984–1990, 2006–c.2024)
- John Beck – keyboards, keytar, guitar, bass guitar, backing and harmony vocals (1982–1983, 1984–1990, 2006–c.2024
- John Mitchell – lead vocals, guitar, bass guitar (2006–c.2024)

=== Past members ===
- Francis Dunnery – lead vocals, guitar, Tapboard (1982–1983, 1984–1990)
- Dick Nolan – bass guitar, backing vocals (1982–1983, 1984–1990, 2006–2008)
- Howard "H" Smith – saxophone (1982–1983)
- Lee Knott – lead vocals (1990)
- Lee Pomeroy – bass guitar, backing vocals (2008–2019)

Touring substitutes

- Nathan King – bass guitar, backing vocals (2008–2013)

== Discography (It Bites) ==
=== Studio albums ===
- The Big Lad in the Windmill (Virgin/Geffen, August 1986)
- Once Around the World (Virgin/Geffen, March 1988)
- Eat Me in St. Louis (Virgin/Geffen, June 1989)
- The Tall Ships (InsideOut, October 2008)
- Map of the Past (InsideOut, March 2012)

=== Compilations ===
- The It Bites Album (Virgin Japan, 1990)
- The Best of It Bites – Calling All the Heroes (EMI, 1995)
  - Re-released with two additional tracks in December 2003
- "Whole New World: The Virgin Albums 1986–1991" (Virgin, 2014)

=== Live albums ===
- Thankyou and Goodnight – Live (Virgin, August 1991)
- Live in Montreux (2003)
- When the Lights Go Down (May 2007)
- Deutsche Live! (2010; free bonus 'desktape' CD)
- This Is Japan (2010)
- Live in London (2018)

=== Singles ===
Year	Title	Peak chart positions
Year	Title	UK
"All in Red"	1986	—
"Calling All the Heroes"	1986	6
"Whole New World"	1986	54
"The Old Man and the Angel"	1987	72
"Kiss Like Judas"	1988	76
"Midnight"	1988	—
"Once Around the World"	1988	—
"Still Too Young to Remember"	1989	66
"Sister Sarah"	1989	79
"Underneath Your Pillow"	1989	81
"Still Too Young to Remember" (reissue)	1990	60
"Underneath Your Pillow" (reissue)	1990	77

=== DVDs ===
- Live in Tokyo (2003)
- It Happened One Night (2011)

== Discography (It Bites FD) ==
=== Studio albums ===
- Return To Natural (January 2024)

=== EPs ===
- Raw EP (September 2023)

=== Live albums ===
- Live from the Black Country (September 2023)
