= Orexis of Death =

Studio album by Necromandus
- Released: 1999
- Recorded: 1973
- Studio: Morgan Studios, London, UK
- Genre: Hard rock; art rock; folk jazz; progressive rock; proto-metal
- Label: Vertigo
- Producer: Tony Iommi

Necromandus chronology
Orexis of Death (1999)	Necromandus (2017)

Orexis of Death is the debut album by English rock band Necromandus. It was recorded in 1973 under the supervision of Black Sabbath guitarist Tony Iommi, but was shelved due to Barry Dunnery's departure from the band and wasn't released until 1999.

The album was re-released in 2005 under the name Orexis of Death Plus... and included two unreleased bonus tracks. It was also reissued in 2010 in its standard form, but with their Live album included.

== Track listing ==
All songs written by Bill Branch and Barry Dunnery

1. "Mogidisimo" - 0:31
2. "Nightjar" - 4:15
3. "A Black Solitude" - 4:31
4. "Homicidal Psychopath" - 3:25
5. "Still Born Beauty" - 4:08
6. "Gypsy Dancer" - 6:53
7. "Orexis of Death" - 4:31
8. "Mogidisimo (Reprise)" - 1:13

== Personnel ==
=== Necromandus ===
- Bill Branch – vocals
- Barry 'Baz' Dunnery – guitars
- Dennis McCarten – bass
- Frank Hall – drums

=== Additional personnel ===
- Tony Iommi – guitar solo on "Orexis of Death", production
