= Tapboard =

Musical instrument

Tapboard is the name of two separate guitar-based instruments that employ variations of the tapping technique. One of these is played by guitarist Francis Dunnery and the other by bassist Balazs Szendofi. Unlike other tapping instruments such as the Chapman Stick, harpejji and Warr Guitar, both Tapboards are one-off custom designs and have never been produced commercially.

== Francis Dunnery's Tapboard ==
=== Origins ===
While still a member of progressive pop band It Bites, guitarist Francis Dunnery developed a two-handed tapping technique while recording demos between 1988 and 1989. Despite a reputation for virtuosity, Dunnery lacked interest in the heavy metal tapping styles exemplified by the playing of Edward Van Halen, Randy Rhoads and others: instead, he accidentally invented a new variant on the tapping technique by laying his electric guitar on his lap and "idly tapping" on the fretboard with both hands to create polyphonic chording and fast-attack scales, drawing on his additional skills as a drummer and keyboard player. Dunnery was interested enough in his discovery to continue with his approach. He collaborated with Dave Farmiloe (chief repair technician at Arbiter Guitars—UK distributors for Fender Guitars at the time) to develop an instrument for the technique. Initial suggestions for the design included "a sphere with strings on", but Farmiloe eventually came up with the less unusual final design.

=== Design ===
The Tapboard consists of a single piece of mahogany mounted with two standard guitar necks glued flush together, side-by-side. Both necks' fretboards are deeply scalloped to aid control of note articulation. There are twelve strings (with twenty-four machine heads available), all with an extremely low action and "reverse strung". The Tapboard features two sets of pickups (one of which is apparently taken from a Hohner Clavinet previously owned by The Boomtown Rats) mounted in a substance similar to "Blackpool rock."

As with a number of other tapping instruments (such as the harpejji and the StarrBoard), the Tapboard is designed to be played on the lap, on a table or on a table-style stand, in much the same position as a pedal steel or lap steel guitar. The playing style involves the use of all ten fingers (and thumbs) in a pianistic style, with the resulting sound being similar to that of a Chapman Stick. Dunnery has commented "it's a very rhythmic instrument. And you can always see exactly what you're doing, you can work the patterns out. The things you do are totally different from what you can do on a guitar. You can hit two notes together at either end of the fretboard, you can stagger notes, like you're playing a piano, and play 'impossible' scales."

The Tapboard is also infamous for featuring a chrome shower hose (which travels from one end of the instrument to the other) with an egg-timer at one end. Both of these initially appeared to have been added as a joke and for decoration, reflecting the eccentric nature of the instrument and Dunnery's ambivalent relationship with the more ludicrous aspects of rock performance. (Dunnery fostered this impression by joking that the feature was added "to see how fast I'm going – eight thousand notes in the time it takes to boil an egg"). However, in 2009 Farmiloe revealed that the shower hose "actually provided the solution for cable routing, some electrical shielding and the ability to mess with the wiring without taking the thing apart", although he did confess that "the egg timer was added last to help Francis boil a perfect egg for an It Bites breakfast!"

=== Use ===
The Tapboard was used on several It Bites tours from 1989 to 1990, and made an appearance at the It Bites convention in London in late 1989. On record it was used on It Bites' Eat Me in St Louis album in 1989 (on the outro for "Leaving Without You" and the instrumental "Charlie"), and on two single B-sides during the same period ("Having A Good Day" and "Reprise").

The Tapboard was never produced commercially, and only one example of the instrument exists. Despite initial intentions, Dunnery did not use it for either recordings and concerts after 1990 as by then he was moving towards simpler composition and playing styles. However, he retained the instrument and claimed to have begun using it again while recording his 2005 album The Gulley Flats Boys (although there is no aural evidence of its use on the final release and it is not mentioned in the album credits). Some fans claim that the Tapboard can be heard being used on the song "I'm in Love" from Dunnery's 2001 album Man, four years previously.

Dunnery began using the Tapboard again as a live instrument on his 2009 New Progressives tour, commenting "I don't think I ever fully utilized the true potential of the instrument, so I'm having another go twenty years later. I'm going to break the guitar land speed record and will be performing some of the Tapboard classics as well as some new material!" During the tour, he played a version of the 1989 It Bites track "Charlie", which he had also re-recorded for his 2009 album It's a Whole New World Out There.

== Szendofi Tapboard ==
Another Tapboard instrument is played by Hungarian progressive rock/jazz-fusion bassist Balazs Szendofi (Regina Rostás Quintet, Mindflowers, The Piccolo Inn, The Holdudvar, The Self-Searching System and others). During his time with Mindflower, Szendofi sometimes played a "Szendofi 12-string Grand Tapboard", which he describes as a "custom creation" designed by his own father Attila Szendofi. The instrument is also sometimes referred to as the "Xu Tap Thing 12". Szendofi's Tapboard playing can be heard on Mindflowers' Nuances album (2005). It's not known whether there is any connection between the Szendofi and Dunnery Tapboards.
