= John Mitchell (musician) =

Irish musician (born 1973)

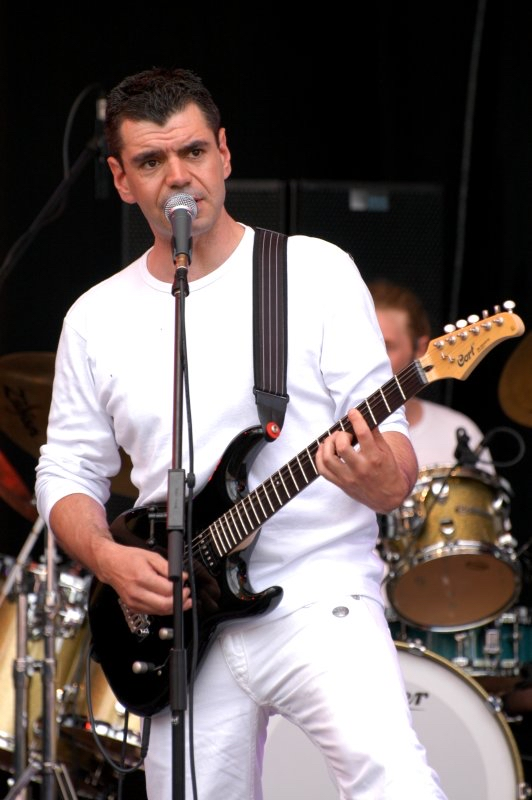
- Mitchell at The Lorelei Prog Festival

Background information
- Born: 21 June 1973 (age 53); Shannon, County Clare, Ireland
- Genre: Progressive rock
- Occupations: Musician; record producer; songwriter
- Instruments: Guitar; vocals; bass
- Member of: It Bites; Arena; Frost*; Kino; Lonely Robot; Asia
- Formerly of: A; The Urbane
- Website: johnmitchellhq.com

John Mitchell (born 21 June 1973) is an Irish musician and record producer. He primarily plays guitar and has been a member of the bands It Bites, Arena, Frost*, Kino, A, The Urbane, and Asia, as well as pursuing a solo career with the Lonely Robot project.

== Early life and career ==
Mitchell describes seeing Eric Clapton perform the song "Miss You" from his 1986 album August at a Prince's Trust concert as "the single defining moment that made me decide to put down the violin and pick up a guitar".

Influenced by guitarists such as Jeff Beck, Trevor Rabin and David Gilmour, Mitchell mainly sings and plays guitar, but is also a multi-instrumentalist. He was the second frontman for British prog-pop band It Bites (having replaced original singer and guitarist Francis Dunnery in 2006).

He was releasing records and touring with his solo project Lonely Robot, whose debut album Please Come Home was released on 23 February 2015 and featured a number of guest artists including Peter Cox, Steve Hogarth, Jem Godfrey, Nik Kershaw, and British actor Lee Ingleby. A second album, The Big Dream, was released in April 2017; a third, Under Stars, followed in April 2019. A final Lonely Robot album came in 2026.

Mitchell has also played guitar for a number of other progressive rock bands including Arena, The Urbane, Kino, Frost*, and the John Wetton band. In 2008, Mitchell was drafted in to join A, playing bass in place of original bass player Daniel P. Carter to support The Wildhearts on their December UK tour, as well as a 10-date headline tour in 2009. In 2012, Mitchell toured with Martin Barre in his band New Day, singing lead vocals on many songs originally by Jethro Tull.

In 2024, Mitchell joined Asia on guitar. He has toured with the band since then and appeared on the live album Live in England and the studio album Indigo in 2026. He mixed and mastered Indigo.

Mitchell is also a record producer and sound engineer at Outhouse Studios, a recording studio in Reading, UK, where he has recorded and produced music for a number of rock bands including Enter Shikari, You Me at Six, Lower Than Atlantis, Architects, The Blackout, Kids in Glass Houses, Funeral for a Friend, My Passion, Exit Ten, I Divide, Ivyrise, Anavae, Touchstone, Your Demise and You and What Army.

Mitchell is also the co-owner and co-founder of White Star Records, an independent record label which focuses on prog rock artists. Mitchell released an EP under his own name, The Nostalgia Factory, on White Star Records in 2016.

== Discography ==
=== with The Urbane ===
- Neon (1999)
- Glitter (2003)

=== with Arena ===
- The Cry (1997 - EP)
- Welcome to the Stage (1997 - live)
- The Visitor (1998)
- Immortal? (2000)
- Breakfast in Biarritz (2001 - live)
- Contagion (2003)
- Contagious (2003 - EP)
- Contagium' (2003 - EP)
- Live & Life (2004 - live)
- Pepper's Ghost (2005)
- Ten Years On (2006 - compilation)
- The Seventh Degree Of Separation (2011)
- Contagion Max (2014)
- The Unquiet Sky (2015)
- Double Vision (2018)
- The Theory of Molecular Inheritance (2022)

=== with Kino ===
- Picture (2005)
- Cutting Room Floor (2005 - compilation)
- Radio Voltaire (2018)

=== with Frost* ===
- Milliontown (2006)
- Experiments in Mass Appeal (2008)
- FrostFest Live CD (2009)
- The Philadelphia Experiment (2010 - live)
- The Rockfield Files (2013 - DVD)
- Falling Satellites (2016)
- Day and Age (2021)
- Island Live (2023)
- Life In The Wires (2024)

=== with Blind Ego ===
- Mirror (2007)

=== with Flash Range ===
- On The Way (2007)

=== with John Wetton ===
- Amorata (2009) (METAL MIN2)

=== with It Bites ===
- When The Lights Go Down (2007 - live)
- The Tall Ships (2008)
- This Is Japan (2010 - live)
- It Happened One Night (2011 - live)
- Map of the Past (2012)

=== with Gandalf's Fist ===
- A Forest of Fey (2014)

=== with Lonely Robot ===
- Please Come Home (2015)
- The Big Dream (2017)
- Under Stars (2019)
- Feelings Are Good (2020)
- A Model Life (2022)
- An Ending (2026)

=== with Legacy Pilots ===
- Con Brio (2018)
- Aviation (2020)
- The Penrose Triangle (2021)
- Thru The Lens (2024)

=== with The Kite Experiment ===
- Atmospherics (2021 - EP)

=== with Karmakanic ===
- Transmutation (2025)

=== Solo ===
- The Nostalgia Factory (2016 - EP)

== Equipment ==
Mitchell primarily uses Cort Guitars – white and black G254s on stage, and for recording, a tobacco G210 and a blue/black G290. He also plays an Alvarez Yairi acoustic guitar in the studio, and a PRS Classic. Mitchell's rack set-up consists of a Marshall JMP1 Preamp with effects being produced by a vintage Korg A3 effects unit. This signal is then amplified by a Marshall Valvestate 80/80 power amp to a 4x12 Marshall cab.

Mitchell has since used a Boss GT1000 ran directly into the PA system; this can be seen on photos during the Arena tours.
