= Necromandus =

English rock band

- Origin: Egremont, Cumbria, England
- Genres: Hard rock; heavy metal
- Years active: 1970–1973; 2016–present
- Label: Vertigo
- Members: John Marcangelo; Frank Hall; Banjo Cunanan; Dean Newton; John Branch
- Past members: Barry Dunnery; Dennis McCarten; Bill Branch

Necromandus are an English rock band from Egremont, Cumberland, England. They were formed in 1970 and were discovered by Tony Iommi of Black Sabbath in 1972. After recording one album in 1973, they split up. The album was not released until 1999.

== History ==
In 1968, two West Cumbrian bands, Jug and Heaven, broke up. Members from both bands, Barry "Baz" Dunnery (lead guitar), Dennis McCarten (bass), Frank Hall (drums), and singer Bill Branch, formed a heavy progressive blues outfit they called Hot Spring Water. They were briefly renamed Taurus before settling on Necromandus after a radio show asked their audience for name suggestions.

In 1972, after extensive gigging and a failure to release a record, they caught the ear of Black Sabbath guitarist Tony Iommi, who began managing the group.

In early 1973, Necromandus, under Iommi's guidance, recorded the album Orexis of Death at London's Morgan Studio. Iommi also added some guitar to the title track. A deal was arranged with Vertigo and the band began opening for Sabbath as well as Tony Kaye's Badger. Dunnery left the band in 1973, and as a result the album was shelved by Vertigo. Necromandus continued to receive praise and support, with Ozzy Osbourne initially wanting Necromandus's guitarist, bassist and drummer for his Blizzard of Ozz project. Dennis McCarten, Barry Dunnery, and Frank Hall were in fact the Original Blizzard Of Ozz with Osbourne in 1977.

Dunnery and Hall founded the cover band Nerves, with Dunnery leaving to join the ELO offshoot Violinski in 1976. Dunnery and Hall also played together in the new wave of British heavy metal band Hammerhead, although Dunnery's stint was brief.

The only surviving member of the original lineup of Necromandus is Frank Hall: Dennis McCarten died of a kidney illness in December 2004 at the age of 54, and Barry Dunnery (the elder brother of Francis Dunnery) died of cancer on 29 May 2008 at the age of 56. Bill Branch died in June 1995 at the age of 45.

In 2016 the band was reformed with a new line-up to record a new album, based on recordings the band made in 1975. It was released in 2017.

== Style ==
Hailing the band as "the second Sabbath" but with a prog edge, Melody Maker called Necromandus "a sort of Black Sabbath play Yes' greatest hits". The band's music has been classified as hard rock, heavy metal, proto-metal, progressive blues, doom metal art rock, folk jazz and progressive rock.

== Line-up ==
=== Current members ===
- John Branch – vocals (2016–present)
- Dean Newton – guitar (2016–present)
- Paul Spedding – bass (2017–present)
- John Marcangelo – keyboards (2016–present)
- Frank Hall – drums (1970–1973, 2016–present)

=== Former members ===
- Bill Branch – vocals (1970–1973; died 1995)
- Barry Dunnery – guitar (1970–1973; died 2008)
- Dennis McCarten – bass (1970–1973; died 2004)

== Discography ==
- Quicksand Dream (1991, alternative version of Orexis of Death)
- Orexis of Death (1999, recorded 1973)
- Necrothology (best of, 2005)
- Live (2005)
- Orexis of Death Plus... (reissue, 2005)
- Orexis of Death / Live (reissue, 2010)
- Necromandus (2017)

== Bibliography ==
- Christe, Ian (2003). Sound of the Beast: The Complete Headbanging History of Heavy Metal. HarperCollins. ISBN 0-380-81127-8
