= Francis Dunnery =

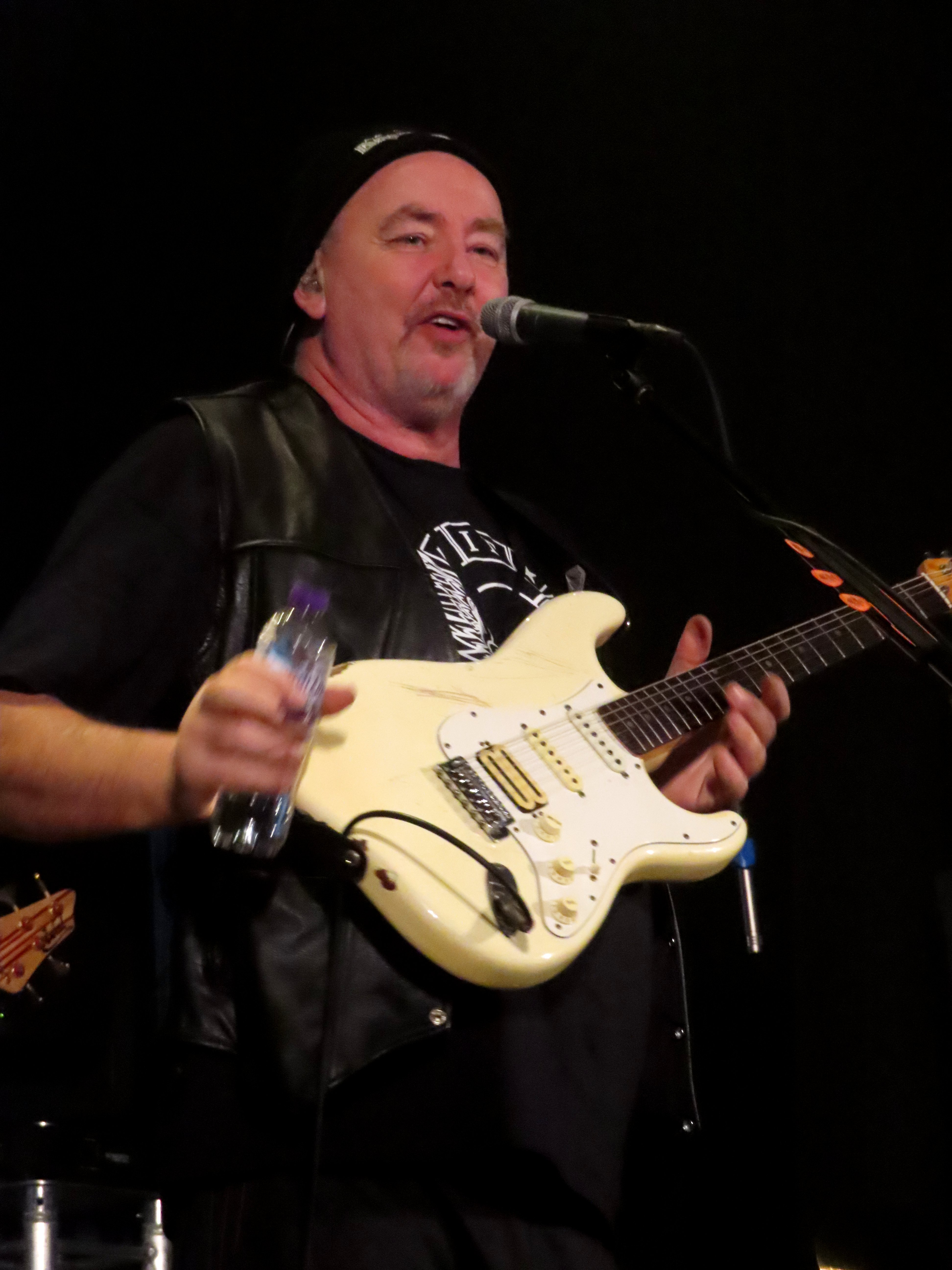
- Dunnery performing in 2024

Background information
- Born: 25 December 1962 (age 63)
- Origin: Egremont, Cumbria, England
- Genres: Pop; rock; progressive rock; acoustic rock; R&B
- Occupations: Musician; record producer
- Instruments: Vocals; guitar; bass guitar; drums; keyboards; tapboard; programming
- Years active: 1984–present
- Label: Aquarian Nation
- Website: Official website

Francis Dunnery (born 25 December 1962) is an English musician, singer-songwriter, record producer and record label owner.

Dunnery was the lead singer and guitarist for British prog-pop band It Bites between 1982 and 1990. Since 1990 he has pursued a solo career, and has owned and run his own record label, Aquarian Nation, since 2001.

He has collaborated with artists including Robert Plant, Ian Brown, Lauryn Hill, Santana and Anderson Bruford Wakeman Howe and as a producer and/or collaborator with David Sancious, Chris Difford (of Squeeze), James Sonefeld (Hootie and the Blowfish), Erin Moran, Steven Harris (ex-The Cult, Zodiac Mindwarp and the Love Reaction), and Ashley Reaks (Younger Younger 28s).

Dunnery was one of the candidates invited to audition as a lead singer and frontman for Genesis following Phil Collins' departure in 1996. He also played in the reformed 1960s beat/prog band The Syn between 2008 and mid-2009.

== Early life ==
Francis Dunnery grew up as part of a working-class musical family in the small Cumberland town of Egremont (at 28 Queens Drive on the Gulley Flats estate). He is the younger son of Charlie Dunnery (a former member of the Jimmy Shand band) and his wife, Kathleen.

He displayed an interest in music from an early age, with his mother later recalling that "he was always drumming with his hands. Asking him what he wanted for his tea, he'd be drumming on something the whole time." His elder brother Barry "Baz" Dunnery (whom Dunnery cites as his greatest single influence) was a guitarist with heavy rock band Necromandus and subsequently Ozzy Osbourne's first post-Black Sabbath band and the ELO-spinoff Violinski.

"The only thing that was ever permanent in my life was my Genesis collection. When things got weird at home and the alcohol cycle was in full rotation, I could return to that little piece of upper class England where Peter Gabriel and his boys were playing croquet on the lawn, eating cucumber sandwiches and deciding which one of their country cottages they would visit next. Still to this day, old Peter can soothe my anxiety faster than Eckhart Tolle... My Genesis albums were my security."

— Francis Dunnery on the inspiration he found in the music of Genesis

Dunnery has described his family home as having been like "a bustling café" full of musicians and family friends of all generations, and recalls "my Mam and Dad were the greatest. They were kind, funny and gracious in a working class way. They were giving people. They had a way about them that made everyone feel welcome in our home... My Mam and Dad would feed them great food, share cigarettes and partake in humorous and interesting conversation."

His childhood was blighted by his parents' mutual alcoholism. He described them as "binge drinkers, two weeks on and two months off... Once my Mam and Dad started drinking alcohol I never knew what was going to happen. Everything seems to happen fast. One minute it was paradise and the next minute it was sheer hell. It was horrific. ... Anyone who has lived under this nervousness will know exactly what I mean. I lived under this constant threat all my life."

From the age of eleven, Frank spent four days a week living by himself on a trailer park to avoid problems at home, going to school during the day and bolstering his independence and living expenses by working as a musician at night. His first professional work was as half of an early teens duo with his friend Peter Lockhart which played local venues including the Tarnside Caravan Club and various cabaret venues. He recalls "we were the cute little duo that would open up for the main act... I would just bash along as Peter sang Elvis songs and played the organ." Adding guitar and singing to his musical skills, Dunnery moved on to other projects of varying levels of commitment – "I played in a few local bands and with lots of different musicians, especially a group called Waving at Trains I was in with Don Mackay, who is a fantastic musician. He wrote some really good songs, too." Waving at Trains featured Mackay as frontman, Dunnery on lead guitar and vocals, and Glyn Davies and Frank Hall on bass guitar and drums respectively (both of the latter having also played in bands with Frank's brother Barry, including Necromandus and Nerves).

Regarding this period, Dunnery commented "There was no one I could rely on... I somehow made sure that I had other places to live and spend my time (talk about the power of the human spirit) because I couldn't bear to be at home when my parents were drinking. I can still remember the smell of the house when my parents were drowning in hops. To this day the smell of Carlsberg Special Brew makes me want to vomit."

== Career ==
=== 1982–1990: It Bites ===
In 1982, when he was nineteen, Dunnery formed the rock band It Bites (taking the role of lead singer and guitarist). The other members of the band were his Egremont school friends Bob Dalton (drums, vocals) and Dick Nolan (bass, vocals); plus John Beck (keyboards, vocals) who came from Mirehouse, a suburb of Whitehaven. Following a career playing the pub and youth club circuit the band temporarily split, with Dunnery moving to London. The band reformed when Dunnery convinced the other members to leave Egremont entirely and relocate to London in 1984. The quartet squatted a house in Peckham and wrote and rehearsed every day, eventually signing a record contract with Virgin Records.

It Bites released three studio albums, the debut The Big Lad in the Windmill (1986), the critically-acclaimed Once Around the World (1988) and the rock-oriented Eat Me in St Louis (1989). There were three singles from each album, with the biggest hit being "Calling All The Heroes" in 1986. This was the second single from The Big Lad in the Windmill and reached No. 6 in the UK Singles Chart after extensive radio play and TV coverage. The band gained a very loyal cult following due to the exceptional Once Around The World album and, arguably, their career peaked with a rapturous show at the Astoria in London in May 1988 to promote it. It Bites split up in mid-1990 on the eve of recording their fourth studio album in Los Angeles.

Commenting on the breakup, Dunnery said: "the band had come to the end. It was a natural process. We fell out over a few things, there wasn't one big issue or problem, it was daft little things. We had just drifted apart. It wasn't anyone's fault, but we split." In 2024, however, he recalled:

There are a million different answers I could give you. We were under a lot of pressure to come up with huge success when nobody really knew what we should be doing. All we were being told was: "No, that's not right," or, "No, you can't do that." Towards the end of It Bites there was a lot of trying to make the sun shine when it was raining. It became obvious that we just didn't fit into what was going on within the industry. Nobody wanted us. It was like being English in a Welsh bar. The most profound thing was realising that it didn’t matter the kind of music we were making. The music side of things was the least important. That was the saddest thing. Walking away from all of that felt very liberating. I've got a brash personality and that didn’t help. I was still drinking and I didn't have very good social skills. I was too much of a live wire and in that sense I contributed to my own downfall.

Following Dunnery's departure, It Bites briefly continued with a new frontman (Lee Knott) and a succession of new names (including Navajo Kiss and Sister Sarah) but split up after failing to sign a new recording deal. A post-breakup It Bites live album (drawn mainly from 1989 concerts) called "Thank You and Goodnight," was released in 1991.

=== 1990–1995: Los Angeles and London ===
"The last night I drank I had a gun put to my head and I was smoking crack on Hollywood Boulevard, out of my brains on whiskey, crack and crystal meth. It scared the living shit out of me. That was the moment in my life where I went, 'Something's gotta change.'"

— Francis Dunnery on quitting alcohol and drug abuse

Following the 1990 break-up of It Bites, Dunnery moved to Los Angeles, indulging what he later acknowledged to be a disastrously hedonistic lifestyle. During this period he recorded his first solo album, Welcome to the Wild Country, which was released on Virgin Records in 1991 and produced by David Hentschel. The record enjoyed little success and was released only in Japan. He regained the rights in 2001, re-issuing it on Aquarian Nation Records.

Dunnery has since described Welcome to the Wild Country as "having been recorded at a time when I didn't know who I was". Towards the end of his time in Los Angeles, Dunnery addressed his drugs and alcohol problems and cleaned up his lifestyle. He has subsequently been open about his problems with alcohol addiction and drug abuse during this period.

In 1993, Dunnery returned to the UK and joined Led Zeppelin singer Robert Plant's live band, performing on several tracks on Plant's 1993 album Fate of Nations and on the accompanying world tour. Regarding this period, Dunnery has commented. "I have a good relationship with (Plant) because I think I’m as spunky and aggressive as he’d like to be... He likes the way I go at [the instrument], so we always get on well. In those two or three years we spent together I got to do things I could never have done otherwise. Staying in big hotels, playing massive stadiums and flying first class, I went to the top of the hill. At that time it was the biggest guitar job in the world and for a while it was mine. It made me feel complete... I didn't apply for that job, which made me realise that I’m not very effective at strategies. I see others making plans and going from A to B and it makes me think, "Wow!" In my life I tend to get blown around in the wind, I end up in the most fantastic places that nobody could even imagine. I didn't want the job with Robert, I wasn't after it and there were five thousand guys that were, but they called me up and that was it. When things come into your life, embrace them, and when they leave, let them go – simple." Dunnery has also credited his time with Plant as "(giving) me an education in the blues".

Dunnery then released Fearless on Atlantic Records in 1994, promoting the album with his first solo tour of the UK. The Glasgow date of the tour was recorded for a live album, One Night in Sauchiehall Street, released in 1995.

=== 1995–1999: New York and Vermont ===
In 1995, Dunnery relocated to New York City. His third studio album, Tall Blonde Helicopter, was released on Atlantic that year.

"I try everything and the number of times I fail is unreal, but I never ever let it beat me and I try something else. People might look at me and say that I am successful, but that is just because I try so many different things. Someone once said to me that Americans are not Americans because they are born there, being an American is a state of mind. It is the need to expand and grow, to explore, basically a pioneering spirit ... I think I have that, the American mindset."

— Francis Dunnery

In 1996, Dunnery was approached to audition as lead singer for Genesis (although the position ultimately went to Ray Wilson). Dunnery has reminisced "I did audition for them, though I knew I wouldn’t get the job. I can sing Peter Gabriel better than Peter Gabriel, but I just can’t do Phil Collins... all that screaming on "Mama", no way. Singing Genesis is all about the phrasing; you don’t add blues because it’s like classical music. So I knew I wouldn’t get it, but I wasn’t about to turn down the chance to go to Genesis' studio, sit there and sing "The Lamb Lies Down on Broadway". And you know what? I believe I was the best man for the job because I'm creative enough to make Tony Banks angry... I wouldn't back down to any of those guys because I'm incredibly creative, probably more than they are."

Dunnery's next album, Let's Go Do What Happens, was released in 1998 on Razor and Tie Records, initially only in the United States. During this period, Dunnery also played on Lauryn Hill's 1998 debut album The Miseducation of Lauryn Hill, and Carlos Santana's 1999 album Supernatural.

"I don't feel fulfilled by just doing music; I have other sides of my nature that I need to express. It's very damaging not to express yourself, so I like to keep my life full and diverse."

— Francis Dunnery

Dunnery went into semi-retirement as a musician later in 1998 and set up a new home in the Vermont mountains where he devoted the next few years to breeding and training horses (for which he studied under John Lyons, the "horse whisperer") as well as carpentry, astrology, and Jungian psychology.

=== 2000–2003: Return to music ===
In 2000, inspired by watching a televised Shakti concert, Dunnery later admitted he "realised there was still a musician in me, and that I had to be as true to that side of my character as I was being to the other sides." He decided to re-engage with the music business by returning to the UK for the first time in five years to play a few concerts, and by creating his own internet-based record label, Aquarian Nation, with the intention of releasing his future albums as well as albums by other artists.

For the UK tour, Dunnery formed a new backing band called The Grass Virgins, featuring second guitarist Dave Colquhoun, bass guitarist Matt Pegg, and singer/keyboard player Erin Moran, followed soon afterwards by a larger tour and support slots with Hootie and the Blowfish.

Dunnery's first new album following his comeback was Man, released in 2001. On the album, Dunnery said: "I was very depressed when I wrote the 'Man' CD. It was a difficult birth. I was going through such turmoil in my life. My mother was dying, my relationship was ending, and in complete contrast, my daughter Ava was being born. [But] I think I'm at peace with that side of my life now." Dunnery toured the UK to promote Man, accompanied by Matt Pegg on bass guitar. A live album – Hometown 2001 – was recorded 14 June 2001 at the Whitehaven Civic Hall in Cumbria and released later the same year.

During 2002, Dunnery played on and produced several albums released on Aquarian Nation. The first of these releases was Chris Difford's I Didn't Get Where I Am, with whom Dunnery also toured to promote the album. This was followed by John & Wayne's debut Nearly Killed Keith, and Songs From the Mission of Hope, the debut album by Stephen Harris.

In 2003, Dunnery performed with fellow former It Bites members John Beck, Dick Nolan and Bob Dalton at the Union Chapel during the headline slot of an Aquarian Nation showcase. Dunnery and Beck performed 'Hunting The Whale' and Nolan and Dalton then joined them for 'Still Too Young To Remember'. The event was recorded and released on DVD as Live at the Union Chapel the following year.

=== 2004–2007 ===
In 2005, Dunnery released The Gulley Flats Boys, a more sedate and acoustic album than its predecessor, featuring next to no drum or percussion parts and sparse use of electric guitar. It was recorded by Dunnery with piano/keyboard player David Sancious and Dorie Jackson on backing vocals.

"(The house concerts) give the incredible feeling of being heard. For an artist – in fact, for every human being – it's an incredible and fabulous feeling to sense that someone really heard what you said or played... During the house concerts there's the intimacy of one man with an acoustic guitar, talking to people about philosophical things. You can't really get into people's souls like that if they've had a pint of beer and are standing screaming at a rock god."

— Francis Dunnery on playing house concerts

In 2005, Dunnery embarked on a "house concert" world tour, suggesting to fans that they book him to perform in their own homes for a paying audience, in a drug and alcohol-free environment. Dunnery continues to perform house concerts to this day.

During the same year Dunnery was recruited into Steve Nardelli's revived 1960s progressive rock/beat band The Syn as guitarist, playing alongside Nardelli, Yes bassist Chris Squire, keyboard player Gerard Johnson and drummer Gary Husband. This lineup was scheduled to play as part of the More Drama Tour of summer and autumn 2005 (alongside two other Yes-related acts, White and Steve Howe). Dunnery left the band after the cancellation of the tour, and was replaced by Shane Theriot.

In October 2007 Dunnery released a free download of Feels Like Summertime, a song which had initially been written for It Bites shortly before the band's original split in 1990 and was reworked as part of the unsuccessful 2003 reunion.

=== 2008–2011 ===
In 2008, Dunnery performed numerous solo performances and house concerts, this time centred on material from Tall Blonde Helicopter. His summer and fall schedule included a full-band tour, culminating in a performance in Seattle which was recorded by Flying Spot, Inc. for subsequent release as a special edition concert/documentary DVD. (Originally scheduled for a 2009 release and titled Louder Than Usual, this was finally released in September 2010 as a DVD with accompanying CD)

In 2010, Dunnery released an "official video bootleg" DVD from the 2001 Man tour, titled In The Garden of Mystic Lovers, and produced and played on Snowman Melting, the first solo album by James Sonefeld of Hootie and the Blowfish.

In 2008, Dunnery rejoined The Syn as part of a new line-up also featuring Nardelli and keyboard player Tom Brislin. Joined by Dorie Jackson, bass player Jamie Bishop and (as well as by two members of American progressive rock band Echolyn, guitarist Brett Kull and drummer Paul Ramsey) the band recorded a new album, Big Sky, released early 2009, which was voted the best progressive rock album of 2009 at USA Progressive Music website. Although he didn't play on the Syn's "Reason and Ritual" single of October 2008, Dunnery was in the band for the US tour scheduled for spring 2009. Unfortunately, the tour was cancelled after six dates following Nardelli's return to the UK to pursue separate interests, with the band breaking up acrimoniously as a result after a final performance at Rosfest on 1 May 2009, recorded and eventually released as The Syn Live Rosfest in 2015. Brett Kull would dismiss the project as having "bad organization, bad mojo, bad energy."

Despite the Syn debacle, all members of the line-up (bar Nardelli) would continue to work with Dunnery. Kull, Brislin, Ramsey, Bishop and Jackson all appeared on Dunnery's next album There's a Whole New World Out There (released on 3 October 2009) as part of his new group The New Progressives. Consisting of reworkings of It Bites and solo songs from across Dunnery's career (plus covers of songs by Robert Plant, Genesis, David Sylvian and Joy Division) the album also featured guest appearances from guitarists Phil Campbell (Motörhead), Simon Rogers (Also Eden) and Luke Machin (Maschine, The Tangent), flute player Theo Travis (Soft Machine, Gong, The Tangent) and – perhaps most surprisingly – Dunnery's own replacement in It Bites, John Mitchell. The New Progressives toured the UK, American and Australia to promote the record, with various guests (from both on and off the record) appearing when available.

In 2009, Jem Godfrey (Frost*) announced on the Frost* Forum that he and Dunnery had both contributed solos to the title track of Big Big Train's upcoming album, The Underfall Yard.

=== 2011–2017 ===
On 12 August 2011 Dunnery released the contemporary R'n'B-influenced Made in Space. He supported the album with a tour of the UK, which featured himself and Dorie Jackson. He also announced that he would be recording a cover version of Peter Gabriel's The Rhythm of the Heat as part of Sonic Elements, a new "fantasy rock" band put together by Dave Kerzner.

In 2012 Dunnery made a guest appearance on Steve Hackett's album Genesis Revisited II, singing on two tracks – "Dancing With the Moonlit Knight" and "Supper's Ready" (the "As Sure As Eggs Is Eggs (Aching Men's Feet)" section) – as well as contributing additional guitar. Dunnery also made a guest appearance on Hackett's subsequent Genesis Revisited tour, singing at the Arcada Theater show in St Charles, Illinois on 20 September 2013, and at the Scottish Rites Auditorium in Collingswood, New Jersey.

From late 2012 to autumn 2013 Dunnery recorded Frankenstein Monster, a covers album featuring songs from his brother's former band Necromandus. Regarding the album, Dunnery commented: "I must say that this has been one hell of a journey both emotionally and musically. I learned so much about my brother during the making of this album and so much about myself ... Listening back now as it comes into focus I am very pleased and proud of the results. We have kept very close to the originals, sometimes exact and where it need a little more musicality or space we were smart enough to add our own parts without ruining the song. I know exactly what Baz would have liked so I only added things I know he would have liked."

In late 2013, Dunnery put together The Sensational Francis Dunnery Electric Band, which toured both Necromandus songs and songs from the Francis Dunnery back catalogue. The band also featured on Dunnery's 2016 release Vampires, an album of re-recorded It Bites songs.

In January 2016, Dunnery began broadcasting "The Francis Dunnery Radio Show" on British progressive rock radio station Progzilla Radio.

In February 2016 Dunnery released Vampires, the follow-up to There's a Whole New World Out There. Like its predecessor, Vampires focused on material originally by It Bites – though rather than completely reworking the songs this album featured faithful arrangements recorded using smoother production (which Dunnery now favoured) than the original It Bites recordings. The album was also released as an instrumental-only version.

In July 2016 Dunnery continued his tendency to rework, remix and re-release with Return to the Wild Country, a re-recording of 1990's Welcome to the Wild Country solo debut. This was followed in March 2017 by Whole New World (a remix of There's a Whole New World Out There) and a remix of Frankenstein Monster in May 2017.

=== 2018–present ===
In November 2021, Dunnery released his first album of fully original material for eleven years. The Big Purple Castle was a download-only triple album with songs and audio snippets reflecting on Dunnery's past, his life in the music industry and his current philosophies. The three cover images of the album feature individual portraits of Dunnery, his daughter Elsie and son Frankie.

In January 2022, Dunnery released the "winter remix" of The Gulley Flats Boys in both vocal/instrumental and instrumental-only form. The mix featured new overdubs (bass guitar) and an improved sound to the original release, giving the songs "a new life, a new spring in their step" (according to Dunnery on his Bandcamp page). In July 2022, he released Tall Blonde Helicopter Live, a remastered audio-only version of the live footage from the Louder than Usual DVD, featuring a band with Brett Kull, Paul Ramsey and Jamie Bishop from his Syn/New Progressives era plus Erica Brilhart on keyboards.

Wanting to challenge himself to alter his musical approach and find new dimensions to his guitar playing, Dunnery's next new project was a blues band and the touring and recording of a collection of original blues songs. The Blues of Tombstone Dunnery Volume 1 was released on 17 October 2023. The Tombstone Dunnery band featured Paul Brown on bass guitar, Quint Starkie on rhythm guitar, Phil Beaumont on drums, Nigel Hopkins on keyboards, Neil Yates on brass and woodwind, and Deanne Blazey on backing vocals. Prior to the tour, Dunnery commented "I can't wait to just play with this band and play traditional blues. I can sit back and just be the musician. I've teamed up with some amazing musicians for the tour and the album. I just love B. B. King, and his guitar playing is emotive, and from one note, a story can be told."

During this period, Dunnery had also begun to revisit the music of It Bites more vigorously. He carried out a British tour with a band he referred to as "Francis Dunnery's It Bites", performing the original band's material. In addition to Dunnery, the band featured Brown, Quint Starkie (in a multi-instrumentalist role), second guitarist Luke Machin, keyboardist/singer Pete Jones and drummer Björn Fryklund. Following the band's UK tour in January 2023, Dunnery renamed from "Francis Dunnery's It Bites" to the more straightforward "It Bites FD". In September 2023, the double live album Live from the Black Country was released (recorded in Wolverhampton during January of the same year); copies of the Blu-ray edition came with a bonus EP called Raw, which featured acoustic versions of three vintage It Bites tracks with all of the instruments performed by Dunnery.

In December 2023, Dunnery announced a new line-up of It Bites FD (himself, Brown, keyboard player Tony Turrell, drummer Chad Wackerman and "atmospherics" player Dave McCracken). A short three-date UK tour in January 2024 was quickly followed by the release of a studio album called Return to Natural, which had been recorded at the famous Rockfield Studios near Monmouth over a few days in mid-December 2023. In the first couple of months following the album release, seemingly unsatisfied with the original version Dunnery remixed Return to Natural (twice) and issued these mixes for download from his Bandcamp page (alongside an instrumental version of the album). Live And Natural, a film and audio recording of a gig from the January 2024 tour, was released in a blu ray / CD package early in 2025. Bonus content included a 90-minute documentary looking behind the scenes of the making of Return To Natural.

In December 2025, Dunnery announced the release of a new solo album, called England's Tales of the Council House Kid, due for release on 15 January 2026.

== Musical style ==
"When I heard John McLaughlin on fire, I wanted to be on fire like that. When I heard Allan Holdsworth, I could hear a different approach and wanted to know what he was doing. I once saw Shakti on a TV show in the '70s, and these guys played themselves into a fucking frenzy and the molecules were jumping around. It was always that kind of stuff that excited me about music ... Later in It Bites, we were criticised for being virtuosos, but I was silly enough to think that I could change people's opinions about musicianship. I thought I could get everyone to listen to Soft Machine, Yes, Focus and Pink Floyd. And I badmouthed bands like The Smiths, saying that they couldn't play!"

— Francis Dunnery on early musical influences,

Dunnery's musical approach is diverse. His early musical influences were progressive rock (with Genesis being a particular inspiration) and jazz-rock fusion musicians including John McLaughlin, Soft Machine, Focus, Return to Forever and Jeff Beck.

His aggressive and dramatic playing style merges hard rock, pop and funk stylings with a fluid, spiralling hammer-on lead-guitar technique inspired by Allan Holdsworth. This was particularly prominent while he was with It Bites, and he has criticised his lead guitar approach at that time as having been immature. He has also incorporated elements of jazz, classical and country fingerpicking into his style.

On his songwriting, Dunnery has said: "I cannot write songs on a nine-to-five basis. At the risk of sounding pretentious, my songs come from somewhere else and I have to wait for them, so it's not up to me when I receive them. When the songs start to come, they all come at the same time. I may get 20 songs in three to four days and then it all stops again."

"If rap stars can go on about the drug dealer on 73rd Street in Compton then why can't I sing about Gulley Flatts or Thornhill? That is my history, I am as valid as they are. I love Cumbria, that is where my roots are. I sing about Wasdale and Murphy's pies, because that is part of my history."

— Francis Dunnery on letting his Cumbrian roots feed into his songwriting

Aside from singing and playing the guitar, Dunnery plays drums, bass guitar, organ, keyboards, percussion and tapboard (a guitar-related instrument).

== Personal life ==
Dunnery has a daughter from a relationship with Jackie O'Sullivan. He married American singer Julie Daniels (frontwoman of the rock band Star 69) on 8 December 1990 in Las Vegas, Nevada. He was later in a relationship with Helena Faccenda, with whom he had a daughter in 1999. Around 2004 he met his girlfriend Erica Brilhart. During their relationship they had two children.

Dunnery is a lifelong supporter of Celtic Football Club and often wears Celtic kits during his live performances.

== Charitable work ==
In 2002, Dunnery founded the Charlie and Kathleen Dunnery Children's Fund a volunteer-run fundraising charity based in his hometown of Egremont, and named in honour of his late parents. Explaining his reasons for setting up the charity, Dunnery has said "My mother was a wonderful woman... so this is my way of honouring her and my dad. A line in one of my songs is that the only thing you get to keep is what you give away – I like that idea. I think that by the time you are 40 if you aren't doing something to help others then you probably should be. People take all the time and I think it is nice to put something back."

The fund raises money for projects and activities supporting the health, wellness and educational needs of children and young people in the Egremont area. He continues to support the charity via regular concerts in Egremont as well as participation in and publicity for various sponsored events.

== Discography ==
=== Studio albums ===
- Welcome to the Wild Country - 1991 (Virgin) *
- Fearless - 1994 (Atlantic)
- Tall Blonde Helicopter - 1995 (Atlantic)
- Let's Go Do What Happens - 1998 (Razor & Tie)
- Man - 2001 (Aquarian Nation)
- The Gulley Flats Boys - 2005 (Aquarian Nation) *
- There's a Whole New World Out There - 2009 (Aquarian Nation) *
- Made in Space - 2011 (Aquarian Nation) *
- Frankenstein Monster - 2013 (Aquarian Nation) *
- Vampires - 2016 (Aquarian Nation) *
- The Big Purple Castle - 2021 (Aquarian Nation)
- The Blues Of Tombstone Dunnery - 2023 (Aquarian Nation)
- Return To Natural - 2024 (Aquarian Nation) *
- England's Tales Of The Council House Kid - 2026 (Aquarian Nation)

=== *Remixed albums ===
- Return to the Wild Country (Aquarian Nation) 2016
- There's a Whole New World Out There - Whole New World Remix (Aquarian Nation) 2017
- Frankenstein Monster - Remix (Aquarian Nation) 2017
- The Gulley Flats Boys – Winter Remix [Vocal Version] 2022
- The Gulley Flats Boys – Winter Remix [Instrumental Version] 2022
- Vampires - Instrumental (Aquarian Nation) 2022
- Return To Natural - Super Remix (Aquarian Nation) 2024
- Return To Natural - Instrumental (Aquarian Nation) 2024

=== EP's ===
- Raw (2023) (Three song EP of new It Bites re-recordings)

=== Live ===
- One Night in Sauchiehall Street (Cottage Industry 1995)
- Hometown 2001 (Aquarian Nation, 2001)
- Tall Blonde Helicopter Live (Aquarian Nation, 2022)
- Live From The Black Country (2023)
- Live And Natural (2025)

=== Singles ===
- "American Life in the Summertime" (Atlantic Records, 1994) UK #91 US Rock #38 AUS #18
- "What's He Gonna Say?" (Atlantic Records, 1995)
- "Homegrown" (Atlantic Records, 1995) Australia
- "Too Much Saturn" (Atlantic Records, 1995) USA/ UK Promo only
- "The Way Things Are" (Atlantic Records, 1995) USA Promo only
- "I Believe I Can Change My World" (Atlantic Records, 1996) Europe/ Australia
- "Spiritual" (Atlantic Records, 1996) US Promo only 12" US Dance #38
- "My Own Reality" (Razor & Tie, 1998) Promo only
- "Riding on the Back" (Razor & Tie, 1998) US Promo only
- "The Wounding & Healing of Men" (Aquarian Nation, 2003) US Promo only
- "Good Life" (Aquarian Nation, 2005) US Promo only

=== Video ===
- Live At The Union Chapel (Aquarian Nation, 2004, DVD)
- In The Garden Of Mystic Lovers (Aquarian Nation, 2008, DVD)
- Louder Than Usual (Aquarian Nation/Flying Spot Entertainment, 2010, DVD)
- Live From The Black Country (Magenta, 2023, Blu-ray)
- The Making Of Return To Natural (documentary filmed 2023, released 2025 on Live And Natural Blu-ray)
- Live And Natural (Magenta, 2025, Blu-ray)

=== Other appearances ===
==== as group member ====
- It Bites – The Big Lad in the Windmill (Virgin/Geffen, 1986)
- It Bites – Once Around the World (Virgin/Geffen, 1988)
- It Bites – Eat Me in St. Louis (Virgin/Geffen, 1989)
- It Bites – The It Bites Album (Virgin Japan, 1990 – compilation album)
- It Bites – Thankyou and Goodnight – Live (Virgin, 1991 – live album)
- It Bites – The Best of It Bites – Calling All the Heroes (EMI, 1995 – compilation album)
- It Bites – Live in Montreux (It Bites self-released, 2003 – live album)
- It Bites – Whole New World: The Virgin Albums 1986–1991 (Virgin, 2014 – box set)
- It Bites – Live in London (It Bites self-released, 2018 – live album)
- The Syn – Big Sky (Alliance Records, 2009)
- The Syn – The Syn Live Rosfest (Umbrello Records, 2015)

==== guest and session appearances ====
- Anderson Bruford Wakeman Howe – Anderson Bruford Wakeman Howe (1989, Arista Records) – backing vocals.
- Robert Plant – Fate of Nations (1993, Es Paranza) – rhythm guitar on 'Come into My Life, lead guitar on "Promised Land."
- Lauryn Hill – The Miseducation of Lauryn Hill (1998) – guitar on "Every Ghetto, Every City" & "Nothing Even Matters."
- Santana – Supernatural (1999) – rhythm guitar on "Do You Like The Way?"
- Ian Brown – Music of the Spheres (2001, Polydor Records) – guitars on all tracks, also co-wrote "El Mundo Pequeño."
- Big Big Train – The Underfall Yard (2009) – guest lead guitar on "The Underfall Yard."
- Steve Hackett – Genesis Revisited II (2012) – lead vocal songs "Supper's Ready", "Dancing with the Moonlit Knight."

==== as producer ====
- Chris Difford – I Didn't Get Where I Am (Aquarian Nation, 2002) – also co-wrote and played guitars and keyboards on all tracks.
- John & Wayne – Nearly Killed Keith (Aquarian Nation, 2002) – also co-wrote and played drums and organ on all tracks.
- Stephen Harris – Songs From The Mission of Hope (Aquarian Nation, 2002) – also co-wrote and played guitar, piano and Mellotron on all tracks.
- John Gilmour Smith – The Story We've Been Sold (Aquarian Nation, 2010) – also co-wrote, and sang on several tracks
