= John Beck (It Bites) =

- Born: 29 July 1961 (age 64)
- Origin: Whitehaven, Cumbria
- Occupations: Musician; multi-instrumentalist; vocalist; songwriter; composer
- Instruments: Keyboards; accordion; guitar; bass guitar; vocals
- Years active: 1970s–present
- Member of: It Bites; Kino
- Formerly of: Navajo Kiss; Sister Sarah

John Beck is an English musician and songwriter, best known for his role as a member of progressive rock/pop fusion band It Bites (who scored a number 6 hit in the UK singles chart in 1986 with 'Calling All the Heroes').

Beck is a multi-instrumentalist, playing keyboards, accordion, guitar, bass guitar and drums: he is also a singer (mainly of harmony vocals). Onstage and on record he almost entirely restricts himself to keyboards and vocals (although he has been known to play live rhythm guitar on performances of It Bites' 'Still Too Young to Remember').

Born and brought up in Whitehaven, Cumbria, Beck spent his early teen years as a country-and-western accordionist on the Cumbrian club circuit before becoming a founder member of It Bites alongside guitarist and lead vocalist Francis Dunnery, bass guitarist Dick Nolan and drummer Bob Dalton. Beck was also a member of Navajo Kiss and Sister Sarah, the two short-lived groups formed by the remaining It Bites members following the 1990 departure of Dunnery (and for which Beck switched entirely from keyboards to guitar). Beck rejoined It Bites for the band's reformation in 2006. Along with Dalton, Beck is one of the two remaining original members of the group as well as being one of its main composers.

Beck has also been a member of Unicorn Jones (a post-It Bites trio of himself, Dick Nolan and singer David Banks which released the album A Hundred Thousand Million Stars in 1996) and of British prog-rock supergroup Kino (featuring Marillion bassist Pete Trewavas, former Porcupine Tree drummer Chris Maitland (later replaced by Bob Dalton) and guitarist/singer John Mitchell (from Arena, and subsequently Francis Dunnery's replacement in It Bites), who released the Picture album in 2005.

As a session or touring musician, Beck has played with John Wetton and Fish and is a longstanding contributor to the live line-up of the Alan Parsons Live Project.
