= Calling All the Heroes =

Single by It Bites

from the album The Big Lad in the Windmill
- Released: 23 June 1986
- Recorded: 1986
- Genre: Pop rock, new wave
- Length: 5:33
- Label: Virgin
- Songwriter(s): Francis Dunnery

It Bites singles chronology
"All in Red" (1986)	"Calling All the Heroes" (1986)	"Whole New World" (1986)

"Calling All the Heroes" is the second single by It Bites. It was written by frontman Francis Dunnery, and charted at #6 on the UK charts in August 1986.

== Track listing ==
7" vinyl:

1. "Calling All the Heroes" (7")
2. "Strange But True" (7")

12" vinyl:

1. "Calling All the Heroes" (Full Length Version)
2. "Calling All the Heroes" (7")
3. "Strange But True" (Full Length Version)
