= Paddington (film series) =

British film franchise

- Official logo
- Created by: Paul King
- Original work: Paddington (2014)
- Owner: StudioCanal
- Years: 2014–present
- Based on: Paddington Bear by Michael Bond

Films and television
- Film(s): Paddington (2014); Paddington 2 (2017); Paddington in Peru (2024)
- Short film(s): Ma'amalade sandwich Your Majesty? (2022)
- Animated series: The Adventures of Paddington (2019–2025)

Theatrical presentations
- Musical(s): Paddington: The Musical (2025)

Audio
- Soundtrack(s): Paddington (2014); Paddington 2 (2017)

Official website
- https://www.paddington.com/gb

Paddington is a live-action animated comedy film series based on the character Paddington Bear created by British author Michael Bond. It revolves around a kind-hearted and polite, yet accident-prone young bear from Darkest Peru who finds a home with the Brown family in London. The films are produced by StudioCanal, in collaboration with Heyday Films (on the first two films) and other production partners.

The first film, Paddington (2014), was directed by Paul King. It was followed by Paddington 2 (2017), which built on the success of the first film. Both films were commercially successful. A third installment, Paddington in Peru, was released on 8 November 2024 with Dougal Wilson taking over from King as director, making his feature directorial debut. The series has been credited with revitalising family cinema and remains popular with audiences of all ages. The success of the films has also led to spawning an animated television series, an opening short segment at the Queen's Platinum Jubilee and a stage musical.

== Films ==
=== Paddington (2014) ===
This is the first and only film to be distributed by The Weinstein Company in the United States, as the distribution rights to the film series originally were sold to Warner Bros. Pictures, and then to Sony Pictures following the Weinstein scandal in October 2017.

=== Paddington 2 (2017) ===
In April 2015, David Heyman confirmed that he would produce the second film in the franchise. It was also announced that Paul King would direct and co-write with Simon Farnaby. By October 2016, the cast of Paddington – Hugh Bonneville, Sally Hawkins, Julie Walters, Jim Broadbent, Peter Capaldi, Madeleine Harris, Samuel Joslin, Ben Whishaw and Imelda Staunton – were confirmed to be returning for the sequel, joined by new cast members Hugh Grant and Brendan Gleeson. Principal photography began in the same month. Framestore provided the visual effects for the film. Filming in Little Venice took place for three days. Filming also took place at Shepton Mallet Prison.

=== Paddington in Peru (2024) ===
In June 2016, StudioCanal CEO Didier Lupfer stated that the studio was committed to making a third Paddington film. In November 2017, David Heyman told Digital Spy that though the script for a third Paddington film had not developed, discussions about locations, ideas and scenes had already begun. In November 2018, Heyman noted that a third film was still likely to happen, but that Paul King would not be back to direct, though he would still be involved in a prominent creative capacity. The films' previous director, Paul King would not be directing the film as he was directing the film Wonka. King was set to executive produce the film and had written a story alongside Simon Farnaby and Mark Burton with a screenplay by Burton, Jon Foster and James Lamont.

On 13 June 2022, it was announced that the title of the film would be Paddington in Peru and will be directed by Dougal Wilson, with principal photography now set to begin in 2023, with some of the cast returning. In February 2023, Whishaw stated that he had yet to read a script and was unsure whether development was continuing.

In April 2023, it was confirmed that Paddington in Peru would start filming on 24 July, despite reports that it was suspended due to the 2023 SAG-AFTRA strike. New cast members joining the film included Antonio Banderas and Olivia Colman, while Sally Hawkins stepped down from her role as Mrs. Brown, and was recast with Emily Mortimer.

=== Future ===
During the Brand Licensing Europe 2024 convention in London, StudioCanal CEO Françoise Guyonnet and head of global sales Sissel Henno revealed that Canal+ is already working on a fourth Paddington film and a spin-off television series, given their focus to "turn a heritage brand into a global phenomenon" by delving deeper into the "ongoing journey of Paddington from a classic character to a worldwide cultural phenomenon", estimating the releases of both productions around 2027 and 2028, where the franchise would have its 70th anniversary. In May 2026, it was announced that the fourth film will be written by Armando Iannucci and Simon Blackwell, with Dougal Wilson in talks to direct.

== Production ==
The first film of the series was announced in September 2007, with David Heyman producing and Hamish McColl writing the screenplay. When filming began, Heyman announced the casting of Colin Firth as the voice of Paddington. Paddington is the most expensive film produced by the French production company StudioCanal.

In June 2014, after principal photography had wrapped, Firth voluntarily dropped out of the film, after the studio decided his voice was not suitable for Paddington. The role was recast the following month, with Ben Whishaw signing on to voice the title role. Paddington was created using a combination of computer-generated imagery (by the British company Framestore) and animatronics.

The creator of the Paddington character, Michael Bond, also appeared in a cameo in the first film, playing the role of the Kindly Gentleman.

When the films were dubbed into the Ukrainian language, Paddington was voiced by the country's current president Volodymyr Zelenskyy.

== Recurring cast and characters ==
List indicators

This section includes characters who will appear or have appeared in the Paddington franchise.

- An empty grey cell indicates the character was not in the film, or that the character's official presence has not yet been confirmed.
- ^{C} indicates a cameo role.
- ^{U} indicates an uncredited appearance.
- ^{V} indicates a voice-only role.

Characters	Films			Television series	Short film
Characters	Paddington	Paddington 2	Paddington in Peru	The Adventures of Paddington	Platinum Party at the Palace
Characters	2014	2017	2024	2019 - 2025	2022
Paddington Brown	Ben Whishaw^{V}	Ben Whishaw^{V}	Ben Whishaw^{V}	Ben Whishaw^{V}	Ben Whishaw^{V}
Henry Brown	Hugh Bonneville	Hugh Bonneville	Hugh Bonneville	Darren Boyd^{V}	
Mary Brown	Sally Hawkins	Sally Hawkins	Emily Mortimer	Morwenna Banks^{V} Teresa Gallagher^{V}	
Jonathan "J-Dog" Brown	Samuel Joslin	Samuel Joslin	Samuel Joslin	Bobby Beynon^{V}	
Judy Brown	Madeleine Harris	Madeleine Harris	Madeleine Harris	Sabrina Newton-Fisher^{V}	
Mrs. Bird	Julie Walters	Julie Walters	Julie Walters	Phyllis Logan^{V}	
Samuel Gruber	Jim Broadbent	Jim Broadbent	Jim Broadbent	David Schofield^{V}	
Barry	Simon Farnaby	Simon Farnaby	Simon Farnaby		Simon Farnaby
Aunt Lucy	Imelda Staunton^{V}	Imelda Staunton^{V}	Imelda Staunton^{V}		
Mr. Reginald Curry	Peter Capaldi	Peter Capaldi		Reece Shearsmith^{V}	
Uncle Pastuzo	Michael Gambon^{V}	Michael Gambon^{V}	Mentioned		
Millicent Clyde	Nicole Kidman Lottie Steer^{Y}				
Joe a taxi driver	Matt Lucas				
Grant	Kayvan Novak				
Montgomery Clyde	Tim Downie				
Agatha Clyde	Madeleine Worrall				
Phoenix Buchanan		Hugh Grant	Hugh Grant^{U}^{C}		
Colonel Lancaster		Ben Miller	Ben Miller		
Miss. Kitts		Jessica Hynes	Jessica Hynes		
Dr. Jafri		Sanjeev Bhaskar	Sanjeev Bhaskar		
Joe, the postman		Joel Fry	Joel Fry		
Knuckles McGinty		Brendan Gleeson			
Madame Kozlova		Eileen Atkins			
Gerald Biggleswade		Tom Conti			
Felicity Fanshaw		Joanna Lumley			
Miguel Phibs		Noah Taylor			
Raul "Spoon" Spooner		Aaron Neil			
Clarissa Cabot the Reverend Mother			Olivia Colman		
Hunter Cabot			Antonio Banderas		
Gina Cabot			Carla Tous		
Madison			Hayley Atwell		

== Crew ==
Film	UK release date	Director	Producer	Writers		Composer	Editor(s)	Cinematographer
Film	UK release date	Director	Producer	Screenplay by	Story by	Composer	Editor(s)	Cinematographer
Paddington	28 November 2014	Paul King	David Heyman	Paul King	Paul King & Hamish McColl	Nick Urata	Mark Everson	Erik Wilson
Paddington 2	10 November 2017	Paul King	David Heyman	Paul King & Simon Farnaby	Paul King & Simon Farnaby	Dario Marianelli	Mark Everson & Jonathan Amos	Erik Wilson
Paddington in Peru	8 November 2024	Dougal Wilson	Rosie Alison	Jon Foster, Mark Burton & James Lamont	Paul King, Mark Burton & Simon Farnaby	Dario Marianelli	Úna Ní Dhonghaíle	Erik Wilson

== Reception ==
=== Box office performance ===
Film	UK release date	Box office gross			Budget
Film	UK release date	UK	Other territories	Worldwide	Budget
Paddington	28 November 2014	$98,949,993	$249,825,949	$326,113,057	$65 million
Paddington 2	10 November 2017	$110,941,884	$249,223,228	$290,132,513	$40 million
Paddington in Peru	8 November 2024	$49,992,306	$146,344,700	$192,115,012	$90 million
Total		$259,884,183	$645,393,877	$808,360,582	$195 million

=== Critical reception ===
Critical and public response of Paddington films
Film	Critical		Public
Film	Rotten Tomatoes	Metacritic	CinemaScore
Paddington	96% (163 reviews)	77 (38 critics)	A
Paddington 2	99% (253 reviews)	88 (38 critics)	A
Paddington in Peru	93% (193 reviews)	65 (46 critics)	A

=== BAFTA Awards ===
Film	Category	Result
Paddington	Alexander Korda Award for Best British Film	Nominated
Paddington	Best Adapted Screenplay	Nominated
Paddington 2	Best British Film	Nominated
Paddington 2	Best Actor in a Supporting Role (Hugh Grant)	Nominated
Paddington 2	Best Adapted Screenplay	Nominated

== Other media ==
=== Television series ===
In October 2017, it was announced that StudioCanal was producing an animated series, set to launch in either late 2018 or early 2019. It was announced in February 2019, that the series would launch worldwide in 2020 on Nickelodeon, with Whishaw reprising his voice of Paddington.

On 20 November 2019, it was announced that the series would premiere on 20 January 2020 after a sneak preview which aired on 20 December 2019.

=== Short film ===
For the "Platinum Party at the Palace" music concert that would open the Platinum Jubilee of Elizabeth II, the Queen acted in a short film directed by Mark Burton to open the concert in which the Queen hosts Paddington Bear (with Whishaw reprising his role) for tea in honour of the Jubilee. The Queen is seen patiently tolerating a tea-slurping Paddington who, upon realising his mistake, attempts to pour tea for her. However, he stomps over a pastry on the table and ends up covering a footman (played by Simon Farnaby) in cream. As Paddington offers the Queen a marmalade sandwich, and tells her that he always keeps one for emergencies, the Queen confides "So do I" and, prising open her handbag, tells him: "I keep mine in here". Later, Paddington congratulates the Queen on her reign, exclaiming: "Happy Jubilee Ma'am. And thank you for everything". The sequence ends with both the Queen and Paddington using a spoon to tap out the beat of Queen's "We Will Rock You" on teacup.

The Queen spent around half a day filming the sketch at Windsor Castle, and had since kept it a secret from some of her family members. A Buckingham Palace spokesman stated: "While the Queen may not be attending the concert in person, she was very keen that people understood how much it meant to her and that all those watching had a great time. [...] Her Majesty is well known for her sense of humour, so it should be no surprise that she decided to take part in tonight's sketch."

=== Stage musical ===
A stage musical adaptation based on the original stories and film series opened in London's West End in November 2025. The musical was produced by Sonia Friedman Productions, StudioCanal and Eliza Lumley Productions on behalf of Universal Music UK, features music and lyrics by Tom Fletcher, book by Jessica Swale and is directed by Luke Sheppard. In April 2026, the production won seven Laurence Olivier Awards with eleven nominations.

== See also ==
- London in film
