= Paddington Bear =

Character created by Michael Bond

- Paddington character
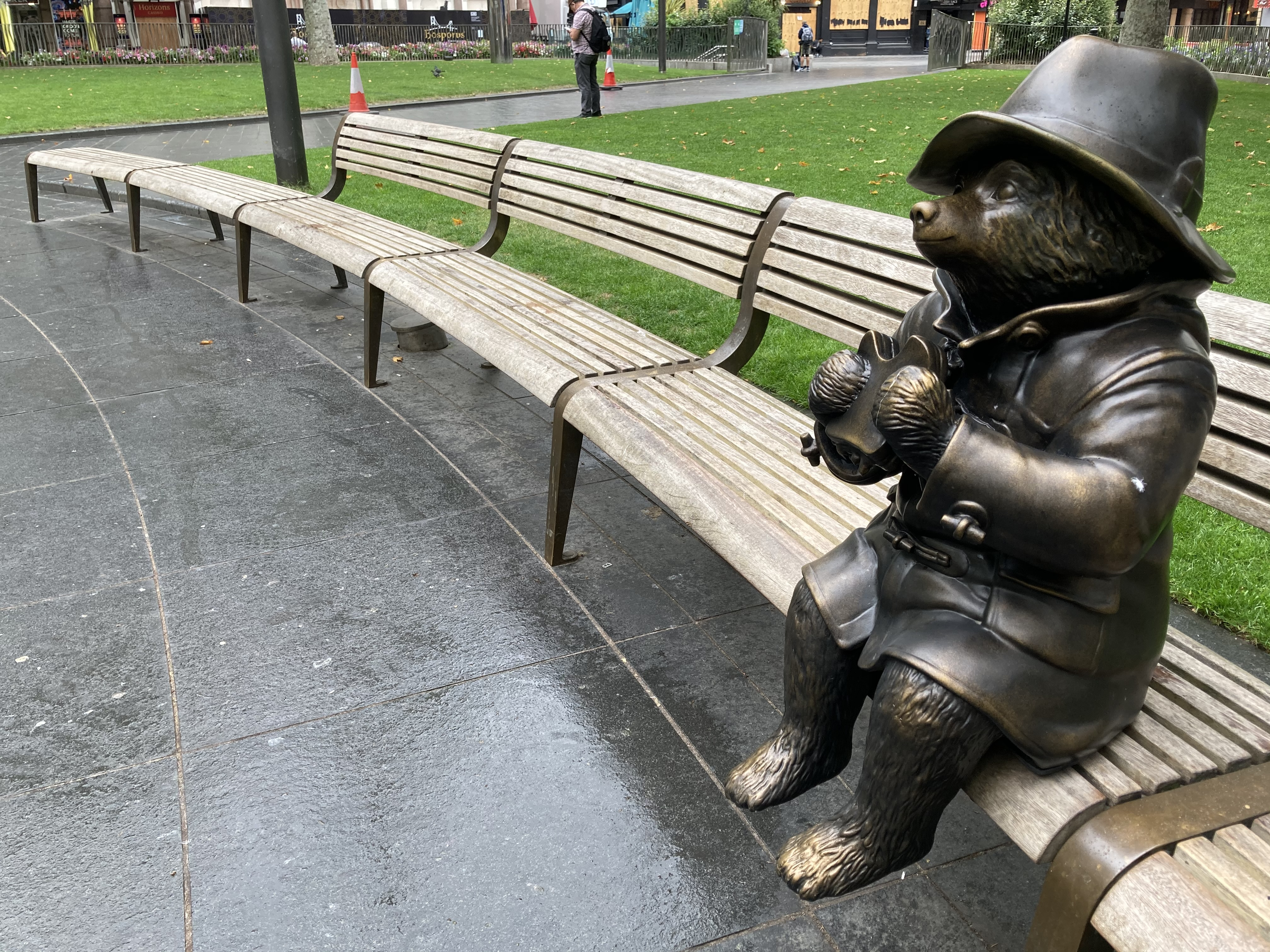
- Statue of Paddington eating a marmalade sandwich in Leicester Square, London
- First appearance: A Bear Called Paddington; 13 October 1958
- Created by: Michael Bond
- Voiced by: Michael Hordern (1976-1980 TV series); Ben Whishaw (2014–2024 film series)

In-universe information
- Alias: Paddington
- Species: Spectacled bear
- Gender: Male
- Family: Aunt Lucy; Uncle Pastuzo; Mary Brown; Henry Brown; Jonathan Brown; Judy Brown; Mrs Bird; Theodore
- Origin: Peru
- Nationality: Peruvian; British

Paddington Bear is a fictional, anthropomorphic bear created by English author Michael Bond. He made his debut in A Bear Called Paddington, which was published on 13 October 1958. Since then, Paddington has appeared in 29 other books written by Bond, the last of which, Paddington at St Paul's, was published posthumously in 2018. The books have been illustrated by Peggy Fortnum, David McKee, R. W. Alley, and other artists.

Despite the character's upbringing in the jungles of Peru, Paddington Bear is widely considered one of Great Britain's national treasures. Paddington is named after London's Paddington railway station, he wears red Wellington boots in several depictions, and he has a characteristic fondness for marmalade and marmalade sandwiches. Upon completion of the Channel Tunnel in 1990, British tunnelers presented a Paddington teddy bear to their French counterparts as a gift. Paddington also starred opposite Queen Elizabeth II in a pre-recorded comedy segment for the Platinum Party at the Palace in 2022.

Paddington books have sold over 35 million copies worldwide, and his adventures have been translated into 40 different languages. StudioCanal owns worldwide television, merchandising, live entertainment, video game, and theme park rights to the Paddington I.P. In 2023, StudioCanal and HarperCollins Children's Books renewed their Paddington TV and movie publishing deal for another three years.

Paddington Bear has been adapted for film, TV, and stage. FilmFair's television adaptation aired on the BBC from 1976 to 1980. The critically acclaimed and commercially successful films Paddington (2014) and Paddington 2 (2017) were both nominated for the BAFTA Award for Outstanding British Film. A third film in the series, Paddington in Peru, was released in 2024. The following year, a stage adaptation, Paddington: The Musical, premiered at the Savoy Theatre in the West End.

== History ==
=== Origin ===
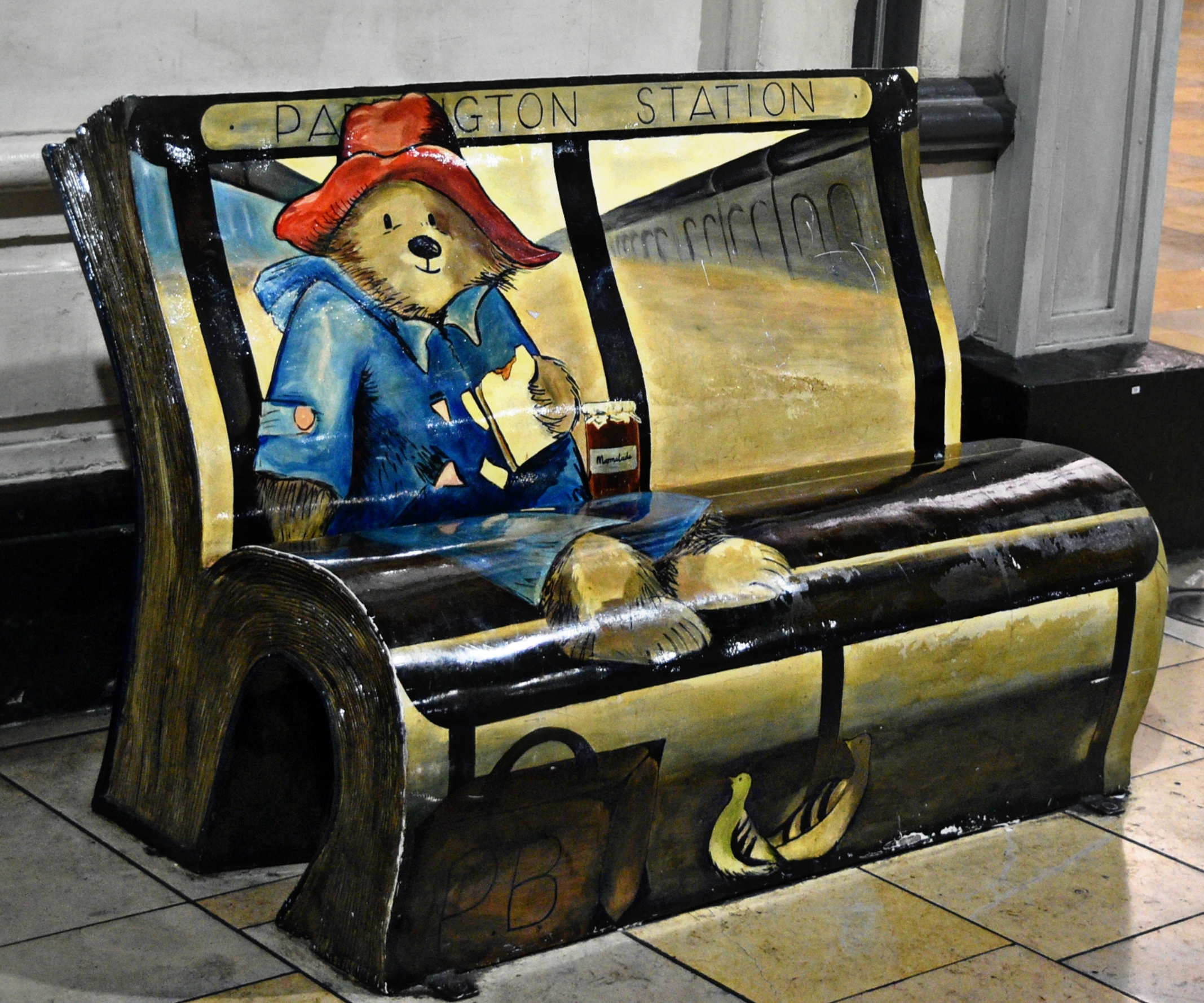
Paddington Bear-themed bench at Paddington station in London. The creator of the character, Michael Bond, who based Paddington on a lone teddy bear which he had bought for his wife on Christmas Eve 1956, named the bear after the station.

Michael Bond based Paddington Bear on a lone teddy bear that he noticed on a shelf in a London shop—with Bond saying "it looked rather forlorn"—on Christmas Eve 1956, which he bought as a present for his wife. On the bear's refugee status, Bond was inspired by the sight, during World War, of London children who were being evacuated to the countryside, the evacuees bearing luggage labels perhaps similar to that attached to the bear Paddington "Please look after this bear". Bond reflects, "They all had a label round their neck with their name and address on and a little case or package containing all their treasured possessions. So Paddington, in a sense, was a refugee, and I do think that there's no sadder sight than refugees".

The bear inspired Bond to write a story and in ten days, he had written the first book. He named the bear Paddington as he lived near the station at the time and thought it would be a good name for the character. Bond's daughter Karen states, "Had he lived in another part of the country or not travelled by train, he might never have come up with the idea for a bear being found on Paddington station." The book was given to his agent, Harvey Unna. A Bear Called Paddington was first published on 13 October 1958 by William Collins & Sons.

=== Paddington Bear ===
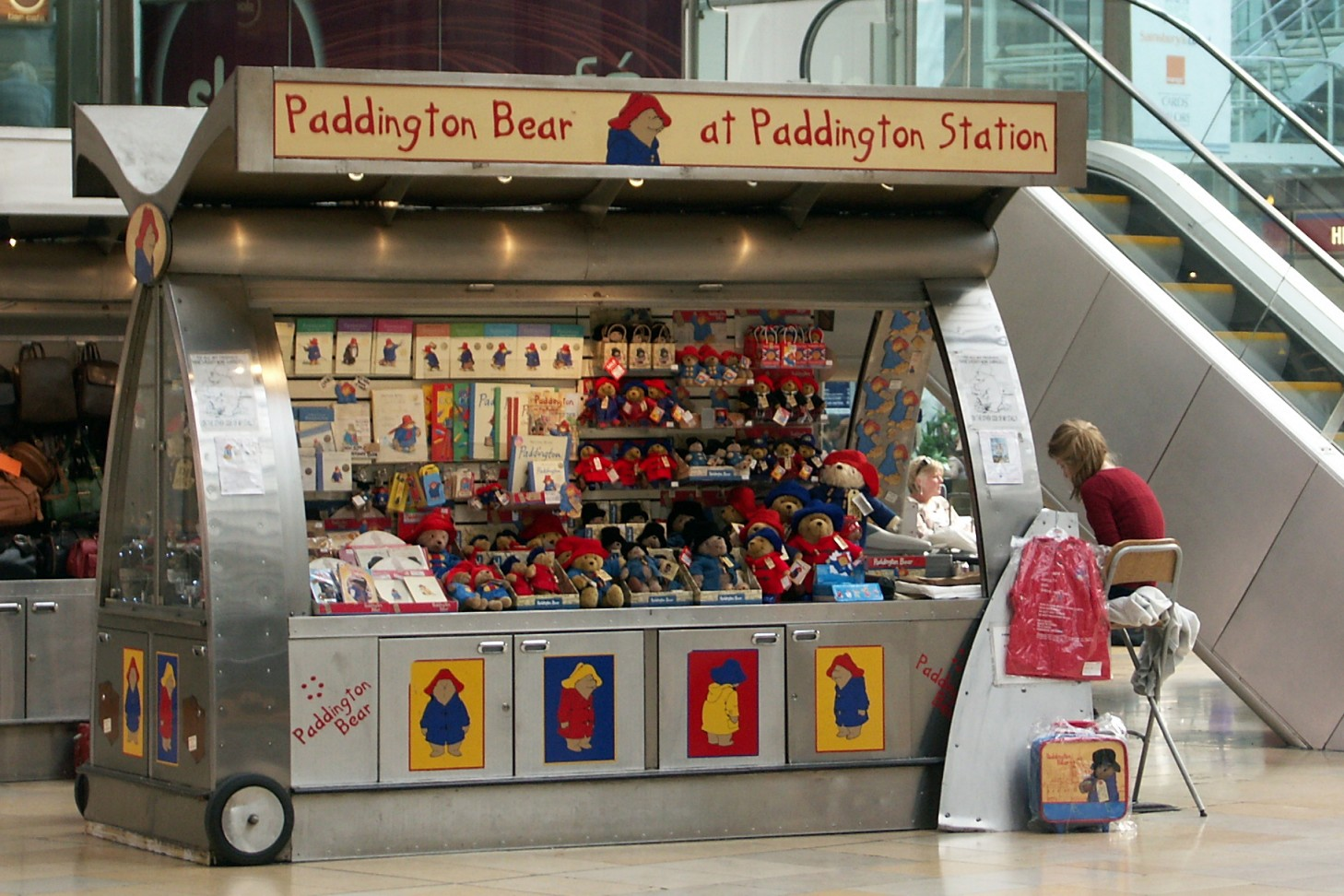
Paddington Bear merchandise, including the stuffed toy, on sale at Paddington station

The first Paddington Bear stuffed toy to be manufactured was created in 1972 by Gabrielle Designs, a small family business run by Shirley and Eddie Clarkson, with the prototype made as a Christmas present for their children Joanna and Jeremy Clarkson, a now well-known British TV presenter, writer and farmer. Michael Bond had awarded the Clarksons the licensing of the toy rights throughout the world.

Shirley Clarkson dressed the stuffed bear in Wellington boots to help it stand upright. (Paddington received Wellingtons for Christmas in Paddington Marches On, 1964.) The earliest bears wore small children's boots manufactured by Dunlop Rubber until production could not meet demand. Gabrielle Designs then produced their boots with paw prints moulded into the soles. Shirley Clarkson's book describes the evolution of the toy Paddington from a Christmas gift to the subject of litigation and ultimately commercial success. The family eventually sold the rights to Britain's (and the world's) oldest toy store, Hamleys.

== Storyline ==
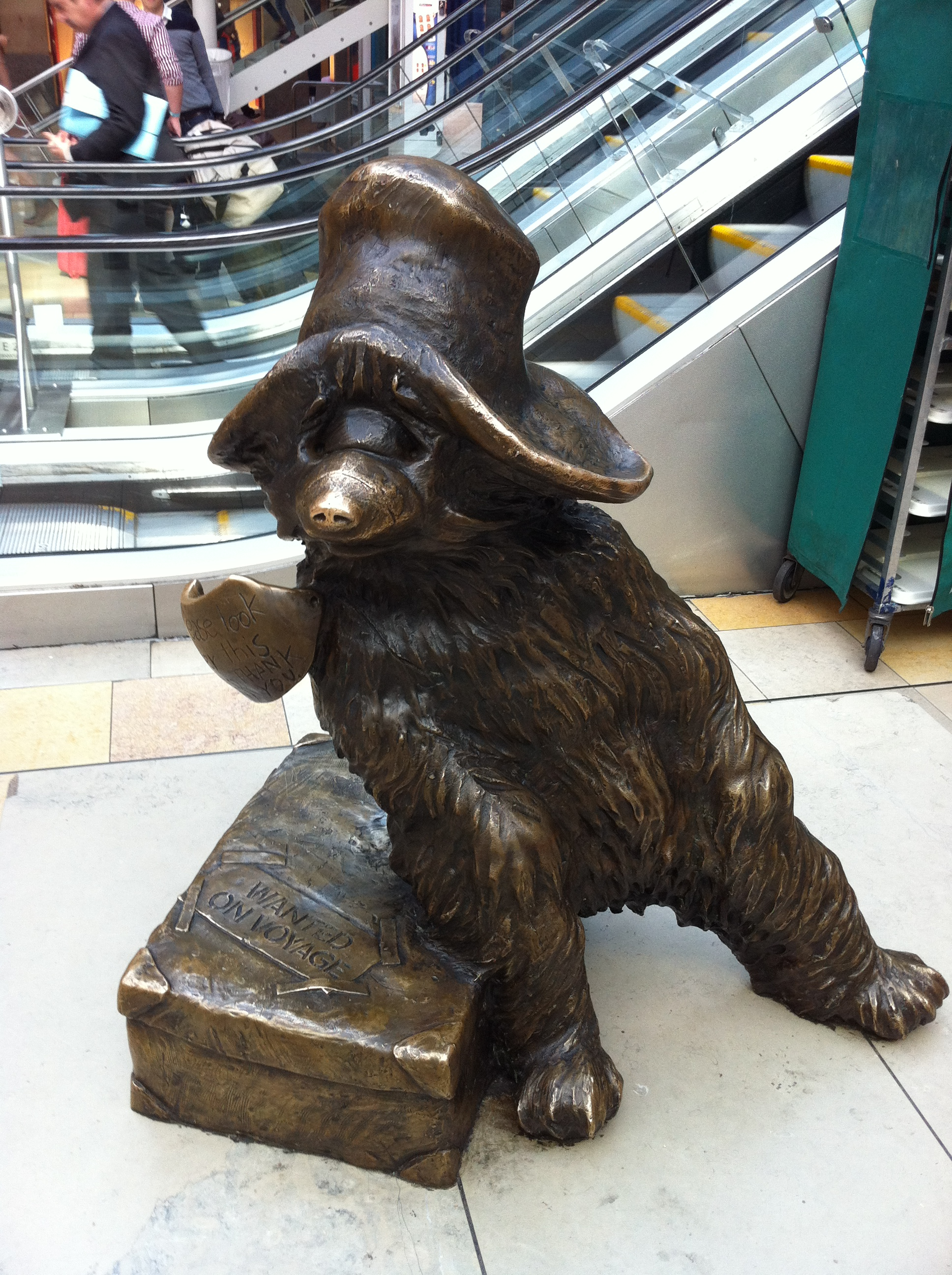
Statue of Paddington Bear, by sculptor Marcus Cornish, at Paddington station

Platform 1 at Paddington station with the Paddington statue below the clock

In the first story, the middle-class Brown family found Paddington at Paddington railway station in London. Paddington was sitting on his suitcase with a note attached to his coat that read "Please look after this bear. Thank you." Bond has said that his memories of newsreels showing trainloads of child evacuees leaving London during World War II, with labels around their necks and their possessions in small suitcases, prompted him to do the same for Paddington.

Paddington arrives as a stowaway coming from "Darkest Peru", sent by his Aunt Lucy, one of only a few known relatives aside from Uncle Pastuzo, who gave Paddington his hat, who has gone to live in the Home for Retired Bears in Lima after an earthquake destroyed their home. He claims, "I came in a lifeboat and ate marmalade. Did you know bears like marmalade?" Afterwards, he and the Browns go to a restaurant inside the station while they decide what to do. Here he tells Mr Brown his bear name; however, it is difficult for him to pronounce. After deciding they would take him in for the night, the Browns decided to give him an English name and named him Paddington after the railway station in which he was found.

Bond originally wanted Paddington to have "travelled from darkest Africa," but his agent advised him that there were no bears in Africa, and thus it was amended to Peru, home of the spectacled bear.

The Browns take Paddington home to 32 Windsor Gardens near Notting Hill. While there is a real Windsor Gardens off Harrow Road between Notting Hill and Maida Vale, close to the location as described in the books, the Windsor Gardens in the book is fictitious and does not resemble the real road. The fictitious house was based on a real-life equivalent in Notting Hill, but Bond kept the location secret to avoid inconvenience for the real inhabitants of the house. Paddington frequents the nearby Portobello Road market, where he is respected by the shopkeepers for driving a hard bargain.

When he gets annoyed with someone, he often gives them one of his special "hard stares", taught to him by Aunt Lucy, which causes them to become flushed and embarrassed. Paddington's adventures usually arise from his misunderstanding something and trying to right (what he perceives to be) unfair or unjust situations. This typically ends with him messing things up in some way. But in all his adventures, he ends up on top, and everyone involved can laugh about it. A notable exception is the Browns' next-door neighbour, Mr Curry, who, in every adventure, ends up in trouble.

The stories follow Paddington's adventures and mishaps in England, along with some snippets of information about his past. For instance, one story reveals that Paddington was orphaned in an earthquake before being taken in and raised by his Aunt Lucy.

=== Characters ===
There is a recurring cast of characters, all of whom are in some way entangled in Paddington's misadventures. These include:

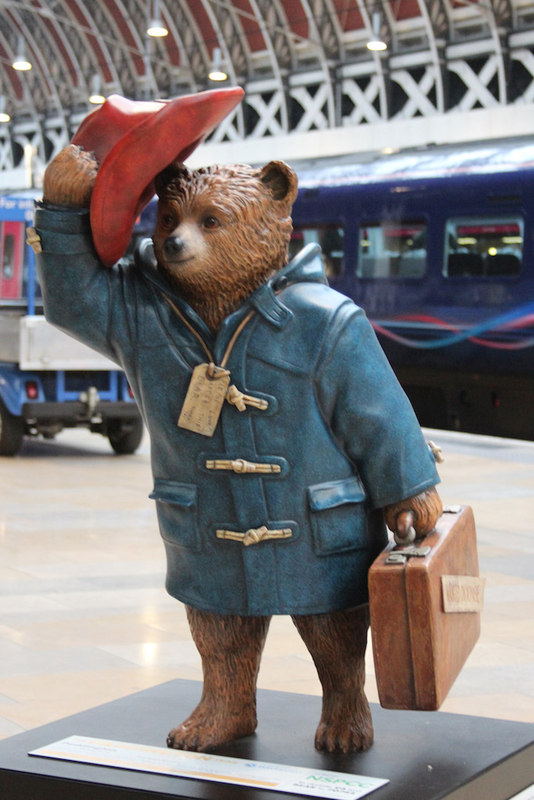
Statue of Paddington in his classic look, blue duffel coat and red hat, designed by Bond, at Paddington station

- Paddington Bear: A friendly, charismatic and polite spectacled bear from Darkest Peru. Paddington was taken in by Aunt Lucy and Uncle Pastuzo after his parents died in an earthquake when he was very young. Paddington moves in with the Browns after Aunt Lucy moves into the Home for Retired Bears. Paddington is usually in some sort of trouble. Paddington's given name is hard to pronounce. The film establishes that it is a series of roars that Mr Brown attempts to imitate, producing something offensive. Paddington is always extremely polite but inflicts "hard stares" when people forget their manners. Mrs Brown names him after Paddington Station when they're picking up Judy, their daughter, from boarding school.
- Mr Henry Brown: A hapless but well-meaning man who works in Insurance in the City of London. In the film, Henry initially refuses to let Paddington move in with his family, but despite some early mishaps (including Paddington getting earwax on his toothbrush and flooding the bathroom), he eventually warms to Paddington and builds him a bedroom in their attic.
- Mrs Mary Brown: Henry's more serious-minded yet exceptionally friendly wife. In the 1989 animated series, Mary and her husband have a 12-year-old American nephew named David Russell. In the film adaptation, she works as an author and illustrator and is the first of the Browns to warm to Paddington.
- Judy and Jonathan Brown: The energetic and friendly Brown children. In the original books, it is never established if one is older than the other, leading to the possibility that they might be twins. In the 1976 animated series, the film series and the 2019 animated series, Judy is older. In the 1989 animated series and the 1997 animated series, Jonathan is older. They meet Paddington for the first time when meeting Judy off the train from boarding school. In the movie, Judy and Jonathan are with their parents when they first meet him at Paddington Station, giving him his iconic name.
- Mrs Bird: The Browns' stern but kind and wise housekeeper. Although she is often annoyed by Paddington's antics and mishaps, she is protective of him and very caring. Her first name is never mentioned. In the film adaptation, she is portrayed instead as a Scottish distant relative of the Browns and the widow of a naval officer.
- Mr Samuel Gruber: Paddington's best friend. The friendly owner of an antique shop on the Portobello Road, with whom Paddington has his elevenses every day. He regularly takes Paddington and the Brown children on outings. He is a Hungarian immigrant. He addresses Paddington as "Mr Brown." Bond based Mr Gruber on his first agent, a German Jew, whom Bond states "was in line to be the youngest judge in Germany, when he was warned his name was on a list, so he got out and came to England with just a suitcase and £25 to his name."
- Mr Reginald Curry: The Browns' mean, nosy, arrogant, grumpy, and bad-tempered next-door neighbor, who serves as a contrast to Mr Gruber. He addresses Paddington simply as "Bear!" Penny-pinching by nature, Mr Curry always wants something for nothing and often persuades Paddington to run errands for him. He tends to invite himself to many of the Browns' special occasions just to sample the snacks. In most of the stories, he gets his comeuppance as a frequent victim of Paddington's misadventures. However, Mr Curry does sometimes benefit from Paddington's mistakes and has even rewarded Paddington for them on occasion.
- Aunt Lucy: Paddington's aunt from Darkest Peru. The film establishes that she and Uncle Pastuzo rescued Paddington rather than being biologically related to him. She was his legal guardian until she had to move into the Home for Retired Bears in Lima, Peru. In the movie, after a deadly earthquake kills Uncle Pastuzo, she informs Paddington that she is too old to travel to London with him, although in Paddington 2, the residents of Windsor Gardens arrange for her to come to London and see it for herself. In the film adaptation, the explorer Montgomery Clyde names her "Lucy" after his late mother.
- Uncle Pastuzo: Paddington's wealthy globe-trotting uncle, revealed in the film adaptation to have been named by the explorer Montgomery Clyde—who gave him his hat—after a boxer he met in a bar. In the film adaptation, Uncle Pastuzo is killed by a falling tree during an earthquake, and Paddington retrieves his hat.

== Books ==
The first of Bond's twenty nine original books, A Bear Called Paddington, was published in 1958. Although the books are divided into chapters and each book has a time frame, the stories all work as stand-alone stories, and many of them were used like this in the TV series. In order of publication, the titles are:

A Bear Called Paddington (1958)
The stories in the first book in the series are:
1. "Please Look After This Bear" – The Browns first meet Paddington at Paddington station.
2. "A Bear in Hot Water" – Paddington's first attempt at having a bath is a disaster.
3. "Paddington Goes Underground" – Paddington's first journey on the Underground causes chaos.
4. "A Shopping Expedition" – Paddington gets lost during a shopping trip.
5. "Paddington and 'The Old Master'" – This story introduces Mr Gruber. After hearing Mr Gruber talk about painting, Paddington decides to try his hand at it himself.
6. "A Visit to the Theatre" – Paddington goes to see a play with the Browns. Unable to understand the concept of drama, he believes what he sees to be real.
7. "Adventure at the Seaside" – Paddington takes part in a sandcastle competition.
8. "A Disappearing Trick" – Paddington receives a conjuring outfit for his first birthday with the Browns and puts on a magic show. This story introduces the Browns' grumpy neighbour Mr Curry.
More About Paddington (1959)
The stories in the second book in the series are:
1. "A Family Group" – Paddington takes a family photo of the Browns.
2. "A Spot of Decorating" – Paddington tries to help Mr Brown by decorating his room whilst the family is out.
3. "Paddington Turns Detective" – Paddington investigates the disappearance of Mr Brown's prize marrow.
4. "Paddington and the Bonfire" – The Browns hold a bonfire party at No. 32 Windsor Gardens.
5. "Trouble at No.32" – Paddington catches a nasty chill when a winter prank goes disastrously wrong.
6. "Paddington and the Christmas Shopping" – Paddington buys presents for the Brown family.
7. "Christmas" – Paddington enjoys his first Christmas with the Browns.
Paddington Helps Out (1960)
The stories in the third book in the series are:
1. "A Picnic on the River" – Paddington gets more than he bargained for when the Browns hire a boat for a day on the river.
2. "Paddington Makes a Bid" – Mr Gruber takes Paddington to an auction sale.
3. "Paddington and 'Do It Yourself'" – After reading a DIY magazine, Paddington tries to make presents for Mr Brown and (reluctantly) Mr Curry.
4. "A Visit to the Cinema" – The Browns go to see a cowboy film. When the special attraction is cancelled, Paddington comes to the rescue.
5. "Something Nasty in the Kitchen" – With Mr and Mrs Brown sick in bed and the rest of the family out of the house, Paddington prepares dinner.
6. "Trouble at the Launderette" – A reluctant Paddington takes Mr Curry's laundry to be cleaned.
7. "Paddington Dines Out" – The Browns organise a special meal for Paddington's birthday.
Paddington Abroad (1961)
The stories in the fourth book in the series are:
1. "Paddington Prepares" – Mr Brown announces a holiday in France.
2. "A Visit to the Bank" – A misunderstanding causes uproar at the bank.
3. "Trouble at the Airport" – Airport officials suspect Paddington is travelling without a passport.
4. "Paddington Saves the Day" – The Browns' car gets a puncture and Mr Brown organises an al-fresco meal.
5. "Paddington and the 'Pardon'" – Paddington takes part in a local festival.
6. "A Spot of Fishing" – The Browns and Paddington go on a fishing trip and get marooned.
7. "Paddington Takes to the Road" – Paddington participates in the Tour de France.
Paddington at Large (1962)
The stories in the fifth book in the series are:
1. "Paddington Breaks the Peace" – Paddington causes chaos trying to mow Mr Curry's lawn.
2. "Mr Gruber's Outing" – Mr Gruber takes Paddington, Judy, and Jonathan to the park.
3. "Goings-On at Number Thirty-two" – Paddington mistakes a man installing the Browns' new television for a burglar.
4. "Paddington Hits the Jackpot" – Paddington wins a TV quiz show.
5. "A Sticky Time" – Paddington tries to make toffee.
6. "Trouble in the Bargain Basement" – Paddington goes Christmas shopping.
7. "Paddington and the Christmas Pantomime" – Paddington helps out at a local panto.
Paddington Marches On (1964)
The stories in this sixth collection are:
1. "Paddington and the Cold Snap" – Paddington tries to defrost Mr Curry's pipes.
2. "A Most Unusual Ceremony" – Paddington is invited to a ceremony at a marmalade factory.
3. "Paddington Makes a Clean Sweep" – Paddington makes a mess cleaning the chimney.
4. "Mr Gruber's Mystery Tour" – Paddington and Mr Gruber go on a mystery tour of London.
5. "Paddington Saves the Day" – Paddington plays cricket.
6. "A Day by the Sea" – Paddington and the Browns go to the seaside.
7. "An Unexpected Party" – The Browns celebrate Paddington's (temporary) return to Peru with a farewell party.
Paddington at Work (1966)
The stories in this seventh collection are:
1. "A Bear at Sea" – Paddington sails back from Peru.
2. "Anchors Away" – Paddington attends a party on board the liner sailing back from Peru.
3. "Paddington Buys a Share" – Paddington is persuaded to buy a share in a business.
4. "A Visit to the Stock Exchange" – Paddington tries to sell his newly acquired share.
5. "Paddington in a Hole" – Paddington helps Mr Curry renovate his house.
6. "Too Much off the Top" – Paddington answers a job advert in a barber's shop.
7. "Paddington Steps Out" – Paddington and the Browns attend a ballet performance.
Paddington Goes to Town (1968)
The stories in this eighth collection are:
1. "A Day to Remember" – Paddington acts as an usher at a friend's wedding.
2. "Paddington Hits Out" – Paddington accompanies Mr Curry to a golf competition.
3. "A Visit to the Hospital" – Visiting Mr Curry in the hospital, Paddington meets a psychiatrist.
4. "Paddington Finds a Cure" – Paddington finds a cure for Mr Curry's ailments.
5. "Paddington and the 'Finishing Touch'" – Paddington seeks the 'finishing touch' to Mr Gruber's patio.
6. "Everything Comes to Those Who Wait" – Paddington's attempts to go carol singing do not go according to plan.
7. "Paddington Goes to Town" – Paddington, the Brown family, and Mr Gruber visit the Christmas lights and decorations in the West End of London.
Paddington Takes the Air (1970)
The stories in this ninth collection are:
1. "A Visit to the Dentist" – Paddington's first visit to a dentist does not go according to plan.
2. "A Stitch in Time" – Paddington's skills with a sewing machine are tested by Mr Curry.
3. "Riding High" – Paddington enters a gymkhana at Judy's school, at which the secret of his horsemanship is revealed.
4. "Paddington Strikes a Bargain" – Paddington goes to great lengths to help Mr Gruber enter his classic car in the local parade.
5. "The Case of the Doubtful Dummy" – Paddington takes inspiration from the stories of the detective Carlton Dale to carry out his own investigation.
6. "Paddington Recommended" – Paddington visits a department store where a case of mistaken identity occurs in the restaurant.
7. "The Last Dance" – Paddington displays his newly acquired knowledge of ballroom dancing.
Paddington's Garden (1972)
A single-story picture book. Later adapted—with new illustrations—as Paddington in the Garden, and collected in The Paddington Treasury for the Very Young (2010).
Paddington's Blue Peter Story Book (1973)
This collects together stories previously published in the Blue Peter annuals, which Michael Bond had written during his time as a cameraman on the programme. The stories all include references to Blue Peter and feature its contemporary presenters, John Noakes, Peter Purves, and Valerie Singleton.
1. "Paddington Takes the Cake" – Paddington is invited to bake a Christmas cake on Blue Peter.
2. "Paddington Gets the Bird" – Paddington looks after Joey, the Blue Peter parrot, while John, Val and Peter are on their Summer Expedition.
3. "Paddington to the Rescue" – The Browns take a surprising trip to the seaside.
4. "Paddington Goes Halves" – Mr Curry agrees to help Paddington enter a Blue Peter origami competition.
5. "Paddington Gives a Service" – Paddington helps out when a tennis doubles match in the Blue Peter studio needs a player at short notice.
6. "Paddington Weighs In" – Paddington investigates when he hears the Blue Peter presenters have lost pounds at a new hotel.

(Published in the US as "Paddington on TV."

Paddington at the Tower (1973)
A single-story picture book, aimed at younger readers.
Paddington on Top (1974)
The tenth collection features the following stories:
1. "Paddington Goes to School" – Paddington attends a local school and encounters a fearsome teacher.
2. "Paddington Cleans Up" – Paddington encounters a vacuum cleaner salesman, whose offer proves too good to be true.
3. "Paddington Goes to Court" – Mr Gruber aims to explain to Paddington the workings of the law. On a trip to the Royal Courts of Justice, Paddington gets unexpectedly called as a witness.
4. "A Birthday Treat" – The Browns visit the seaside resort of Brightsea to celebrate Paddington's birthday. Whilst there, Paddington takes an interest in a new leisure activity.
5. "Keeping Fit" – Paddington orders a 'home body-building outfit', from an advertisement in one of Mrs Brown's magazines.
6. "Paddington in Touch" – The Browns are invited to a rugby match between the local school and a visiting team from Peru.
7. "Comings and Goings at Number Thirty-two" – The Browns host a visitor from Peru in the run-up to Christmas.
Paddington Takes the Test (1979)
The eleventh collection in the main series includes these stories:
1. "Paddington at the Wheel" – Mr Brown has been ordered to re-take his driving test after a minor accident, but a series of misunderstandings leads to Paddington ending up behind the wheel instead.
2. "In and Out of Trouble" – A reluctant Paddington is roped in to test Mr Curry's "new" hammock.
3. "Paddington and the Stately Home" – Mr Gruber takes Paddington, Jonathan, and Judy to visit a stately home.
4. "Paddington and 'Bob-a-Job'" – Paddington takes part in the local scouts' "bob-a-job" week.
5. "Paddington Gets a Rise" – Paddington tries to make money to buy Mr Brown a birthday present.
6. "Mr Curry Lets Off Steam" – Mr Curry bags himself a free go at Mr Brown's new sauna bath, but lives to regret it.
7. "Pantomime Time" – The Browns and Mr Gruber enjoy a Christmas treat.
Paddington on Screen (1980)
Following up Paddington's Blue Peter Story Book (1973) this collection collects the remaining stories published in the Blue Peter annuals, which Michael Bond had written during his time as a cameraman on the programme. These stories again feature occasional appearances from the Blue Peter presenters, including newcomer Lesley Judd and newsreader Angela Rippon.
1. "Paddington's Puzzle" – Paddington's new jigsaw does not please Mr Curry.
2. "A Spoonful of Paddington" – Paddington takes up spoon bending after seeing Uri Geller on Blue Peter.
3. "Paddington Clocks In" – The ticking from Paddington's suitcase causes alarm at BBC TV Centre.
4. "Paddington Passes Through" – Paddington mislays his shopping basket on wheels in BBC TV Centre, leading to his impromptu appearance on a number of BBC programmes.
5. "Paddington Takes a Cut" – Paddington attempts some topiary in Mr Curry's garden.
6. "Paddington's Christmas Treasure Hunt" – Paddington takes up metal detecting.
7. "Paddington in the 'Hot Seat'" – Paddington takes part in the TV quiz show Sage of Britain.
Paddington at the Zoo (1984)
A single-story picture book, aimed at younger readers. Later collected in The Paddington Treasury for the Very Young (2010)
Paddington and the Knickerbocker Rainbow (1985)
A single-story picture book, aimed at younger readers.
Paddington's Painting Exhibition (1985)
A single-story picture book, aimed at younger readers.
Paddington at the Fair (1985)
A single-story picture book, aimed at younger readers.
Paddington at the Palace (1986)
A single-story picture book, aimed at younger readers. Later collected in The Paddington Treasury for the Very Young (2010)
Paddington's Magical Christmas (1988)
A single-story picture book, aimed at younger readers. This book has not yet been collected or reissued in line with the other picture books.
Paddington Bear and the Busy Bee Carnival (1998)
A single-story picture book aimed at young readers. Paddington attends river boat carnival, where he tries to win in a spelling bee competition by collecting words starting with the letter "B".
Paddington Goes to Hospital (2001)
A single-story picture book, aimed at younger readers. Co-written with Karen Jankel. The author's profits went to Action Research.
Paddington and the Grand Tour (2003)
A single-story picture book, aimed at younger readers.
Paddington Here and Now (2008)
This twelfth collection in the main series was published almost thirty years after the last and coincided with Paddington's fiftieth anniversary. The stories included in this volume are:
1. "Parking Problems" – After Paddington's shopping basket on wheels is towed away, his visit to the local police station does not go according to plan.
2. "Paddington's Good Turn" – Paddington's efforts at crime prevention have surprising results.
3. "Paddington Strikes a Chord" – The arrival of a special piano in Mr Gruber's shop leads to a memorable recital.
4. "Paddington Takes the Biscuit" – Paddington and the Browns celebrate Halloween. Mr Curry is unimpressed.
5. "Paddington Spills the Beans" – Paddington speaks to an investigative reporter. The Browns worry about the consequences.
6. "Paddington Aims High" – Paddington visits a travel agent to plan a journey. Then a traveller arrives at No. 32 Windsor Gardens.
7. "Paddington's Christmas Surprise" – Paddington's visitor organises a surprise trip for the Brown family.
Paddington Races Ahead (2012)
The thirteenth collection in the main series includes these stories:
1. "Mr Curry's Birthday Treat" – Paddington endeavours to help with Mr Curry's 'birthday list'.
2. "A Fishy Business" – A new artwork in Mr Gruber's shop inspires Paddington to create a collage.
3. "Spring Cleaning" – Paddington's attempts to clean his room result in a surprising discovery.
4. "A Chance Encounter" – On his way to see Mr Gruber, Paddington meets a very persistent sports journalist.
5. "Paddington in Training" – Paddington visits a new health club on the Portobello Road.
6. "Paddington Flies a Kite" – A picnic in the park leads to some unexpected 'noises off' at an outdoor production of Hamlet.
7. "Paddington on Track" – 'News' of Paddington's sporting prowess reaches Peru: a film-maker is sent to London to record Paddington's feats.
Paddington Goes for Gold (2012)
A single-story picture book, aimed at younger readers. Released to coincide with London hosting the Summer Olympic Games.
Love from Paddington (2014)
A book of letters from Paddington and his Aunt Lucy, which retell stories seen in the previous collections from Paddington's perspective.
Paddington's Finest Hour (2017)

The fourteenth collection of the main series includes these stories:

1. "Parking Problems" – Paddington's attempts to post a letter attract the attention of the police.
2. "A Bird in the Hand" – Paddington inspects his garden rockery.
3. "Curry's the Name" – Paddington helps Mr Curry in his garden. But what purpose has Mr Curry in mind?
4. "Paddington's Magical Moments" – Paddington's magic tricks at Mr Gruber's surprise birthday party do not amuse Mr Curry.
5. "Dinner for One" – Paddington enters a popular TV cookery competition.
6. "A Visit to the Cleaners" – Paddington attempts some make-do-and-mend clothes repairs.
7. "Paddington's Finest Hour" – The Browns go to the theatre to see a Variety show. Paddington partakes of some audience participation.
Paddington at St Paul's (2018)

Set in St Paul's Cathedral, this picture book is the finale of the original twenty nine stories in the Paddington series. It was finished shortly before Michael Bond's death. The final book in the "Paddington" series to be written by the creator himself was released on 27 June 2018 to mark the anniversary of the day that Bond died and the 60th anniversary of A Bear Called Paddington (1958).

=== Special publications ===
1. The Adventures of a Bear Called Paddington; A play for children (1974) adapted by Alfred Bradley from the stories by Michael Bond. Music by Bert Chappell. Lyrics by Bert Chappell, Brenda Johnson, and Alfred Bradley. Published and licensed by Samuel French Ltd. London. A full-length small-cast musical play in two acts. The play opened in 1973 in the Nottingham Playhouse and the Duke of York's Theatre in London the following year.
2. Paddington on Stage – Plays for children (1974). Adapted by Michael Bond and Alfred Bradley. A book of seven short play scripts based on the Paddington stories and intended for children to perform. The scripts were based on the play The Adventures of a Bear Called Paddington published by Samuel French. The plays included are: The Arrival of Paddington; Paddington Paints a Picture; Paddington has a Holiday; Paddington Visits the Dentist; Paddington Goes to the Launderette, Paddington Goes to the Hospital; Paddington Turns Detective. The book also contains costume notes and the lyrics of two songs: I Try So Hard and Paddington Bear.
3. Paddington Rules the Waves (2008). A £1 World Book Day Book.
4. Paddington Here and Now (2008). Published as part of the series' 50th-anniversary celebrations.
5. Paddington's Cookery Book (2011)

=== Blue Peter and beyond ===
Author Michael Bond was also a BBC TV cameraman who worked on the popular children's television programme Blue Peter. After this was revealed in 1965, a special Paddington story, in which he got mixed up in the programme itself, appeared in the Blue Peter Annuals for many years. They were collected in the novel-length Paddington's Blue Peter Story Book in 1973. A second book based around Blue Peter was titled Paddington on Screen.

== Television adaptations ==
=== Jackanory (1966) ===
The first TV adaptation of Paddington was a serialised reading of The Adventures of Paddington Bear by Thora Hird for Jackanory in 1966. The 15-minute episodes were broadcast over five afternoons from 14 March 1966. No episodes survive in the BBC archives.

=== Once Upon a Time (1968–1970) ===
ITV's answer to Jackanory was Once Upon a Time, which featured three readings by Ian Carmichael in 1968 and a fourth in 1970. The episodes do not survive in the ITV archives.

=== Jackanory (1970) ===
Christmas Eve 1970 saw a reading of Paddington's Christmas by John Bird. The episode no longer exists in the BBC archives.

=== Paddington (1976) ===
One of the best-known adaptations of Paddington Bear is the stop-motion animated BBC television series Paddington. The series was written by Michael Bond and directed and animated by Ivor Wood at London-based animation company FilmFair (now WildBrain). It was first broadcast on 5 January 1976. The storylines were based on comedic incidents from the books, chosen to appeal to the TV audience which included much younger children than those the books were written for.

This series had an extremely distinctive appearance: Paddington was a stop-motion puppet moving in a three-dimensional space in front of gloomy two-dimensional backgrounds, which were frequently sparse black-and-white line drawings, while all other characters were 2D drawings. In one scene, Mr Brown is seen to hand Paddington a jar of marmalade that becomes 3D when Paddington touches it. Animator Ivor Wood also worked on The Magic Roundabout, The Wombles and Postman Pat. The series was narrated by Michael Hordern, who also voiced all of the characters.

In the U.S., episodes aired on PBS, on the syndicated series Romper Room, on Nickelodeon as a segment on the programme Pinwheel and on USA Network as a segment on the Calliope (TV series) in the late 1970s and early 1980s, as well as in between preschool programming on The Disney Channel as a segment on the program Lunch Box from the late 1980s into the 1990s. The series also aired on HBO in between features, usually when they were airing children's programmes. The series won a silver medal at the New York Film and Television Festival in 1979, the first British animated series to do so.

Buena Vista Home Video released 6 volumes of episodes for NTSC/Region 1 Format:

1. Vol.1 Please Look After This Bear
2. Vol.2 Paddington, P. I.
3. Vol.3 All Paws
4. Vol.4 A Paddington Christmas
5. Vol.5 Backstage Bear
6. Vol.6 Bargain Basement Bear

In 2011, Mill Creek Entertainment under the licence of Cookie Jar Entertainment released the complete original 1975 Paddington Bear series on DVD. The 3-disc set also featured three half-hour television specials, "Paddington Birthday Bonanza", "Paddington Goes To School" and "Paddington Goes to the Movies" along with 15 bonus episodes of The Wombles and Huxley Pig. It also had special features for children on DVD-ROM.

=== Paddington Bear (1989) ===
Paddington Bear's 1989 television series was the first by a North American company, Hanna-Barbera, a co-production with Central Independent Television. This series was traditional two-dimensional animation and featured veteran voice actors Charlie Adler as Paddington and Tim Curry, fittingly enough, as Mr Curry. The character of an American boy named David, Jonathan and Judy Brown's cousin who arrived in London on the same day as Paddington, was added to the stories in the 1989 cartoon.

=== The Adventures of Paddington Bear (1997) ===
Canadian Cinar Films produced the third series, which was first broadcast in 1997 and consisted of traditional two-dimensional colour animation. The show was called The Adventures of Paddington Bear.

=== Children's Party at the Palace (2006) ===
Paddington appeared along with other British children's literature characters in the televised broadcast of Queen Elizabeth II's 80th birthday party event held in the Garden at Buckingham Palace on 25 June 2006. He has a part in The Queen's Handbag pantomime where he and Rupert Bear are recruited by Percy the Park Keeper to find the handbag alongside Winnie-the-Pooh, Kipper the Dog, Spot the Dog, Mowgli from The Jungle Book and The White Rabbit from Alice in Wonderland.

=== "The Official BBC Children in Need Medley" (2009) ===
Paddington Bear appeared in "The Official BBC Children in Need Medley" with Peter Kay along with several other animated characters, which included popular British children's TV characters Thomas the Tank Engine, Bob the Builder, Teletubbies, Peppa Pig and Thunderbirds. The single's cover art is a parody of the cover of Sgt. Pepper's Lonely Hearts Club Band by The Beatles. In the music video (which features the Animated All Star Band meeting and recording the song in a studio, spoofing other charity songs in the style of Band Aid's "Do They Know It's Christmas?") Paddington makes a grand appearance by winking at the cameramen when they take photos of him; Kay's character Big Chris tries to put a cloak on Paddington, but it keeps sliding off. He also joins the rest of the group for the final act. The song reached No. 1 on the UK Singles Chart.

=== The Adventures of Paddington (2019) ===
StudioCanal made an animated TV series based on the live-action Paddington films. The studio teamed with David Heyman and US Nickelodeon to make the series with animation studio Blue-Zoo, with the working title of Paddington and Ben Whishaw reprising the role from the two live-action films. The series officially made its debut on 20 December 2019.

== Film adaptations ==
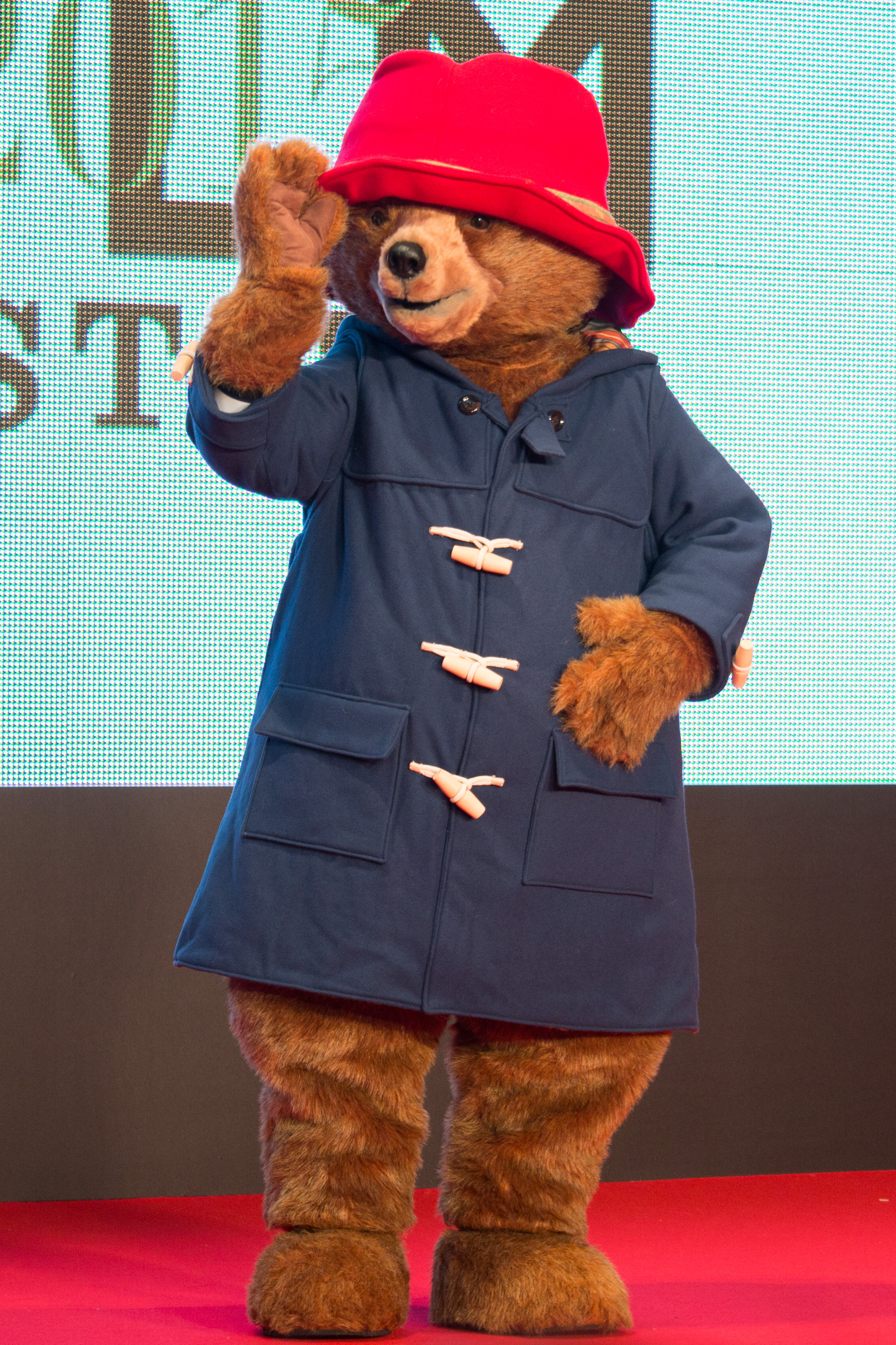
A Paddington Bear at the Tokyo International Film Festival in 2015

In September 2007, StudioCanal and producer David Heyman announced a film adaptation of Paddington Bear. Hamish McColl, who penned Mr. Bean's Holiday, would write the script with Paul King serving as co-writer and director. The film would not be an adaptation of an existing story, but "draw inspiration from the whole series" and features an animated Paddington Bear interacting with a live-action environment. It would be the first film the British visual-effects company Framestore had worked on with an animated animal as the lead character. Colin Firth had been announced to voice Paddington, however he announced his withdrawal on 17 June 2014, saying: "It's been bittersweet to see this delightful creature take shape and come to the sad realization that he simply doesn't have my voice". In July 2014, it was announced that Ben Whishaw had replaced Firth.

On 25 June 2012, an official teaser poster was released for Paddington, stating that it would be released during 2014. A trailer was subsequently released confirming the release to be 28 November 2014. On 17 November 2014, the British Board of Film Classification (BBFC) gave the film a PG certificate and advised parents that the film contained "dangerous behaviour, mild threat, mild sex references, [and] mild bad language". King told BBC reporter Tim Muffett: "I'm not surprised about that [the PG certificate] but I don't think it's a PG for sexiness. That I would find very odd". Paddington's creator, Michael Bond, said he was "totally amazed" at the BBFC's advice. After the film's distributor challenged the certification, the BBFC revised the wording of its parental guidance, replacing "mild sex references" with "innuendo". It also further qualified the "mild bad language" as "infrequent", saying it referred to "a single mumbled use of 'bloody'". Widely acclaimed by critics for its humour, screenplay, visual effects and appeal to children and adults, Paddington was nominated for the BAFTA Award for Outstanding British Film at the 68th British Academy Film Awards in 2015.

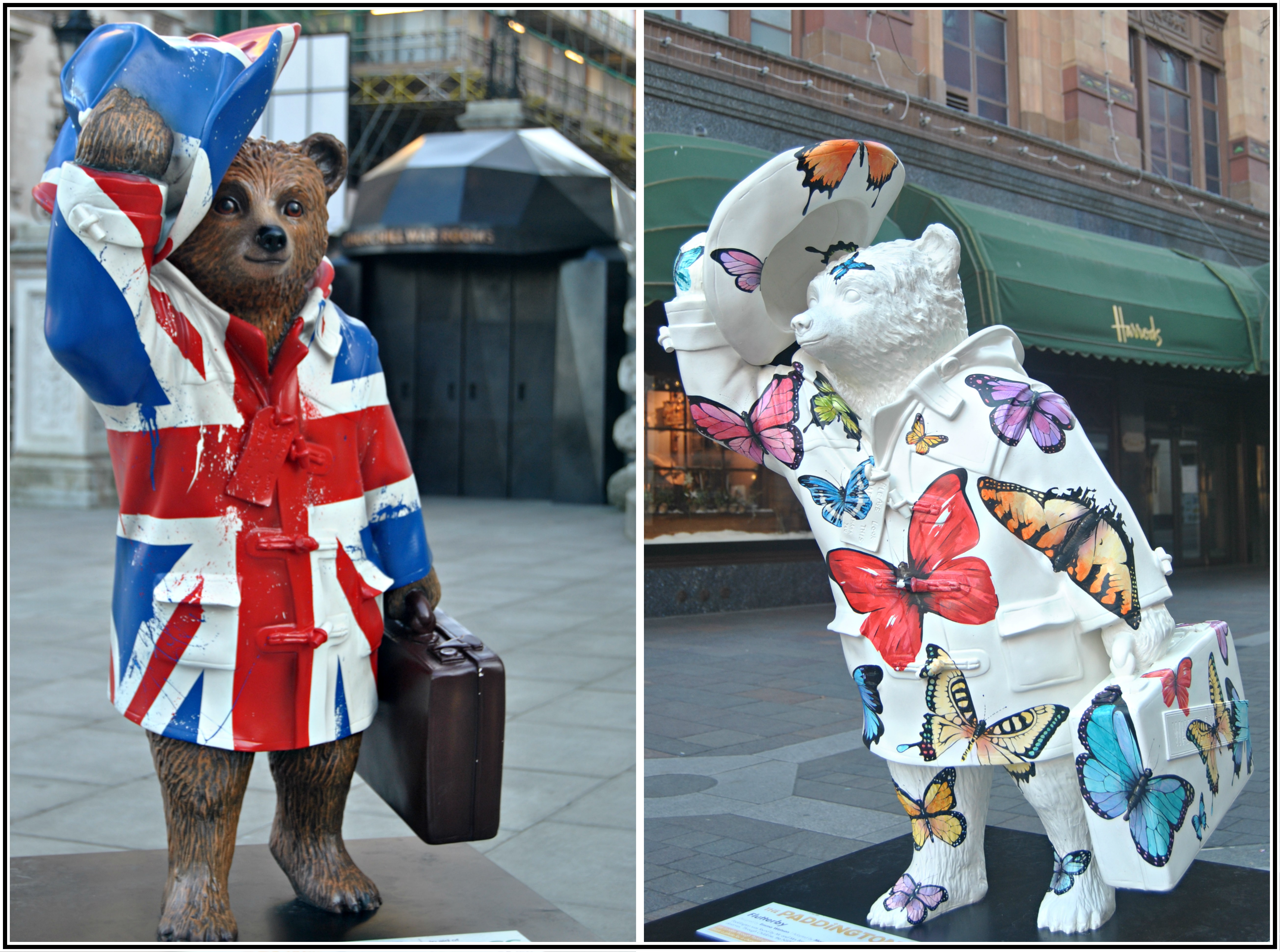
Two of the 50 Paddington Bears along 'The Paddington Trail' in London. The Union Jack design on the left was by the TV presenter Davina McCall, and the butterfly themed design on the right was by the actress Emma Watson.

To celebrate the release of the film, the Paddington Trail was launched. From 4 November until 30 December 2014, 50 Paddington statues were placed around London close to museums, parks, shops and key landmarks. The 3 ft 6 in (1.07 m) statues have been created by artists, designers and celebrities, including supermodel Kate Moss, actresses Nicole Kidman and Emma Watson, composer Andrew Lloyd Webber, footballer David Beckham, and actors Benedict Cumberbatch and Downton Abbey star Hugh Bonneville who also played Henry Brown. As the lead charity partner of The Paddington Trail, the National Society for the Prevention of Cruelty to Children (NSPCC) held an online auction in November and a live auction in December for the statues, with all proceeds from the sale going to the charity.

Following the success of Paddington, the studio announced it was in talks with the producer about a sequel. The sequel, Paddington 2, was released on 10 November 2017 in the UK to universal acclaim. The mantra from the film, "If we're kind and polite, the world will be right", was taught to Paddington by his beloved Aunt Lucy in times of both duress and joy. New cast members included Hugh Grant as Phoenix Buchanan, a narcissistic actor and former West End theatre star, reduced to making adverts for dog food, and Brendan Gleeson as Knuckles McGinty, the short-tempered prison cook. On 18 January 2018, Paddington 2 became the most-reviewed film ever to remain at 100% on Rotten Tomatoes, with 164 positive reviews, beating Toy Story 2, which had 163 positive reviews at the time.

Comedian and later President of Ukraine Volodymyr Zelenskyy voiced Paddington in the Ukrainian dubbing of the films Paddington (2014) and Paddington 2 (2017). Upon hearing of this, Bonneville tweeted "Thank you, President Zelensky" at the outbreak of the Russian invasion of Ukraine in February 2022.

A third film in the series, Paddington in Peru, began filming in July 2023. As well as recurring cast members it also stars Emily Mortimer, Antonio Banderas and Olivia Colman. The film premiered in London on 3 November 2024 and was released in cinemas on 8 November 2024 in the United Kingdom.

== Stage adaptations ==
=== Paddington Bear's Magical Musical (1983) ===
A musical written by Shirlie Roden and produced by Bill Kenwright opened at the Hexagon Theatre, Reading prior to a UK tour.

=== Paddington: The Musical (2025) ===
In December 2023, it was announced that Paddington: The Musical, adapted from the books and the film series, is being developed for the stage, with McFly's Tom Fletcher set to write the music and lyrics with Jessica Swale writing the book. Set to open in the UK in 2025, its producers said it was a "privilege to be creating a new musical about this gorgeous and beloved little bear". It premiered at the Savoy Theatre in the West End on 1 November 2025. The production was a critical and commercial success, being nominated for eleven Olivier Awards and winning seven. The musical will premiere on Broadway in 2027 at the Al Hirschfeld Theatre.

The stage version features a 1.2-metre (3 ft 11 in) tall Paddington Bear puppet, designed and brought to life by Tahra Zafar. Paddington is performed simultaneously by two performers, Arti Shah, who physically plays the bear on stage, and James Hameed, who remotely puppeteers his facial expressions and provides the bear's voice.

== Reception and analysis ==
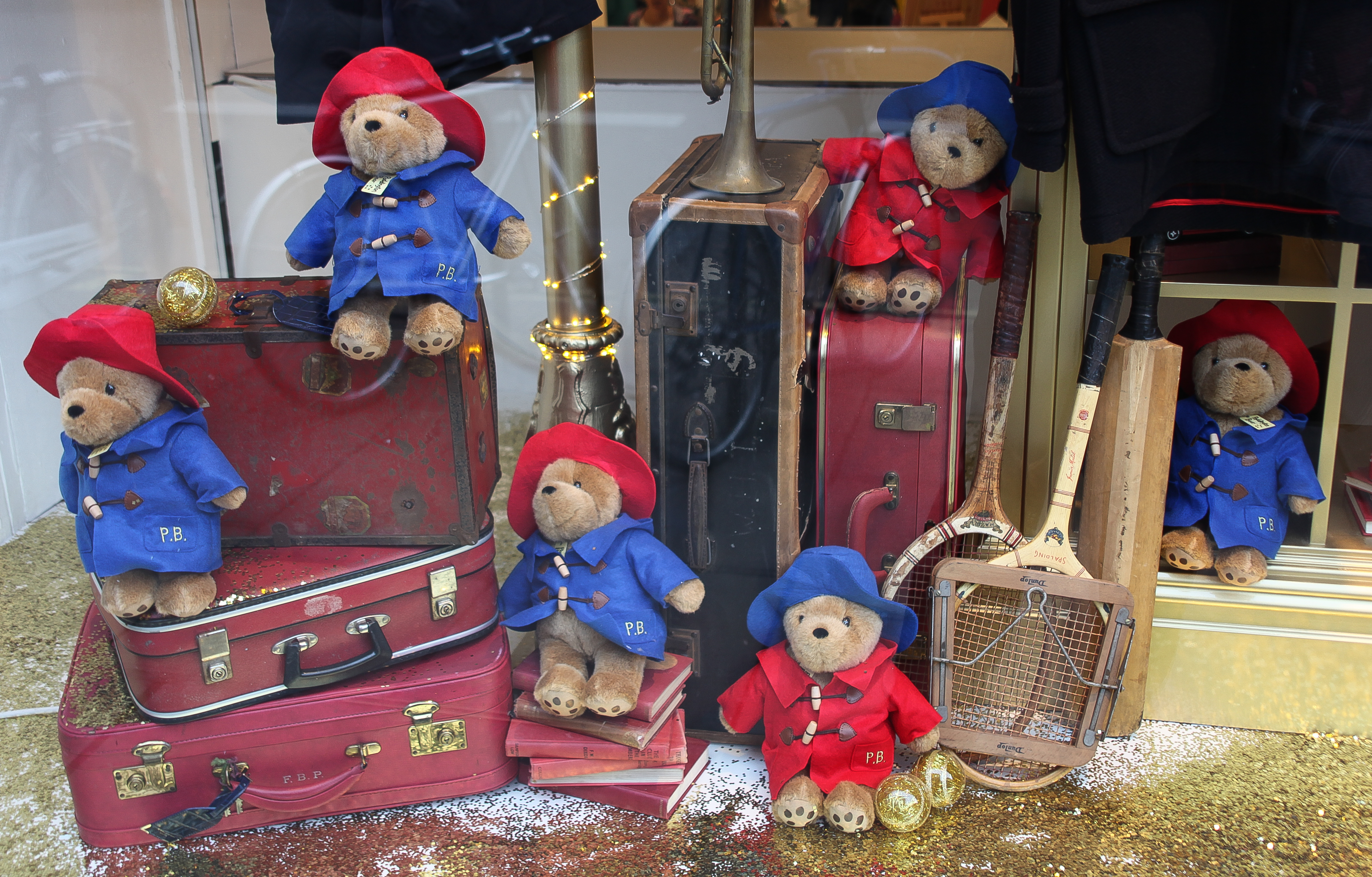
A popular fictional character in retail, Paddington stuffed toys featured in the Christmas shopwindow at Selfridges department store in London to coincide with the release of the 2014 film Paddington

Paddington Bear is among the most popular characters in children's literature. The actor Stephen Fry, who narrated Paddington audiobooks, stated "Michael Bond's bear is a Great British icon with his charm, humour, spirit of adventure and generosity". Devan Coggan writing for Entertainment Weekly saw a similarity between Paddington and Winnie-the-Pooh, referring to them as two "extremely polite British bears without pants", adding that "both bears share a philosophy of kindness and integrity".

The New York Times praised the original book A Bear Called Paddington (1958). Similarly, The Horn Book Guide, a bimonthly magazine dedicated to reviewing children's literature, praised the short story Paddington Helps Out (1960). Both articles emphasise the welcoming Brown family and how the book captures Paddington's adventurous, charming, and funny attitude. Further, The New York Times' article highlights the resemblance of Paddington to a child, indicating that 6 to 9 year olds could enjoy both the colourful illustrations and the book's content.

"The magic of Paddington is that, through his wide-eyed innocence, he sees the very best in humanity, reminding us that love and kindness can triumph if we open our hearts and minds to one another."

— Sonia Friedman and Eliza Lumley speaking to the BBC in 2023.

In 2021, the British Library hosted an exhibition on Paddington Bear. The Telegraph journalist Claire Allfree acknowledges Paddington's difficulty as an immigrant to integrate into British culture. For example, that "children should practise their own hard stares and to imagine what objects they might take with them on their long journey." Scholars Angela Smith, Kyle Grayson and Lisa Dussenberry additionally discuss the role of Otherness in the Paddington series. Smith writes that though children will be able to subtly learn the complex political and psychological issues of migration, Paddington nonetheless enforces assimilation to the dominant culture. Grayson posits that even with specific negotiations of differences, Paddington remains in a precarious position in society. On a positive tone about Paddington's immigration theme, Dussenberry appreciates how Mr Gruber, a Hungarian immigrant and Paddington's friend, supports and guides Paddington with his adjustment into the new society.

On 2nd March 2025 two RAF engineers vandalised and stole a statue of Paddington in Newbury, Berkshire. At their sentencing, the judge noted that Paddington "represents kindness, tolerance and promotes integration and acceptance in our society" and that their actions were "the antithesis of everything Paddington stands for".

== In popular culture ==
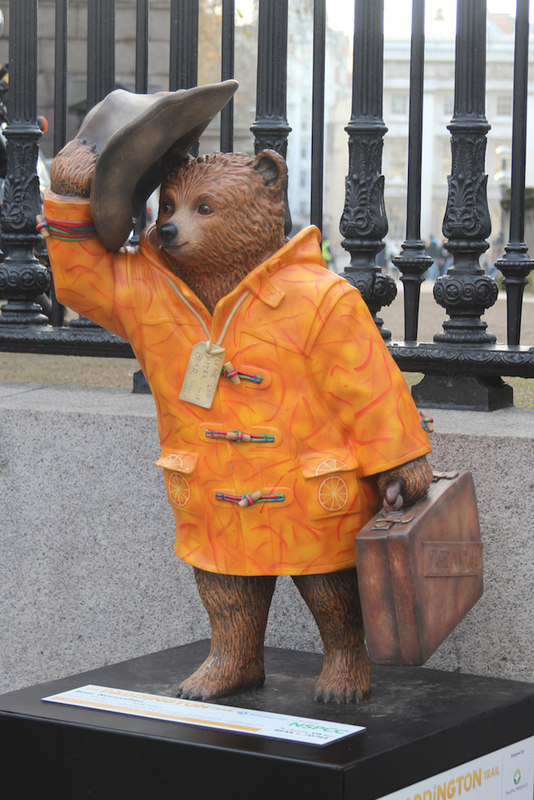
Paddington's love of marmalade sandwiches—referenced in this marmalade-themed Paddington statue designed by the actor John Hurt—saw him appear in marketing for Robertson's golden shred.

Cadbury launched a Paddington Bear branded chocolate bar in 1977. Paddington was featured on the Royal Mail 1st class stamp in the Animal Tales series released on 10 January 2006 and had previously been featured on one of the 1st class Greetings Messages stamps, released by Royal Mail on 1 February 1994.

Paddington Bear featured in the Marmite television advertisement (first broadcast in the UK on 13 September 2007), in which he tries a marmite and cheese sandwich instead of his traditional marmalade sandwich.

Paddington Bear audiobooks have been read by a number of celebrities. In 2007, Stephen Fry narrated the audiobook More About Paddington (1959), and in 2008 he received the Audie Award for Young Listeners' Title from the Audio Publishers Association in the U.S.

On 13 October 2008, Google celebrated the 50th anniversary of the first Paddington publication by placing an image of the travelling bear with a sign showing Peru and London incorporated into a Google Doodle.

In 2010, Paddington Bear was first used in marketing for Robertson's, appearing on the jars of their Golden Shred marmalade. In November 2014, a balloon with Paddington Bear was introduced in the Macy's Thanksgiving Day Parade. A song about Paddington Bear, "Shine" was released on 13 January 2015 by Gwen Stefani and Pharrell Williams, to coincide with the U.S. release of Paddington.

As part of the promotion of film and to celebrate cross-cultural links between the UK and Peru, the British Embassy and StudioCanal commissioned a statue of Paddington in Parque Salazar in the Miraflores district of the Peruvian capital, Lima, which was unveiled in July 2015.

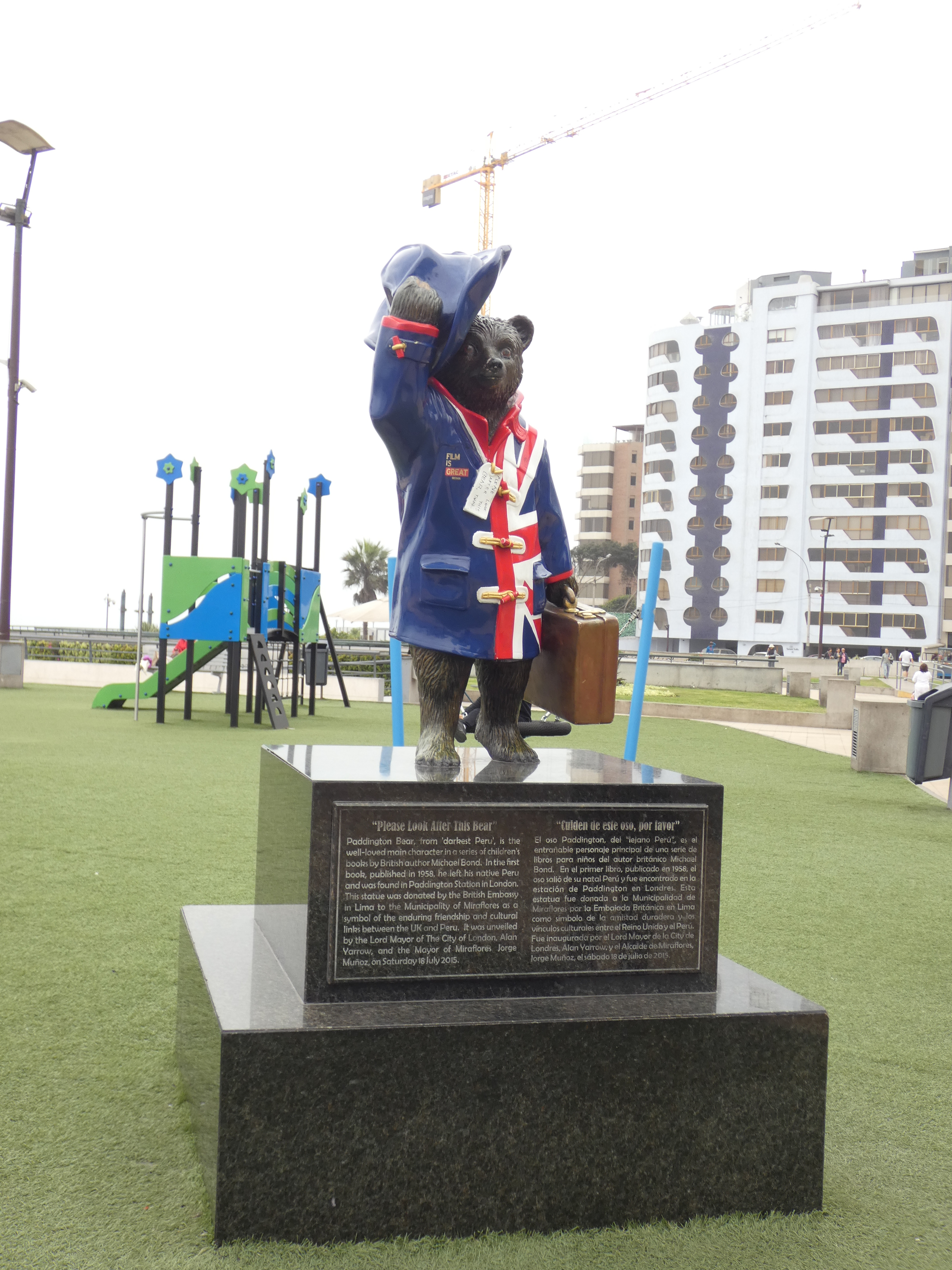
Statue of Paddington, donated by the British Embassy in Lima, in Parque Salazar, Miraflores, Lima

The 2017, Marks & Spencer Christmas advertisement for television shows Paddington mistaking a petty criminal for Santa Claus and helping him right the wrong by returning the gifts to their rightful owners.

Marking the 60th anniversary of the publication of the first Paddington children's book, in 2018 an image of Paddington Bear (sitting at Paddington station) appeared on 50p coins in the UK. His creator Michael Bond was the second author to have their character feature on the coin after Beatrix Potter whose literary creation Peter Rabbit appeared two years earlier.

In the 2022 film The Unbearable Weight of Massive Talent, Paddington 2 was referenced when the characters Javi (Pedro Pascal) and Nicolas Cage (Nicolas Cage) were discussing their favourite movies. When asked why Paddington 2 was referred to, director Tom Gormican said "It's a perfect movie...we were big fans" and Cage described it as "wonderful".

In a pre-recorded comedy segment at the opening of the Platinum Party at the Palace on 4 June 2022, Paddington joined Queen Elizabeth II for tea and marmalade sandwiches at Buckingham Palace before they tapped their tea cups to the beat of "We Will Rock You", prior to Queen + Adam Lambert performing the song outside live. During their meeting, the Queen reveals to Paddington that she too always keeps a marmalade sandwich for emergencies, in her handbag. The video would turn out to be one of the last public appearances of Elizabeth II before her death on 8 September 2022, and as a result Paddington Bear became a symbol of mourning for the Queen. An image of Paddington and the Queen walking hand-in-hand was widely shared and re-printed, mourners left stuffed Paddington Bears and marmalade sandwiches at memorials, and the BBC announced that both Paddington films would air on the weekend of the funeral. Over 1,000 Paddington Bears and other teddy bears that were left as memorials at Royal Residences were collected, professionally cleaned, and donated to Barnardo's children's services. The film featuring Paddington and the Queen won the Memorable Moment Award at the 2023 BAFTA Television Awards.

In 2024, to promote the release of Paddington in Peru, StudioCanal created a Letterboxd account for the character, making Paddington look like he seemingly joined the platform to share reviews of his favourite films, including Top Hat (1935), Modern Times (1936), The Wizard of Oz (1939), Meet Me in St. Louis (1944), It's a Wonderful Life (1946), Mary Poppins (1964), Willy Wonka & the Chocolate Factory (1971), My Neighbor Totoro (1988), Home Alone (1990), March of the Penguins (2005), The Secret Life of Walter Mitty (2013) and Shaun the Sheep Movie (2015).

In November 2025, William, Prince of Wales and Catherine, Princess of Wales met with Paddington back stage at that year's Royal Variety Performance held at the Royal Albert Hall during which they discussed marmalade sandwiches.
