= Paddington in Peru =

2024 film by Dougal Wilson

- UK theatrical release poster
- Directed by: Dougal Wilson
- Screenplay by: Mark Burton; Jon Foster; James Lamont
- Story by: Paul King; Simon Farnaby; Mark Burton
- Based on: Paddington Bear by Michael Bond
- Produced by: Rosie Alison
- Starring: Hugh Bonneville; Emily Mortimer; Julie Walters; Jim Broadbent; Carla Tous; Olivia Colman; Antonio Banderas; Ben Whishaw
- Cinematography: Erik Wilson
- Edited by: Úna Ní Dhonghaíle
- Music by: Dario Marianelli
- Production companies: StudioCanal; Marmalade Pictures
- Distributed by: StudioCanal (United Kingdom and France); Columbia Pictures and Stage 6 Films (United States; through Sony Pictures Releasing)
- Release dates: 8 November 2024 (United Kingdom); 5 February 2025 (France); 14 February 2025 (United States)
- Running time: 106 minutes
- Countries: United Kingdom; France; United States
- Language: English
- Budget: $75–90 million
- Box office: $211 million

Paddington in Peru is a 2024 British live-action animated adventure comedy film directed by Dougal Wilson and written by Mark Burton, Jon Foster, and James Lamont. It is the sequel to Paddington 2 (2017) and the third installment in the Paddington film series, which is based on the Paddington stories by Michael Bond. The film, a British-French-American co-production, stars Hugh Bonneville, Emily Mortimer, Julie Walters, Olivia Colman, Antonio Banderas and Ben Whishaw as the voice of Paddington. The film follows Paddington and the Brown family as they return to Paddington's home country of Peru, where they travel through the jungle to find Aunt Lucy.

The film entered development in February 2021, and the title Paddington in Peru was announced in June 2022. It is the feature film debut of Wilson. Principal photography took place between July and October 2023, in the United Kingdom, Colombia and Peru.

Paddington in Peru was released in cinemas in the United Kingdom by StudioCanal on 8 November 2024, in France on 5 February 2025 and in the United States by Sony Pictures Releasing on 14 February 2025. It grossed $211 million and received positive reviews from critics. A fourth film is in development.

== Plot ==
After the events of the previous film, Paddington Bear is given a passport and an umbrella by his neighbours at 32 Windsor Gardens.

Despite living in the same house, the Brown family has drifted apart. Judy is applying for admission to university, and Jonathan spends most of his free time relaxing in his room. Mrs. Brown has started working on a new art project, while Mrs. Bird tackles her long to-do list and Mr. Brown deals with his new boss from the United States who encourages him to take more risks.

Paddington receives a letter from the Home for Retired Bears in Peru, informing him that his aunt Lucy is acting strangely and deeply misses him, so Paddington and the Browns decide to travel to Peru to visit her. Upon their arrival, the Browns learn from the Reverend Mother that Lucy has gone missing in the Amazon rainforest, leaving behind only her glasses and her bracelet. Paddington finds a map in Lucy's cabin highlighting a location named Rumi Rock and decides to travel there to start his search, taking Lucy's bracelet with him. Mrs. Bird stays behind with the Reverend Mother, who gifts Mrs. Brown a pendant for good luck.

Looking to hire a boat to travel down the river, the Browns meet riverboat captain Hunter Cabot and his daughter Gina. Hunter notices Paddington's bracelet and informs the family of El Dorado, a mythical city said to contain the gold offered by ancient Peruvians to the jungle spirits. Hunter warns Paddington that travelers in search of El Dorado typically begin their searches at Rumi Rock, but do not return alive. It is later revealed that Hunter is driven by the ghosts of his ancestors to find gold at any cost, and plans to hijack the trip to find El Dorado himself; he argues with Gina about continuing the journey, with Gina wanting him to turn back. Hunter responds by throwing Gina off the boat, but then falls overboard himself, causing the boat to shipwreck.

In the ensuing confusion, Paddington is separated from the Browns and stumbles upon Rumi Rock, where he finds Hunter waiting for him. After hearing roars that Paddington believes are calls and responses from himself and Lucy, Hunter sets off with Paddington in search of Lucy and El Dorado. Meanwhile, Gina finds the Browns and explains her father's motivations and family history; they set out to find Paddington and save him from Hunter. Mrs. Bird grows suspicious of the Reverend Mother and follows her into a secret room, where she reveals that the pendant she gave to Mrs. Brown is actually a tracker. Now knowing their location, Mrs Bird and the Reverend Mother fly a plane into the forest to rescue the Browns.

Hunter and Paddington reach the summit of an Incan fort, which contains a slot that matches the emblem on Paddington's bracelet. Hoping to take the bracelet for himself, Hunter attacks and chases Paddington, but the Browns arrive just in time to save him. The Reverend Mother arrives and reveals herself to be Clarissa Cabot, Hunter's long-lost cousin who faked her death and also wishes to find El Dorado. Clarissa further reveals that she staged Lucy's disappearance to lure Paddington to Peru, and holds the Browns and Gina at gunpoint. Hunter intervenes and incapacitates Clarissa, ridding himself of the visions of his ancestors. The Browns use Paddington's bracelet to enter El Dorado, where they find Lucy, who explains that El Dorado is an orangery where Paddington was born. She says that her bracelet originally belonged to Paddington and the bears of El Dorado. Paddington bonds with the other bears making marmalade, but ultimately chooses to return to London with the Browns.

Afterwards, Hunter reconciles with Gina and gives up his obsession with gold. Clarissa is sent to the North Pole to become a real nun and work at the Home for Retired Polar Bears, much to her dismay. Several bears from El Dorado visit Paddington in London, and are named after other London rail stations. Paddington and the bears visit convicted actor Phoenix Buchanan in prison. Believing that he will soon be released, Buchanan plans a production of "Goldilocks and the Three Bears" starring the El Dorado bears.

== Cast ==
- Hugh Bonneville as Henry Brown
- Emily Mortimer as Mary Brown
- Julie Walters as Mrs Bird
- Jim Broadbent as Samuel Gruber
- Madeleine Harris as Judy Brown
- Samuel Joslin as Jonathan Brown
- Imelda Staunton as the voice of Aunt Lucy
- Carla Tous as Gina Cabot
- Olivia Colman as Clarissa Cabot / the Reverend Mother
- Antonio Banderas as Hunter Cabot
- Ben Whishaw as the voice of Paddington Brown
- Joel Fry as Joe, the postman
- Robbie Gee as Mr Barnes
- Sanjeev Bhaskar as Dr Jafri
- Ben Miller as Colonel Lancaster
- Jessica Hynes as Miss Kitts
- Hayley Atwell as Madison
- Aloreia Spencer as Madison's assistant
- Simon Farnaby as Barry, the flight attendant
- Ella Bruccoleri as Rosita

Hugh Grant (credited as Phoenix Buchanan) reprises his role from the second film as Phoenix Buchanan in a cameo appearance.

== Production ==
=== Development ===
In June 2016, the then StudioCanal CEO Didier Lupfer stated that the studio was committed to making a third Paddington film. In November 2017, David Heyman told Digital Spy that though the script for a third film had not been developed, discussions about locations, ideas and scenes had already begun. In November 2018, Heyman noted that a third film was likely to happen, but that Paul King would not be back to direct, though he would still be involved in a prominent creative capacity. In February 2021, Paddington 3 officially began development.

In July 2021, StudioCanal announced that Paddington 3 would begin shooting in the first quarter of 2022. The story for the third film was written by King, Simon Farnaby, and Mark Burton, and the screenplay by Burton, Jon Foster and James Lamont. The story was influenced by the Werner Herzog films Aguirre, the Wrath of God and Fitzcarraldo, due to such films showcasing Peru's incredible variety of landscapes, crazy geology, friendly people and its mysterious Inca mythology, with a Peruvian legend underlying the whole plot and the characters donning traditional-looking clothes in the rural Andes despite contending with modern mopeds and mobile phones. In June 2022, the film's title Paddington in Peru and Dougal Wilson as director were announced, with principal photography now set to begin 2023. It is the feature film directorial debut of Wilson, who previously directed commercials and music videos. In February 2023, Paddington voice actor Ben Whishaw stated that he had yet to read a script and was unsure whether development was continuing. By April, the film was confirmed to still be in development.

=== Casting and filming ===
In June, it was announced that Whishaw, Hugh Bonneville, Julie Walters, Jim Broadbent, Madeleine Harris, Samuel Joslin and Imelda Staunton were set to reprise their roles from the previous films, with Olivia Colman, Antonio Banderas, Rachel Zegler and Emily Mortimer added to the cast. Mortimer replaced Sally Hawkins who played Mrs Brown in the first two films.

Filming commenced in the United Kingdom on 24 July as planned, despite reports that it was delayed due to the 2023 SAG-AFTRA strike. The film was also shot in Colombia and Peru. Filming began without Zegler as she had left for the United States to participate in picketing during the strike; Carla Tous later took over the role of Gina Cabot, as Zegler was unable to commit due to the strike. Filming was completed in October 2023.

Queen Elizabeth II briefly appears in the film in a framed photograph with Paddington, taken from the short film featuring the two produced for the Platinum Jubilee of Elizabeth II. Michael Bond also appears briefly on a stamp in a letter Paddington receives at the start of the film.

Hugh Grant reprised his Paddington 2 role of Phoenix Buchanan in a post-credits scene due to Wilson, while acknowledging he could not be in the film's story due to the setting, and the crew loving him and feeling it was a "Paddington thing" to do for the title character to forgive Buchanan. Grant loved the idea and helped them write the scene.

=== Post-production ===
Visual effects for the film were provided by Framestore. The music was composed by Dario Marianelli, who previously composed the score for the second film.

== Marketing ==
In a brand tie-in, Jo Malone released a limited edition Paddington-themed marmalade cologne in early July 2024.

The song "Adventure" by Yoasobi was used as the theme song for the Japanese release of the film.

=== Paddington Visits statue trail ===
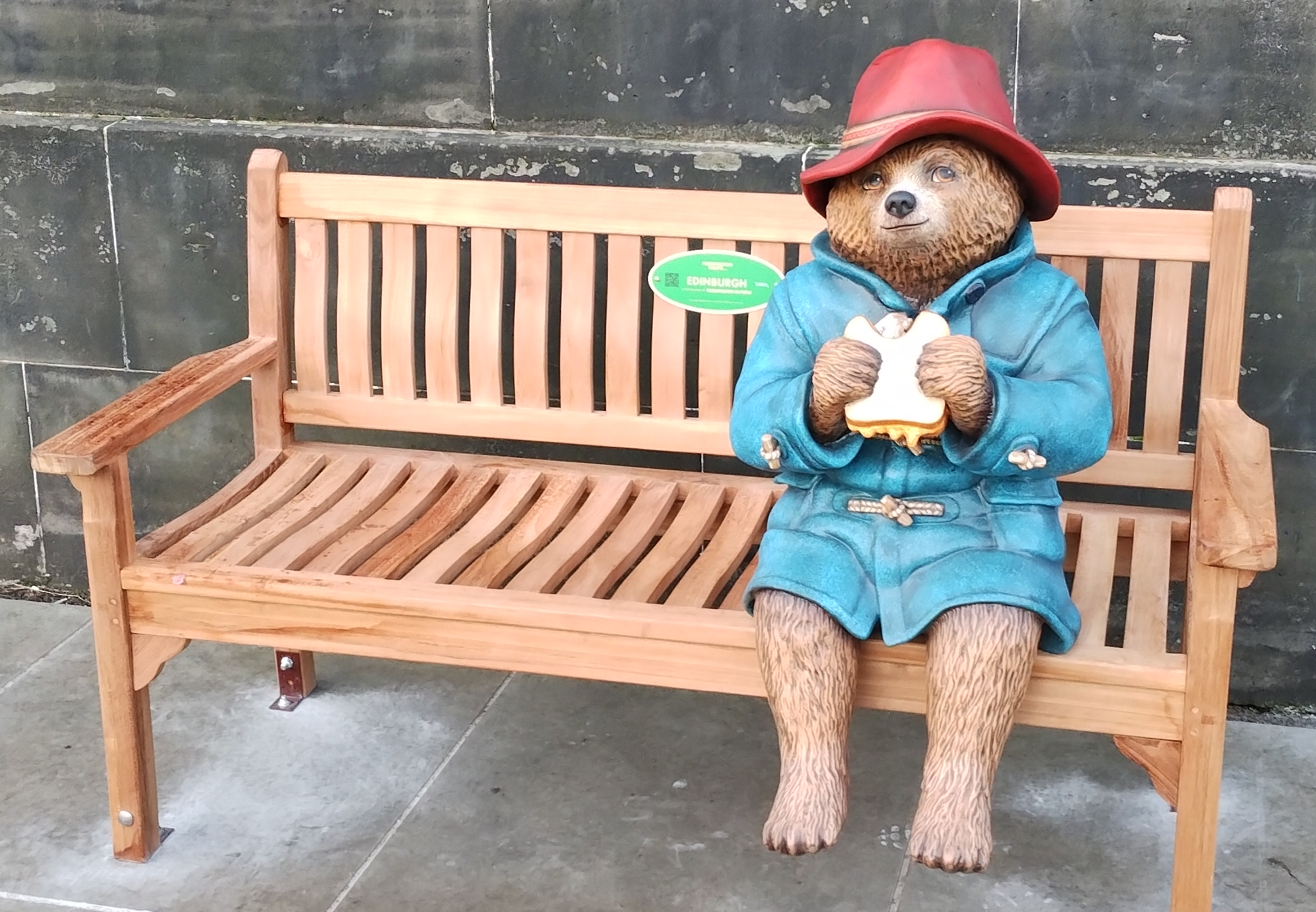
One of the statues was placed on a bench in St Andrew Square, Edinburgh

A series of Paddington statues were placed across parts of the UK and Ireland from early October to promote the film. This initially took place in 23 locations.

In the early hours of 2 March 2025 on Northbrook Street in Newbury, Berkshire, the home town of Michael Bond, the front half of one of these statues was removed from its bench by Daniel Heath and William Lawrence, engineers who had been based at RAF Odiham. They took the half of the statue back to the base in a taxi, temporarily posting it on Facebook Marketplace before hiding it in Lawrence's car where it was found by police. The half of Paddington on the bench was covered, partly to prevent it upsetting children. At Heath and Lawrence's trial, the judge said their actions were "the antithesis of everything Paddington stands for." They were ordered to carry out unpaid work and each pay £2,725 to cover repair costs.

== Release ==
Paddington in Peru had its world premiere in London on 3 November 2024, and was released in cinemas in the United Kingdom on 8 November. It was originally set to be released in the United States and other territories on 17 January 2025, until it was delayed in the United States to 14 February.

=== Distribution ===
In May 2023, StudioCanal sold a majority of territories including North America to Sony Pictures for distribution. StudioCanal holds the distribution rights for the United Kingdom, France, Germany, Australia, New Zealand, the Benelux and Poland, while Sony will distribute the film elsewhere except for China, Japan and Russia.

=== Home video ===
In the United Kingdom, StudioCanal released Paddington in Peru on DVD, Blu-ray and 4K Ultra HD Blu-ray on 17 February 2025. An HMV-exclusive limited collector's edition, titled The Box of Adventure, included a replica of Paddington's suitcase containing art cards, posters and other collectibles, alongside exclusive artwork.

== Reception ==
=== Box office ===
Paddington in Peru grossed $45.8 million in the United States and Canada, and $165.2 million in other territories (including $48.2 million in the United Kingdom), for a worldwide total of $211 million.

In the United Kingdom, Paddington in Peru had the biggest opening weekend for a British film since No Time to Die in 2021, earning £9.65 million ($12.4 million), the highest opening of the franchise. Additionally, the film had the third highest UK opening of 2024, behind Deadpool & Wolverine (£17.2 million) and Inside Out 2 (£11.3 million).

In the United States and Canada, the film was released alongside Captain America: Brave New World and was projected to gross $15–17 million from 3,890 theaters in its four-day opening weekend. The film made $5.1 million on its first day, including $600,000 from Thursday previews. It went on to debut to $13 million (and a total of $16 million over the four days), finishing second behind Brave New World. In its second weekend the film made $6.5 million (a drop of 49%), finishing in third. It dropped out of the box office top ten in its sixth weekend.

=== Critical response ===
On the review aggregator website Rotten Tomatoes, 93% of 193 critics' reviews are positive. The website's consensus reads: "Paddington in Peru whisks away cinema's politest bear to a fresh setting under new creative stewardship, delivering a most agreeable adventure for the whole family." Metacritic, which uses a weighted average, assigned the film a score of 65 out of 100, based on 46 critics, indicating "generally favorable" reviews. Audiences polled by CinemaScore gave the film an average grade of "A" on an A+ to F scale, the same as the first two films, while PostTrak reported an average rating of 4 out of 5 stars.

Peter Bradshaw of The Guardian awarded the film 3 stars out of 5 while stating: "This Paddington threequel is a perfectly decent bet for the holidays, and never anything other than entertaining, but the gag density has thinned out and removing Paddington from Blighty, though making perfect narrative and dramatic sense, and in tune with the franchise's admirable opposition to parochialism and xenophobia, is a slightly shark-jumping move, like a special episode of a TV sitcom that takes the cast to the Costa del Sol."

Stewart Heritage in The Guardian considered the film, compared to earlier Paddington films, "a bit of a damp squib ... [but] leagues better than any of the recent live-action Disney remakes". He commented that there was a moment where the film "touched greatness", a mid-credit sequence where a huge number of bears introduce themselves to Phoenix Buchanan (Hugh Grant). According to the film's director, Grant wrote much of that scene himself. Heritage commented that Grant (a former writer of radio advertisements) has written several scenes in films he appeared in, very successfully.

=== Accolades ===
At the 2025 Nominee Imagen Awards, Antonio Banderas was nominated for Best Actor. At the 2025 Irish Film and Television Awards, Úna Ní Dhonghaíle was nominated for Best Editing. At the 2025 Kids' Choice Awards USA, it was nominated for Favorite Movie. At the 2025 Golden Trailer Awards, it was nominated for Best Animation/Family TV Spot. At the 2025 International Film Music Critics Award, Dario Marianelli was nominated for Best Original Score for a Comedy Film. At the 2025 Heartland Film, the director Dougal Wilson won the Truly Moving Picture Award. At the 2025 BFE Cut Above Awards, Úna Ní Dhonghaíle was nominated for Best Edited British Drama. At the 2024 Digital Spy Reader Awards, it won Best British Movie, it came in 4th place for Best Movie overall, and the "A surprise return" moment came in 4th place for Most Mind-Blowing Movie Moment. At the 2026 Movieguide Awards (which are still pending), it has been nominated for the Faith and Freedom Award and Best Movie for Children.

== Future ==
During the Brand Licensing Europe 2024 convention in London, Canal+ announced it was working on a fourth Paddington film, estimated to be released in 2027 or 2028. In May 2026, it was announced that Armando Iannucci and Simon Blackwell would write the script, with Wilson in talks to return as director right after he directs Disney's Heffalumps and Woozles.
