= Paddington 2 =

2017 film by Paul King

- UK theatrical release poster
- Directed by: Paul King
- Written by: Paul King; Simon Farnaby
- Based on: Paddington Bear by Michael Bond
- Produced by: David Heyman
- Starring: Hugh Bonneville; Sally Hawkins; Brendan Gleeson; Julie Walters; Jim Broadbent; Peter Capaldi; Hugh Grant; Ben Whishaw
- Cinematography: Erik Alexander Wilson
- Edited by: Mark Everson; Jonathan Amos
- Music by: Dario Marianelli
- Production companies: StudioCanal; Heyday Films; Anton Capital Entertainment
- Distributed by: StudioCanal (United Kingdom and France)
- Release dates: 5 November 2017 (London); 10 November 2017 (United Kingdom); 6 December 2017 (France)
- Running time: 104 minutes
- Countries: United Kingdom; France; Luxembourg
- Language: English
- Budget: $40 million
- Box office: $290.1 million

Paddington 2 is a 2017 live-action animated comedy film directed by Paul King from a screenplay written by King and Simon Farnaby. Based on the stories of Paddington Bear created by Michael Bond (to whom the film is also dedicated), it is the sequel to Paddington (2014) and the second installment in the Paddington film series. It is a British-French-Luxembourgish co-production and stars Ben Whishaw as the voice of Paddington, with Hugh Bonneville, Sally Hawkins, Brendan Gleeson, Julie Walters, Jim Broadbent, Peter Capaldi and Hugh Grant in live-action roles. The film follows Paddington as he is framed and imprisoned for a burglary he did not commit. To free him, the Brown family must find the real culprit and prove his innocence.

The film was confirmed to be in development in April 2015. Principal photography began in October 2016 and ended in June 2017. It was theatrically released on 10 November 2017 in the United Kingdom and on 6 December in France, and grossed $290 million.

Paddington 2 received critical acclaim and was nominated for three BAFTAs: Outstanding British Film, Best Adapted Screenplay and Best Supporting Actor, for Grant. A third film, Paddington in Peru, was released in 2024.

== Plot ==
Having found an adopted home with the Brown family in Windsor Gardens, London, (Note: As depicted in Paddington (2014)) Paddington begins working to buy a pop-up book of London in Samuel Gruber's antique shop for his aunt Lucy's 100th birthday, working as a window cleaner and saving his wages. One night, he witnesses a burglary at the shop, in which the book is stolen. Paddington pursues the thief, but is framed and arrested, and the thief—the Browns' neighbour, actor Phoenix Buchanan—escapes with the book. With no evidence of the thief's existence, Paddington is convicted and sentenced to ten years in prison.

Knuckles McGinty, the prison chef, recruits Paddington to work in the kitchen after inadvertently tasting one of his marmalade sandwiches. Meanwhile, the Browns, seeking to exonerate Paddington, put up sketches of the thief all over London, while Buchanan uses clues within the book to locate a hidden fortune. Growing suspicious of Buchanan, Mary and Henry break into his house, where they discover a secret attic filled with numerous costumes, including the one he wore during the burglary. They present the evidence to the police, who decline it. Meanwhile, Paddington believes that the Browns have forgotten him when they miss a visit.

Paddington and Knuckles, along with two other inmates Phibs and Spoon, escape the prison at midnight. While Paddington's fellow escapees had initially promised to help prove his innocence, they later reveal that their true intention is to flee the country, prompting Paddington to abandon them. Paddington uses a public telephone to contact the Browns, who inform him that Buchanan is the real thief. Aiming to expose Buchanan, they arrange to meet at Paddington station, where a carnival train carrying the hidden fortune is due to depart.

Paddington, disguising himself as a litter bin, boards the train immediately before it leaves, and the Browns follow him in an LNER Peppercorn Class A1. Buchanan locks Paddington inside the train's brake van and severs the coupling, but is then subdued by Henry. The brake van rolls into a nearby river with Paddington trapped inside, but Knuckles, Phibs, and Spoon arrive to help Mary save Paddington.

Paddington falls into a coma, but wakes up on Aunt Lucy's birthday to find himself at home. He learns that he has been exonerated, Buchanan has been arrested, and the police have taken the book as evidence. Much to his delight, he also discovers that the Browns and their neighbours have arranged transport from Peru for Aunt Lucy to visit London in person.

== Cast ==
- Hugh Bonneville as Henry Brown, the Browns' patriarch, Mary's husband, Judy and Jonathan's father, and the adoptive father of Paddington.
- Sally Hawkins as Mary Brown, Henry's wife, Judy and Jonathan's mother, and Paddington's adoptive mother. This is the last film in the series where Hawkins portrayed Mary Brown before Emily Mortimer took over the role for the next film.
- Brendan Gleeson as Knuckles McGinty, a chef of Portobello Prison whom Paddington befriends
- Julie Walters as Mrs Bird, the housekeeper of the Brown residence
- Jim Broadbent as Mr Samuel Gruber, the owner of an antique shop
- Peter Capaldi as Mr Reginald Curry, the Brown family's cranky neighbour
- Madeleine Harris as Judy Brown, Henry and Mary's daughter, Jonathan's sister, and Paddington's adoptive sister
- Samuel Joslin as Jonathan "J-Dog" Brown, Henry and Mary's son, Judy's brother, and Paddington's adoptive brother
- Dame Eileen Atkins as Madame Kozlova, the owner of the fair
- Imelda Staunton as the voice of Lucy, Paddington's aunt
- Michael Gambon as the voice of Pastuzo, Lucy's late husband, and Paddington's late uncle
- Tom Conti as Gerald Biggleswade, a judge, who is a customer at Giuseppe's Grooming Salon
- Joanna Lumley as Felicity Fanshaw
- Noah Taylor as Miguel Phibs, a prisoner
- Aaron Neil as Raul "Spoon" Spooner, a prisoner
- Jessica Hynes as Miss Kitts, a newspaper seller
- Ben Miller as Colonel Lancaster, Miss Kitts' lover
- Sanjeev Bhaskar as Dr Jafri, the Brown family's next-door neighbour who always forgets his keys
- Robbie Gee as Mr Fred Barnes, a garbage man
- Hugh Grant as Phoenix Buchanan, an actor and master of disguise, who steals the pop-up book
- Ben Whishaw as the voice of Paddington Brown, a young Peruvian bear
- Marie-France Alvarez as Mademoiselle Dubois, a woman who rides a bicycle
- Enzo Squillino Jr. as Mr Giuseppe, a barber
- Louis Partridge as G-Man, a friend of Jonathan's
- Meera Syal as a prosecutor
- Richard Ayoade as a forensic investigator
- Tom Davis as T-Bone, a prisoner
- Jamie Demetriou as the Professor, a prisoner
- Simon Farnaby as Barry, a security guard
- Maggie Steed as Gertrude Biggleswade, Gerald's wife
- Kya Garwood as Felicity Fanshawe’s Assistant

== Production ==
In April 2015, David Heyman, the producer of Paddington (2014), confirmed that a sequel was in development. It was also announced that Paul King would return to direct, and co-write the screenplay with Simon Farnaby. Heyman's Heyday Films, and StudioCanal, produced the film, making it a British-French co-production. By October 2016, most of the cast of Paddington—Hugh Bonneville, Sally Hawkins, Julie Walters, Jim Broadbent, Peter Capaldi, Madeleine Harris, Samuel Joslin, Ben Whishaw and Imelda Staunton—were confirmed to be returning for the sequel, joined by Hugh Grant and Brendan Gleeson. King conceived Phoenix Buchanan as a vain, narcissistic and unsuccessful actor and approached Hugh Grant specifically for the role. King later said that Grant contributed additional comedy to the character through suggestions and rewrites during production.

Principal photography began on 18 October. Many of the domestic interiors were filmed on stages at Pinewood Studios and Warner Bros. Studios, Leavesden, but producers also shot at key central London locations like Tower Bridge and St Paul's Cathedral. Jonah Coombes, supervising location on both Paddington and the sequel, stated, "We were looking for locations that celebrated London and delivered the kind of cinematic scale we were looking for." Framestore provided the visual effects for the film, including the elaborate pop-up book sequence. On 7 February 2017, filming featured in the CBBC documentary series All Over the Workplace. Filming took place in London's Little Venice for three days, and also at Shepton Mallet Prison and Knebworth Park. Craig Revel Horwood choreographed the prison dance scene. Principal photography wrapped on 27 June 2017. Michael Bond, the creator of Paddington Bear, died the same day, and the film was dedicated to him.

=== Writing and influences ===
King and co-writer Simon Farnaby initially found it difficult to devise a story for the sequel because Paddington does not possess a conventional character flaw that needs to be overcome. King said that the films of Frank Capra, particularly Mr. Smith Goes to Washington (1939), provided the eventual structure: placing an innocent, well-intentioned protagonist in a cynical environment and testing whether his values could survive. King described the prison storyline as the ultimate test of Paddington's belief in kindness and politeness.

For the film's visual style, King cited The Umbrellas of Cherbourg (1964), particularly its colour palette, as an influence on the transformation of the prison into a pastel-coloured environment. He also cited Amélie (2001) and the films of Jacques Tati as influences on the romanticised depiction of the city, while Charlie Chaplin influenced the film's visual comedy and prison sequences.

== Soundtrack ==
The music of the film was composed by Dario Marianelli.

Additional music in the film, not included on the soundtrack recording, includes "Rain on the Roof" (Stephen Sondheim) – Hugh Grant, which is performed during the end credits.

== Release ==
Paddington 2 had its world premiere in London on 5 November 2017, and was theatrically released in the United Kingdom on 10 November. It was released on 6 December in France, 7 December in Germany, 21 December in Australia and New Zealand, and 12 January 2018 in the United States.

=== Distribution ===
StudioCanal distributed Paddington 2 in the United Kingdom, France, Germany, Australia and New Zealand.

The Weinstein Company was originally slated to distribute Paddington 2 in the United States and Canada through TWC-Dimension, as the first film. However, following the sexual abuse allegations against the studio founder Harvey Weinstein in October 2017, Heyday Films and StudioCanal severed ties with them, believing that a children's film should not be associated with the Weinstein scandal. In November 2017, Warner Bros. Pictures, which distributed Heyday's Harry Potter films and was already distributing the Paddington films in Spain, acquired the film's North American distribution rights for $32 million (£24 million). Warner Bros. also gained the right of first refusal to distribute future Paddington films in North America, though it was later rescinded when it was announced that the third film would be distributed by Sony Pictures in that region.

=== Marketing ===
From 9 October 2017, five pop-up installations of Paddington's pop-up book, featured in the film, were placed around London, at Peter's Hill, Tower Bridge, Paddington Station, Peninsula Square and Bankside. The event was promoted by Visit London. The launch was attended by Hugh Bonneville and the mayor of London Sadiq Khan.

On 16 October 2017, Prince William, Duke of Cambridge and Catherine, Duchess of Cambridge attended a Paddington 2 charity event at Paddington Station, along with some of the cast and crew of the film. A video game based on the film, Paddington Run, was released on iOS, Android and Windows Phone devices on 25 October 2017.

On 26 October 2017, it was announced that Paddington would appear in the 2017 Marks & Spencer Christmas advertisement. A teaser was released on 4 November 2017. The advertisement itself was released on 7 November 2017 and had its television premiere on the Pride of Britain Awards 2017. Whishaw returned to voice Paddington, with the advertisement also featuring Mark Benton and Angela Rippon.

=== Home media ===
Paddington 2 was released in the United Kingdom on Blu-ray, DVD and 4K Ultra HD Blu-ray on 12 March 2018. In the United States, Warner Bros. Home Entertainment released the film for digital purchase on 27 March 2018 and on Blu-ray and DVD on 24 April.

In Japan, a limited-edition two-disc Blu-ray of Paddington 2 was released on 4 July 2018 by Pony Canyon. The release included interviews with the cast and crew, and highlights from the world premiere and Japanese premiere events. Additional extras included a planned 32-page booklet, a pop-up card inspired by the film's storybook, stickers and collector's packaging.

== Reception ==
=== Box office ===
Paddington 2 grossed $40.9 million in the United States and Canada, and $242.8 million in other countries (including $110.9 million in the United Kingdom), for a worldwide total of $290.1 million.

In its first weekend in the United Kingdom, the film grossed $10.9 million (£8.3 million), more than the first film ($8/£6 million), becoming StudioCanal's highest-grossing film opening weekend in the United Kingdom to date. In its second weekend, the film dropped 20% and grossed another $8.8 million (£6.6 million).

In the United States and Canada, Paddington 2 was released alongside the openings of The Commuter and Proud Mary, as well as the wide expansion of The Post, and was projected to gross $15–17 million from 3,702 theatres in opening weekend. It made $2.4 million on its first day and $11 million over the weekend (including $15 million over the four-day Martin Luther King Jr. weekend), finishing 7th at the box office, and marking a near-50% decline from the opening of the first film. It made $8 million in its second weekend, dropping 27% and finishing 6th.

According to the British Film Institute's 2019 Statistical Yearbook, after adjusting for inflation, Paddington 2 was the fourth-highest-grossing independent UK film released at the British box office between 1975 and 2018, with an inflation-adjusted gross of £43.4 million. It ranked immediately ahead of the first Paddington, which placed fifth.

=== Critical response ===
On review aggregator Rotten Tomatoes, Paddington 2 has an approval rating of 99% based on 253 reviews, with an average rating of 8.7/10. The website's critical consensus reads, "Paddington 2 honours its star's rich legacy with a sweet-natured sequel whose adorable visuals are matched by a story perfectly balanced between heartwarming family fare and purely enjoyable all-ages adventure." On 18 January 2018, it became the most-reviewed film ever to remain at 100% on the site, with 164 positive reviews, beating Toy Story 2, which had 163 positive reviews at the time. Lady Bird had previously beaten the record the past November, but registered a negative review at 196. In 2021, the 100% score for Citizen Kane (1941), often regarded as the greatest film ever made, was changed to 99% following the inclusion of a contemporary negative review; some publications satirically labelled Paddington 2 as a better film than Citizen Kane due to their respective scores. In May 2021, Paddington 2's score dropped to 99% after a negative review was registered on the site.

On Metacritic, another review aggregator, the film has a weighted average score of 88 out of 100 based on 38 critics, indicating "universal acclaim". On French entertainment information publisher AlloCiné, the film has an average grade of 4.0/5 based on 22 critics. Audiences polled by CinemaScore gave the film an average grade of "A" on an A+ to F scale, the same score earned by its predecessor.

Leslie Felperin of The Hollywood Reporter wrote, "Paddington 2 won't save the world, sadly, but its existence makes everything just that tiny bit better and more, well, bearable." Guy Lodge of Variety wrote, "Another near pawfect family entertainment, honouring the cosy, can-do spirit of Michael Bond's stories while bringing them smoothly into a bustling, diverse 21st century London—with space for some light anti-Brexit subtext to boot." Peter Bradshaw of The Guardian wrote, "The film is pitched with insouciant ease and a lightness of touch at both children and adults without any self-conscious shifts in irony or tone: it's humour with the citrus tang of top quality thick-cut marmalade." In 2019, The Guardian ranked Paddington 2 the 69th best film of the 21st century.

The Wire creator, author, and show runner David Simon commented in 2026 that Paddington 2 is "as if Shakespeare and Moliere both rose from their graves and banged out one last triumph together... And no, I'm not being hyperbolic."

=== Accolades ===
Award	Date of ceremony	Category	Nominee(s)	Result	Ref.
Heartland Film Festival	31 December 2017	Truly Moving Picture Award	Paul King	Won	
London Film Critics' Circle Awards	28 January 2018	Best British or Irish Film	Paddington 2	Nominated	
London Film Critics' Circle Awards	28 January 2018	Best Supporting Actor	Hugh Grant	Won	
London Film Critics' Circle Awards	28 January 2018	Best British or Irish Actress	Sally Hawkins (also for The Shape of Water and Maudie)	Won	
London Film Critics' Circle Awards	28 January 2018	Best Breakthrough British or Irish Filmmaker	Simon Farnaby	Nominated	
London Film Critics' Circle Awards	28 January 2018	Technical Achievement	Pablo Grillo	Nominated	
Evening Standard British Film Awards	8 February 2018	Everyman Award for Best Film	Paddington 2	Nominated	
Evening Standard British Film Awards	8 February 2018	Peter Sellers Award for Comedy	Paddington 2	Won	
Evening Standard British Film Awards	8 February 2018	Technical Achievement	Gary Williamson	Won	
British Academy Film Awards	18 February 2018	Best British Film	Paul King, David Heyman and Simon Farnaby	Nominated	
British Academy Film Awards	18 February 2018	Best Actor in a Supporting Role	Hugh Grant	Nominated	
British Academy Film Awards	18 February 2018	Best Adapted Screenplay	Simon Farnaby and Paul King	Nominated	
International Film Music Critics Association	22 February 2018	Best Original Score for a Comedy Film	Dario Marianelli	Nominated	
Empire Awards	18 March 2018	Best British Film	Paddington 2	Nominated	
Saturn Awards	27 June 2018	Best Fantasy Film	Paddington 2	Nominated	
Los Angeles Online Film Critics Society Mid-Season Awards	3 July 2018	Best Picture	David Heyman	Runner-Up	
Los Angeles Online Film Critics Society Mid-Season Awards	3 July 2018	Best Supporting Actor	Hugh Grant	Nominated	
Los Angeles Online Film Critics Society Mid-Season Awards	3 July 2018	Best Adapted Screenplay	Paul King and Simon Farnaby	Won	
People's Choice Awards	11 November 2018	The Family Movie of 2018	Paddington 2	Shortlisted	
British Academy Children's Awards	25 November 2018	Feature Film	Paul King, Simon Farnaby and David Heyman	Won	
Washington D.C. Area Film Critics Association Awards	3 December 2018	Best Voice Performance	Ben Whishaw	Nominated	
Chicago Film Critics Association Awards	7 December 2018	Best Art Direction/Production Design	Paddington 2	Nominated	
Chicago Film Critics Association Awards	7 December 2018	Best Use of Visual Effects	Paddington 2	Nominated	
Los Angeles Film Critics Association	9 December 2018	Best Supporting Actor	Hugh Grant	Runner-up	
San Diego Film Critics Society	10 December 2018	Best Visual Effects	Paddington 2	Nominated	
San Diego Film Critics Society	10 December 2018	Best Costume Design	Paddington 2	Runner-up	
San Diego Film Critics Society	10 December 2018	Best Comedic Performance	Hugh Grant	Won	
St. Louis Film Critics Association	16 December 2018	Best Comedy	Paddington 2	Nominated	
Seattle Film Critics Society	17 December 2018	Best Picture	Paddington 2	Nominated	
Seattle Film Critics Society	17 December 2018	Villain of the year	Hugh Grant	Nominated	
Indiana Film Journalists Association Awards	17 December 2018	Best Picture	Paddington 2	Runner-Up	
Indiana Film Journalists Association Awards	17 December 2018	Best Vocal/Motion Capture Performance	Ben Whishaw	Runner-Up	
Florida Film Critics Circle Awards	21 December 2018	Best Supporting Actor	Hugh Grant	Nominated	
Florida Film Critics Circle Awards	21 December 2018	Best Art Direction/Production Design	Paddington 2	Runner-Up	
Austin Film Critics Association	7 January 2019	Best Supporting Actor	Hugh Grant	Nominated	
Austin Film Critics Association	7 January 2019	Best Vocal/Motion Capture Performance	Ben Whishaw	Nominated	
Los Angeles Online Film Critics Society	9 January 2019	Best Visual Effects or Animated Performance	Ben Whishaw	Nominated	
Alliance of Women Film Journalists	10 January 2019	Best Supporting Actor	Hugh Grant	Nominated	
Golden Tomato Awards	11 January 2019	Best-Reviewed Wide Release	Paddington 2	7th Place	
Golden Tomato Awards	11 January 2019	Best Movie 2018: UK	Paddington 2	Won	
Golden Tomato Awards	11 January 2019	Best Kids and Family Movie	Paddington 2	Won	
Annie Awards	2 February 2019	Outstanding Achievement for Character Animation in a Live Action Production	Pablo Grillo, Laurent Laban, Kyle Dunlevy, Stuart Ellis and Liam Russell	Nominated	
Movieguide Awards	8 February 2019	Best Movie for Families	Paddington 2	Nominated	
Movieguide Awards	8 February 2019	Faith & Freedom Award for Movies	Paddington 2	Nominated	

== Related media ==
=== Television series ===
In February 2019, StudioCanal and Nickelodeon announced The Adventures of Paddington, a computer-animated television series with Ben Whishaw reprising his role as the voice of Paddington. The series premiered in the United States on Nickelodeon on 20 January 2020, followed by an international rollout beginning in March.

=== Sequel ===
A third film, titled Paddington in Peru, was announced in June 2022, with Dougal Wilson replacing Paul King as director. King remained involved as an executive producer and contributed to the story. The film was released in the United Kingdom on 8 November 2024 and in the United States on 14 February 2025.

== Legacy ==
In the years following its release, Paddington 2 developed a reputation as one of the most acclaimed family films and sequels of its era. In January 2018, it became the most-reviewed film on Rotten Tomatoes to retain a 100% approval rating, surpassing the previous record held by Toy Story 2. In May 2021, Guinness World Records verified the film as the most positively reviewed film on Rotten Tomatoes, with 245 positive reviews and a 100% score.

The film has continued to appear in retrospective rankings. In 2019, The Guardian placed it 69th on its list of the 100 best films of the 21st century. In 2025, Rotten Tomatoes ranked it 22nd on its list of the 100 greatest films of the 21st century, and in 2026 placed it fourth on its ranking of the greatest film sequels.

The film's reputation was referenced prominently in the 2022 comedy The Unbearable Weight of Massive Talent, in which Javi, played by Pedro Pascal, recommends Paddington 2 to a fictionalised Nicolas Cage, and the two bond after watching it together. Director Tom Gormican said the filmmakers included it because they considered it "a perfect movie", while Cage described it as "quite wonderful".

== See also ==
- London in film
- List of films with a 100% rating on Rotten Tomatoes, a film review aggregator website
- List of films considered the best
