= Paul King (director) =

English writer and director (born 1978)

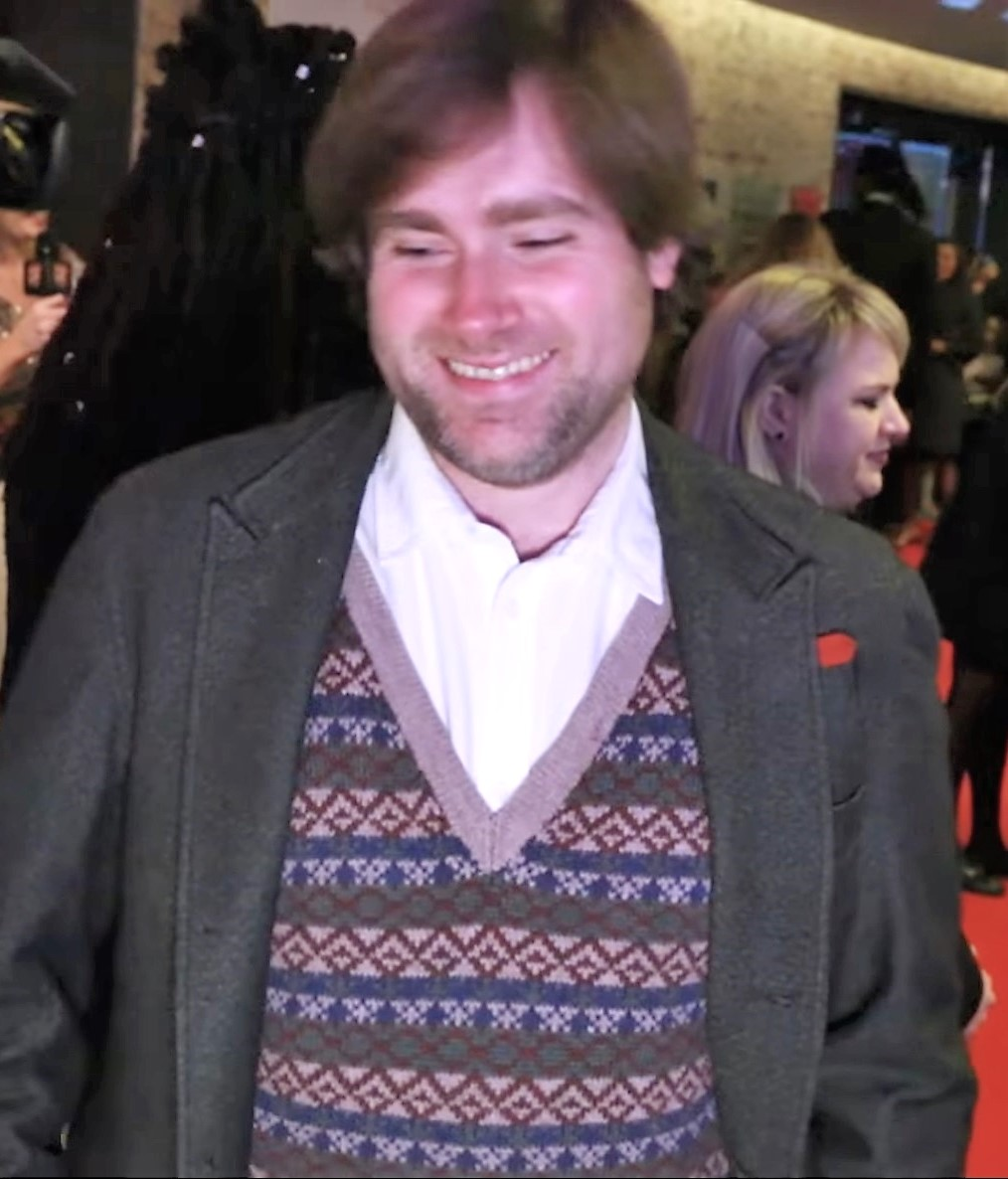
- King in 2015
- Born: Paul Thomas King; 29 July 1978 (age 48); Hampshire, England
- Education: St Catharine's College, Cambridge (BA)
- Occupations: Writer; director
- Years active: 1999–present
- Notable work: The Mighty Boosh, Paddington, Wonka

Paul Thomas King (born 29 July 1978) is an English writer, director and producer. He works in television, film and theatre. He directed all 20 episodes of the surreal BBC Three comedy series The Mighty Boosh (2004–2007), and in 2005 he earned a British Academy Television Award nomination for Best New Director.

His work on the family comedy films Paddington (2014) and Paddington 2 (2017) both earned him British Academy Film Award nominations for Best British Film and Best Adapted Screenplay. He later directed and co-wrote Wonka (2023), a film which serves as a backstory to the literary character Willy Wonka and explores his early days as a chocolatier.

== Career ==
King graduated from St Catharine's College, Cambridge with first-class honours in English in 1999. While at Cambridge he met Richard Ayoade, Matthew Holness and Alice Lowe, and went on to direct them at the Edinburgh Festival in "Garth Marenghi's FrightKnight" (nominated for the Perrier Award in 2000), and "Netherhead" (Perrier Award winner 2001). King worked as associate director on the subsequent TV transfer, Garth Marenghi's Darkplace, a six-part series for Channel 4. In 2002, King garnered another Perrier Award nomination for directing Noel Fielding's Edinburgh Festival show, "Voodoo Hedgehog".

King is also the director of BBC's The Mighty Boosh. He has directed all three series (earning a BAFTA nomination as Best New Director in 2005), as well as their live tour shows in 2006 and 2008. King was originally brought in after the director of the pilot, Steve Bendelack, was unavailable to direct the first series. He also directed Matt Lucas and David Walliams' 2011 airport mockumentary Come Fly With Me.

Bunny and the Bull, which King wrote and directed, was released in 2009. The film stars Simon Farnaby and Edward Hogg, with cameos from Noel Fielding, Richard Ayoade and Julian Barratt.

King's follow-up feature was the book-to-screen adaptation Paddington (2014), which he directed and co-wrote with Hamish McColl. The film was a critical and commercial success, earning King nominations for both the BAFTA Award for Best Adapted Screenplay and the BAFTA Award for Best British Film (shared with the film's producer David Heyman).

The positive reception for Paddington resulted in the green-lighting of a sequel. King returned to direct and write Paddington 2 (2017). The film was released on 10 November 2017 in the UK, and 12 January 2018 in the U.S. It received three nominations at the 2018 BAFTA Awards, including Outstanding British Film and Best Adapted Screenplay, and it appeared on numerous lists of best films of the year and of the 2010s.

In 2023, King directed and co-wrote Wonka, a film which serves as a prequel to the Roald Dahl novel Charlie and the Chocolate Factory, exploring Willy Wonka's origins. In a five star review of the film, Robbie Collin of The Telegraph writes, "King’s Wonka plonks itself squarely in that very British tradition of surreal escapades with a satirical kick. Long before the Boosh came Not the Nine O'Clock News (whose famous gorilla joke makes a cameo of sorts), then the Pythons — and before them all The Goon Show, of which Wonka often feels like a feature-length episode."

On October 17, 2024 it was announced that King was going to direct a Cinderella spin-off film focusing on the character Prince Charming. The film was going to be produced by Walt Disney Pictures. It was rumored later that year that Chris Hemsworth had been officially hired to play Prince Charming.

In December 2025, it was announced that King would be directing a movie based on the Labubu toy line.

== Filmography ==
Film

Year	Title	Director	Writer
2009	Bunny and the Bull	Yes	Yes
2014	Paddington	Yes	Yes
2017	Paddington 2	Yes	Yes
2023	Wonka	Yes	Yes
2024	Paddington in Peru	No	Story

Television

Year	Title	Notes
2004	Garth Marenghi's Darkplace	6 episodes (Associate director)
2004–2007	The Mighty Boosh	20 episodes
2007	Dogface	5 episodes (Also writer)
2009	The Mighty Boosh Live: Future Sailors Tour	Live show
2010–2011	Come Fly with Me	6 episodes
2011	Little Crackers	2 episodes
2020	Space Force	2 episodes (Also executive producer)
