= Samuel Joslin =

British actor

- Born: Samuel Louis Joslin; Kensington, London, England
- Education: Tower House School
- Occupation: Actor
- Years active: 2012–present

Samuel Louis Joslin is a British film and television actor. He is best known for playing the role of Thomas Bennett in The Impossible and Jonathan Brown in Paddington (2014) and its 2017 and 2024 sequels.

== Career ==
In 2012, Joslin got his first major role as Thomas Bennett in The Impossible, a true story about a family that survived the Indian Ocean tsunami on 26 December 2004. In 2014, Joslin starred along Lambert Wilson in the short film The Nostalgist. The film focuses on the father (Wilson) and his unusual son (Joslin) in a future world. In the same year he got the part of Jonathan Brown in the British movie Paddington. In 2015, Joslin played Marcus Maudsley in The Go-Between. In 2017, Joslin reprised his role as Jonathan Brown in Paddington 2, and reprised his role a third time in Paddington in Peru in 2024.

== Filmography ==
=== Film ===
Year	Title	Role	Notes
2012	The Impossible	Thomas Bennett	
2014	The Nostalgist	The Boy	Short film
2014	Paddington	Jonathan Brown	
2017	Paddington 2	Jonathan Brown	
2024	Paddington in Peru	Jonathan Brown	

=== Television ===
Year	Title	Role	Notes
2015	The Go-Between	Marcus Maudsley	Television film
2016	Houdini & Doyle	Peter Bennett	Episode: "A Dish of Adharma"

== Awards and nominations ==
Year	Award	Category	Work	Result
2012	34th Young Artist Awards	Best Performance in a Feature Film – Supporting Young Actor	The Impossible	Nominated
