= Madeleine Harris =

British actress (born 2001)

- Born: 28 April 2001 (age 24); London, England
- Occupation: Actress
- Years active: 2012–present
- Known for: Man Down (2013–2016); Paddington (2014); Paddington 2 (2017); Paddington in Peru (2024)

Madeleine Harris (born 28 April 2001) is an English actress. She is best known for her role as Judy Brown in the fantasy family film Paddington (2014) and its sequels - Paddington 2 (2017) and Paddington in Peru (2024). On television, she appeared in the Channel 4 sitcom Man Down (2017).

== Early life and education ==
Harris grew up in Shepton Mallet, Somerset. She attended Whitstone School. As of 2014, she managed to balance her school work with her acting jobs. Harris has liked other artistic disciplines and has enjoyed writing her own stories since she was young.

== Career ==
In 2012, Harris got her first professional acting job in the British medical drama and soap opera television series Casualty playing Izzy Forrester who caused a road collision. She appeared in the BBC One television miniseries Me and Mrs Jones and The White Queen. In 2013, she played Hetty the Vampire in an episode of the British supernatural horror and comedy-drama television series Being Human. In 2014 and 2017, Harris appeared in the two Paddington Bear movies as Judy Brown. From 2013 to 2016, she played Karen in the British sitcom Man Down.

=== Other ventures ===
In addition to acting, Harris is a professional tattoo artist; she started training in 2018 at the Last Dragon parlour in Wells. As of 2024, her practice is based in Radstock.

== Filmography ==
=== Film ===
| Year | Title | Role | Notes |
|---|---|---|---|
| 2014 | Paddington | Judy Brown | |
| 2017 | Paddington 2 | Judy Brown | |
| 2024 | Paddington in Peru | Judy Brown | |

=== Television ===
| Year | Title | Role | Notes |
|---|---|---|---|
| 2012 | Casualty | Izzy Forrester | Episodes: "Duty of Care" and "Death and Doughnuts" |
| 2012 | The Charles Dickens Show | Betsy | Episode: "Child Labour" |
| 2012 | Me and Mrs Jones | Poppy | Miniseries |
| 2013 | Being Human | Hetty | Episode: "The Trinity" |
| 2013 | The Psychopath Next Door | Katie Moran | Television film |
| 2013 | The White Queen | Princess Margaret of York | Episodes: "The Princes in the Tower" and "The Final Battle" |
| 2013–2016 | Man Down | Karen | 14 episodes |
| 2016 | Father Brown | Milly Le Broc | Episode: "The Missing Man" |
