= Joel Fry =

Joel Fry may refer to:

- Joel Fry (actor) (born 1984), English actor
- Joel Fry (politician) (born 1974), American politician, Iowa State Representative from the 27th District
