= Framestore =

British visual effects and computer animation company

Coordinates: 51°30′54.2″N 0°8′11.7″W

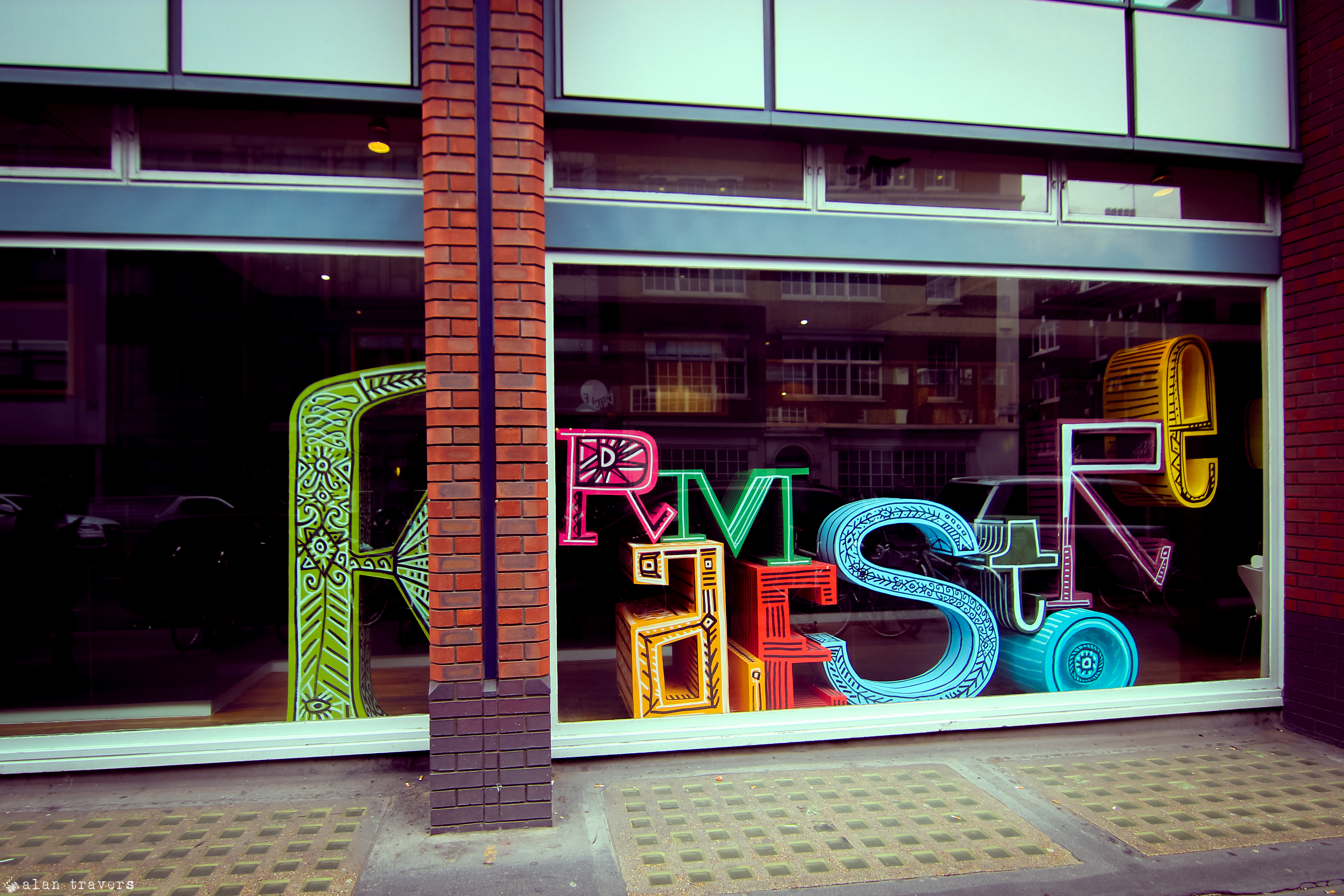
- Framestore office near Oxford Street, London, circa 2013
- Industry: Motion picture; Visual and special effects
- Founded: 1986
- Founders: William Sargent; Sharon Reed; Mike McGee; Alison Turner; Jonathan Hills
- Headquarters: Chancery Lane, London, England
- Number of locations: 7
- Key people: William Sargent (Chairman); Mel Sullivan (CEO); Fiona Walkinshaw (CEO, Film & Episodic); Charles Howell (President, Global Advertising & Content)
- Products: Visual effects Post-production
- Subsidiaries: Company 3 Method Studios
- Website: framestore.com

Framestore is a British visual effects and computer animation studio based on Chancery Lane in London. The company was founded in 1986. Framestore specialises in visual effects for film and TV, advertising, rides and immersive experiences. It is the largest production house in Europe, employing roughly 3,000 staff, including 1,000 in London, and 1,500 across studios in Chicago, New York, Los Angeles, Montreal, Melbourne and Mumbai.

== History ==
=== Foundation ===
Framestore was founded in 1986 by William Sargent and Sharon Reed, together with three friends. Tim Webber joined Framestore in 1988 and led the company's push into digital film and television, developing Framestore's virtual camera and motion rig systems. In 1992, Mike Milne started the CGI department, adding computer-generated imagery animation to the company's range of facilities.

=== Merger with CFC ===
In 1997, Framestore acquired the Computer Film Company, which was one of the UK's first digital film visual effects companies, developing technology for digital film scanning, compositing and output. CFC was founded in London in 1984 by Mike Boudry, Wolfgang Lempp (now CTO of Filmlight) and Neil Harris (of Lightworks fame). CFC's first film was The Fruit Machine, in 1988, which utilised early morphing techniques.

In 2004, Framestore opened its first satellite office in New York City, to focus on advertising. This was followed by another office in Iceland in 2008, which has since been closed and has reopened as a local VFX company, RVX. In 2013 Framestore opened an office in Montreal, followed by another in Los Angeles the same year. In 2014, it launched a production arm.

Early projects for the company include the delivery of its first feature animation project The Tale of Despereaux with Universal, the completion of Europe's first digital intermediate for the film Chicken Run in 2000, contribution of scenes for the 2009 film Avatar and the completion as a production project of four British feature films which opened in theatres between during 2009 and 2010.

=== Acquisition by CIH ===
In November 2016, the Shanghai-based Cultural Investment Holdings Co acquired 75% of Framestore for £112.50 million. The company worked on projects such as Fantastic Beasts and Where to Find Them, Beauty and the Beast and Paddington 2. In April 2017, Framestore announced that it had opened a third US location, in Chicago, Illinois.

The company also worked on the 2017 film Darkest Hour directed by Joe Wright, working out of the Montreal facility of Framestore to create historically accurate backdrops for 85 shots in the film, including battle scenes.

The team created around 300 shots for the 2017 film Blade Runner 2049, with Framestore winning a special visual effects award at the 2018 British Academy Film Awards. Framestore has also worked on Black Mirror, creating props such as the 60s-style spaceship in the premiere of the fourth season.

In November 2020, Framestore announced that it had acquired Deluxe's former creative assets including Method Studios and Company 3 to expand its VFX and post-production landscapes.

== Reception ==
Framestore has been awarded two Scientific and Technical Academy Awards and 14 Primetime Emmys. In 2008, Framestore won its first Academy Award for Best Visual Effects for the film The Golden Compass; it also won the BAFTA Award for that film the same year. Framestore was also nominated for Academy Awards in 2009 (The Dark Knight) and again in 2010 (Harry Potter and the Deathly Hallows – Part 1).

Tim Webber was the VFX supervisor on Gravity (2013); the techniques involved in the film realised by Webber and the Framestore team took three years to complete. The team won the Best Visual Effects awards BAFTA Award for Best Special Visual Effects at the 67th British Academy Film Awards and the Academy Award for Best Visual Effects award at the 86th Academy Awards.

The company then won both the Academy Award and BAFTA for Best Visual Effects in 2018 for its work on Blade Runner 2049.

In advertising the team has also won major awards including Cannes Lions, British Television Advertising Awards, Clios, D&AD and others.

The company's R&D team spun off to create the technology company Filmlight, which in 2010 received four Scientific Academy Awards.

Framestore won the 2020 BAFTA TV Craft Awards for Special, Visual & Graphic Effects for its extensive work on the HBO/BBC series His Dark Materials.

== Advertising and trade characters ==
Framestore has collaborated with companies and advertising agencies to create trade characters. It also created an attempted photorealistic computer-generated Audrey Hepburn for a Galaxy chocolate advert. A combination of elements including body doubles, motion-capture, FACS and the rendering software Arnold were used to mimic the appearance of the actress 20 years after her death. The advert drew press attention both for the cutting-edge technology utilised and the ethical implications of using a person's likeness posthumously for commercial purposes.

== Selected film and TV credits ==
- The Fruit Machine (1988)
- Walking with… (1999–2005)
- Chicken Run (2000)
- Harry Potter and the Chamber of Secrets (2002)
- Harry Potter and the Prisoner of Azkaban (2004)
- Thunderbirds (2004)
- Charlie and the Chocolate Factory (2005)
- Harry Potter and the Goblet of Fire (2005)
- Superman Returns (2006)
- Casino Royale (2006)
- Children of Men (2006)
- Harry Potter and the Order of the Phoenix (2007)
- The Golden Compass (2007)
- The Dark Knight (2008)
- Quantum of Solace (2008)
- The Tale of Despereaux (2008)
- Harry Potter and the Half-Blood Prince (2009)
- Avatar (2009)
- Harry Potter and the Deathly Hallows – Part 1 (2010)
- Harry Potter and the Deathly Hallows – Part 2 (2011)
- Black Mirror (2011–)
- War Horse (2011)
- Iron Man 3 (2013)
- Gravity (2013)
- RoboCop (2014)
- Guardians of the Galaxy (2014)
- Dracula Untold (2014)
- Paddington (2014)
- Avengers: Age of Ultron (2015)
- Poltergeist (2015)
- Everest (2015)
- The Martian (2015)
- Spectre (2015)
- Doctor Strange (2016)
- Fantastic Beasts and Where to Find Them (2016)
- Beauty and the Beast (2017)
- Guardians of the Galaxy Vol. 2 (2017)
- King Arthur: Legend of the Sword (2017)
- Kingsman: The Golden Circle (2017)
- Blade Runner 2049 (2017)
- Geostorm (2017)
- Paddington 2 (2017)
- Darkest Hour (2017)
- Avengers: Infinity War (2018)
- Christopher Robin (2018)
- Fantastic Beasts: The Crimes of Grindelwald (2018)
- Mowgli: Legend of the Jungle (2018)
- Avengers: Endgame (2019)
- Pokémon Detective Pikachu (2019)
- The Boys (2019–26)
- The Witcher (2019–)
- His Dark Materials (2019–22)
- Lovecraft Country (2020)
- Mulan (2020)
- The Midnight Sky (2020)
- Tom & Jerry (2021)
- No Time to Die (2021)
- Invasion (2021–)
- Spider-Man: No Way Home (2021)
- The Matrix Resurrections (2021)
- 1899 (2022)
- Guardians of the Galaxy Vol. 3 (2023)
- Barbie (2023)
- IF (2024)
- Deadpool & Wolverine (2024)
- Paddington in Peru (2024)
- Wicked (2024)
- Snow White (2025)
- Thunderbolts* (2025)
- How to Train Your Dragon (2025)
- The Fantastic Four: First Steps (2025)
- Predator: Badlands (2025)
- Wicked: For Good (2025)
- Prehistoric Planet: Ice Age (2025)
- Project Hail Mary (2026)
- The Sheep Detectives (2026)
- Supergirl (2026)
- Spider-Man: Brand New Day (2026)
