= Paddington (soundtrack) =

Paddington (Original Motion Picture Soundtrack)

Soundtrack album by Nick Urata and various artists
- Released: 15 December 2014
- Recorded: 2014
- Genre: Soundtrack
- Length: 53:40
- Label: Decca

Nick Urata chronology
Alfred and Jakobine (2014)	Paddington (Original Motion Picture Soundtrack) (2014)	Focus (2015)

Paddington (Original Motion Picture Soundtrack) is the soundtrack to the 2014 film Paddington directed by Paul King. Released in the United Kingdom on 15 December 2014, and in the United States on 13 January 2015, the album accompanied musical score composed by Nick Urata, with a compilation of original and pre-existing songs heard in the film.

== Development ==
"Although [writing the Paddington score] was physically and mentally trying, it was a big positive. That adrenaline gets you out of bed every morning, very early, and it keeps you in the studio all day. It was a very driving creative force. I credit it [for] a lot of great music that’s done this way."

— Nick Urata

Nick Urata of the DeVotchKa band composed the musical score for Paddington. Urata wanted to explore the diverse range of emotions through the music and the pieces he composed eventually attributed the same. He felt moved by the emotional parts despite its simplistic and silly storyline, as it dwells deep into the themes of love, loss and family. Due to King's musical sensibilities, Urata found it easier to work with him as he could assist on specific compositions and re-arrange and re-record the pieces that did not suit. Much of the score featuring string orchestra and choir were recorded live in London, where the film was set in. Urata, though hailing from New York City, did not find it much difficult as he was focused on curating the themes for the characters and the emotions, over the geographical nature, albeit Urata being a fan of British films. He wrote the score in London during the film's production, which helped him subconsciously immersed in the music of the city.

According to Urata, the calypso band was a deliberate choice for the music due to its style, and "there's just that common theme or underlying theme in the story that London is this big welcoming international city made up of immigrants that are all looking for a home" which led him to zero on the calypso band. The film's music was almost allowed to speak louder and to be cartoonish, funny and exaggerated but also highlight the underlying emotion with the film's music; he called the film score to be his funniest he had ever done.

In an action sequence, Urata re-arranged the sample of the Mission: Impossible theme used in the final act. Urata recalled that the producers hosted test screenings and screenings for the families and friends before the film's release, and the audience liked the specific theme and its placement. Since the producers did not get the license to use the original recording, Urata re-recorded the theme.

Urata expressed his interest on returning for the sequel. However, in September 2017, Dario Marianelli was announced as the composer for Paddington 2 instead.

== Release ==
Paddington (Original Motion Picture Soundtrack) was marketed by Decca Records and released first in the United Kingdom on 15 December 2014 and in the United States on 13 January 2015. The album featured musical score composed by Nick Urata and songs performed and re-recorded by D Lime and Tobago Cruise as the featured artist, while James Brown's "I Got You (I Feel Good)", Steppenwolf's "Born to Be Wild" and Lionel Richie's "Hello" were also included in the film and its soundtrack.

The image song for the Japanese release is "Happiness" by Ai.

Gwen Stefani wrote and performed the promotional song titled "Shine" featuring Pharrell Williams as the performer, songwriter and producer. The song was commissioned as a CD single by the distributor TWC-Dimension and sent to the Academy of Motion Picture Arts and Sciences as part of the submission process to be considered for the Academy Award for Best Original Song, despite failing to receive a nomination.

== Critical reception ==
Timothy Monger of AllMusic wrote "Mixing a cinematic English wistfulness with upbeat Latin themes, Urata has managed to create something that is both playful and, at times, disarmingly tender." Oliver Lyletton of IndieWire wrote "Nick Urata's lovely score incorporating some Mark Mothersbaugh-ish harpischord—in the way that Edgar Wright might use them." A review from Namibia Economist summarised that "The soundtrack provided a melodic backdrop to the feel of the film, with songs that were reflective of what the bear may have been feeling as a lonely immigrant in a fast-paced city, just trying to find a place to belong."

== Track listing ==
All music is composed by Nick Urata, except where noted.

Paddington (Original Motion Picture Soundtrack) track listing
No.	Title	Performer	Length
1.	"Marmalade Harvest"	Nick Urata	1:43
2.	"Journey from Peru"	Nick Urata	2:22
3.	"London Is the Place for Me"	D Lime featuring Tobago Crusoe	2:39
4.	"I Got You (I Feel Good)"	James Brown	2:47
5.	"Arrival in London"	Nick Urata	1:51
6.	"This Will Do Nicely"	Nick Urata	1:22
7.	"Duel with Facilities"	Nick Urata	2:13
8.	"The Letter Home"	Nick Urata	2:57
9.	"Millicent's Lab"	Nick Urata	1:49
10.	"Gruber's Story"	Nick Urata	0:38
11.	"Thief Chase"	Nick Urata	1:49
12.	"Born to Be Wild"	Steppenwolf	3:29
13.	"Bear Bath"	Nick Urata	1:41
14.	"Hello"	Lionel Richie	4:08
15.	"The Explorer's Film"	Nick Urata	2:45
16.	"Millicent Invasion"	Nick Urata	1:53
17.	"Gerrard Street"	D Lime featuring Tobago Crusoe	2:33
18.	"Ringing Doorbells"	Nick Urata	1:57
19.	"Museum Chase"	Nick Urata	4:15
20.	"Blow Wind Blow"	D Lime featuring Tobago Crusoe	1:59
21.	"Escape from Millicent"	Nick Urata	2:29
22.	"Savito"	D Lime featuring Tobago Crusoe	2:01
23.	"He Is Family"	Nick Urata	1:20
24.	"Epilogue"	Nick Urata	1:10
Total length:			53:40

== Charts ==
Chart performance for Paddington (Original Motion Picture Soundtrack)
Chart (2014)	Peak position
UK Soundtrack Albums (OCC)	42
