= Erik Wilson =

Norwegian cinematographer (born 1975)

- Born: Erik Alexander Wilson; 15 December 1975 (age 50)
- Education: London Film School
- Years active: 1998–present
- Organization: British Society of Cinematographers
- Website: erikwilsondp.com

Erik Alexander Wilson (born 15 December 1975) is a Norwegian cinematographer.

== Early life ==
Wilson grew up in Bergen. His mother was a tutor and his father worked in shipping. He has some Scottish heritage, hence his surname.

He studied at the London Film School in Covent Garden, beginning his studies in editing before going into cinematography.

== Filmography ==
=== Film ===
Year	Title	Director	Notes
2010	Submarine	Richard Ayoade	
2011	Tyrannosaur	Paddy Considine	
2012	Now Is Good	Ol Parker	
2013	The Double	Richard Ayoade	
2014	Paddington	Paul King	
2016	Masterminds	Jared Hess	
2016	Rosemari	Sara Johnsen	With Hélène Louvart
2016	Hermetica Komhata HK320	Ric Salvador	
2017	Paddington 2	Paul King	
2020	Dream Horse	Euros Lyn	
2021	The Electrical Life of Louis Wain	Will Sharpe	
2024	Better Man	Michael Gracey	
2024	Paddington in Peru	Dougal Wilson	
2026	Crime 101	Bart Layton	
2028	Tangled †	Michael Gracey	Filming
TBA	Close Personal Friends †	Jason Orley	Post-production

Documentary film

Year	Title	Director	Notes
2012	The Imposter	Bart Layton	With Lynda Hall
2014	20,000 Days on Earth	Iain Forsyth; Jane Pollard	
2019	Tell Me Who I Am	Ed Perkins	With Patrick Smith

=== Television ===
TV movies

Year	Title	Director	Notes
2006	Pumpkinhead: Ashes to Ashes	Jake West	
2006	The Journalist and the Jihadi: The Murder of Daniel Pearl	Ahmed Alauddin Jamal; Ramesh Sharma	Documentary film
2007	Pumpkinhead: Blood Feud	Michael Hurst	

TV series

Year	Title	Director	Notes
2006	Holby City	Colin Teague	Episodes "Snake in the Grass", "Passing On" and "Extreme Measures"
2009	Trinity	Colin Teague; Declan O'Dwyer; Stephen Woolfenden	All 8 episodes
2010	Doctor Who	Catherine Morshead	Episode "Amy's Choice"
2011	Friday Night Dinner	Steve Bendelack	Season 1
2011	Comedy Showcase	Steve Bendelack	Episode "Chickens"
2017	Will	Shekhar Kapur	Episode "The Play's the Thing"
2018	Urban Myths	Iain Forsyth; Jane Pollard	Episode "The Dalí and The Cooper"
2019	The Dark Crystal: Age of Resistance	Louis Leterrier	All 10 episodes

Miniseries

Year	Title	Director
2009	Murderland	Catherine Morshead
2016	Neil Gaiman's Likely Stories	Iain Forsyth; Jane Pollard
2021	Landscapers	Will Sharpe

=== Music video ===
Year	Title	Artist(s)
2002	"Push"	Martin Grech
2005	"Decadent & Desperate"	Mortiis
2007	"Burn Your Youth"	Johnny Panic
2009	"Heads Will Roll"	Yeah Yeah Yeahs
2009	"Cornerstone"	Arctic Monkeys
2009	"Vlad the Impaler"	Kasabian
2012	"Drunk"	Ed Sheeran
2012	"All Of Me"	Tanlines
2013	"Jubilee Street"	Nick Cave and the Bad Seeds

== Awards and nominations ==
Year	Award	Category	Title	Result	Ref
2012	Camerimage	Feature Documentary Film	The Imposter (Shared with Lynda Hall)	Nominated	
2013	Camerimage	Best Cinematography in a Music Video	"Jubilee Street"	Nominated	
2013	Cinema Eye Honors	Outstanding Achievement in Cinematography	The Imposter (Shared with Lynda Hall)	Nominated	
2015	Cinema Eye Honors	Outstanding Achievement in Cinematography	20,000 Days on Earth	Tied	
2018	International Online Cinema Awards	Best Cinematography	Paddington 2	Won	
2022	British Academy Television Craft Awards	Best Photography & Lighting: Fiction	Landscapers	Won	
