= The Stargate =

Studio album by Mortiis
- Released: August 23, 1999
- Recorded: 1998–1999 in Norway
- Genre: Dungeon synth; neoclassical dark wave
- Length: 59:50
- Label: Earache Records
- Producer: Håvard Ellefsen, Niklas Trane, Conny Larsson

Mortiis chronology
| Crypt of the Wizard (1996) | The Stargate (1999) | The Smell of Rain (2001) |

Professional ratings
Review scores
| Source | Rating |
|---|---|
| Allmusic | 3/5 stars |
| Discogs | 4.7/5 stars |

The Stargate is an album by Norwegian solo artist Mortiis that was scheduled for release with the book Secrets of My Kingdom, alongside a limited gold press version of the CD, which was for unknown reasons later released in 2001, prior to The Smell of Rain. The LP was a 3-sided gatefold with a 12" fold-out lyric sheet. The fourth side was etched. Initially there was to be a large poster, however this was dropped by the record label. There was going to be a reprint of this CD, but it never happened.

== Track listing ==
1. "Child of Curiosity & the Old Man of Knowledge" - 5:33 (Mortiis)
2. "I am the World" - 6:18 (Mortiis)
3. "World Essence" - 5:58 (Trane)
4. "Across the World of Wonders" - 6:42 (Mortiis)
5. "(Passing by) an Old and Raped Village" - 5:09 (Trane)
6. "Towards the Gate of Stars" - 7:45 (Mortiis)
7. "Spirit of Conquest/the Warfare" - 9:16 (Mortiis)
8. "Army of Conquest/the Warfare (Ever Onwards)" - 13:04 (Trane)

== Personnel ==
- Sarah Jezebel Deva: Female Lead Vocal
- Kalle Metz: Male Lead Vocal, Additional Backing Vocal
- Mortiis: Keyboards, Synthesizers, Backing Vocal
- Niklas Trane: Acoustic Guitars

== Production ==
- Arranged By Mortiis
- Produced, Recorded, Engineered & Mixed By Mortiis, Niklas Trane & Conny Larsson
- Mastered By Mortiis

== Reissue ==
- Earache Records reissued the CD as part of a 3-CD set, along with Født til å Herske and Crypt of the Wizard. Remastered by Mortiis and repackaged in a deluxe embossed slipcase. It came included with liner notes by Tommy Udo.
