= Crypt of the Wizard =

1996 compilation album by Mortiis

Compilation album by Mortiis
- Released: 1996
- Recorded: Silverstone Studio, Fredrikstad, Norway, '95-'96
- Genre: Dungeon synth
- Label: Dark Dungeon Music; Earache Records
- Producer: Håvard Ellefsen

Mortiis chronology
Keiser Av En Dimensjon Ukjent (1995)	Crypt of the Wizard (1996)	The Stargate (1999)

Crypt of the Wizard is a compilation album by Norwegian solo artist Mortiis, released in 1996.

Recorded in Norway, it was initially a series of 5 12" EP singles, with the EPs press run consisting of 1,000 copies.

== Recording ==
Recording began in January 1996 at Silver Dragoon Studio, Norway,

== Track listing ==
- All Songs Written & Arranged By Mortiis.
1. "Ferden og Kallet (The Journey & The Call)" - 5:50
2. "Da Vi Bygde Tårnet (When We Raised the Tower)" - 8:02
3. "Under Tårnets Skygge (Underneath the Shadow of the Tower)" - 5:49
4. "En Sirkel av Kosmisk Kaos (A Circle of Cosmic Chaos)" - 7:31
5. "Vandrerens Sang (The Song of the Wanderer)" - 8:00
6. "Den Bortdrevne Regnbuen (The Banished Rainbow)" - 5:40
7. "Trollmannens Krypt (The Crypt of the Wizard)" - 6:10
8. "Stjernefødt (Starborn)" - 4:54
9. "I Mørket Drømmende (In the Darkness Dreaming)" - 5:58
10. "Fanget i Krystal (Captured in Crystal)" - 3:37

== Personnel ==
- Mortiis: Vocals, All Instruments

== Production ==
- Arranged, Produced, Recorded, Engineered, Mixed & Mastered By Mortiis.
- Layout by Dennis Ironmountain.

== Reissues ==
- Released by Dark Dungeon Music in 1997 as a compilation album on LP and CD.
- Earache Records issued the CD with new cover artwork on 1 November 1999.
- Earache Records reissued the CD as part of a 3-CD set, along with Født til å Herske and The Stargate. Remastered by Mortiis and repackaged in a deluxe embossed slipcase, it included liner notes by Tommy Udo and featured the original artwork from the LP.
