= Ånden som gjorde opprør =

Studio album by Mortiis
- Released: 1995
- Recorded: Sweden
- Genre: Dungeon synth; neoclassical dark wave
- Length: 39:36
- Label: Cold Meat Industry; Dark Dungeon Music
- Producer: Mortiis

Mortiis chronology
Født til å herske (1994)	Ånden som gjorde opprør (1995)	Keiser av en dimensjon ukjent (1995)

Ånden som gjorde opprør (lit. The Spirit Who Rebelled) is the second full-length album by Norwegian solo artist Mortiis and was released in 1995, a year after his debut album, Født til å Herske, and is the predecessor to Keiser Av En Dimensjon Ukjent. The album was released on CD and gatefold LP formats, with the latter being limited to 300 copies, which came with posters and postcards. The album was later reissued as a picture disc.

On January 9, 2007, the CD was reissued on Projekt Records. It was also issued as a gatefold LP, limited to 300 numbered copies, with posters and four postcards. The record was later issued by DDM as a picture disc, with three different pressruns of about 300 copies each.

The album was reworked and rerecorded for 2020 release Spirit of Rebellion. The project was instigated after Mortiis was invited to perform at the 25th anniversary celebrations for former label Cold Meat Industry in 2017, whereupon he decided to revisit the 1995 release with an updated sound.

== Track listing ==
1. "En mørk horisont" (A Dark Horizon) – 21:09
2. "Visjoner av en eldgammel fremtid" (Vision Of An Ancient Future) – 18:27
