= Keiser av en dimensjon ukjent =

Studio album by Mortiis
- Released: 1995
- Recorded: Sweden
- Genre: Dungeon synth
- Length: 52:35
- Label: Cold Meat Industry; The Ajna Offensive; Projekt Records
- Producer: Mortiis

Mortiis chronology
Ånden som gjorde opprør (1995)	Keiser av en dimensjon ukjent (1995)	Crypt of the Wizard (1996)

Keiser av en dimensjon ukjent (lit. Emperor of a Dimension Unknown) is the third full-length album from Norwegian solo artist Mortiis, which was released in 1995. It initially came on a golden CD, whereas the LP was a picture disc wrapped in a giant poster. This album was limited to 500 numbered copies. The LP was reissued for the US by The Ajna Offensive, with new artwork. It was limited to 300 copies, also coming with a booklet. It had previews of the then forthcoming book Secrets of My Kingdom.

On January 9, 2007, the CD was once again reissued, this time on Projekt Records.

== Reisene til grotter og ødemarker ==
Reisene til grotter og ødemarker (trans. "The Journeys to Grottoes and Wastelands") was also a music video released in 1996. This was the first video by Mortiis, and was filmed at Bohus Fortress in Sweden. There are 2,000 copies available of the VHS. The video was reissued on DVD in 2018, including a booklet of behind the scenes photography taken during filming.

== Track listing ==
1. "Reisene til grotter og ødemarker" (The Journeys to Grottoes and Wastelands) - 24:47
2. "Keiser av en dimensjon ukjent" (Emperor of a Dimension Unknown) - 27:48
