= Perfectly Defect =

Studio album by Mortiis
- Released: October 10, 2010
- Genre: Industrial rock
- Length: 40:48
- Label: Omnipresence Productions
- Producer: Mortiis

Mortiis chronology
Some Kind of Heroin (2007)	Perfectly Defect (2010)	The Great Deceiver (2016)

Professional ratings
Review scores
Source	Rating
COMA Music Magazine	(Favorable)

Perfectly Defect is an album by Mortiis, released 10 October 2010 initially as a free internet download, although later available through digital music shops such as iTunes. Prior to being released, the official Mortiis website had a countdown clock. The album was released in various formats including FLAC, MP3 and AAC.

A pressed CD version of the album by the name of "tour edition" was also released in limited numbers, mainly obtainable (as the name suggests) on the band's tour.

In 2018, a full 12 track version of the album was released commercially on CD/Vinyl/Digital formats. It included the original 8 tracks, plus four tracks recorded during the album's recording sessions, but were never made available until now.

== Track listing ==
- All songs written by H. Ellefsen.

No.	Title	Length
1.	"Closer to the End"	4:54
2.	"Perfectly Defect"	5:07
3.	"Sensation of Guilt"	6:16
4.	"Sole Defeat"	5:34
5.	"Thieving Bastards"	4:16
6.	"Halo of Arms"	5:19
7.	"Impossible to Believe"	3:24
8.	"This Absolution"	5:56

2018 Reissue
No.	Title	Length
1.	"Closer to the End"	4:56
2.	"Perfectly Defect"	5:06
3.	"The Sphere"	5:05
4.	"Sensation of Guilt"	6:14
5.	"Sole Defeat"	5:30
6.	"Thieving Bastards"	4:14
7.	"The Punished"	6:50
8.	"Halo of Arms"	5:19
9.	"Impossible to Believe"	3:23
10.	"This Absolution"	5:54
11.	"Hermaphro Superior"	5:01
12.	"Contrition"	2:40
