= Decadent & Desperate =

Single by Mortiis
- Released: 25 April 2005
- Recorded: Fredrikstad, Norway, 2005
- Genre: Industrial rock, electronic
- Length: 11:34
- Label: Earache Records
- Songwriter(s): Håvard Ellefsen
- Producer(s): Mortiis

"Decadent & Desperate" is the second single released by Norwegian industrial-rock solo artist Mortiis from the album The Grudge. It includes the previously unreleased track "Underdog", along with various remixes and live songs not featured on the album. All versions were limited and numbered editions. The music video shows Mortiis both with and without his prosthetic make-up.

== Track listing ==
Digipak CD version

1. "Decadent & Desperate" – 3:24
2. "Underdog" – 4:19
3. "Gibber (gibbering idiot)" – 3:51

Red/Green cover vinyl

1. "Decadent & Desperate" – 4:28
2. "Parasite God (live in London)" – 6:01

Exclusive iTunes tracks

1. "Decadent & Desperate" – 3:24
2. "Way Too Wicked (Absinthium Mix)" – 4:33
