= Soul in a Hole =

Video by Mortiis
- Released: September 26, 2005
- Recorded: 2004
- Genre: Industrial rock Industrial metal
- Label: Earache Records
- Producer: Mortiis

Soul in a Hole is an at home concert video by Mortiis. It was recorded in London at the Hackney Ocean during the Unlimited Grudge Tour in September 2004. A limited set of 300 came with a poster; These were only available when pre-ordered from the official Mortiis site.

Ltd edition poster

== Track listing ==
Live Video:

1. "Intro"
2. "Broken Skin"
3. "Way Too Wicked"
4. "Marshland"
5. "The Worst in Me"
6. "Monolith"
7. "Gibber"
8. "Decadent & Desperate"
9. "Parasite God"
10. "The Loneliest Thing"
11. "Asthma"
12. "The Grudge"
13. "Smell the Witch"
14. "Mental Maelstrom"
15. "Le Petit Cochon Sordide"

Video tracks:

1. "Parasite God"
2. "Mental Maelstrom (implode)"
3. "The Grudge"
4. "Decadent & Desperate (absentia)"

Bonus material:

1. "Mortiis Interview"
2. "'The Grudge' TV advert"
3. "'The Grudge' EPK"
4. "Picture Gallery"

== Miscellaneous ==
- The uncensored version of the Decadent & Desperate video could be accessed by going to the Video's menu, highlighting 'Menu' and pressing left twice. Or alternatively by clicking the Mortiis logo on the left hand side with a mouse.
- The song 'Monolith' was replaced with 'Underdog' for the 'Soul in a Hole 2005' promotional tour.
- The real name to 'Intro' is 'I Die in My Dreams'.
