= Shine (Gwen Stefani song) =

2015 song by Gwen Stefani

Promotional single by Gwen Stefani featuring Pharrell Williams
- Released: January 13, 2015
- Recorded: 2014
- Genre: Reggae pop; ska
- Length: 3:24
- Label: The Weinstein Company
- Songwriters: Gwen Stefani; Pharrell Williams
- Producer: Pharrell Williams

"Shine" is a song written and recorded by American singer Gwen Stefani featuring Pharrell Williams, who also produced the song. Originally intended for Stefani's band No Doubt, it is a reggae pop and ska song that was written for the 2014 live-action/animated film Paddington. The lyrics revolve around the lead character Paddington Bear's journey to London and his identity crisis. Stefani initially disagreed with Williams's choice to use direct references to Paddington in the lyrics, but praised this decision after watching the film with her children. She reported that her involvement with the recording was inspired by her then-husband Gavin Rossdale and her children's connection to England.

A lyric video for the track was released on January 13, 2015, on The Weinstein Company's YouTube channel, and included on the DVD and Blu-ray releases of the film. The song was featured in the American trailer for the movie, and made available as a promotional CD as a result of its submission for the Academy Award for Best Original Song. Although a low-quality version leaked on December 31, 2014, a full version of the recording was not released for public consumption. It was omitted from the film's soundtrack album, as well as Stefani's third studio album This Is What the Truth Feels Like (2016). Critical response to "Shine" was mixed; some praised Stefani and Williams's chemistry, while others compared it negatively to their previous collaborations. Commentators frequently likened it to Williams's 2013 single "Happy" and Stefani's 2014 song "Spark the Fire".

== Concept and development ==
"There's such a connection being married to an Englishman and having these kids and going to England all these years and the story. There are just so many reasons it was attractive to me."

— Gwen Stefani discussing her decision to work on a song for Paddington

"Shine" was written by Pharrell Williams and Gwen Stefani, and the recording was produced by Williams. In November 2014, the pair announced that they were collaborating on a recording for the live-action/animated film Paddington. They had previously worked together on four singles: "Hella Good" (2002), "Can I Have It Like That" (2005), "Hollaback Girl" (2005), and "Spark the Fire" (2014).

Williams initially pitched "Shine" as a song for No Doubt, of which Stefani was lead vocalist. She immediately noticed similarities between the demo and her music with No Doubt and played it for the rest of the band to get their reaction. No Doubt recorded their version in late 2014. According to Rolling Stone, Stefani was collaborating with the band for a song for the Paddington soundtrack. Despite this announcement, Rolling Stone's Patrick Doyle suggested that it would be recorded by Williams and Stefani instead.

In an official statement, film executive Bob Weinstein called Stefani and Williams "the perfect artistic duo", saying their work "brought to life the charm that Paddington represents". Stefani said her involvement was motivated by her personal connection to the film's setting through her marriage to English musician Gavin Rossdale. She added that the film and the track allowed her children to recognize their origins. Williams considered the song to be "a wonderful opportunity, as a parent, to contribute to something as classic, authentic and generational to all of our lives, as Paddington Bear"; Stefani said that she was "honored to join forces with Pharrell and be part of bringing this beloved classic to life for Paddington's next big adventure". Williams called the song "a trailer into a wonderful family experience" and developed its concept from his children's interest in Paddington Bear.

== Composition and lyrical interpretation ==
"Shine"
A 22-second audio sample of the song, showing Stefani chanting the hook "Shine"; the instrumental was described as a "ska-flecked romp of pumped-up foghorns and plodding brass".

"Shine" is a reggae pop and ska song that lasts three minutes and 24 seconds. It is composed in the key of E minor using common time and a moderately fast tempo of 140 beats per minute. Instrumentation is provided by strings, horns, a guitar, and a piano, to create what Music Times' Carolyn Menyes described as a "crawling beat". March Robisch of Thought Catalog described the single as having "that ska quality that made No Doubt so successful". Digital Spy's Lewis Corner and Amy Davidson wrote that it is a "ska-flecked romp of pumped-up foghorns and plodding brass". A writer from Capital XTRA described it as having a "mellow beat", while Rolling Stone's Daniel Sannwald wrote it has a "party-vibe production".

During the track, Stefani's vocal range spans from the low note of D_{3} to the high note of A_{4}. Williams equated Stefani's tone to that of a "child whisperer" due to her ability to make music that appeals to children. The lyrics are about Paddington Bear and his travels; Rolling Stone called it "a pop-reggae allegory about a bear with an identity crisis". The song opens with Stefani singing the first verse and Williams joining in the chorus, the lyrics including "When you're trying to get home / When you don't wanna be alone / Look at yourself in the mirror / That's your way home". The hook features Stefani repeatedly singing "Shine!" and Williams screaming "Hey!". Andy Morris from Gigwise noted the lyrics, "So we're in a strange new land in Paddington station / But you end up in good hands in the fancy British nation" and "that bear with the red hat", as obvious references to Paddington. According to Sannwald, the lyrics include "Pharrell's 'Happy"-ish 'Everybody is the same inside' bridge" that allows the song to appeal to both children and their parents "without sounding overly patronizing". "Shine" ends with Williams singing in the falsetto register.

When discussing the development of the single with MTV News, Stefani said that she initially disagreed with Williams's approach to the lyrics. Williams was more "specific" regarding the lyrics as he wanted to include words directly connected to the film and its character like "bear", "Paddington", and "station"; Stefani said that she preferred for the song to be a "little more abstract". She later reversed this view, saying that she agreed with Williams's interpretation after watching the film with her children and seeing the complete animations of the Paddington Bear character. In an interview with American Top 40, Stefani credited Williams as being central to the recording's development, saying that he was "the one who really got in there and was able to channel the film lyrically and make it really happen".

== Critical reception ==
"Shine" received mixed reviews from music critics. E! News' Bruna Nessif gave the single a positive review, stating: "When it comes to feel-good music, leave it up to Gwen Stefani and Pharrell to get the job done". A reviewer from Vibe praised it as "the perfect theme song". Abe Dewing, a member of the Cambridge Symphony Orchestra, described it as a "sharp, hip tune" in the Boston Herald. He compared its opening trumpet riff to music by British composer Herbert Chappell, who created the theme for the 1975 television series Paddington. Chappell also composed music for the 1986 concerto "Paddington Bear's First Concert". Dewing praised Stefani and Willams's ability "to compose new music for existing source material intended for children". A reviewer from the website antiMusic described the recording as "even more feel good" than the pair's collaboration on "Spark the Fire". Daniel Sannwald gave it three and a half stars out of five, favorably comparing its melody to the chorus of Irish rock band The Cranberries's 1994 single "Zombie". He felt that it would appeal to both children and their parents.

Some reviewers criticized "Shine" for lacking the energy of Williams's and Stefani's previous releases. MTV's John Walker questioned whether it could repeat the success of Williams's previous single "Happy" from the 2013 animated film Despicable Me 2. In response to the leaked version, Carolyn Menyes wrote that it was too slow in comparison to the "crazy, happy beats and earwormmy hand claps" of "Happy" and the "inane catchiness" of Stefani's previous singles "Spark the Fire" and "Baby Don't Lie" (2014). Menyes was critical of Stefani's vocals, saying she used "an oddly harsh tone" throughout the track. Steven Pond of TheWrap wrote that Stefani's vocal delivery "never quite crosses the line to catchy".

== Promotion and music video ==
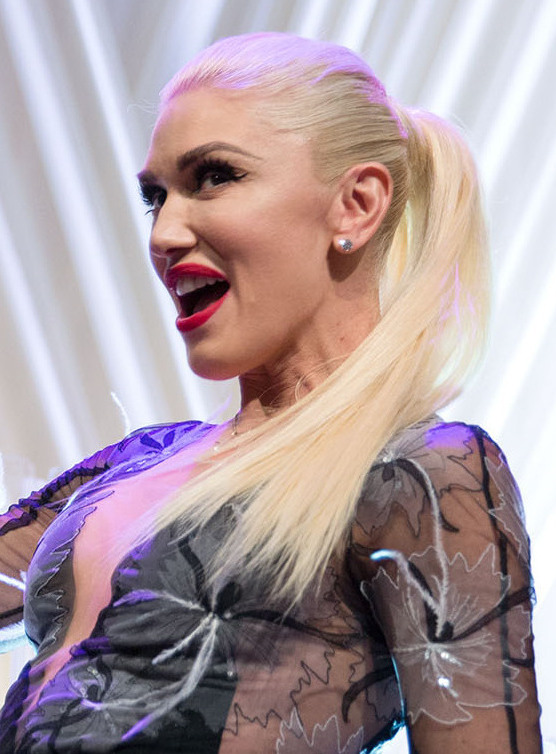
Gwen Stefani in 2016

Although a low-quality version leaked on December 31, 2014, a full version of the recording was not made available for the public. A limited quantity edition CD single was issued in January 2015, and sent to the Academy of Motion Picture Arts and Sciences as part of the submission process to be considered for the Academy Award for Best Original Song. The single was included in the list of 79 contenders for the award, but it did not receive a nomination.

A lyric video was uploaded onto The Weinstein Company's YouTube channel on January 13, 2015. It was a minute and 35 seconds, and featured clips from the film. The video received over two million views in 24 hours. The video featured scenes from the film in which "the iconic Peruvian bear finds himself in all manner of mishaps while trying to find a home and ultimately working his way into our hearts". The visual was included on the DVD and Blu-ray releases of Paddington along with a behind-the-scenes feature on the making of the track. Matthew Jacobson of The Spectrum, a newspaper which is part of the USA Today Network, criticized the video for being "just clips of the movie set to a song" rather than a proper music video. Alternatively, Cinemablend.com's Jessica Rawden found the video to be "satsifying".

"Shine" is featured in the American trailer and the closing credits for Paddington, but was not included in the British version of the film. Idolator's Christina Lee wrote that the track was an exclusive release for the United States and Canada. The song was excluded from the film's soundtrack album, as well as Stefani's third studio album, This Is What the Truth Feels Like (2016). During an interview with Stefani and Williams on January 21, 2015, radio host Ryan Seacrest erroneously announced the track was available for purchase on the iTunes Store.

== Credits and personnel ==
Credits adapted from the American Society of Composers, Authors and Publishers:

Management

- ASCAP/Harajuku Lover Music
- Gwen Stefani appears courtesy of Interscope Records.
- Pharrell Williams appears courtesy of Columbia Records and i am OTHER Entertainment.

Personnel

- Writers – Gwen Renee Stefani, Pharrell Williams
- Performance – Gwen Stefani, Pharrell Williams

== Release history ==
Region	Date	Format	Label
United States	January 13, 2015	CD single	The Weinstein Company

== See also ==
- List of songs recorded by Gwen Stefani
