= Some Kind of Heroin =

Remix album by Mortiis
- Released: April 16th, 2007
- Recorded: Frederikstad Norway, 2005 – 2007
- Genre: Electronic; industrial rock
- Length: 1:18:36
- Label: Earache Records
- Producer: Mortiis

Mortiis chronology
The Grudge (2004)	Some Kind of Heroin (2007)	Perfectly Defect (2010)

Professional ratings
Review scores
Source	Rating
Metal Hammer	6/10 stars

Some Kind of Heroin is the first remix album by Norwegian solo artist Mortiis. The album is a collection of remixes of songs taken from Mortiis' previous album The Grudge.

In a press release Mortiis has said:

I'm really stoked we finally got to do a remix album and since it's been in process for quite some time now I'm happy to be able to finally release it. I've always been fascinated with taking songs and twisting them into something different, the ability to grab the elements you like and put them into a totally different environment. The flexibility of that really appeals to me.

I think the mixes all those guys did came out really cool, many of them vastly different from what would have come out of the studio if I had done them. It's cool to see what happens when you let other people inside your head, so to speak. I think the variety of mixers and sonic realms created here will appeal to a large variety of people.

== Track listing ==
1. "Underdog (Zombie Girl Remix)" – 6:07
2. "The Grudge (Gothminister Mix)" – 3:28
3. "Twist The Knife (The Gibbering Mix By Implant)" – 4:41
4. "Broken Skin Feat. Stephan Groth (Septic Wound Mix By XP8)" – 6:02
5. "The Grudge (Mental Siege Mix)" – 5:38
6. "Gibber (PIG Remix)" – 6:24
7. "Way Too Wicked (Rape, Dope And The American Way Mix By The Kovenant)" – 4:25
8. "Gibber (Lysergic Club Mix By Velvet Acid Christ)" – 4:18
9. "The Worst In Me (Girls Under Glass Mix)" – 6:03
10. "The Grudge (David Wallace Remix)" – 2:04
11. "Broken Skin Feat. Stephan Groth (Funker Vogt Remix)" – 7:06
12. "The Grudge (Emotional Heresy By Kubrick)" – 6:45
13. "Decadent & Desperate (Therafuck Remix By Dope Stars)" – 2:33
14. "Gibber (Gibbering Idiot)" – 3:52
15. "Way too Wicked (Absinthium Mix)" – 4:30
16. "The Worst in Me (Extraction Mix By In the Nursery)" – 4:40
