= London Is the Place for Me =

1948 song by Aldwyn Roberts a.k.a. Lord Kitchener

"London Is the Place for Me" is a 1948 calypso song by Aldwyn Roberts. Roberts, under his calypso stage name Lord Kitchener, sang the first two stanzas of "London Is the Place for Me" on camera for reporters upon arrival at Tilbury Docks on the HMT Empire Windrush, and was recorded by Pathé News cameras. Roberts, as Lord Kitchener, did not record the song until 1951. The song was also popularised during the 1950s (1954) by bandleader Edmundo Ros.

London Is the Place for Me is also the name of a series of compilation albums from Honest Jon's, featuring the music of young Black London in the years after World War II, particularly the music of West Indian and West African expatriates. As of 2019, the label had released eight titles in the series.

== Cover versions ==
The song was covered by D Lime – featuring Tobago Crusoe for the 2014 film Paddington.

Paul Kelly used the song's music for "Shane Warne".
