= The Smell of Rain =

Studio album by Mortiis
- Released: October 17, 2001
- Recorded: A Studio (Sweden), 2001
- Genre: Dark wave; electropop
- Length: 50:54
- Label: Earache Records
- Producer: Håvard Ellefsen

Mortiis chronology
The Stargate (1999)	The Smell of Rain (2001)	The Grudge (2004)

Professional ratings
Review scores
Source	Rating
AllMusic	3/5 stars
Rock Sound	4/5 stars

The Smell of Rain is an album released by solo artist Mortiis in 2001. Released in 2001 under the Earache label. This was the first album where Mortiis took the role as lead vocalist, which had previously been filled by Sarah Jezebel Deva.

== Release and background ==
The initial CD press run for Germany contained a bonus DVD including the 'Parasite God' video. The LP was a double gatefold with a 12" lyric insert. A remastered version was released later, as Mortiis requested. It contained four remixed songs. Initial attempts at getting the CD booklet printed as transparent layers of art and text was turned down by the label, several times. Though this was done for the next album (The Grudge) as a "Strictly Ltd Edition 'Decadent' PVC Sleeve".

The artwork was produced by Johan Hammarman. On the back of the album, there is a circle with symbols inside. This is a form of the 'Secret Seal of Solomon'. In the booklet, Mortiis is seen unmasked under the pseudonym of 'John Prozac'.

== Track listing ==
- All songs written by Mortiis.
1. "Scar Trek / Parasite God" – 6:02
2. "Flux / Mental Maelstrom" – 6:46
3. "Spirit in a Vacuum" – 4:53
4. "Monolith" – 3:59
5. "You Put a Hex on Me" – 5:45
6. "Everyone Leaves" – 6:41
7. "Marshland" – 4:43
8. "Antimental" – 6:17
9. "Smell the Witch" – 5:43

The following tracks were remixes available on a special remastered edition released in 2002:

1. "Paranoid God Pt.1 (the iconoclast mix)" – 7:00 - Brian Lustmord
2. "Marshland (the excursion mix)" – 4:40 - Raven Fox
3. "Monolithic dub" – 7:44 - Brian Lustmord
4. "You Put a Hex on Me" – 3:51 - Tarmvred

== Personnel ==
- Mortiis – lead vocal, keyboards, synthesizers, synth programming, drum programming
- Martina Binder – additional lead vocal
- Sarah Jezebel Deva – vocal harmonies, Soprano vocal
- Mika Lindberg, "Raptor", Suvi-Tuulia Virtanen – Alto vocals
- Chris A. – guitars
- Alzahr – bass
- Staffan Wieslander, Åsa Anveden – cello
- Cecilia Lindgren, Johanna Wetter – violin
- Frederik Bergstrom – tympani, percussion

== Production ==
- Arranged, produced, recorded and engineered by Mortiis
- Percussion recorded and engineered by Erik Lundberg
- Mixed by Rickard Bengtsson and Mortiis
- Mastered by Rickard Bengtsson
