= Født til å herske =

Studio album by Mortiis
- Released: 1994
- Recorded: Sweden
- Genre: Dungeon synth
- Length: 53:00
- Label: Malicious Records; Dark Dungeon Music; Earache Records
- Producer: Mortiis

Mortiis chronology
The Song of a Long Forgotten Ghost (1993)	Født til å herske (1994)	Ånden som gjorde opprør (1995)

Professional ratings
Review scores
Source	Rating
Allmusic	3/5 stars

Født til å herske (lit. "Born to rule") is Norwegian solo artist Mortiis's debut album, released on Malicious Records in 1994. It consists of one long song, split into two tracks. Due to misprints, several press runs of the CD state different labels.

== Track listing ==
1. Født til å herske (Pt. 1) (27:37)
2. Født til å herske (Pt. 2) (25:23)

== Reissues ==
- Two limited edition gatefold LP versions of the album were released, with 500 copies on black vinyl, and 500 copies on purple vinyl. Both came with a free poster.
- Another reissue, by Mortiis' own label Dark Dungeon Music, featured a similar gatefold sleeve, but with different artwork and a new poster. The first 500 copies were released on gold vinyl, each hand-numbered and signed by Mortiis.
- Released again by DDM in a limited copy of 100 grey vinyl with similar artwork to the gold pressing.
- Projekt Records, an American record label, updated the CD version by including new artwork upon re-release. This was only available in the United States.
- Earache Records reissued the CD, but kept the original artwork, choosing to release this internationally.
- Earache Records reissued the CD again as part of a 3-CD set, along with Crypt of the Wizard and The Stargate. Remastered by Mortiis and repackaged in a deluxe embossed slipcase, it included liner notes by Tommy Udo and featured the original artwork.
