= The Grudge (album) =

Studio album by Mortiis
- Released: September 13th, 2004
- Recorded: Frederikstad Norway, 2003 - 2004
- Genre: Industrial rock; industrial metal
- Length: 46:38
- Label: Earache Records
- Producer: Mortiis, Vegard Blomberg

Mortiis chronology
The Smell of Rain (2001)	The Grudge (2004)	Some Kind of Heroin (2007)

Alternative cover
- Alternate Album Art Ltd Ed

Professional ratings
Review scores
Source	Rating
Allmusic	3.5/5 stars

The Grudge is an album released by Mortiis. It was recorded at Silvertone Studios in Fredrikstad, Norway in 2003 and 2004 and released in 2004. The artwork was done by Jean Sebastian Rossbach of the Living Rope Design. The album is more metal-leaning and aggressive, whereas the previous release was more melodic.

== Track listing ==
- All Songs Written by Mortiis, Levi Gawron, Asmund Sveinunggard & Leo Troy.
1. "Broken Skin" – 5:30
2. "Way Too Wicked" – 4:37
3. "The Grudge" – 5:35
4. "Decadent & Desperate" – 3:24
5. "The Worst in Me" – 7:09
6. "Gibber" – 4:18
7. "Twist the Knife" – 4:13
8. "The Loneliest Thing" – 4:53
9. "Le Petit Cochon Sordide" – 4:33
10. "Asthma" – 2:26

The following tracks were released on the German version and on "The Grudge" single:

1. "The Grudge (Despectus)" – 4:41
2. "Decadent & Desperate (Flickin' the Bitch Switch mix)" – 4:35

== Personnel ==
=== Mortiis ===
- Mortiis: Vocal, Keyboards, Synthesizers, Programming
- Levi Gawron: Guitars
- Asmund Sveinunggard: Guitars
- Leo Troy: Drums, Percussion

=== Additional Musicians ===
- Vegard Blomberg: Acoustic Guitars
- Endre Tønnesen: Bass on tracks 1, 5, 7, 8 & 10
- Magnus Abelsen: Bass on track 9
- Joe Gibber, Vegard Blomberg: Keyboards, Programming
- Louise Marie Degnzman Pedersen, Stephan Groth: Vocal Backing

== Production ==
- Arranged by Mortiis
- Produced by Mortiis & Vegard Blomberg
- Engineered by Mortiis
- Mixed by Mortiis, Levi Gawron, Rune Jorgenson & Vegard Blomberg
- Digital Editing: Mortiis, Levi Gawron & Vegard Blomberg
- Mastered by Espen Berg
