= Paddington (film) =

2014 film by Paul King

- Theatrical release poster
- Directed by: Paul King
- Screenplay by: Paul King
- Story by: Hamish McColl; Paul King
- Based on: Paddington Bear by Michael Bond
- Produced by: David Heyman
- Starring: Hugh Bonneville; Sally Hawkins; Julie Walters; Jim Broadbent; Peter Capaldi; Nicole Kidman; Ben Whishaw
- Cinematography: Erik Wilson
- Edited by: Mark Everson
- Music by: Nick Urata
- Production companies: StudioCanal; Heyday Films; TF1 Films Production; Anton Capital Entertainment
- Distributed by: StudioCanal
- Release dates: 28 November 2014 (United Kingdom); 3 December 2014 (France)
- Running time: 95 minutes
- Countries: United Kingdom; France
- Language: English
- Budget: €38.5 million; ($65 million (gross) $54.7 million (net))
- Box office: $326.1 million

Paddington is a 2014 comedy film written and directed by Paul King. It was developed from a story by King and Hamish McColl, which was based on the stories of the character Paddington Bear created by Michael Bond. Produced by David Heyman, Paddington stars Ben Whishaw as the voice of the title character, with Hugh Bonneville, Sally Hawkins, Julie Walters, Jim Broadbent, Peter Capaldi, and Nicole Kidman in live-action roles. The film follows Paddington, an anthropomorphic bear who migrates from the jungles of "Darkest Peru" to the streets of London, where he meets the Brown family, unaware he is being pursued by a taxidermist.

A British and French venture produced by StudioCanal UK, Heyday Films, TF1 Films Production and Anton Capital Entertainment, Paddington's principal photography began in September 2013 and wrapped up in June 2014. Colin Firth was originally set to voice Paddington, but dropped out in post-production and was replaced by Whishaw.

Paddington was released in the United Kingdom on 28 November 2014 and in France on 3 December. Paddington was released in the United States by The Weinstein Company through TWC-Dimension on January 16, 2015. The film received critical acclaim, and grossed $326 million against a €38.5 million budget. It received two nominations at the BAFTAs: Best British Film and Best Adapted Screenplay. It spawned a film series with two sequels: Paddington 2 (2017) and Paddington in Peru (2024).

== Plot ==
In the deep jungles of Peru, a British explorer discovers two members of a rare, unknown species of bear, and learns that they are intelligent, capable of human speech, and have a deep fondness for marmalade. He names them Lucy and Pastuzo and gives them his hat as he leaves, telling them that they are always welcome in London. About 40 years later, after Pastuzo is killed by an earthquake, Lucy encourages their orphaned nephew to travel to London while she moves into the Home for Retired Bears.

The cub arrives in London after stowing away on a cargo ship and reaches Paddington station. He meets the Brown family, who take him home and name him after the station they found him in. The father Henry disbelieves Paddington's story and initially does not want to help him, but his wife Mary, their adventurous son Jonathan, their multilingual but unconfident daughter Judy and their housekeeper Mrs Bird come to find Paddington endearing.

Paddington thinks he can find a home with the explorer who met Lucy and Pastuzo, but does not know his name. Mary takes Paddington to Samuel Gruber, an antique shop owner, who discovers that the hat bears the stamp of the Geographers' Guild. After they are initially denied access to the Guild archive, Paddington sneaks in, with Mr Brown helping him by dressing up as a cleaning woman to distract the guard. Paddington learns from the Guild archive that an expedition to Peru was undertaken by an explorer named Montgomery Clyde, but the Guild erased their record of it.

Meanwhile, Millicent Clyde, a taxidermist at the Natural History Museum, learns of Paddington's existence and sets out to find him, wishing to add him to her collection. Scheming with the Browns' next-door neighbour, Mr Curry, Millicent sneaks in while the Browns are out and attempts to capture Paddington. As he defends himself, he inadvertently starts a fire, and when Henry and Mary disbelieve Paddington's version of events, he leaves the house and attempts to find Montgomery Clyde himself, using a phone book to track down every "M. Clyde" in London.

Paddington eventually finds Millicent and learns that Montgomery was her father. Driven by resentment towards her father for refusing to bring a Peruvian bear home, Millicent lures Paddington back to the museum and tranquillises him. Mr Curry discovers Millicent's true intentions and warns the Browns, who come to Paddington's rescue and manage to defeat her; she is sentenced to community service in her father's petting zoo, and the Browns allow Paddington to stay in their house permanently.

== Cast ==
- Hugh Bonneville as Henry Brown
- Sally Hawkins as Mary Brown
- Julie Walters as Mrs Bird
- Jim Broadbent as Samuel Gruber
- Peter Capaldi as Mr Curry
- Matt Lucas as Joe, a taxi driver
- Kayvan Novak as Grant
- Madeleine Harris as Judy Brown
- Samuel Joslin as Jonathan Brown
- Michael Gambon as the voice of Uncle Pastuzo
- Imelda Staunton as the voice of Aunt Lucy
- Nicole Kidman as Millicent Clyde
  - Lottie Steer as young Millicent
- Ben Whishaw as the voice of Paddington Bear
  - In the Ukrainian dub, Paddington was voiced by Volodymyr Zelenskyy, who went on to become the president of Ukraine.
- Tim Downie as Montgomery Clyde
- Madeleine Worrall as Agatha Clyde
- Geoffrey Palmer as the head geographer
- Michael Bond as the kindly gentleman
- Jude Wright as Tony
- Matt King as Andre, a thief
- Steve Edge as the Natural History Museum security guard
- Alice Lowe as the Geographer's Guild receptionist
- Simon Farnaby as Barry, a security guard

== Production ==
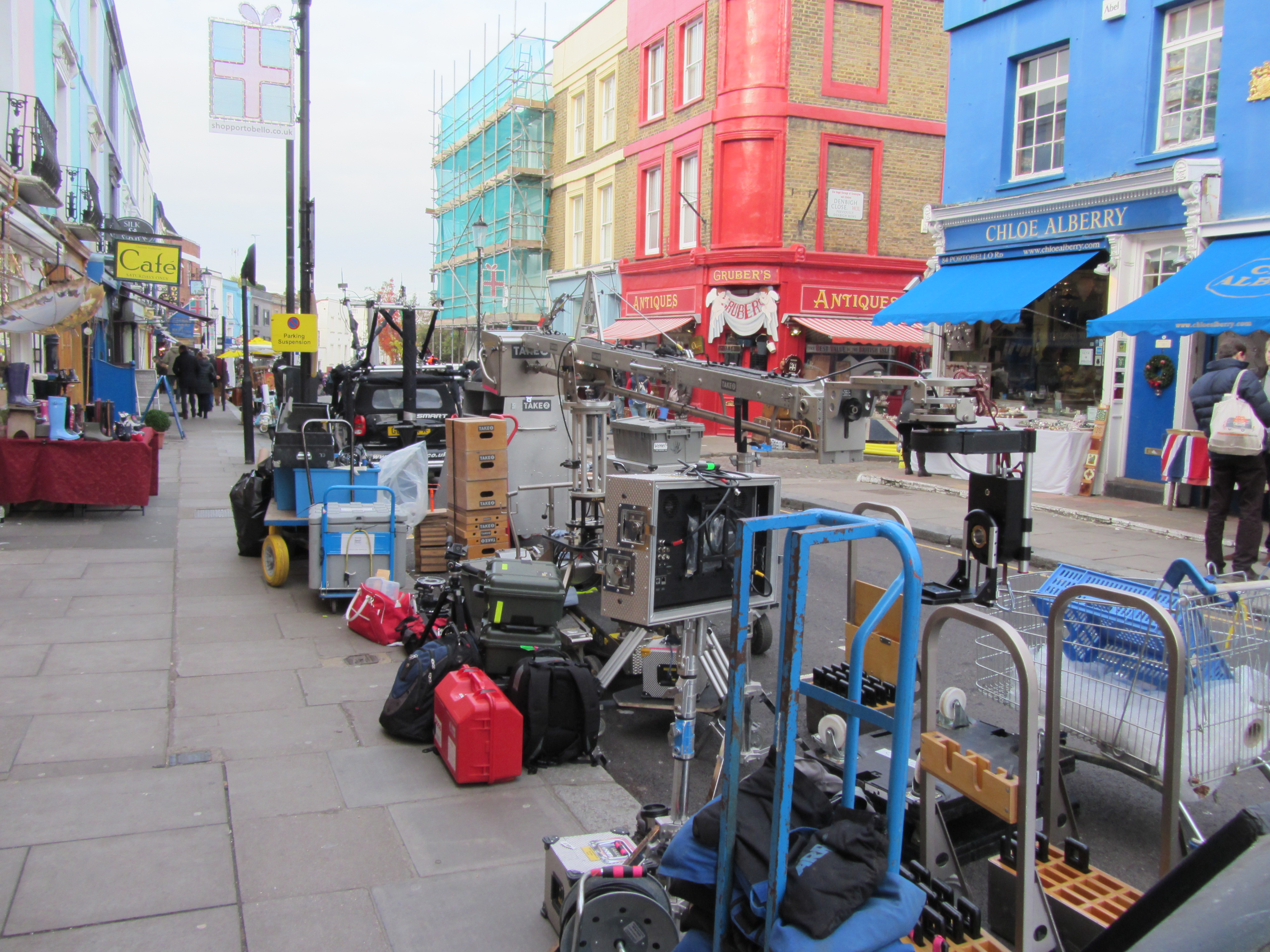
Filming equipment for Paddington on Portobello Road, London in 2013

The film was first announced in September 2007, with David Heyman producing and Hamish McColl writing the screenplay. King conceived the film as a story about inclusiveness, kindness towards strangers and the meaning of family. He later said that he wanted the film's themes to be broader than contemporary British debates over immigration, describing its central concern as whether a family should be a closed, self-protective unit or one willing to accept outsiders.

King cited The Kid (1921) by Charlie Chaplin as an important influence, noting the similarity between its story of a reluctant adoptive father and the relationship between Paddington and Henry Brown. He also drew on London's history of immigration when adapting the books, including the use of calypso music associated with the Windrush generation. King also expanded the immigrant background of Mr Gruber, depicting him as having arrived in Britain as a refugee in 1938. King later confirmed that the reference to the Kindertransport was his own addition rather than an element taken directly from Bond's books.

Further developments were not made until September 2013, when filming began and Heyman announced the casting of Colin Firth as Paddington. With a budget of €38.5 million ($50–55 million), Paddington is the most expensive film produced by the French production company StudioCanal. Principal photography and production began on 13 September 2013.

Filming locations for Paddington were mostly in West London. The Paddington Station scenes were mostly filmed inside London Paddington station, although the exterior establishing shot used the front entrance of nearby Marylebone Station in Marylebone. Exterior shots of the Brown family home in Windsor Gardens were shot in Chalcot Crescent in Primrose Hill. Scenes in Mr Gruber's shop were filmed inside an antique shop on Portobello Road, and the skateboard chase sequence was filmed in Portobello Road Market and Maida Vale. For the fictional Tube station, Westbourne Oak, three separate locations were used: the entrance hall at Maida Vale tube station, on the escalators inside St John's Wood tube station, and on the disused Jubilee line platforms in Charing Cross tube station. The exterior and entrance hall of the Reform Club on Pall Mall served at the location for the Geographers' Guild, while the other interior scenes were filmed inside Hatfield House in Hertfordshire. Museum scenes were shot at the Natural History Museum in South Kensington, and a house on Downshire Hill in Hampstead served as the home of Millicent Clyde.

In June 2014, after principal photography had wrapped, Firth voluntarily dropped out of the film, after the studio decided his voice was not suitable for Paddington. The role was recast the following month, with Ben Whishaw signing on to voice the title role. Paddington was created using a combination of motion capture and computer animation by the British visual effects company Framestore.

Filming locations for Paddington

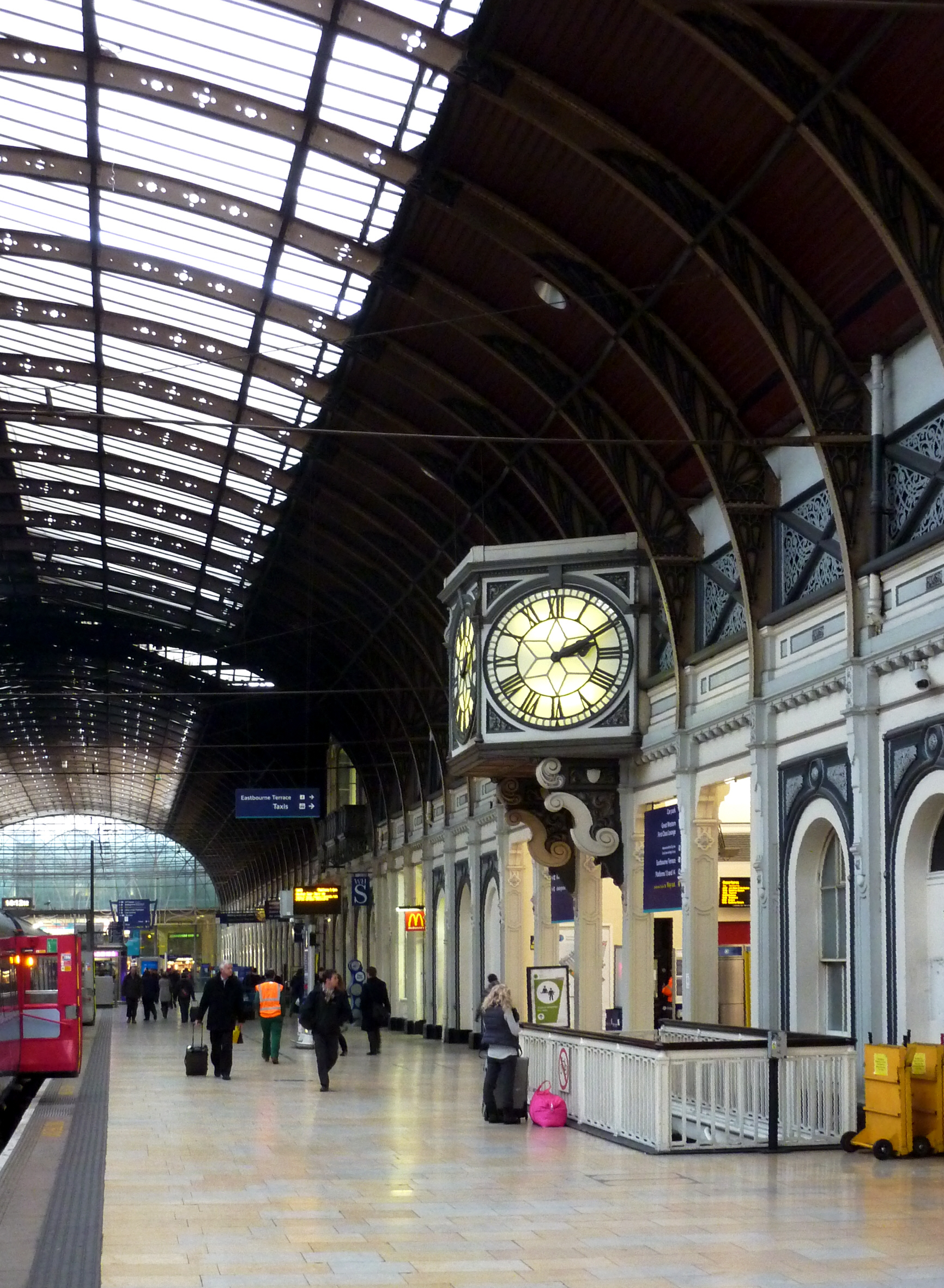
London Paddington Station

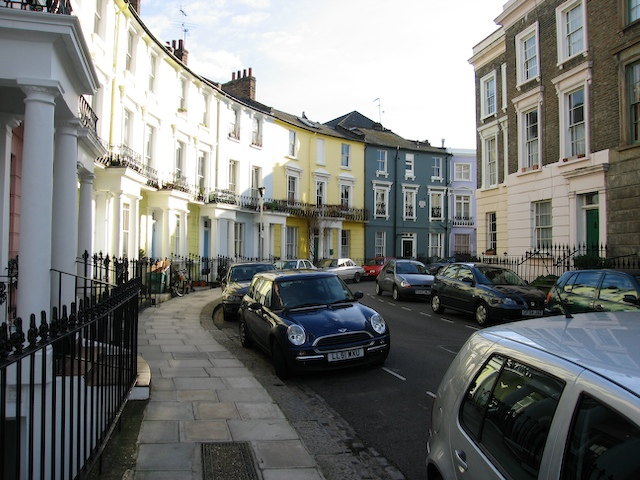
Chalcot Crescent, Primrose Hill
(Windsor Gardens)

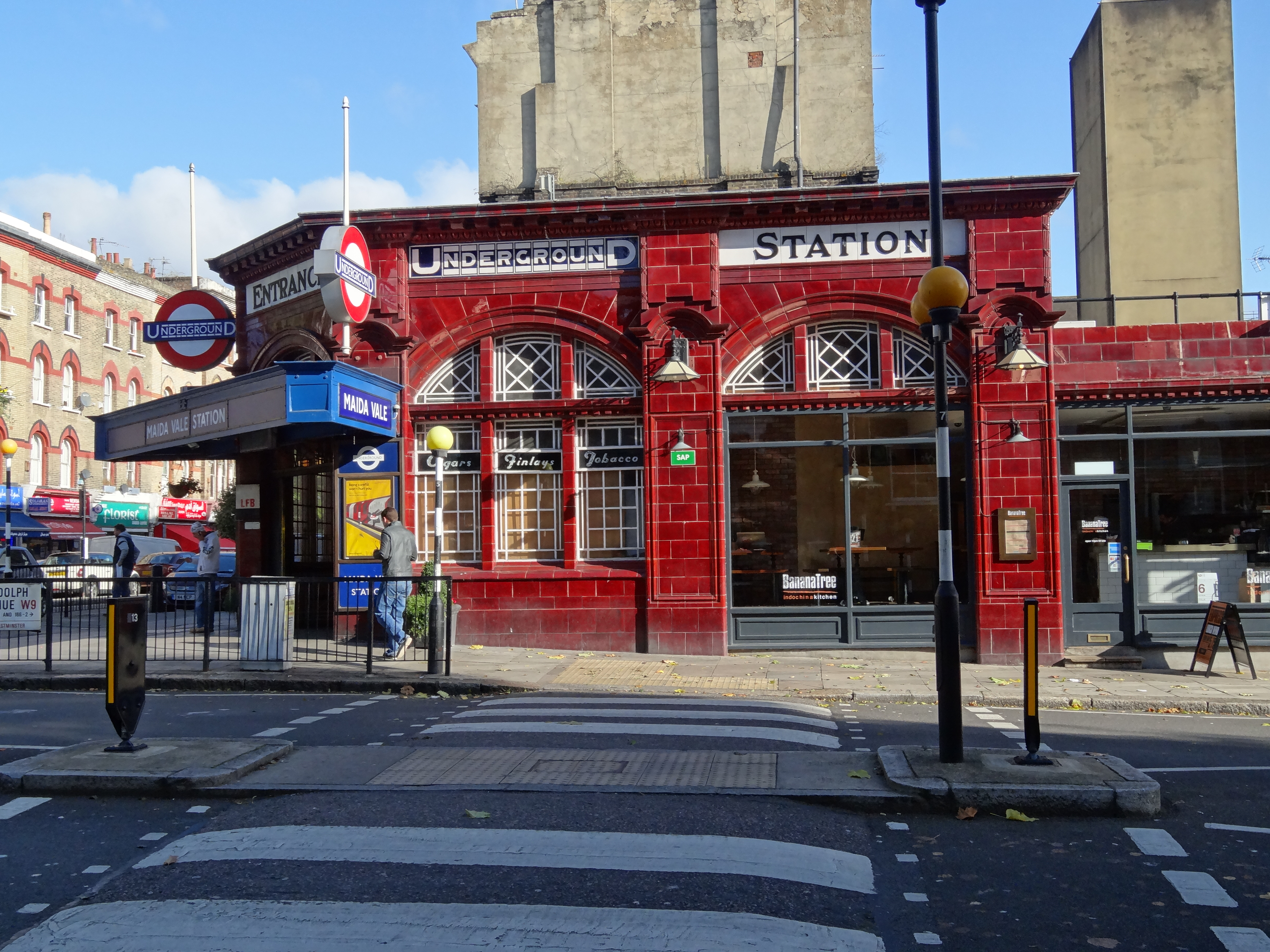
Maida Vale Tube Station
(Westbourne Oak Tube Station)

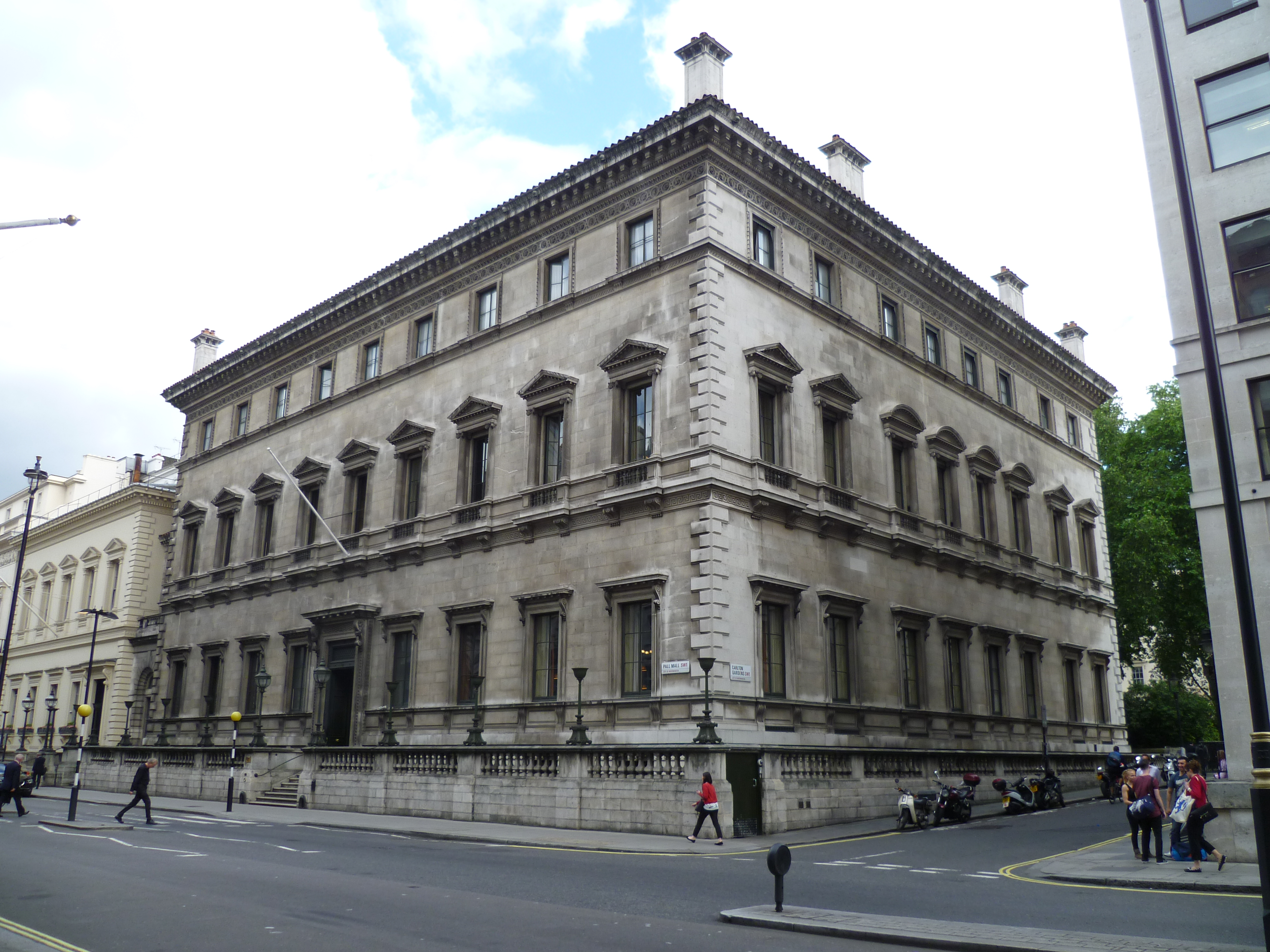
The Reform Club on Pall Mall
(the Geographers' Guild)

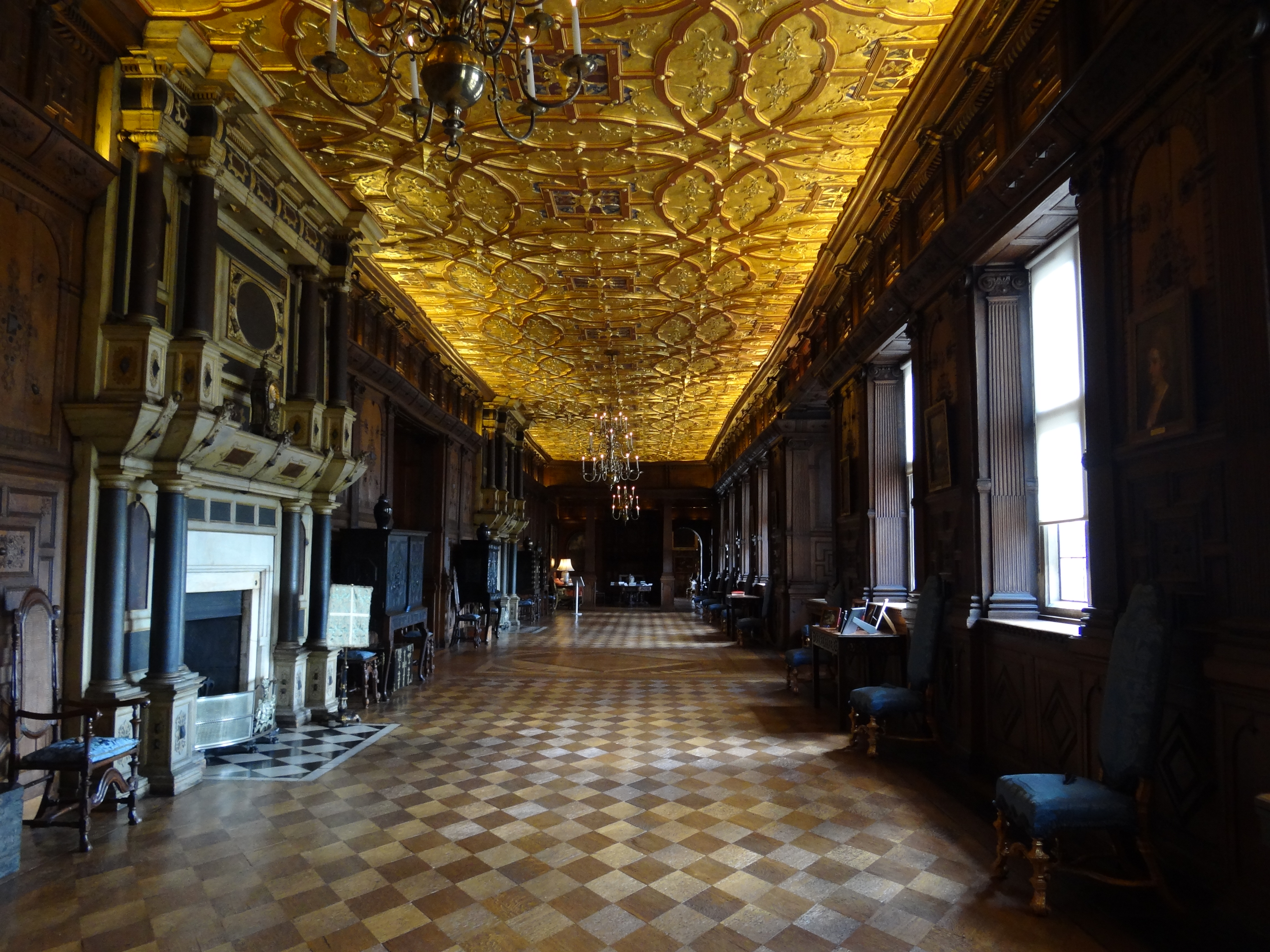
Hatfield House, Hertfordshire
(the Geographers' Guild)

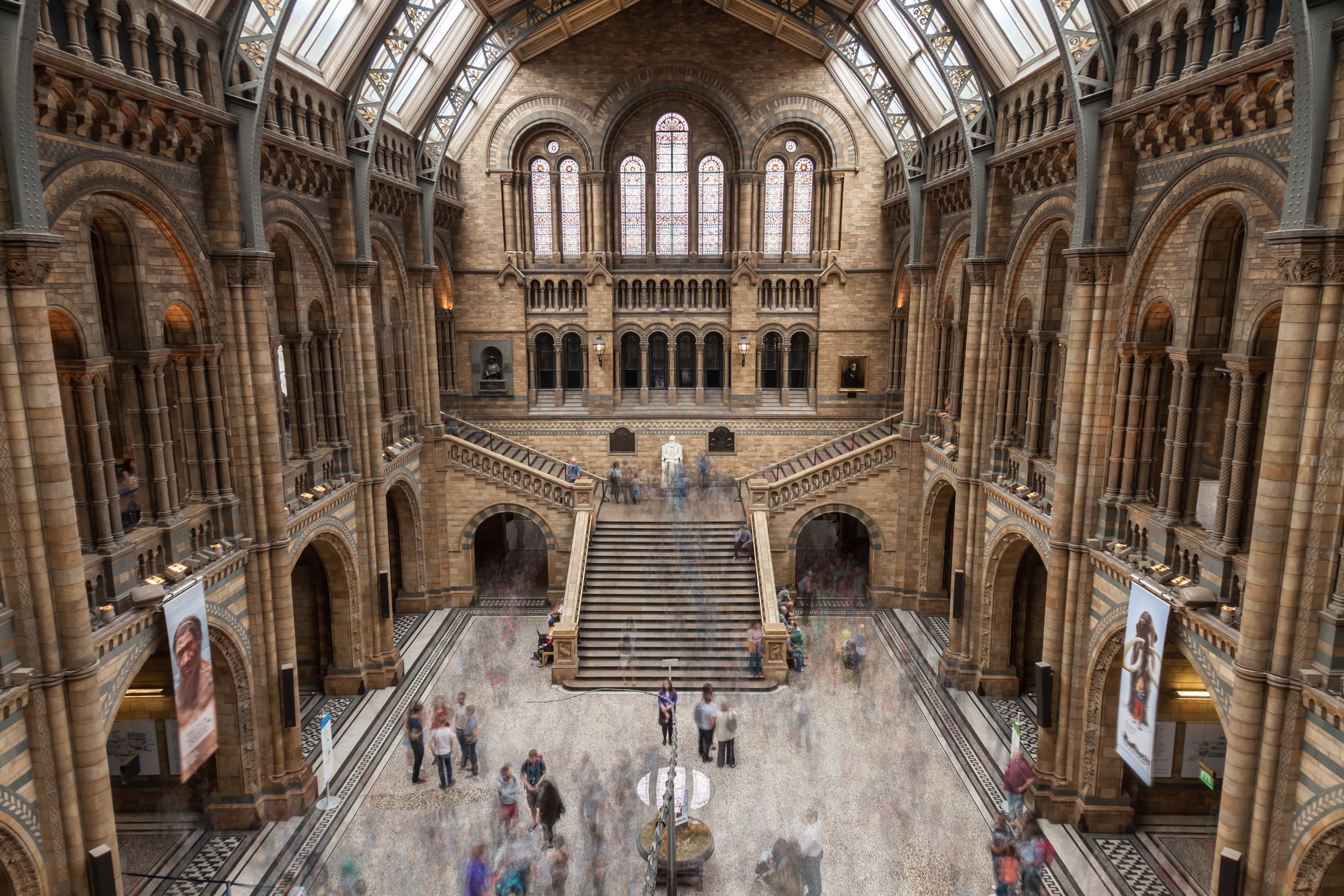
The Natural History Museum, London

== Soundtrack ==
Nick Urata composed the film's soundtrack. Gwen Stefani and Pharrell Williams were commissioned to write a song for the film's American release, which turned into "Shine".

== Release ==
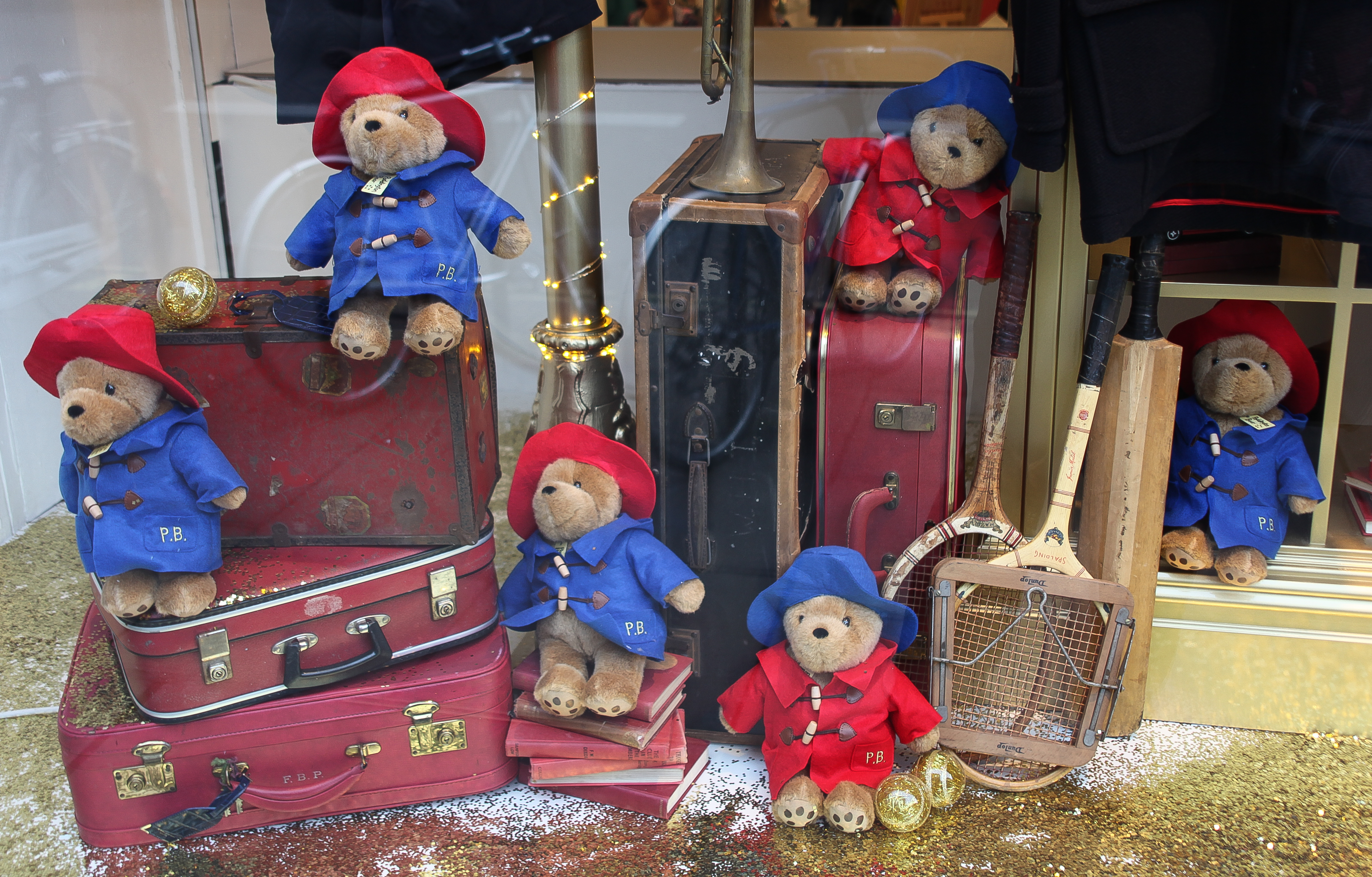
Christmas shopwindow at Selfridges department store in London with a Paddington Bear theme to mark the release of the film, 27 November 2014

=== Video game ===
A video game based on the film, titled Paddington: Adventures in London, was released on 11 August 2015 for Nintendo 3DS and is published by Anuman Interactive through their Kids' Mania label.

=== Home media ===
Paddington was released on Blu-ray and DVD in the United Kingdom on 23 March 2015 by StudioCanal and then released on 28 April 2015 in the United States.

In Germany, the film was released on the 4K Ultra HD Blu-ray format on 13 February 2025. In the United Kingdom, Paddington was released on 4K Ultra HD Blu-ray on 17 February 2025 as part of a collection featuring all three films in the series. A standalone edition followed on 26 May 2025.

== Reception ==
=== Classification ===
In November 2014, the British Board of Film Classification (BBFC) gave the film a PG certificate for its UK release and advised parents that the film contained "dangerous behaviour, mild threat, mild sex references [and] mild bad language." Paul King, the film's director, told BBC reporter Tim Muffett: "I'm not surprised about that [the PG certificate] but I don't think it's a PG for sexiness. That I would find very odd." Paddington's creator, Michael Bond, said he was "totally amazed" at the BBFC's advice. After the film's distributor challenged the certification, the BBFC revised the wording of its parental guidance, replacing "mild sex references" with "innuendo". It also further qualified the "mild bad language" as "infrequent", saying it referred to "a single mumbled use of 'bloody'."

=== Box office ===
Paddington was released on 28 November 2014 in the United Kingdom, where it took in $8 million (£5.1 million) on its opening weekend, and topped the box office for two weeks. It was StudioCanal's highest opening and the second-highest 2014 family film debut in the country behind The Lego Movie. For the week ending 9 December 2014 it topped the box office in France. For the week ending 24 December 2014 it topped the box office in Australia.

The film was released in the United States on 16 January 2015. The film opened to third place in its first weekend, earning $19.0 million, behind American Sniper and The Wedding Ringer, and closed with a total of $76.3 million.

The film ultimately grossed $326.1 million worldwide.

=== Critical response ===
On the review aggregator website Rotten Tomatoes, 96% of 166 critics' reviews are positive, with an average rating of 7.80/10. The website's consensus reads: "Paddington brings a beloved children's character into the 21st century without sacrificing his essential charm, delivering a family-friendly adventure as irresistibly cuddly as its star." Metacritic, which uses a weighted average, assigned the film a score of 77 out of 100, based on 38 critics, indicating "generally favorable" reviews. Audiences polled by CinemaScore gave the film a grade of "A" on an A+ to F scale.

Upon its UK release, Peter Bradshaw of The Guardian gave the film four out of five stars, saying: "the new CGI-live-action Paddington Bear could easily have been another garish, cheapo Brit-movie. Instead, writer-director Paul King ... and co-writer Hamish McColl have created a charming and sweet-natured family film, full of wit and fun, skewed towards young children but cheekily speckled with sly gags pitched at the older audience." Geoffrey Macnab of The Independent called it a "film of considerable charm but one undermined by a very bitty and flimsy screenplay. Writer-director Paul King has more flair for comic set-pieces than he does for sustained narrative."

IndieWire said critics were "pleasantly surprised" and that the film was "hailed for its warm-heartedness and playful sense of humor ... and Whishaw's charming performance". Guy Lodge of Variety praised it for "honouring the everyday quirks of Bond's stories, while subtly updating their middle-class London milieu". Leslie Felperin of The Hollywood Reporter gave the film a positive review, saying: "It's a relief to report that the final film is actually quite charming, thoughtful and as cuddly as a plush toy, albeit one with a few modern gizmos thrown in." Ignatiy Vishnevetsky of The A.V. Club gave the film a B, saying: "If the film seems head-and-shoulders above the average effects-driven family-matinee flick, it's because it never gives the impression that it's trying to be anything more (or less) than good-natured and fun to watch." Jason Clark of Entertainment Weekly gave the film an A−, saying: "A gloriously whimsical big-screen debut that's closer to the madcap spirit of the Muppets and the lovingly rendered style of a Wes Anderson film than to standard multiplex family fodder." Claudia Puig of USA Today gave the film three out of four stars, saying: "Paddington's journey from South America to London is just droll enough for adults – qualifying as a gentle parable about xenophobia – and exuberant enough for the youngest viewers." Moira MacDonald of The Seattle Times gave the film three out of five stars, saying: "Paddington is, ultimately, about how a newcomer can become part of a family, and about how good manners and marmalade can get you out of any tricky situation – delightful messages, at any age." Bruce Demara of the Toronto Star gave the film three out of four stars, saying: "It's a relief to say that – as films based on fictional animals go – Paddington is better than merely bearable."

Barbara VanDenburgh of The Arizona Republic gave the film three and a half stars out of five, saying: "Paddington is a mostly smart update loaded with charm, and it preserves enough of the fuzzy feelings for purists to walk away with a smile." Peter Travers of Rolling Stone gave the film four out of five stars, saying: "An irresistible charmbomb. The in-jokes are verbal and visual, managing to reference themes as diverse as immigration and insider trading. It's all very droll and quietly, memorably dazzling." Sandie Angulo Chen of The Washington Post gave the film three out of four stars, saying: "Because of its adorable protagonist, laugh-out-loud gags and touching premise, Paddington succeeds in a way most CGI/live-action hybrids do not." Betsy Sharkey of the Los Angeles Times gave the film a positive review, saying: "Artfully and cleverly, the sweet spirit of that young bear from darkest Peru and his many London misadventures materializes brilliantly on screen in the very good hands of writer-director-conjurer Paul King."

Mary Houlihan of the Chicago Sun-Times gave the film three and a half stars out of four, saying: "This is a charming film whose underlying message of tolerance and acceptance strikes a palpable chord in today's world – both for children and adults." Jocelyn Noveck of the Associated Press gave the film a positive review, saying: "For parents looking for a film that'll please them and their kids in equal measure, Paddington is—as Goldilocks would say in that other bear story—just right." Tom Long of The Detroit News gave the film a B+, saying: "Paddington is an absolute delight, visually inventive, thoroughly goofy and goosed by a mix of dry British wit and pratfall shenanigans."

Two years after the film's release, in 2016, Empire magazine ranked Paddington 81st on their list of the 100 best British films, with their entry stating, "A great big hug of a movie, Paddington charmed the public and critics alike in one of the nicest surprises of 2014, adding itself to the canon of beloved Christmas movies."

Paddington creator Michael Bond responded positively to the adaptation, describing the completed film as "a delight from start to finish".

=== Accolades ===
Event	Category	Recipient(s)	Result
68th British Academy Film Awards	Alexander Korda Award for Best British Film	David Heyman and Paul King	Nominated
68th British Academy Film Awards	Best Adapted Screenplay	Paul King	Nominated
20th Empire Awards	Best British Film	David Heyman and Paul King	Nominated
20th Empire Awards	Best Comedy Film	David Heyman and Paul King	Won
41st Saturn Awards	Best Fantasy Film	David Heyman and Paul King	Nominated
2015 South Bank Sky Arts Award	Best Film	David Heyman and Paul King	Nominated
British Academy Children's Awards	BAFTA Kids' Vote - Feature Film	Paddington	Nominated
British Academy Children's Awards	Feature Film	David Heyman and Paul King	Won
Movieguide Awards	Best Movie for Families	Paddington	Nominated

== Franchise ==
=== Sequels ===
A sequel to the film was released on 10 November 2017 in the United Kingdom. David Heyman returned to produce. Paul King returned to direct and co-wrote the sequel with Simon Farnaby. A second sequel titled Paddington in Peru, was released on 8 November 2024 in the United Kingdom, with Dougal Wilson taking over as director.

=== Television series ===
On 9 October 2017, it was announced that StudioCanal were producing an animated television series called The Adventures of Paddington. The series launched worldwide on Nickelodeon in 2020, with Whishaw reprising his voice of Paddington.

== Legacy ==
The success of Paddington contributed to a revival of the character's international popularity. In a 2024 retrospective, Time Out noted that Paddington's screen presence had diminished prior to the film series, but that the films substantially increased interest in the character. StudioCanal executive Françoise Guyonnet said that, although Paddington had already been well known in the United Kingdom, the company's challenge had been to introduce him to a wider international audience.

The film also formed the basis for Paddington: The Musical, which opened in London's West End in 2025. The stage production, based on Michael Bond's characters with a story inspired by the 2014 film, won seven Laurence Olivier Awards in 2026, including Best New Musical.

== See also ==
- London in film
