= Dungeon synth =

Electronic music genre

- Stylistic origins: Dark ambient; black metal
- Cultural origins: Early 1990s, Norway
- Typical instruments: Synthesizer; keyboard; DAW; MIDI

Subgenres
- Dino synth; Crypt Hop; Keller Synth

Other topics
- Berlin School; darkwave; neofolk; drone; neoclassical dark wave

Dungeon synth is a genre of electronic music derived from black metal and dark ambient. The style emerged in the early 1990s, predominantly among members of the early Norwegian black metal scene. Dungeon synth usually evokes medieval European or fantasy themes.

== Characteristics ==
The genre employs aesthetics and themes typically associated with black metal juxtaposed to the typical heavy tremolo-picking, blast-beats, and harsh, shrieked vocals of black metal by way of compositions of instrumental or ambient music commonly used as introductions, interludes, or outros in black metal, death metal, and heavy metal albums throughout the 1980s and 1990s. Though often paired with European medieval and fantasy motifs throughout the 1990s onward, some prominent contemporaries of dungeon synth reject the excessive prevalence of high-fantasy themes. Dungeon synth is contentiously likened to video game music because of fantasy influences, the usage and layering of synths, and a focus on ambience. Although traditional acts such as Mortiis have rejected the influence of video game soundtracks on dungeon synth, more recent dungeon synth acts take heavy influence from video games, especially RPGs.

== History ==
=== Precursors ===
Dungeon synth is derived from black metal and dark ambient. Prior to the development of dungeon synth, the influence of instrumental electronic music had made its way into the early Norwegian black metal scene, with Tangerine Dream and Klaus Schulze influencing Mayhem, Emperor, and Enslaved. Mayhem's debut EP Deathcrush (1987) opened with the Conrad Schnitzler composition "Silvester Anfang".

=== Origins ===
The progenitors of dungeon synth are Mortiis and Burzum, who both originated from the early Norwegian black metal scene: Mortiis being formed by Håvard Ellefsen, the bassist of Emperor; and Burzum originating as a black metal solo project by Varg Vikernes of Old Funeral and Mayhem. While starting Mortiis, Ellefsen embraced the influence of Tangerine Dream, Klaus Schulze, Skinny Puppy, and Enigma. Mortiis' first demo, clocking in at just under an hour in length, marked the first time a musician made use of black metal aesthetics on a release that contained entirely instrumental and non-traditional black-metal instrumentation. The second iteration of this demo tape would be the first time Ellefsen would use the phrase "dark dungeon music" to refer to its style. Mortiis went on to be a major performer of this genre and the style is heavily prevalent in early releases such as Født til å Herske and later releases from the return to the "Era I" sound, chiefly Spirit of Rebellion. Other prominent contemporaries of the genre include Old Tower, Sombre Arcane, Thangorodrim, and Depressive Silence.

Vikernes cited Das Ich, Dead Can Dance, and Pyotr Ilyich Tchaikovsky among influences on Burzum's ambient aspect. Finnish dungeon synth musician Tuomas M. Mäkelä of Jääportit has cited Dead Can Dance and Arcana among his influences. Robert Nusslein (founding member of Ritual) of Casket of Dreams has listed Tangerine Dream, Velvet Acid Christ, Dead Can Dance, and Death in June among his influences.

In 1993, Danish one-man synth project the Dark Funeral released a demo, which is occasionally invoked alongside Mortiis' earliest works as another example of nascent dungeon synth, but the project quickly ended after releasing two demos. That same year, Jim Kirkwood published two works that would retroactively be touted as influencing early dungeon synth music: Through A Dark Glass and Tower of Darkness. 1994 saw the publication Pazuzu's ...And All Was Silent, which is now a part of the dungeon synth canon. (Note: the self-released The Soil Bleeds Black demo tape,)

== Offshoots and subgenres ==
=== Dino synth ===
Dino synth is a niche offshoot of dungeon synth that is inspired by dinosaurs and prehistoric life. It is considered one of the strangest subgenres in contemporary music as a result of the inability for people to pinpoint when it started. The album Slow and Heavy by Diplodocus (an alias used by American musician and Dungeons Deep Records founder Andrew Fritts) is considered the first dino synth record.

=== Crypt hop ===
Crypt hop, also known as dungeon rap, is an obscure underground music genre that blends dungeon synth with lo-fi hip-hop beats. Often featuring dark, dungeon-like atmospheres with experimental hip-hop or instrumental tracks, it is considered a niche subgenre, with tracks shared on Bandcamp. Many artists, such as DJ Sacred, blend the dark themes and punchy drums featured in Memphis horrorcore with dungeon synth's characteristic soundscapes to create a woozy, evil-sounding atmosphere in their music.

=== Tänzelcore/Keller Synth ===
Tänzelcore, also known as Keller Synth, is a combination of electronic dance music and the aesthetics of extreme metal. The style is characterized by high-tempo beats, gabber kicks, and hardcore techno structures layered with crude, lo-fi synthesizer melodies that evoke medieval fantasy soundtracks. The name is derived from the German tänzeln, meaning "to prance." The genre is known for its absurdist medieval aesthetic and was created in Saarland by artist Justin "Sigfrid" Reiter, with the album Moselfrankian Tänzelcore Madness, on the project Bergënot. Artist TopfHelm described the genre's atmosphere as "witches gathering in a dark forest at night to perform strange rituals" in an interview.
