= The Night Market =

- What We Do in the Shadows episode
- Episode no.: Season 4 Episode 4
- Directed by: Yana Gorskaya
- Written by: William Meny; Paul Simms
- Cinematography by: DJ Stipsen
- Editing by: Yana Gorskaya; Dane McMaster
- Production code: XWS04004
- Original air date: July 26, 2022
- Running time: 26 minutes

Guest appearances
- Kristen Schaal as The Guide; Anoop Desai as The Djinn; Parisa Fakhri as Marwa

Episode chronology
← Previous "The Grand Opening"	Next → "Private School"

"The Night Market" is the fourth episode of the fourth season of the American mockumentary comedy horror television series What We Do in the Shadows, set in the franchise of the same name. It is the 34th overall episode of the series and was written by co-producer William Meny and executive producer Paul Simms, and directed by co-executive producer Yana Gorskaya. It was released on FX on July 26, 2022.

The series is set in Staten Island, New York City. Like the 2014 film, the series follows the lives of vampires in the city. These consist of three vampires, Nandor, Laszlo, and Nadja. They live alongside Colin Robinson, an energy vampire; and Guillermo, Nandor's familiar. The series explores the absurdity and misfortunes experienced by the vampires. In the episode, the vampires visit the night market for different purposes.

According to Nielsen Media Research, the episode was seen by an estimated 0.339 million household viewers and gained a 0.11 ratings share among adults aged 18–49. The episode received positive reviews from critics, who praised the humor and the fight between Guillermo and Nandor, although the rest of the storylines and pacing received criticism.

== Plot ==
With Baby Colin (Mark Proksch) performing, business at the nightclub has been going well. Nevertheless, Nadja (Natasia Demetriou) is concerned about accidental deaths caused by the wraiths, with the Guide (Kristen Schaal) feeling that they do it on purpose due to bad working conditions. The wraiths have formed a union and their leader, Xerxes, lets their demands well known but Nadja rebuffs them.

Per Nadja's suggestion, the vampires visit a night market, which can be accessed through a subway train, and is a secret marketplace used by many types of supernatural creatures. Laszlo (Matt Berry) decides to introduce Baby Colin to many of the creatures, including fairies. Nandor (Kayvan Novak) introduces Guillermo (Harvey Guillén) to the "familiar fight", in which the vampires bring their familiars to fight to death. When Guillermo is revealed as a familiar, the ringmaster asks him to step in and fight, which Nandor allows as he is getting booed for not doing it. Guillermo easily fends off other familiars and is awarded by "what humans want the most": dried-up dog food. Nevertheless, he is booed by the crowd for not fighting nor hurting the familiars.

Guillermo is then put to fight the champion vampire, Gorgo the Murderer. As Guillermo cannot fight him as it will expose his ancestry, Nandor takes Gorgo's place to fight Guillermo. Their fight extends into many corners of the stage, with some creatures dying in the process. When Guillermo has the chance to stake him, he tells Nandor that they can escape by faking his death. For this, Nandor feigns snapping Guillermo's neck, allowing them to escape the arena. Nadja returns to the nightclub, where she exposes Xerxes to water lily of the Nile, a narcotic for wraiths. She tries to get Xerxes on her side and abandon his demands, which he accepts in exchange for the narcotic. When the other wraiths find out, they kill Xerxes for his actions. Nadja reluctantly agrees to their terms, and the wraiths return to work. Back home, Baby Colin asks Laszlo to read him a "real stuff" book instead of fairytales. Laszlo then reads him In Cold Blood to sleep.

== Production ==
=== Development ===
In June 2022, FX confirmed that the fourth episode of the season would be titled "The Night Market", and that it would be written by co-producer William Meny and executive producer Paul Simms, and directed by co-executive producer Yana Gorskaya. This was Meny's third writing credit, Simms' ninth writing credit, and Gorskaya's 11th directing credit.

== Reception ==
=== Viewers ===
In its original American broadcast, "The Night Market" was seen by an estimated 0.339 million household viewers with a 0.11 in the 18-49 demographics. This means that 0.11 percent of all households with televisions watched the episode. This was a 44% increase in viewership from the previous episode, which was watched by 0.234 million household viewers with a 0.15 in the 18-49 demographics.

=== Critical reviews ===
"The Night Market" received positive reviews from critics. William Hughes of The A.V. Club gave the episode a "B" grade and wrote, "It's not that tonight's installment of WWDITS, 'The Night Market,' is a laugh-free endeavor. No episode of TV that features Natasia Demetriou gleefully tchotchke hunting in a mystical marketplace full of shit-stinking fairies is going to be devoid of a few, possibly improvised, gems. But it does take a long, largely meandering road to get to its central set piece: a battle between Guillermo and Nandor that's roughly one part showmanship for a crowd of baying vampires and two parts a resolution to those ego-bruising 'Who would win in a fight?' questions that got raised in last season's finale."

Katie Rife of Vulture gave the episode a 4 star rating out of 5 and wrote, "A lot is going on in 'The Night Market,' so much so that we're just getting around to the market itself. This week's episode is especially heavy on prosthetic makeup and little rubbery magic guys, like the shoeshine imp and Laszlo's trash-talking, poo-gobbling fairy friends. The market itself struck me as a combination of a number of movies I've seen featuring fantastical cities. But my favorite part of the whole thing was probably the subway car that they take to get to their destination, guarded by a subway performer too stinky for weak human constitutions." Tony Sokol of Den of Geek gave the episode a 4 star rating out of 5 and wrote, "As Nadja summarizes, 'The Night Market' kind of goes on forever, and it has dark, dirty asides, a bit like her. It is a bargain at any price. What We Do in the Shadows does well to change up the scenarios and creatures, adding to its arsenal of ghoulish guests. Most shows with a monster-of-the-week only include one monster, so mixing it up makes it a party."

Melody McCune of Telltale TV gave the episode a 4.5 star rating out of 5 and wrote, "Overall, 'The Night Market' kicks the action, immersive scale, and hilarity up a notch, with pitch-perfect performances and Nandermo aplenty. Plus, Nadja's expert haggling skills are worthy of our praise. Maybe if we all ask the Djinn nicely, our train stop will take us to the Night Market." Alejandra Bodden of Bleeding Cool gave the episode a 9 out of 10 rating and wrote, "This week's episode of FX's What We Do in the Shadows, S04E04 'The Night Market,' was a perfect way to showcase, once again, that our favorite vampires do actually care about one another. Honestly? It was another great outing to add to the growing list of excellence for this show."
