= The Portrait (What We Do in the Shadows) =

- What We Do in the Shadows episode
- Episode no.: Season 3 Episode 10
- Directed by: Yana Gorskaya
- Written by: Sam Johnson; Stefani Robinson; Paul Simms; Lauren Wells
- Cinematography by: DJ Stipsen
- Editing by: Yana Gorskaya; Dane McMaster
- Production code: XWS03010
- Original air date: October 28, 2021
- Running time: 28 minutes

Guest appearances
- Donal Logue as Himself; Taika Waititi as Viago von Dorna Schmarten Scheden Heimburg; Doug Jones as Baron Afanas; Kristen Schaal as The Guide

Episode chronology
← Previous "A Farewell"	Next → "Reunited"

"The Portrait" is the tenth episode and season finale of the third season of the American mockumentary comedy horror television series What We Do in the Shadows, set in the franchise of the same name. It is the 30th overall episode of the series and was written by co-executive producer Sam Johnson, executive producer Stefani Robinson, executive producer Paul Simms, and Lauren Wells, and directed by co-executive producer Yana Gorskaya. It was released on FX on October 28, 2021.

The series is set in Staten Island, New York City. Like the 2014 film, the series follows the lives of vampires in the city. These consist of three vampires, Nandor, Laszlo, and Nadja. They live alongside Colin Robinson, an energy vampire; and Guillermo, Nandor's familiar. The series explores the absurdity and misfortunes experienced by the vampires. In the episode, the vampires decide to follow different paths after Colin Robinson's death.

According to Nielsen Media Research, the episode was seen by an estimated 0.375 million household viewers and gained a 0.15 ratings share among adults aged 18–49. The episode received critical acclaim, with critics praising the performances, tone, character development and new status quo.

== Plot ==
To mourn Colin Robinson (Mark Proksch), the vampires decide to take a portrait of themselves with Guillermo (Harvey Guillén), the Guide (Kristen Schaal), Nadja's ghost, Baron Afanas (Doug Jones), the Sire and Guillermo's hellhound.

Nandor (Kayvan Novak) informs Guillermo that he will leave Staten Island, feeling that the recent events through the past weeks made him wish for a new start. Guillermo also discovers that Nadja (Natasia Demetriou) was invited by Viago (Taika Waititi) to join the Supreme Vampiric Council. However, she would have to move to London, and Laszlo (Matt Berry) has made it clear he will never return to England after being expelled from a prestigious high-society group known as the Sherwood Club. When she confronts him about not supporting her, Laszlo states that he was expelled for marrying Nadja despite her low class status. Upon learning of her offer, Laszlo decides to let his hatred aside and accompany her.

Guillermo does not take well any of the news, especially as he was never turned into a vampire for all his years of service. When Nandor confronts him, Guillermo lets his frustration known when he claims Nandor is only alive because he lets him. This prompts a fight, in which Guillermo gains the upper hand. Nandor then claims that it was a test, and offers him the chance of accompanying him in his journey through the world, which he accepts. Guillermo helps Nadja and Laszlo at the harbor, getting Nadja in her coffin. As he prepares Laszlo's coffin, Laszlo suddenly pushes him into the coffin, telling him to look after his wife and writing a letter to Nadja explaining his decision. When Guillermo fails to show up at a station in New Jersey, Nandor leaves on the train. It is revealed that earlier that day, Laszlo checked on Colin Robinson's body, discovering something emerged from his body. Following the trail, he discovers a baby boy resembling Colin Robinson. This prompts him to stay in Staten Island to care for the baby in the house.

== Production ==
=== Development ===
In September 2021, FX confirmed that the tenth episode of the season would be titled "The Portrait", and that it would be written by co-executive producer Sam Johnson, executive producer Stefani Robinson, executive producer Paul Simms, and Lauren Wells, and directed by co-executive producer Yana Gorskaya. This was Johnson's fifth writing credit, Robinson's seventh writing credit, Simms' seventh writing credit, Wells' first writing credit, and Gorskaya's eighth directing credit.

=== Writing ===
Regarding the departure of the characters, Paul Simms explained, "The first two seasons, we just ended on a big exciting thing, not knowing how we were going to get ourselves out of it — first revealing that Guillermo was a vampire hunter, then with Guillermo saving the vampires from being murdered. This time, Baby Colin just gave us an idea of where the next season would go. But as far as scattering everyone to the four winds, we were like, 'Let's just do it, and we'll figure it out later.'"

== Reception ==
=== Viewers ===
In its original American broadcast, "The Portrait" was seen by an estimated 0.375 million household viewers with a 0.15 in the 18-49 demographics. This means that 0.15 percent of all households with televisions watched the episode. This was a 37% increase in viewership from the previous episode, which was watched by 0.272 million household viewers with a 0.09 in the 18-49 demographics.

=== Critical reviews ===
"The Portrait" received critical acclaim. Katie Rife of The A.V. Club gave the episode an "A–" grade and wrote, "Up until the last few minutes of 'The Portrait,' the season-three finale of What We Do In The Shadows felt like a series finale. With Colin Robinson permanently out of the picture, the vampires, showing the emotional maturity and clear-eyed view of life and death that come from centuries of immortality, have decided to... pretend he never existed. And as people (or former people) trying to avoid feeling their feelings sometimes do, they start throwing themselves into plans that don't involve confronting the loss of the boring, stinky housemate who nevertheless grew on them over the years."

Tony Sokol of Den of Geek gave the episode a perfect 5 star rating out of 5 and wrote, "As an episode, 'The Portrait' is a work of art. It may be the best season finale of What We Do in the Shadows. It provides cliffhanger after cliffhanger, twists, turns, and amazing character development. It promises suspense and adventure for the season to come. It is also a fun episode."

Melody McCune of Telltale TV gave the episode a 4.5 star rating out of 5 and wrote, "Overall, 'The Portrait' is What We Do in the Shadows' most extensive, boldly daring outing yet, pushing the boundaries of where these characters can go and leaving significant cliffhangers over which the audience will painstakingly ponder for the following year." Alejandra Bodden of Bleeding Cool gave the episode a 9.5 out of 10 rating and wrote, "The season finale of FX's What We Do in the Shadows is finally upon us with the stellar episode 'The Portrait' ending yet another impressive run. Season 3 definitely threw us for a loop, and there was not a single slow episode or moment throughout."
