= The Grand Opening (What We Do in the Shadows) =

- What We Do in the Shadows episode
- Episode no.: Season 4 Episode 3
- Directed by: Kyle Newacheck
- Written by: Sam Johnson and Chris Marcil
- Cinematography by: Michael Storey
- Editing by: Liza Cardinale; Yana Gorskaya
- Production code: XWS04003
- Original air date: July 19, 2022
- Running time: 24 minutes

Guest appearances
- Fred Armisen as Doctor Tom; Affion Crockett as Richie Suck; Kristen Schaal as The Guide; Anoop Desai as The Djinn; Parisa Fakhri as Marwa

Episode chronology
← Previous "The Lamp"	Next → "The Night Market"

"The Grand Opening" is the third episode of the fourth season of the American mockumentary comedy horror television series What We Do in the Shadows, set in the franchise of the same name. It is the 33rd overall episode of the series and was written by Sam Johnson and Chris Marcil, and directed by co-executive producer Kyle Newacheck. It was released on FX on July 19, 2022.

The series is set in Staten Island, New York City. Like the 2014 film, the series follows the lives of vampires in the city. These consist of three vampires, Nandor, Laszlo, and Nadja. They live alongside Colin Robinson, an energy vampire; and Guillermo, Nandor's familiar. The series explores the absurdity and misfortunes experienced by the vampires. In the episode, Nadja experiences problems with the opening act of the nightclub.

According to Nielsen Media Research, the episode was seen by an estimated 0.234 million household viewers and gained a 0.07 ratings share among adults aged 18–49. The episode received extremely positive reviews from critics, who praised the humor, performances and absurdity.

== Plot ==
Nadja (Natasia Demetriou) welcomes new vampires to the grand opening of her nightclub, Nadja's. One of the attendees is vampire rapper Richie Suck (Affion Crockett), who hasn't released an album in a decade but will perform on the opening night. However, the Guide (Kristen Schaal) informs her that Richie has cancelled his performance.

Nadja and the Guide visit Richie at his house, where they are taken aback by his manager, Richie's human familiar "Doctor" Tom (Fred Armisen). Tom does not want Richie to perform, forcing Nadja to give him a larger sum of money for the services. However, per Tom's insistence, Richie will only plays jazz music. Meanwhile, Baby Colin (Mark Proksch) has quickly grown into a kid, now spending time making YouTube videos about Legos. He takes a particular interest in musical theatre, which annoys Laszlo (Matt Berry) as he hates it. He tries to get him interested in stealing art, but eventually discovers that he cannot force him in changing his interests.

Wanting to impress Marwa (Parisa Fakhri), Nandor (Kayvan Novak) decides to ask the djinn (Anoop Desai) to get the world's largest penis. However, Guillermo (Harvey Guillén) advises him to properly detail the wish, as the djinn may distort his wish in some way. They manage to come up with a specific wish, which is granted to Nandor. Nevertheless, Nandor discovers that the djinn tricked him into saying that he would always think of Guillermo when using it. At the nightclub, Richie prepares to perform his jazz number, but after talking with Nadja, decides to oppose Tom. He throws him into a crowd of vampires, who feed off him. However, Richie reveals that he now will just perform improvisational comedy, angering the crowd. Baby Colin then goes on stage and sings "Rap, Tap on Wood" from Born to Dance, which entertains the vampires due to their admiration for child novelty acts.

== Production ==
=== Development ===
In June 2022, FX confirmed that the third episode of the season would be titled "The Grand Opening", and that it would be written by Sam Johnson and Chris Marcil, and directed by co-executive producer Kyle Newacheck. This was Johnson's sixth writing credit, Marcil's third writing credit, and Newacheck's ninth directing credit.

== Reception ==
=== Viewers ===
In its original American broadcast, "The Grand Opening" was seen by an estimated 0.234 million household viewers with a 0.07 in the 18-49 demographics. This means that 0.07 percent of all households with televisions watched the episode. This was a 40% decrease in viewership from the previous episode, which was watched by 0.385 million household viewers with a 0.15 in the 18-49 demographics.

=== Critical reviews ===
"The Grand Opening" received extremely positive reviews from critics. William Hughes of The A.V. Club gave the episode a "B+" grade and wrote, "In many other shows, calling out a penis enlargement plotline as the best that an episode has to offer might be seen as damning said effort with faint praise. Here, though, it's just an acknowledgment of how much fun WWDITS is having by giving Nandor and Guillermo access to unlimited power, in the form of Anoop Desai's quietly sardonic djinn."

Katie Rife of Vulture gave the episode a 4 star rating out of 5 and wrote, "In my season-premiere recap, I noted that following their dreams without alienating their loved ones would be a challenge for the characters this season. And thus far, well, they've done a pretty shit job. But they're all too busy at the moment to let resentments fester — although we'll see what happens once the dust settles at Nadja's." Tony Sokol of Den of Geek gave the episode a 4.5 star rating out of 5 and wrote, "'The Grand Opening' is a headlining act. As Nadja says 'it's so disgusting, I love it.' What We Do in the Shadows weaponizes irony, and has earned the right to wear it like fangs."

Melody McCune of Telltale TV gave the episode a 4.5 star rating out of 5 and wrote, "The cast knocks it out of the park as usual, and the biting, bloodsucking dialogue is in a league of its own. There isn't another show on TV like What We Do in the Shadows, and it's unlikely that a series akin to it will follow on its heels." Alejandra Bodden of Bleeding Cool gave the episode a 9 out of 10 rating and wrote, "This week's episode of FX's What We Do in the Shadows was a fantastic segue after a wonderful start to the season, as if the wait for this season never happened."
