= The Wedding (What We Do in the Shadows) =

- What We Do in the Shadows episode
- Episode no.: Season 4 Episode 6
- Directed by: Tig Fong
- Written by: Sam Johnson; Sarah Naftalis; Marika Sawyer; Paul Simms
- Cinematography by: Michael Storey
- Editing by: Hannah Anaya; Liza Cardinale
- Production code: XWS04009
- Original air date: August 9, 2022
- Running time: 24 minutes

Guest appearances
- Doug Jones as Baron Afaras; Marissa Jaret Winokur as Charmaine Rinaldi; Anthony Atamanuik as Sean Rinaldi; Chris Sandiford as Derek; Kristen Schaal as The Guide; Anoop Desai as The Djinn; Parisa Fakhri as Marwa

Episode chronology
← Previous "Private School"	Next → "Pine Barrens"

"The Wedding" is the sixth episode of the fourth season of the American mockumentary comedy horror television series What We Do in the Shadows, set in the franchise of the same name. It is the 36th overall episode of the series and was written by executive producer Sam Johnson, producer Sarah Naftalis, co-executive producer Marika Sawyer, and executive producer Paul Simms, and directed by Tig Fong. It was released on FX on August 9, 2022.

The series is set in Staten Island, New York City. Like the 2014 film, the series follows the lives of vampires in the city. These consist of three vampires, Nandor, Laszlo, and Nadja. They live alongside Colin Robinson, an energy vampire; and Guillermo, Nandor's familiar. The series explores the absurdity and misfortunes experienced by the vampires. In the episode, Nandor's wedding approaches and he feels stressed out with the planning.

According to Nielsen Media Research, the episode was seen by an estimated 0.372 million household viewers and gained a 0.11 ratings share among adults aged 18–49. The episode received extremely positive reviews from critics, who praised the performances, character development and themes.

== Plot ==
Nandor (Kayvan Novak) starts feeling stressed out as his wedding with Marwa (Parisa Fakhri) is approaching. As he is the best man, Guillermo (Harvey Guillén) hasn't slept in a week due to the arrangements, including having to listen to Nandor claim that there might be a conspiracy against him.

Seeing that Guillermo is stressed out due to Nandor's changing plans, Nadja (Natasia Demetriou) and the Guide (Kristen Schaal) offer to help. They visit the Baron (Doug Jones) and the Sire at their house in Nutley, New Jersey, as Nandor wants the Baron to officiate the wedding. The Baron feels unable to do it for his condition, so they go shopping to buy him clothing to hide his look. Without luck, they finally confront Nandor for his demands, telling him he should use the djinn (Anoop Desai) to make things easier for Guillermo. Nandor reluctantly agrees; he makes the Baron return to his normal state, gets a living dodo to roast for the wraiths, and having Marwa likes all the things he likes. When he tries to make more wishes, the djinn states he finished with all his possible wishes. Guillermo goes to a convenience store, where he runs into Derek (Chris Sandiford), who now works as a clerk. He decides to invite him to the wedding.

As the Baron starts officiating the ceremony, Marwa's resurrected mother objects to the wedding, feeling her undead state should not warrant a new marriage. More people soon start objecting, which lasts over one hour. Suddenly, Marwa proclaims that she also had her doubts over marrying Nandor and even considered calling it off, but decided to go with it as this is what Nandor wants. Nandor and Marwa are officially remarried. At the reception, Nandor receives a present from the djinn, a small lamp that will grant him three more wishes. Nandor finds Baby Colin (Mark Proksch) drawing a penis on a sleeping Guillermo in a couch. He decides to put a jacket over him to cover the drawing.

== Production ==
=== Development ===
In July 2022, FX confirmed that the sixth episode of the season would be titled "The Wedding", and that it would be written by executive producer Sam Johnson, producer Sarah Naftalis, co-executive producer Marika Sawyer, and executive producer Paul Simms, and directed by Tig Fong. This was Johnson's seventh writing credit, Naftalis' third writing credit, Sawyer's fifth writing credit, Simms' tenth writing credit, and Fong's second directing credit.

== Reception ==
=== Viewers ===
In its original American broadcast, "The Wedding" was seen by an estimated 0.372 million household viewers with a 0.12 in the 18-49 demographics. This means that 0.12 percent of all households with televisions watched the episode. This was a slight decrease in viewership from the previous episode, which was watched by 0.391 million household viewers with a 0.12 in the 18-49 demographics.

=== Critical reviews ===
"The Wedding" received extremely positive reviews from critics. William Hughes of The A.V. Club gave the episode a "B+" grade and wrote, "Said nuptials are, of course, the subject of 'The Wedding,' tonight's installment of What We Do In The Shadows, which is paradoxically both a very focused and a very loose episode of TV. Despite Nandor's repeated assertions that there's a conspiracy in the works to derail his wedding, it turns out there's barely any plot involved here at all."

Katie Rife of Vulture gave the episode a perfect 5 star rating out of 5 and wrote, "Laszlo's relative absence this week allowed Doug Jones to snatch the line-reading crown this week with his silly Dracula accent, lamenting the state of his 'tattered wessel' and how 'once, they dined on the lavish feast that was my veesage.'" Tony Sokol of Den of Geek gave the episode a perfect 5 star rating out of 5 and wrote, "'The Wedding' fulfills its sitcom obligations, a bucket list waiting to be kicked over by the series. What We Do in the Shadows continues to showcase the troupe's unique repartee, with biting parody, ridiculous idiosyncrasies, and ironic-to-moronic indulgences which are becoming iconic."

Melody McCune of Telltale TV gave the episode a 4 star rating out of 5 and wrote, "'The Wedding' follows hot on the heels of the show's inarguably strongest outing, so it's challenging to gauge it by that metric. However, it boasts witty moments, top-tier performances from Kayvan Novak and Harvey Guillén, and an aura that feels akin to a warm hug from a bunch of sexy vampires." Alejandra Bodden of Bleeding Cool gave the episode an 8.5 out of 10 rating and wrote, "A vampire wedding is soon approaching, and this week's episode of FX's What We Do in the Shadows, 'The Wedding', went bridezilla on us. Yet again, another fantastic episode from the show's 'Vault of Awesomeness' this show has built so far."
