= The Lamp (What We Do in the Shadows) =

- What We Do in the Shadows episode
- Episode no.: Season 4 Episode 2
- Directed by: Yana Gorskaya
- Written by: Wally Baram; Aasia LaShay Bullock
- Cinematography by: Michael Storey
- Editing by: Yana Gorskaya; Dane McMaster
- Production code: XWS04002
- Original air date: July 12, 2022
- Running time: 27 minutes

Guest appearances
- Kristen Schaal as The Guide; Anoop Desai as The Djinn; Parisa Fakhri as Marwa

Episode chronology
← Previous "Reunited"	Next → "The Grand Opening"

"The Lamp" is the second episode of the fourth season of the American mockumentary comedy horror television series What We Do in the Shadows, set in the franchise of the same name. It is the 32nd overall episode of the series and was written by Wally Baram and Aasia LaShay Bullock, and directed by co-executive producer Yana Gorskaya. It was released on FX on July 12, 2022, airing back-to-back with the previous episode, "Reunited".

The series is set in Staten Island, New York City. Like the 2014 film, the series follows the lives of vampires in the city. These consist of three vampires, Nandor, Laszlo, and Nadja. They live alongside Colin Robinson, an energy vampire; and Guillermo, Nandor's familiar. The series explores the absurdity and misfortunes experienced by the vampires. In the episode, Nandor finds a djinn and decides to resurrect his 37 wives to decide which one to marry again. Meanwhile, Laszlo and Nadja try to get the Guide to approve the vampire nightclub.

According to Nielsen Media Research, the episode was seen by an estimated 0.385 million household viewers and gained a 0.15 ratings share among adults aged 18–49. The episode received extremely positive reviews from critics, who praised the humor and character development, although the pacing received criticism.

== Plot ==
Laszlo (Matt Berry) and Nadja (Natasia Demetriou) start hiring crew workers to start building the nightclub. The Guide (Kristen Schaal) opposes the decision, so she has the wraiths undo all the progress the workers do. They then start conspiring by turning some of the wraiths against her, but this backfires as they are loyal to her.

Nandor (Kayvan Novak) reveals to the documentary crew that he has kept treasures from his village to make a room and impress women, feeling he hasn't had luck in finding his wife. While checking the items, Guillermo (Harvey Guillén) finds a lamp, which Nandor has not been able to rub the right way. When Guillermo suggests a specific approach, Nandor rubs it, releasing a djinn (Anoop Desai). The djinn will grant 52 wishes to Nandor. He decides to resurrect one of his 37 deceased wives, but is unable to remember her name and description (with some of his wives including men). He decides to resurrect them and make them speak English so he can understand. Nandor decides to spend time with each wife and then eventually pick one, with those rejected sent to the Djinn, who sends them back to death.

As a last resort, Laszlo decides to use psychology on the Guide to understand her motives. She reveals that her job is part of a punishment for her past, which includes having sex with Van Helsing. Realizing that she holds feelings for Guillermo, they set her up on a date with him, promising him the position of accountant at the nightclub. Guillermo convinces her in allowing them to open the nightclub, so she decides to start by destroying part of the headquarters. Back at the house, Nandor has settled for his wife, Marwa (Parisa Fakhri).

== Production ==
=== Development ===
In June 2022, FX confirmed that the second episode of the season would be titled "The Lamp", and that it would be written by Wally Baram and Aasia LaShay Bullock, and directed by co-executive producer Yana Gorskaya. This was Baram's first writing credit, Bullock's first writing credit, and Gorskaya's tenth directing credit.

== Reception ==
=== Viewers ===
In its original American broadcast, "Reunited" was seen by an estimated 0.385 million household viewers with a 0.15 in the 18-49 demographics. This means that 0.15 percent of all households with televisions watched the episode. This was a 30% decrease in viewership from the previous episode, which was watched by 0.504 million household viewers with a 0.18 in the 18-49 demographics.

=== Critical reviews ===
"The Lamp" received extremely positive reviews from critics. William Hughes of The A.V. Club gave the episode an "A–" grade and wrote, "Even if 'The Lamp' doesn't quite hit the highs of 'Reunited,' it's still a welcome return for our favorite Staten Island vamps."

Katie Rife of Vulture gave the episode a 4 star rating out of 5 and wrote, "In its earliest episodes, much of the comedy on What We Do in the Shadows came from the contrast between ancient vampires and the mundanity of modern life. [...] But as Shadows' internal mythology has grown more complex, it's shifted toward using these juxtapositions to reveal new sides of the vampires' personalities rather than as absurd jokes in themselves." Tony Sokol of Den of Geek gave the episode a 4 star rating out of 5 and wrote, "'The Lamp' fulfills comic wishes faster than a djinn can click them off his ledger."

Melody McCune of Telltale TV gave the episode a 4.5 star rating out of 5 and wrote, "'The Lamp' finally sheds light on Nandor's enigmatic 37 wives from his homeland of Al Quolindar, and we meet some of them. Even as we enter the fourth season, What We Do in the Shadows still finds new ways to expand its mythos, planting narrative seeds that blossom in this immersive world." Alejandra Bodden of Bleeding Cool gave the episode an 8.5 out of 10 rating and wrote, "Well, we are back together a year later and the home in Staten Island is falling apart... but the series itself continues to build upon some excellent foundations."
