= Reunited (What We Do in the Shadows) =

- What We Do in the Shadows episode
- Episode no.: Season 4 Episode 1
- Directed by: Yana Gorskaya
- Written by: Stefani Robinson; Paul Simms
- Cinematography by: DJ Stipsen
- Editing by: Yana Gorskaya; Dane McMaster
- Production code: XWS04001
- Original air date: July 12, 2022
- Running time: 23 minutes

Guest appearance
- Kristen Schaal as The Guide

Episode chronology
← Previous "The Portrait"	Next → "The Lamp"

"Reunited" is the first episode of the fourth season of the American mockumentary comedy horror television series What We Do in the Shadows, set in the franchise of the same name. It is the 31st overall episode of the series and was written by executive producer Stefani Robinson and executive producer Paul Simms, and directed by co-executive producer Yana Gorskaya. It was released on FX on July 12, 2022, airing back-to-back with the follow-up episode, "The Lamp".

The series is set in Staten Island, New York City. Like the 2014 film, the series follows the lives of vampires in the city. These consist of three vampires, Nandor, Laszlo, and Nadja. They live alongside Colin Robinson, an energy vampire; and Guillermo, Nandor's familiar. The series explores the absurdity and misfortunes experienced by the vampires. In the episode, the vampires return to the house, discovering what Laszlo was hiding.

According to Nielsen Media Research, the episode was seen by an estimated 0.504 million household viewers and gained a 0.18 ratings share among adults aged 18–49. The episode received extremely positive reviews from critics, who praised the humor, tone, performances and set-up.

== Plot ==
One year later, the documentary crew return to the vampire house. They encounter Laszlo (Matt Berry), who has been taking care of baby Colin Robinson (Mark Proksch), referring to him as "boy." The boy has grown in size, although Laszlo still cannot call him Colin Robinson as he does not really see him in the boy's face. Laszlo has been training the boy, in order to avoid him from becoming an energy vampire like Colin Robinson.

Laszlo is surprised when Nandor (Kayvan Novak) and Nadja (Natasia Demetriou) return. Nadja is angry at having abandoned her for their planned journey to England, while Nandor visited the country before going back to Al-Quolanudar. They find that due to Laszlo's recklessness, the house is falling apart due to a gas leak. When Laszlo mentions a noise coming from a crate, Nadja remembers that she sent Guillermo (Harvey Guillén) back in the crate, where he has been locked for one week. Guillermo is angry at his treatment, and considers leaving the vampires behind. However, Nandor asks him to be his best man at his upcoming wedding, despite not having found a bride yet, and Guillermo accepts it. Guillermo is also shocked at Laszlo's treatment of Baby Colin, prompting him to stay to ensure the boy's safety.

As Colin Robinson paid the bills, the house's services are falling. Unable to access Colin Robinson's account, Nadja comes up with the idea of opening a vampire nightclub to raise money, something that she has wanted to do for years. They inform the plans to the Guide (Kristen Schaal), also telling her they will open the nightclub at their Vampiric Council headquarters, much to her chagrin.

== Production ==
=== Development ===
In June 2022, FX confirmed that the first episode of the season would be titled "Reunited", and that it would be written by executive producer Stefani Robinson and executive producer Paul Simms, and directed by co-executive producer Yana Gorskaya. This was Robinson's eighth writing credit, Simms' eighth writing credit, and Gorskaya's ninth directing credit.

== Reception ==
=== Viewers ===
In its original American broadcast, "Reunited" was seen by an estimated 0.504 million household viewers with a 0.18 in the 18-49 demographics. This means that 0.18 percent of all households with televisions watched the episode. This was a 34% increase in viewership from the previous episode, which was watched by 0.375 million household viewers with a 0.15 in the 18-49 demographics.

=== Critical reviews ===
"Reunited" received extremely positive reviews from critics. William Hughes of The A.V. Club gave the episode an "A–" grade and wrote, "The times change. The fashions change. But these assholes? And yet! While the 'One year later' chyron — which kicks off the season four return to one of TV's most energetic and hilarious sitcoms — obviously matters less to Nandor, Nadja, and Laszlo than it might to the rest of us (including poor, twice-shipped-in-a-crate Guillermo), there's still a sense of the status quo getting shook with 'Reunited,' in ways both big and small."

Katie Rife of Vulture gave the episode a 4 star rating out of 5 and wrote, "As What We Do in the Shadows settles back in for a new season, the challenge for the characters will be for each of them to take off their blinders and see how their personal obsessions are hurting the ones they love. They'll probably realize this messily and far too late, but that's part of the fun, right? As for the show itself, it'll be interesting to see what happens when it revisits premises it's explored before. Sticking with character development and goofy shit paid off handsomely in season three, so as long as the writing stays sharp, everything should be all right." Tony Sokol of Den of Geek gave the episode a 4 star rating out of 5 and wrote, "'Reunion' is a welcome return. The jokes and action move at a fast pace, and surreal absurdity abounds. The password sequence may be classic TV comedy material, but it is definitely an early clue to a new distraction."

Melody McCune of Telltale TV gave the episode a 4.5 star rating out of 5 and wrote, "Nadja and Laszlo's deliciously dirty sex scenes in 'Reunited' are hysterical, proving this series excels at physical comedy alongside other comedic formats. Who wouldn't pine for a love like theirs?" Alejandra Bodden of Bleeding Cool gave the episode an 8.5 out of 10 rating and wrote, "This was a fantastic start to What We Do in the Shadows Season 4, with two strong outings that just felt right... like time has not passed."
