= Private School (What We Do in the Shadows) =

- What We Do in the Shadows episode
- Episode no.: Season 4 Episode 5
- Directed by: Kyle Newacheck
- Written by: Ayo Edebiri; Shana Gohd
- Cinematography by: DJ Stipsen
- Editing by: Liza Cardinale; Yana Gorskaya
- Production code: XWS04005
- Original air date: August 2, 2022
- Running time: 24 minutes

Guest appearances
- Anthony Atamanuik as Sean Rinaldi; Peter Francis James as Headmaster Warren; Anoop Desai as The Djinn; Sal Vulcano as Himself

Episode chronology
← Previous "The Night Market"	Next → "The Wedding"

"Private School" is the fifth episode of the fourth season of the American mockumentary comedy horror television series What We Do in the Shadows, set in the franchise of the same name. It is the 35th overall episode of the series and was written by consulting producer Ayo Edebiri and co-producer Shana Gohd, and directed by co-executive producer Kyle Newacheck. It was released on FX on August 2, 2022.

The series is set in Staten Island, New York City. Like the 2014 film, the series follows the lives of vampires in the city. These consist of three vampires, Nandor, Laszlo, and Nadja. They live alongside Colin Robinson, an energy vampire; and Guillermo, Nandor's familiar. The series explores the absurdity and misfortunes experienced by the vampires. In the episode, the vampires decide to enroll Baby Colin at a private school, scheduling an interview with the headmaster.

According to Nielsen Media Research, the episode was seen by an estimated 0.339 million household viewers and gained a 0.11 ratings share among adults aged 18–49. The episode received positive reviews, with critics particularly praising the performances, writing, and direction.

== Plot ==
As Baby Colin (Mark Proksch) keeps growing, the vampires feel irritated by his behavior. Guillermo (Harvey Guillén) suggests sending him to school to get a proper education and to hang out with kids of his age, but Laszlo (Matt Berry) disapproves. However, he changes his mind when he sees he is trying to connect with people of his age, but deems that he must go to a private school. When Sean (Anthony Atamanuik) finds their plans, he suggests sending Baby Colin to his high school, Helen Country Day School, keeping them in touch with the headmaster.

The headmaster, Warren, visits the house, with the vampires changing their looks for a more "normal" look. The vampires constantly use their hypnosis to "time out" their sessions, as the details they ask prompt them to change their backgrounds. Originally starting with Nandor (Kayvan Novak) and Nadja (Natasia Demetriou) as Baby Colin's parents, they change it for a gay marriage involving Laszlo and Nandor, and then putting Guillermo as his sole father figure. When the headmasters makes it known that there is a famous actor parent at their school, Nadja decides that they need a famous person involved. For that, they bring Sal Vulcano (whom Laszlo describes as starring in Incomprehensible Jesters), but when more questions arise, Laszlo resorts to snapping Sal's neck.

Guillermo suggests simply using their powers to compel Warren into accepting Baby Colin, but Nadja declares that they are way too invested to go back. They keep erasing Warren's and Sean's memories to change their scenarios. When Warren asks for Baby Colin's transcripts from his previous school, Guillermo obtains a fake transcript from his old guidance counselor.

Guillermo admits to the documentary crew that he is embezzling money from Nadja's nightclub to bribe the counselor, as well as buying himself some expensive products and a new apartment for his mother. Noticing that the documentary crew is watching him, Guillermo defends his actions and unsuccessfully tries to bribe the crew. Nadja is also revealed to be embezzling part of the money, threatening the documentary crew into staying silent.

Baby Colin is not accepted at the private school, as Warren died of a stroke due to being put through 428 hypnoses used on him during the interview. Instead, they enroll Baby Colin in all the community sports league in that area, tiring him to the point that he can now sleep at the house and not annoy the vampires. That night, Nandor, who has been using wishes to change his appearance to please Marwa, feels tired of the amount of changes and asks to be brought back to his original state.

== Production ==
=== Development ===
In July 2022, FX confirmed that the fifth episode of the season would be titled "Private School", and that it would be written by consulting producer Ayo Edebiri and co-producer Shana Gohd, and directed by co-executive producer Kyle Newacheck. This was Edebiri's first writing credit, Gohd's third writing credit, and Newacheck's tenth directing credit.

=== Casting ===
The episode featured an appearance by Sal Vulcano, who plays himself. Collider described his appearance similarly to his role in Impractical Jokers, "as with many of the jokes on his show, he just goes with the flow and takes his cues off the others."

== Reception ==
=== Viewers ===
In its original American broadcast, "Private School" was seen by an estimated 0.391 million household viewers with a 0.12 in the 18-49 demographics. This means that 0.12 percent of all households with televisions watched the episode. This was a 15% increase in viewership from the previous episode, which was watched by 0.339 million household viewers with a 0.11 in the 18-49 demographics.

=== Critical reviews ===
"Private School" received positive reviews. William Hughes of The A.V. Club gave the episode an "A" grade and wrote, "Really, I was just vibing a bit, already doing a bit of writing in my head, as I prepared to explain how this was a pleasantly B-worthy episode of a show that’s always fun, even when it's not swinging for the fences. What I wasn't prepared for, then, was the scene that kicked off after the first commercial break tonight, the one that makes up the bulk of the episode's runtime: an increasingly ludicrous school admissions interview with a straight-laced headmaster, which might be the single funniest and most chaotic sequence that this show has ever produced."

Katie Rife of Vulture gave the episode a perfect 5 star rating out of 5 and wrote, "It's a wonderful showcase for the cast’s talents, which I’ve always felt shine the brightest when the entire ensemble is onscreen together. The scene is heavily edited, so we only get short snippets of whatever improv took place on set. Still, the comedic performance in each of these segments was impeccable, with everyone chiming in at just the right time with sweaty-palmed insistence, mumbled indifference, and/or operatic trilling." Tony Sokol of Den of Geek gave the episode a perfect 5 star rating out of 5 and wrote, "The final twists tie the episode to the philosophies of the classic sitcom The Addams Family. In a house of cutthroats who spill half their blood before swallowing, an embezzler is properly familiar. What We Do in the Shadows avoids pratfalls which have befallen shows with child characters thrust upon them by toppling headfirst. This may get it all out of their system or it may be forgotten. If the vampires have learned nothing in 'Private School,' and they haven't, at least they have nothing to retain."

Melody McCune of Telltale TV gave the episode a perfect 5 star rating out of 5 and wrote, "Overall, 'Private School' is a show-best for What We Do in the Shadows. Hats off to writers Ayo Edebiri and Shana Gohd for penning a brilliant script and Kyle Newacheck for the stellar direction. There's so much heart intertwined with this episode's sharp, biting wit, and the actors are a well-oiled machine in terms of performance. Everyone fires on all cylinders." Alejandra Bodden of Bleeding Cool gave the episode an 8.5 out of 10 rating and wrote, "This week's episode of FX's What We Do in the Shadows, 'Private School', was another fantastic piece to add to the ongoing repertoire of an amazing season so far."

TVLine named the episode as the best comedy episode of 2022.
