= What We Do in the Shadows (TV series) =

American comedy horror television series

- Genre: Comedy horror; Fantasy; Mockumentary
- Created by: Jemaine Clement
- Based on: What We Do in the Shadows by: Jemaine Clement; Taika Waititi
- Starring: Kayvan Novak; Matt Berry; Natasia Demetriou; Harvey Guillén; Mark Proksch; Kristen Schaal
- Opening theme: "You're Dead" by Norma Tanega
- Composers: Mark Mothersbaugh; John Enroth; Albert Fox
- Country of origin: United States
- Original language: English
- No. of seasons: 6
- No. of episodes: 61

Production
- Executive producers: Jemaine Clement; Taika Waititi; Paul Simms; Scott Rudin; Garrett Basch; Eli Bush; Stefani Robinson
- Producers: Joanne Toll; Hartley Gorenstein; Kyle Newacheck; Derek S. Rappaport
- Production locations: Toronto, Canada
- Cinematography: DJ Stipsen
- Editors: Yana Gorskaya; Shawn Paper; Dane McMaster; Antonia de Barros; Varun Viswanath; Tom Eagles
- Running time: 22–30 minutes
- Production companies: Two Canoes Pictures (seasons 1–2); 343 Incorporated; FXP

Original release
- Network: FX
- Release: March 27, 2019 – December 16, 2024

What We Do in the Shadows is an American comedy horror mockumentary fantasy television series created by Jemaine Clement, first broadcast on FX on March 27, 2019, until concluding its run with the end of its sixth season on December 16, 2024. Based on the 2014 New Zealand film written and directed by Clement and Taika Waititi, both of whom act as executive producers, the series follows four vampire roommates on Staten Island, and stars Kayvan Novak, Matt Berry, Natasia Demetriou, Harvey Guillén, Mark Proksch, and Kristen Schaal.

What We Do in the Shadows is the second television series in the franchise after the spin-off Wellington Paranormal (2018–2022). Both shows share the same canon as the original film, with several characters from the film making appearances, including Clement's and Waititi's. The show received critical acclaim, particularly for its cast and writing, and 35 Emmy Award nominations, including four for Outstanding Comedy Series for its second, third, fifth and sixth seasons.

== Premise ==
Traditional vampires Nandor, Laszlo, and Nadja, together with energy vampire Colin Robinson, share a Staten Island residence, maintained by Nandor's familiar Guillermo. The vampires routinely clash with the modern world, other supernatural beings, and each other, while Guillermo earnestly endeavors to balance his loyalty to Nandor with his desire to become a vampire, complicated by his ancestry as a descendant of vampire hunter Van Helsing.

== Cast and characters ==
=== Main ===
- Kayvan Novak as Nandor the Relentless – Once the bloodthirsty leader of the fictional kingdom of Al-Quolanudar in southern Iran and a warrior serving the Ottoman Empire. At age 760, he is the oldest of the group and their self-proclaimed leader, though it is obvious he has little to no authority. Although he genuinely cares for his human familiar Guillermo, he has difficulty expressing it. Nandor is also quite naïve to the ways of modern society and humans, which often results in Guillermo becoming frustrated with him.
- Matt Berry as Leslie "Laszlo" Cravensworth – A 310-year-old vampire from British nobility who was turned by Nadja and is now married to her. A pansexual and former porn actor who is often preoccupied with sexual thoughts, he enjoys sexual encounters with both Nadja and Nandor. His interests are more varied and intellectual than the other characters. He frequently performs scientific experiments on the humans killed by him and the other vampires. According to Nadja, he once forgot to eat for an extended period of time because he was "writing poetry and wanking". He and Nadja were at one time prolific songwriters, and, it seems, wrote what eventually became "Row, Row, Row Your Boat", "Come on Eileen" and "Kokomo". Laszlo also enjoys making topiary sculptures of vulvas in the yard, including those of his wife, and mother.
- Natasia Demetriou as Nadja of Antipaxos – A 500-year-old Greek Romani vampire who turned Laszlo into a vampire and later married him. Abrasive and aggressive, she is frequently frustrated with her male housemates and nostalgic about her human life. The only character she shows any affection for is Laszlo, often wrathfully lashing out at Guillermo. She has entertained an affair with a reincarnated knight named Gregor for hundreds of years, only for him to be decapitated in every reincarnation. She later becomes manager of her own vampire nightclub.
  - Demetriou also plays Nadja's human ghost, split from its corporeal form when Nadja was turned into a vampire, who inhabits a doll which has appeared since the second season.
- Harvey Guillén as Guillermo de la Cruz – Nandor's long-suffering Latino familiar. Despite his frustration with his unreasonable workload and Nandor's disregard for his mortality, he has served his master for more than a decade in the hope of being made a vampire. Guillermo discovers that he is a descendant of the famous vampire hunter Abraham Van Helsing and proves to be very skilled at killing vampires, giving him conflicting feelings about his desire to become a vampire. Guillermo's skill as a vampire slayer leads to him becoming a bodyguard for Nandor, Nadja, and Laszlo. He comes out as gay to his family but reveals his desire to become a vampire at the same time, prompting Nadja to erase their memories of his confession.
- Mark Proksch as Colin Robinson (and Baby Colin / "The Boy") – An energy vampire who lives in the basement. He sustains himself by draining humans and fellow vampires of their life force by being extremely boring or frustrating. As a "day walker", he is not harmed by sunlight or entry into churches, and thus holds a regular job in an office where he feeds on his coworkers' frustrations. This also means that he financially supports the group. Unlike the others, he shows no outward signs of vampirism and appears as a regular human, with the only hints being his glowing irises and demonic facial expression when he feeds on energy, and his reflection showing a pale and decrepit version of himself. Following his 100th birthday, he dies and his infant offspring bursts out of his chest. Having rapidly grown to adulthood, Colin Robinson's son discovers a hidden room filled with Colin Robinson's diaries and regains Colin Robinson's memories as a result, forgetting his time as a child and essentially becoming a reincarnation of Colin Robinson.
- Kristen Schaal as The Guide (also known as the "Floating Woman") – An envoy of the Vampiric Council who is able to teleport short distances and sometimes speaks in a demonic voice. She frequently expresses her desire to be socially accepted by the other vampires, yet is almost always rejected. She later works for Nadja as the latter turns the Vampiric Council's headquarters into a nightclub. (seasons 5–6; guest season 1; recurring seasons 3–4)

=== Recurring ===
- Doug Jones as Baron Afanas – An ancient vampire from the Old Country who believes vampires should rule the world. Both Nadja and Laszlo had secret affairs with the Baron despite his lack of genitals. Later it is disclosed that he is not actually a Baron, but simply "barren" because he was unable to have children. In the first season, Guillermo inadvertently kills the Baron by opening a door and exposing him to sunlight. In the third season, however, it is revealed that he barely survived, albeit reduced to his head, torso and left arm. In later seasons, The Baron chooses to live a quaint, suburban lifestyle with The Sire, another legendary vampire. (seasons 1, 3–6)
- Anthony Atamanuik as Sean Rinaldi – The human next-door neighbor. He sometimes witnesses Laszlo doing something vampiric but is easily hypnotized into forgetting everything. The vampires spare him because he brings their trash cans in when they forget, and Laszlo considers Sean his best friend. In season 5, it's implied that Sean is slowly, yet consistently, becoming dumber due to experiencing a constant stream of hypnosis and his rampant alcoholism.
- Beanie Feldstein as Jenna – a LARPer and virgin whom Guillermo lured for the vampires to feast on. She was later transformed into a vampire by Nadja who witnessed her being treated poorly by her peers. During her vampire training with Nadja, she discovers she has the rare ability to turn invisible, which fits the tendency of people to ignore her, yet she struggles with turning into a bat. (season 1)
- Veronika Slowikowska as Shanice – Jenna's college roommate who witnesses her transformation into a vampire. Shanice later joins the Mosquito Collectors of the Tri-State Area, a secret team of amateur vampire hunters. (seasons 1–2)
- Nick Kroll as Simon the Devious – A vampire who rules over the Manhattan vampires and owns the Sassy Cat nightclub. He was initially a close friend to the Staten Island vampires when they first arrived in America, but he quickly became their shared enemy thanks to his willingness to trick and betray the trio. He is obsessed with Laszlo's cursed hat made out of witch skin and is often surrounded by a posse of vampires called "The Leatherskins". (guest seasons 1–2, 4)
- Jake McDorman as Jeff Suckler – A reincarnation of Nadja's former human lover, Gregor, a knight who has been killed by decapitation in each of his lives. Nadja eventually restores Jeff's memories of his previous lives so that he can be more like his former self, leading to him falling into insanity and being committed to a mental institution. It is later revealed to Nadja and Gregor that Laszlo had been causing each of his deaths throughout history, which he does again. (season 1; guest season 2)
- Vanessa Bayer as Evie Russell – Colin Robinson's co-worker. He discovers that she is an advanced form of energy vampire — an emotional vampire — who feeds off of the pity and sadness generated by her outlandish stories of suffering and misfortune. She and Colin Robinson date for a short time, feeding together on bored and pitying humans until he begins to feel the relationship is unhealthy. In season 5, she becomes Staten Island's City Comptroller, taking over for Colin Robinson's campaign after he intentionally exposed his penis in a video meeting. Her first name is a homophone of "E.V.", for Emotional Vampire. (guest seasons 1, 5)
- Marceline Hugot as Barbara Lazarro – The president of the Staten Island Council. She was going to be the vampires' way of taking over Staten Island until Laszlo left a pile of dead raccoons on her doorstep in an attempt to win her trust, resulting in her believing it was a form of terrorist threat. She later appears running against Colin Robinson in the comptroller election. (guest seasons 1, 5)
- Chris Sandiford as Derek – A vampire hunter turned vampire and convenience store clerk. (seasons 2–5, guest season 6)
- Myrna Cabello as Silvia de la Cruz – Guillermo's mother (seasons 2, 4–5)
- Haley Joel Osment as Topher – Nadja and Laszlo's familiar who is accidentally killed and revived as a zombie. Unlike Guillermo, Topher has no interest in becoming a vampire. He is energetic, fun-loving, and charismatic, and he is well-liked by all other members of the household, except Guillermo. (guest seasons 2, 5)
- Benedict Wong as Wallace – A necromancer and tchotchke salesman whom Lazlo views as a fraud and con artist and often feuds with him. (guest seasons 2, 5)
- Marissa Jaret Winokur as Charmaine Rinaldi – Sean's wife. (guest seasons 2–6)
- Anoop Desai as Djinn – Nandor's magical genie, who is indebted to grant him a large number of wishes. (season 4; guest season 5)
- Parisa Fakhri as Marwa – Nandor's resurrected ex-wife, now fiancée (season 4, guest season 6)
- Frankie Quiñones as Miguel – Guillermo's cousin (guest seasons 4–6)
- Mike O'Brien as Jerry the Vampire – The house's fifth roommate who has been in a "super slumber" since 1976, and intended to be awoken on New Year's Eve, 1996. (season 6)
- Tim Heidecker as Jordan – Senior partner at Cannon Capital Strategies, the private equity firm where Guillermo, Nadja, and Nandor have been hired. (season 6)
- Andy Assaf as Cravensworth's Monster – A Frankenstein-like creature assembled and animated by Laszlo. (season 6)

=== Guests ===
==== Season 1 ====
- Arj Barker as Arjan – The pack leader of the Staten Island Werewolf Support Group. He entered into a truce between his kind and the vampires (which was created in 1993).
- Dave Bautista and Alexandra Henrikson as Garrett and Vasillika the Defiler – A duo of vampires imprisoned by the council after Garrett was framed by Laszlo for turning a baby into a vampire (which is very illegal), and Vasillika for too much defiling.
- Mary Gillis as June – Nadja and Laszlo's familiar. She appears to be an ill old woman who communicates through grunts. She is killed when the Baron sucks all her blood when he arrives on Staten Island.
- Jeremy O. Harris as Colby – A human familiar to Dantos the Cruel and Radinka the Brutal, two 400-year-old vampires who appear to be children while Colby portrays as their father.
- Gloria Laino as The Baron's Familiar – The Baron's familiar, who maintains a silent, watchful eye on the vampires of Staten Island as her master awakes. Guillermo says that she pops out of nowhere and hears "everything".
- Paul Reubens as Paul – A member of the council. (Note: Reubens played a local vampire king's acolyte in Buffy the Vampire Slayer (1992).)
- Tilda Swinton as a fictionalized version of herself who is the leader of the Vampiric Council. (Note: Swinton played a vampire lover in Only Lovers Left Alive (2013).)
- Wesley Snipes as Wesley the Daywalker / Wesley Sykes – A half-vampire member of the Council who could not participate in person but only video chat through Skype. Danny despises him, claiming he is a vampire hunter, which he denies. (Note: Snipes played half-vampire daywalker Eric Cross Brooks / Blade who hunted vampires in the Blade film series (1998-2004), as well as Deadpool & Wolverine (2024).)
- Hayden Szeto as Jonathan – A LARPer college student that Guillermo lured for the vampires to feast on. However, Colin Robinson beat them to it by draining his energy instead.
- Danny Trejo as Danny – A Hispanic tattooed member of the council. He has an open dislike towards Wesley. (Note: Trejo played a vampire bartender in From Dusk till Dawn (1996).)
- Taika Waititi, Jonathan Brugh, and Jemaine Clement reprise their roles as Viago von Dorna Schmarten Scheden Heimburg, Deacon Brucke, and Vladislav the Poker from the original film. Three vampires arrived from New Zealand to participate in the Vampiric Council. (Note: Indeed every known member of the Vampiric Council has played an on-screen vampire before. Mentioned only: Robert Pattinson as Edward Cullen in The Twilight Saga (2008–2012), Kiefer Sutherland in The Lost Boys (1987), Tom Cruise and Brad Pitt as Lestat de Lioncourt and Louis de Pointe du Lac in Interview with the Vampire (1994). It is reported that Waititi denied Cate Blanchett council membership due to insufficient on-screen vampiric experience.)
- Bobby Wilson as Marcus – The actual Native American member of the Werewolf Pack. He is Native American, and a werewolf but, as he explains, "Not a werewolf because" he is Native American. "It's not an ethnic thing." (Note: Wilson played an actor auditioning for a "sexy Indian" role in Twilight in the 1491s satire, New Moon Wolf Pack Audition (2009).)
- Evan Rachel Wood as Evan the Immortal Princess of the Undead – A member of the Council who just goes by her first name. (Note: Wood played Sophie-Anne Leclerq, the Vampire Queen of Louisiana, in True Blood seasons 2–4 (2009–2011).)
- Hannan Younis as Ange – An African American werewolf and part of Arjan's group. She undermines Arjan's rules and is openly hostile towards Nadja due to Nadja's insulting the werewolves by assuming they are all "Indian" (as in, Native Americans).

==== Season 2 ====
- James Frain as the voice of Black Peter – A goat and witch's familiar
- Mark Hamill as Jim the Vampire – A vampire who claims that Laszlo owes him rent money from the 1800s and demands retribution.
- Greta Lee as Celeste – A familiar who pretends to be a vampire
- Lucy Punch as Lilith – A witch and rival of Nadja
- Craig Robinson as Claude – The leader of the Mosquito Collectors of the Tri-State Area, a secret team of amateur vampire hunters.

==== Season 3 ====
- Julie Klausner and Cole Escola as The Gargoyles – A duo of gargoyles who gossip and give tips to The Guide.
- Lauren Collins as Meg – A gym receptionist on whom Nandor has a crush.
- Tyler Alvarez as Wes Blankenship – The leader of a group of rebellious young vampires that refuse to follow the council's orders.
- Aida Turturro as Gail – Nandor's on-again, off-again werewolf-turned-vampire girlfriend.
- Catherine Cohen as Sheila – The siren
- Scott Bakula as himself
- Cree Summer as Jan – A vampire scam artist who is head of the Post-Chiropteran Wellness Center cult
- Donal Logue as a fictionalized vampire version of himself
- Khandi Alexander as Contessa Carmilla De Mornay
- David Cross as Dominykas the Dreadful

==== Season 4 ====
- Affion Crockett as Richie Suck, superstar vampire rapper
- Fred Armisen as Doctor DJ Tom Schmidt, Richie Suck's familiar who is manipulating him for financial gain.
- Sal Vulcano as himself
- Sklar Brothers as Toby and Bran
- Al Roberts as Freddie, Guillermo's boyfriend
- Sofia Coppola as herself
- Thomas Mars as himself
- Jim Jarmusch as himself
- Michael McDonald as Gustave Leroy

==== Season 5 ====
- Robert Smigel as Alexander, a man Nandor befriends at the gym
- Hannibal Buress as a member of the energy vampire council
- Aparna Nancherla as a member of the energy vampire council
- Martha Kelly as the chair of the energy vampire council
- Gregg Turkington as a member of the energy vampire council
- Jo Firestone as a member of the energy vampire council
- John Slattery as himself
- Wayne Federman as a vampire urgent care doctor
- Kerri Kenney-Silver as Helen "The Magic Woman" Johnson
- Patton Oswalt as himself

==== Season 6 ====
- Steve Coogan as Lord Roderick Cravensworth, Laszlo's father
- Jon Glaser as a demon
- Kevin Pollak as Cal Bodian, the lead actor of the TV series P.I. Undercover: New York
- Zach Woods as Joel, an old office work friend of Colin Robinson
- Alexander Skarsgård as a vampire (Note: Although Skarsgård's character shares a strong resemblance to his True Blood character Eric Northman, the character's name is not stated in the episode.)

== Episodes ==
Season	Episodes	Originally released	
Season	Episodes	First released	Last released
1	10	March 27, 2019	May 29, 2019
2	10	April 15, 2020	June 10, 2020
3	10	September 2, 2021	October 28, 2021
4	10	July 12, 2022	September 6, 2022
5	10	July 13, 2023	August 31, 2023
6	11	October 21, 2024	December 16, 2024

=== Season 1 (2019) ===
No. overall	No. in season	Title	Directed by	Written by	Original release date	Prod. code	U.S. viewers (millions)
1	1	"Pilot"	Taika Waititi	Jemaine Clement	March 27, 2019	XWS01001	0.617
Four vampire roommates live together in Staten Island: Nandor the Relentless, the self-appointed leader of the house; Laszlo and Nadja, a married couple; and Colin Robinson, an energy vampire who works in an office and drains humans of their energy by boring or irritating them. The other vampires are often annoyed by his presence. They are joined by their familiars, including Guillermo, who has served Nandor for ten years and hopes to become a vampire one day. Nadja believes she has found her former lover Gregor who has been reincarnated as a human named Jeff; Nadja reveals Gregor has been decapitated in each of his lives. Nandor receives a letter and holds a meeting announcing Baron Afanas, an ancient vampire from the Old Country, will be arriving. The vampires then prepare for his arrival. When the Baron arrives, he announces their plan to take over the Western Hemisphere.
2	2	"City Council"	Jemaine Clement	Paul Simms	April 3, 2019	XWS01002	0.658
The vampires begin their first step in their plan of conquest: taking over Staten Island. They attend local city council meetings, trying to persuade the mayor and the council members, but they fail when Nandor attempts to threaten the council. Laszlo seeks out the mayor and attempts to convince her to surrender, killing the raccoons that had been eating her garbage and leaving the bodies on her porch. Meanwhile, Nandor seeks out and hypnotizes the mayor's opponent in the upcoming election, causing him to react violently and be arrested during the next council meeting. Nadja follows Jenna, a virgin LARPer, and, after observing how she is mistreated by the rest of the group, turns her into a vampire.
3	3	"Werewolf Feud"	Jemaine Clement	Josh Lieb	April 10, 2019	XWS01004	0.305
Laszlo finds that his topiary garden has been urinated on by werewolves and sets traps, sparking a feud with the pack. Following the 1993 pact, Nandor engages in single combat with the werewolf pack's champion, ending with him throwing a chew-toy off a roof to win. Meanwhile, Colin Robinson competes with Evie, an emotional vampire at work who feeds on the sympathy of her co-workers by telling upsetting or depressing stories. They eventually decide to team up and have a brief relationship, before breaking up.
4	4	"Manhattan Night Club"	Jemaine Clement	Tom Scharpling	April 17, 2019	XWS01003	0.439
The vampires attempt to form an alliance with Simon the Devious, the leader of the Manhattan vampires, to aid in their takeover. Laszlo insists on wearing a hat made of witch skin, which Nadja insists is cursed. Laszlo runs into several instances of bad luck. The vampires go to his headquarters, a nightclub, to talk with him. Simon agrees to an alliance, but only if Laszlo gives him the hat. Simon kicks them out once he has the hat, and the nightclub promptly explodes. Guillermo continues to feel underappreciated, so Nandor makes it up to him by flying him over the city, but he accidentally drops him, which puts him in the hospital. Laszlo reclaims his hat from a badly injured and bandaged Simon. Meanwhile, Jenna continues her vampire transition.
5	5	"Animal Control"	Jackie van Beek	Duncan Sarkies	April 24, 2019	XWS01008	0.320
Nadja and Laszlo feed together, but on their way to the house Laszlo decides to torment his new neighbor Phil in bat-form, leading to him being knocked out with a broom by Phil's girlfriend and taken to an animal shelter. Nandor, Guillermo, and Colin Robinson follow to attempt a rescue and first release a seemingly rabid bat before Nandor lets himself be caught in the form of a dog but is trapped in a cage. Meanwhile, Nadja goes to see Jeff (Gregor) and they go out to a carnival. Nadja is bored and frustrated by him and makes him remember his past lives. The two celebrate, but Nadja is forced to leave. She rescues Laszlo and Nandor with ease, while Jeff is arrested by police.
6	6	"Baron's Night Out"	Jackie van Beek	Iain Morris	May 1, 2019	XWS01005	0.418
Baron Afanas wakes up and demands the vampires take him out to see the city. The vampires are sick and tired of the Baron's old fashioned ideas, so they intend on killing him. The vampires and the Baron go out and spend the night going to various bars and nightclubs, where they drink blood of drugged clubbers and allow the Baron to eat pizza (with disastrous results as vampires cannot consume human food without being violently sick). After returning home in the morning, the Baron is accidentally seemingly killed by sunlight when Guillermo opens the front door.
7	7	"The Trial"	Taika Waititi	Jemaine Clement	May 8, 2019	XWS01006	0.527
The three vampires must face the Vampiric Council for the death of the Baron, having no memory of the previous night due to their consumption of drug-laced blood. At the trial, Guillermo admits he killed the Baron, but the council does not believe him. Nandor then takes the blame, and he, along with Laszlo and Nadja are sentenced to death by sunlight. The three vampires are put in a well and await their death, but Colin Robinson and Guillermo rescue them by blocking the sun with an umbrella.
8	8	"Citizenship"	Jason Woliner	Stefani Robinson	May 15, 2019	XWS01007	0.522
Nadja guides Jenna on how to be a vampire after her transition is complete. Jenna learns that her vampire power is invisibility and she later makes her first kill. Nandor, who learns that the country he was born in no longer exists, applies for American citizenship after being suggested by Guillermo. However, Nandor fails the process due to his lack of knowledge about America and his inability to recite the Oath of Allegiance (his mouth catching fire upon saying the word "God").
9	9	"The Orgy"	Jason Woliner	Marika Sawyer	May 22, 2019	XWS01009	0.434
The vampires plan for the bi-annual vampire orgy, which must go perfectly, because throwing a bad orgy results in eternal humiliation. In the attic, Laszlo finds his old vampire-themed pornos he made. Nadja insults Laszlo when she tells him she finds them boring. After everyone has arrived for the orgy, Laszlo professes his love to Nadja, which sours the mood of the orgy and everyone leaves.
10	10	"Ancestry"	Taika Waititi	Jemaine Clement & Stefani Robinson & Tom Scharpling & Paul Simms	May 29, 2019	XWS01010	0.427
Guillermo has the vampires' DNA tested to show them their heritage. While Laszlo and Nadja are uninterested, Nandor discovers he has over 200,000 living descendants, including one who lives in Staten Island. Nandor visits her, a 94-year-old woman, by floating by her window with a teddy bear; this results in her having a fatal heart attack. Nandor has the other vampires attend her funeral in a church, and Laszlo and Nadja run out after catching on fire. Nadja calls out to Gregor, who is now in a psychiatric ward after being arrested previously, and he break out. Gregor goes to the house to see Nadja, but Laszlo appears, and reveals it was he who killed Gregor in each of his past lives. Laszlo declares his love for Nadja, and Gregor stands down. As Gregor leaves, he is decapitated by a metal wire that was strung across that yard that Laszlo was using to trim a topiary bush sculpted like Nadja. Guillermo discovers he is a descendant of Van Helsing and wonders if he is destined to kill the vampires.

=== Season 2 (2020) ===
No. overall	No. in season	Title	Directed by	Written by	Original release date	Prod. code	U.S. viewers (millions)
11	1	"Resurrection"	Kyle Newacheck	Marika Sawyer	April 15, 2020	XWS02001	0.537
Laszlo and Nadja are elated with their latest familiar, Topher (Haley Joel Osment), who appears to be a most dedicated servant when they are around; however, he is just a slacker who has no desire to become a vampire. Topher's attitude annoys Guillermo, who has been busy secretly killing vampire assassins who are invading the house on behalf of the Vampiric Council. Topher is accidentally electrocuted and dies, causing Nadja and the others to visit Wallace (Benedict Wong), a necromancer. Laszlo believes Wallace is just a shyster as he demands $350 for the job. Wallace revives Topher, but he comes back as a ravenous zombie who continually attacks Guillermo. The vampires bring Topher back to Wallace, where Wallace agrees to take him back, placing Topher in his basement alongside other zombies to make miniature license plate keychains.
12	2	"Ghosts"	Kyle Newacheck	Paul Simms	April 15, 2020	XWS02003	0.409
The vampires deduce that a ghost has invaded their home, and Nadja performs a seance to make the ghost appear. The ghost turns out to be the spirit of her former lover Jeff/Gregor, who has unfinished business. The vampires, being dead themselves, wonder if they have their own ghosts with unfinished business, so they perform a second seance. Their spirit doppelgangers appear and each tries to help their own ghost complete whatever unfinished business they have. Nandor and Laszlo help their ghosts to pass on, while Nadja's ghost ends up inhabiting a doll and sticking around, and Colin Robinson conjures his dead grandmother just to try to tell his "updog" joke.
13	3	"Brain Scramblies"	Kyle Newacheck	Jake Bender & Zach Dunn	April 22, 2020	XWS02002	0.566
The vampires are invited to their neighbor Sean's Super Bowl party, which they believe is a "Superb Owl" party. Sean mentions to Nandor and Laszlo that he only sees them at night and jokes that they're like vampires. Believing Sean is serious, the two consider killing him before deciding to double-hypnotize him, but they overdo it, causing him to lose all his memories. Nadja meets Sean's mother Joan, who Nadja used to play with when Joan was a child. Meanwhile, Guillermo searches for virgins for his master, which leads him to a mosquito-hunting club meeting. However, he learns that this is a cover for a group of vampire hunters. Among the members is Shanice, Jenna's college roommate, who is aware of her being a vampire. Having never thought about the victims he brought to his masters, Guillermo feels guilty and questions his role as a familiar.
14	4	"The Curse"	Liza Johnson	Sarah Naftalis	April 29, 2020	XWS02004	0.618
The vampires panic after receiving a chain e-mail threatening them with death if they do not forward it to 10 more people. Colin Robinson takes the opportunity to use the chain e-mail to feed himself, while calming the other vampires. Meanwhile, Guillermo visits his vampire hunting group to find them about to embark on a mission to attack a home full of vampires. His initial delight on finding out it is a different house, and not his, turns to terror when it turns out that this house really is inhabited by vampires. Guillermo manages to kill many of them, but one of his team members, Derek, also dies.
15	5	"Colin's Promotion"	Jemaine Clement	Shana Gohd	May 6, 2020	XWS02005	0.378
Colin Robinson expresses grief that his needs for both energy and companionship are incompatible. He later receives a promotion at work and forces subordinates to listen to him, which multiplies his power and forms a feedback loop allowing him to drain people and plants instantly, even gaining the ability to fly. After draining his housemates to the point that they age, he splits into three copies of himself, who drain each other, leaving one survivor. The survivor, having financially destroyed his company, moves to a new one. Meanwhile, Nadja discovers that Nandor pillaged the village she grew up in, causing a rift in their friendship.
16	6	"On the Run"	Yana Gorskaya	Stefani Robinson	May 13, 2020	XWS02007	0.436
A vengeful and menacing vampire named Jim (Mark Hamill) arrives at the Staten Island vampire residence in search of Laszlo, who had failed to pay him a month's rent in California 167 years ago. Laszlo flees and sets up shop in a small town in Pennsylvania (as it sounded like Transylvania), killing the owner of a bar and assuming control of the establishment. In his new human persona, Laszlo goes by the name Jackie Daytona, and becomes greatly admired by the town not only for his party-throwing skills but for his great support of the local girls volleyball team. While Laszlo has a great time in his new life, his vampire roommates have trouble coping with his disappearance. Jim the Vampire also continues his search for Laszlo.
17	7	"The Return"	Jemaine Clement	Jemaine Clement	May 20, 2020	XWS02006	0.377
The vampires are visited by an old foe, Simon the Devious, who is now down on his luck and only has two people left in his crew after the accident at his nightclub involving Laszlo's cursed witch hat. Nadja encourages the crew to welcome Simon into the house with open arms. Laszlo, however, is still very suspicious of Simon's true intentions. Carol, one of Simon's crew members, accuses Guillermo of being a vampire slayer, after which he kills her in an act of self-defense. Nandor finds out about it and becomes wary of Guillermo. Meanwhile, Colin Robinson uses social media to troll people online and feed on their energy. However, someone gets all of his accounts banned, which greatly upsets him. Laszlo and Simon fight over the hat while Colin Robinson confronts the user in-person, but they turn out to be an actual troll.
18	8	"Collaboration"	Yana Gorskaya	Sam Johnson & Chris Marcil	May 27, 2020	XWS02008	0.443
Laszlo hears the song "Come On Eileen" while attacking a jogger, and is shocked as he believes he is the song's original writer. Looking back through his old songs reminds him and Nadja of when they used to sing as a duo. Colin Robinson hears them and offers to set them up with a gig, knowing they'll be awful and that he'll be able to absorb the audience's negative energy. Meanwhile, Benjy, Nandor's previous familiar, returns and goes with Guillermo to a familiar meet-up where Guillermo finds that one of the familiars, Celeste, has been turned into a vampire. He confronts Nandor, who waffles about when he will change Guillermo, so Guillermo leaves to join Celeste. He likes the inclusive atmosphere of her dwelling, but this comes to an end when her master and her clique return home and Celeste is revealed to be a fraud. Nadja and Laszlo play several songs to boos and catcalls, powering Colin Robinson, but they win the audience back with their version of "Kokomo", which they are surprised to find the audience already knows.
19	9	"Witches"	Kyle Newacheck	William Meny	June 3, 2020	XWS02009	0.433
When Laszlo and Nandor are captured by witches, Nadja, Colin Robinson, and Guillermo pursue and track the witches to a shop. Guillermo goes inside to investigate. Nadja and Colin Robinson are captured while waiting outside, and Guillermo is imprisoned with them. Laszlo and Nandor discover that the witches want their semen to make a youth potion. Laszlo is enthusiastic until he discovers how unpleasant the process actually is. Guillermo discovers the way out of the holding cell and he, Nadja, and Colin Robinson go to rescue Laszlo and Nandor, but are outmatched. Guillermo saves the day by striking a bargain with the witches, where he will provide them with an unlimited supply of vampire semen in exchange for a percentage of the witches' profits.
20	10	"Nouveau Théâtre des Vampires"	Kyle Newacheck	Sam Johnson & Stefani Robinson & Paul Simms	June 10, 2020	XWS02010	0.406
Nandor wants to get out of bed but Guillermo is nowhere to be found. Nandor looks for him and discovers a note in which Guillermo wrote "Sorry". Without Guillermo as a familiar, the vampires leave their residence a mess, with corpses and blood all over the place. The entire vampire residence receive a letter inviting them to the most prestigious vampire event in existence, the Nouveau Théâtre des Vampires. They go to the event with their finest clothing, while Guillermo struggles to live with his mom in the Bronx. Guillermo finally decides to visit the gang, only to find an empty house and the letter the vampires left behind. He immediately realizes that the invite was a trap set by the Vampiric Council and goes to the theater to save them. Nadja, Laszlo, Nandor, and Colin Robinson are restrained by the vampires at the theater, led by Vladislav, and are sentenced to death for the whole theater to watch, having been blamed for the deaths of all the vampires that Guillermo has killed since the death of the Baron. Guillermo comes to the rescue and slaughters most of the vampires in the theater, saving his group, but in the process shows his true colors as a vampire hunter.

=== Season 3 (2021) ===
No. overall	No. in season	Title	Directed by	Written by	Original release date	Prod. code	U.S. viewers (millions)
21	1	"The Prisoner"	Kyle Newacheck	Paul Simms	September 2, 2021	XWS03001	0.498
Twenty-nine days after the massacre, the vampires are trying to decide what to do about Guillermo, who is supposedly imprisoned in a cage in their basement but has actually been regularly sneaking out of the basement to perform his usual household duties. Nandor vouches for Guillermo as he saved their lives, while Laszlo, Nadja, and Nadja's ghost (still possessing a doll) are in favor of killing him to keep themselves safe. Guillermo reveals his freedom when he leaves the basement to protect the vampires from the arrival of a messenger from the Supreme Vampiric Council, the group who oversees all of the world's other Vampiric Councils. The messenger, referred to as "The Guide", promises not to harm the vampires and delivers a video message from Viago, a member of the Supreme Council, who explains that since Guillermo has now killed almost 70% of the most powerful vampires in the New York area, the Supreme Council has been forced to appoint Nandor, Nadja, Laszlo and Colin Robinson as the new Vampiric Council for the American Eastern Seaboard. The vampires decide to make Guillermo their bodyguard, and perform a group hypnosis ritual on him that will prevent him from ever harming them: Guillermo privately reveals that vampire hypnosis no longer works on him, but plays along anyway. The Guide escorts the quartet and Guillermo to the Council headquarters, where Nandor, Nadja, and Colin Robinson all begin arguing over which of them should be the "Supreme Leader" of the new Council.
22	2	"The Cloak of Duplication"	Yana Gorskaya	Sam Johnson & Chris Marcil	September 2, 2021	XWS03002	0.448
Nandor and Nadja reluctantly agree to be the co-leaders of the new Council, although they each plan to ultimately take the role entirely for themselves. The Guide gives the group a tour of the Council's facilities, including the "Chamber of Curiosities", which houses many ancient mystical artifacts and keepsakes: it also houses the Sire, the world's first and most ancient vampire, who is kept locked up behind a sealed door. Nandor decides to use one of the magical artifacts, the Cloak of Duplication (which allows one person to take on the exact likeness of another) to win over a human woman named Meg, a receptionist at a gym where he sometimes works out, by having Laszlo use the Cloak to take on his appearance and woo Meg in his stead. Colin Robinson and Laszlo each try and fail to impress Meg using this method, although Laszlo hypnotizes her to forget those incidents afterwards; Guillermo then tries instead and seems to have more success, although Meg comes to the conclusion that Nandor and Guillermo have feelings for each other. Meanwhile, Nandor, Nadja and Colin Robinson visit a group of rebellious young vampires who have refused to obey the Council's orders, led by a vampire named Wes Blankenship. After they try and fail to negotiate peacefully with the rebellious group, Nadja kills Wes and thereby secures the others' obedience. Nandor then visits Meg at the gym and confesses his feelings for her, but she reveals that she is a lesbian and suggests that he pursue a relationship with Guillermo instead, causing him to erase her memories again and leave. Nandor and Nadja argue over her belief that he has grown soft during his time in America, and she uses the Cloak to play a prank on him.
23	3	"Gail"	Kyle Newacheck	Marika Sawyer	September 9, 2021	XWS03003	0.311
Nandor begins leaving the vampires' house at odd hours. The others follow him one night and discover that he has been hooking up with a human woman named Gail, who has been his on-again, off-again partner for the past forty years. Nadja explains that Gail has always turned Nandor down every time he offers to turn her into a vampire and marry her, but Nandor decides to try again and obtains an engagement ring with the intent of proposing to her, which distresses Guillermo. However, Gail is revealed to have recently become a werewolf, which angers Nadja and Laszlo. Nandor convinces the other vampires to visit the rest of Gail's pack, which leads to a confrontation when it is revealed that Gail is also dating Anton, one of the werewolves. Guillermo proposes that the vampires and werewolves resolve their differences "Twilight-style" by playing a game of kickball, which ends badly when Nadja accidentally kills Gail by hitting her in the head with a ball. Nandor revives Gail by turning her into a vampire/werewolf hybrid and proposes to her, but she turns him down again. Meanwhile, Laszlo and Colin Robinson discover that Laszlo's old "jalopy" car, which had been confiscated and impounded by the previous Vampiric Council many years earlier, is stored in a secret room in the Council's library. Laszlo gets the car working again, and they move it out of the Council building by disassembling it and rebuilding it outside, although they damage several artifacts in the process. Laszlo and Colin Robinson then take the rest of the group on a drive around the neighborhood to lift Nandor's spirits.
24	4	"The Casino"	Yana Gorskaya	Sarah Naftalis	September 16, 2021	XWS03004	0.462
The vampires are all invited on a group vacation to Atlantic City by their neighbors Sean and Charmaine, while Nandor convinces the other vampires that they should start treating Guillermo as part of their group rather than as a familiar. The vampires spend their first night having fun in a casino, before returning to their hotel rooms to sleep through the day. However, Nandor, Nadja and Laszlo are horrified to discover that the hotel housekeeping staff have vacuumed up all of their ancestral soil (which they had brought with them and spread under their hotel beds), without which they will begin to lose their powers. Desperate for a solution, Nandor sends Guillermo on a mission to Europe, where he obtains bags of soil from England, Greece, and Iran, to replenish each of the vampires' supply of ancestral soil. Meanwhile, the vampires remain stuck in Atlantic City and begin to weaken as their powers slowly fade; Laszlo and Nadja try to help Sean when he relapses into his gambling addiction and loses a large amount of money, while Colin Robinson teaches Nandor about the origins of the universe after Nandor plays a casino game based on the TV series The Big Bang Theory, prompting Nandor to question what the title refers to, spiraling Nandor into an existential crisis when he learns his religious assumptions of the universe are incorrect. Eventually, Guillermo returns with the ancestral soil, and the vampires use it to restore their powers. The vampires and Guillermo then devise a plan to rig a boxing match so that they can win a large enough bet to earn back all of Sean's lost money (as well as a loan that Laszlo borrowed from Sean to pay for Guillermo's plane tickets), and are successful, although one of the two boxers is accidentally killed in the process. Sean thanks Laszlo for helping him, but then proceeds to gamble all of the newly-earned money away as well, before the group finally heads back home to New York.
25	5	"The Chamber of Judgement"	Kyle Newacheck	William Meny	September 23, 2021	XWS03005	0.399
Nandor and Nadja are excited to preside over their first Vampiric Council Tribunal, while Laszlo and Colin Robinson are invited to a "boys' night" with Sean and his friends. Nandor and Nadja cannot agree over which of them should sit on the Council leader's throne, so Guillermo convinces them to let him sit on it in disguise. Unfortunately, one of the vampires that they are charged with judging is Derek, a member of the Mosquito Club of amateur vampire hunters who was turned into a vampire during the group's first hunt and has been unknowingly breaking vampire rules of secrecy ever since, including the purchase of a hellhound (which looks like a normal dog, but can breathe fire). Nandor and Nadja sentence Derek to death, but Guillermo is plagued with guilt since he left Derek behind on the night that he was turned into a vampire, and helps him to escape from the execution chamber. Meanwhile, Sean confesses to Laszlo that he has become involved in a pyramid scheme focused on selling a special brand of pillows, and that he is being taken to small claims court by the man who sold him a large number of pillows after failing to repay him. Laszlo offers to help, and he and Colin Robinson become Sean's representatives in court: however, they are unsuccessful and Sean loses his case, prompting a despondent Laszlo to get drunk by feeding on a group of drunken businessmen. Guillermo recruits a drunken Laszlo to help him save Derek, convincing Laszlo to act as Derek's defense attorney and promising that Laszlo will help Derek to work off his sentence. Nandor and Nadja reluctantly agree, and Derek is put to work using hypnosis to sell Sean's pillows so that Sean can pay off his debt, while Guillermo adopts the hellhound.
26	6	"The Escape"	Yana Gorskaya	Jake Bender & Zach Dunn	September 30, 2021	XWS03006	0.416
After Nadja forgets to put Nandor in charge of feeding the Sire, the ancient vampire becomes so hungry that it tunnels out of its cell and goes on a killing spree across the city. Nandor blames himself and holds a magical "vampire press conference" to explain the situation, but this only causes more panic due to the widely held belief that if a vampire dies, so do all the vampires that they have created; therefore, if the Sire dies, all other vampires will die as well. Laszlo does not believe that theory, as it would mean that the Baron's death would have caused him and Nadja to die too, but he and Colin Robinson decide to confirm that by digging up the Baron's remains. Upon exhuming the body with Guillermo's help, they are surprised to discover that the Baron is actually still alive (although he has lost an arm and the lower half of his body), as he was revived by a bottle of blood that the vampires poured over his remains before burying him. However, Laszlo is alarmed by this, as it could mean that the theory is correct after all. As he is a vampire hunter, Guillermo offers to lead the hunt for the Sire. The Guide uses her network of "Watchers" (living gargoyles) to trace the Sire to Queens, where the group are able to corner it inside a department store. Laszlo and Nandor each try to capture the Sire, but it easily overpowers them; however, the Baron then reveals that he can communicate with the Sire using an ancient vampire language. With the Baron acting as a translator, the vampires are able to pacify the Sire, and find a more comfortable home for it in Nutley, New Jersey, along with Guillermo's hellhound and the Baron.
27	7	"The Siren"	Yana Gorskaya	Shana Gohd	October 7, 2021	XWS03007	0.326
Nandor and Nadja decide to try a new approach to running the Council by leading on alternating days; however, this just creates more conflict between them. Due to the vampires' being much more busy, Nadja's ghost feels unappreciated and out of place due to their not spending any time with her, and ultimately decides to leave the house. Nadja is overcome with guilt when she finds out, and recruits Nandor and Guillermo to help track the ghost down. They trace her to a grocery store, where the ghost jumps from her old doll body into several new ones, before settling on an inflatable union rat and running off into the city. Meanwhile, Laszlo and Colin Robinson steal a boat to sail to Plum Island, after Colin Robinson finds an old map suggesting that information relating to his energy-vampire heritage can be found there. However, on the way there, they are drawn off-course by a strange song and run aground on a different island that is inhabited by a siren named Sheila, who captures them both and plans to eat them. Laszlo escapes by transforming into a bat, meets up with the other vampires, and convinces Guillermo to help him rescue Colin Robinson. After purchasing two pairs of noise-cancelling headphones at Best Buy with Guillermo's help, Laszlo returns to the island to find that Colin Robinson has apparently fallen in love with Sheila, but he rescues him anyway and escapes from the island; unfortunately, they leave some of the documentary crew behind. Back in the city, Nandor and Nadja track down Nadja's ghost and Nadja reconciles with the ghost, who transfers back into her doll body and agrees to return to the vampires' house.
28	8	"The Wellness Center"	Yana Gorskaya	Stefani Robinson	October 14, 2021	XWS03008	0.287
The time comes for Nandor's annual "Accession Day" party, celebrating the anniversary of his becoming the Supreme Viceroy of his home country. Guillermo and the other vampires are all excited for the party, but they are dismayed to discover that Nandor has fallen into a bout of depression, which happens to many vampires due to the nature of their eternal lifespans. In an attempt to lift his spirits, Nadja convinces Nandor to get out of the house by sending him on a Vampiric Council errand to collect some overdue bills from a vampire named Jan, who runs a wellness center for other vampires. To Nandor's surprise, he learns that Jan and all the other vampires at the wellness center have removed their own fangs and claim to no longer be vampires. Jan claims that she and her followers (known as "the Formerly Fanged") are in the process of becoming human again, and offers to help Nandor do the same: he accepts, and decides to move out of the vampires' house. Guillermo pleads for Nandor to make him a vampire if he is going to leave, but Nandor reveals that he views vampirism as a curse and cares too much about Guillermo to subject him to it. One month later, Guillermo and the vampires are adjusting to life without Nandor, while Nandor is living as a human in the wellness center. Concerned about Nandor, Guillermo visits the wellness center to check on him; unfortunately, Jan discovers his presence and orders her followers to kill him. Guillermo is able to fight his way out and escapes with Nandor, taking him back to the vampires' house and locking him up in the basement so that Guillermo and the other vampires can "deprogram" him and undo Jan's brainwashing. Back at the wellness center, Jan's followers begin to lose faith in her due to Guillermo's attack, so she convinces them all to expose themselves to sunlight as the "final step" in rejecting vampirism, but the sunlight kills them all as Jan reveals that she still has her vampire powers and prepares to start recruiting again.
29	9	"A Farewell"	Tig Fong	Sam Johnson & Stefani Robinson & Marika Sawyer & Paul Simms	October 21, 2021	XWS03009	0.272
Nandor recovers from Jan's brainwashing, but is still furious at the others and berates them for the roles they have played in causing his depression. He then decides to enter a "Super Slumber", the vampire equivalent of hibernation, which can last for hundreds of years. Nadja, Laszlo and Guillermo are horrified, while Colin Robinson is more upset because he believes Nandor is doing it to get out of attending his 100th birthday party. Nandor enters his Super Slumber shortly before the Guide arrives with a message from the Supreme Vampiric Council, informing the others that a delegation of vampires from the Old World will be arriving that night to inspect the progress that they have made. Since the delegates will be expecting to meet with both Nadja and Nandor, they are forced to awaken Nandor early, but he refuses to participate. When the delegates arrive, at Nandor's suggestion, Nadja claims that she killed him to become the sole leader of the local Council, but the delegates still insist on seeing Nandor's body for themselves. Guillermo is able to warn Nandor ahead of time, so he pretends to be dead when the delegates come in to examine him. Nandor goes back to sleep, while Laszlo annoys Nadja by insisting on making a lengthy speech for Colin Robinson's birthday. In private, Laszlo tells Nadja and Guillermo that the reason he has been so dedicated to celebrating Colin Robinson's birthday is because while he and Colin Robinson were researching energy vampires, he discovered that energy vampires have a life expectancy of exactly 100 years, meaning that Colin Robinson will die that night. Sure enough, Colin Robinson begins to feel sick and weak, so Guillermo, Laszlo and Nadja join him in the basement and wait for him to pass on. Guillermo wakes Nandor up again, wanting him to be present. Colin Robinson seemingly dies, but Nandor does not believe it, pointing out that Colin Robinson has faked his own death on numerous occasions. He tries to wake Colin Robinson up, but accidentally crushes his head in the process.
30	10	"The Portrait"	Yana Gorskaya	Sam Johnson & Stefani Robinson & Paul Simms & Lauren Wells	October 28, 2021	XWS03010	0.375
As part of their mourning process for Colin Robinson, the vampires commission a group portrait of Nandor, Nadja, Laszlo, Guillermo, Nadja's ghost, the Guide, the Baron, the Sire, and the hellhound. Guillermo tries to persuade the vampires to work through their grief in a healthier manner, but instead Nandor decides to leave Staten Island and travel the world in hopes of making a fresh start. Guillermo goes to Nadja for help, but she reveals that she has received an invitation from Viago to move to London and join the Supreme Vampiric Council, but she feels that while she wants to move there, she cannot go because Laszlo has vowed never to go back to England, due to his being expelled from a prestigious high-society group called the Sherwood Club. Laszlo reveals that the reason why he refuses to return to England is because he was expelled from the Sherwood Club for falling in love with Nadja, due to her perceived low social standing; however, he changes his mind upon discovering that Nadja could join the Supreme Vampiric Council, which would elevate them to the top of the social hierarchy. Guillermo is distraught and angrily confronts Nandor, resulting in a fight between them. Nandor reveals that the fight was a test, and offers to take Guillermo with him on his trip and to make him a vampire once they reach Nandor's ancestral homeland. Guillermo happily accepts and helps the vampires pack up their belongings. Nadja and Laszlo prepare to leave on a ship for England: Nadja is sealed into her coffin for the trip without incident, but Laszlo suddenly locks Guillermo in his coffin instead of entering it himself. Nandor waits at the train station for Guillermo, but is forced to depart alone when he does not show up, while Guillermo and Nadja are loaded onto the ship bound for London. In a letter to Nadja, Laszlo explains that he must stay behind on Staten Island for now, as he's discovered that a baby boy resembling Colin Robinson has burst out of Colin Robinson's dead body.

=== Season 4 (2022) ===
No. overall	No. in season	Title	Directed by	Written by	Original release date	Prod. code	U.S. viewers (millions)
31	1	"Reunited"	Yana Gorskaya	Stefani Robinson & Paul Simms	July 12, 2022	XWS04001	0.504
A year after the group has separated, Laszlo is revealed to be living with Baby Colin (whom Laszlo refers to as Boy, as he does not see him as Colin Robinson), when he is reunited with Nadja and Nandor, both of whom have returned from their international trips. While the group talks about the house being in disrepair, Nadja is reminded that Guillermo is in one of the crates that she sent beforehand back to the U.S., which Guillermo has been stuck in for a week. Guillermo is upset, and has started to think he should prioritize himself above the vampires, but this plan is impeded when Nandor asks him to be his best man at his future wedding and he learns how unsafe the house is for Baby Colin. Nadja comes up with an idea to start a vampire nightclub to get the money to fix the house, while Guillermo decides to stay with the vampires until Nandor gets married and Baby Colin can be raised safely.
32	2	"The Lamp"	Yana Gorskaya	Wally Baram & Aasia LaShay Bullock	July 12, 2022	XWS04002	0.385
Nandor reveals that he has been keeping treasures from his old village in the basement, which he hopes will impress future women. When Guillermo learns about the treasure, they discover a Djinn (Anoop Desai) in a genie lamp, who gives Nandor 52 wishes. Using the Djinn's power, Nandor decides to resurrect his 37 deceased wives so he can decide which he will remarry. Meanwhile, Nadja and Laszlo try to remake the old Vampiric Council facility into the nightclub, but the Guide is very resistant to their plans. Laszlo tries to use his psychology skills to discover why the Guide is afraid of change, and they discover that her current position is actually a punishment for her past reckless behavior as a vampire (including sleeping with Van Helsing, which explains her current attraction to Guillermo). Laszlo and Nadja ask Guillermo to seduce the Guide and convince her to support the nightclub's construction, which Guillermo agrees to as long as he gets to be the nightclub's accountant. The Guide ultimately agrees to help build the nightclub, but decides that she would rather just be friends with Guillermo. Meanwhile, Nandor has finally picked a wife for himself: Marwa (Parisa Fakhri).
33	3	"The Grand Opening"	Kyle Newacheck	Sam Johnson & Chris Marcil	July 19, 2022	XWS04003	0.234
The vampire nightclub is ready for its grand opening, and Nadja has invited famous vampire rapper Richie Suck (Affion Crockett) to perform for its first night, but Richie's controlling human familiar/manager Tom (Fred Armisen) refuses to let him perform. Baby Colin is rapidly growing and has now started his own Lego-based YouTube channel, while Guillermo and Laszlo bicker over his love of musical theatre until Laszlo accepts that he cannot change Baby Colin's interests. Meanwhile, Nandor worries that he may not be good enough for Marwa, so he decides to use one of his remaining wishes to obtain the world's largest penis. Guillermo helps him to work out the best possible phrasing of the wish, but due to Nandor's thanking Guillermo for his help while making the wish, the Djinn tricks them by adding an extra element to the wish that forces Nandor to think about Guillermo every time he engages in sex. At the nightclub opening, Nadja convinces Richie to kill Tom and return to his own style of performance, but this backfires when Richie reveals that he has recently developed a passion for stand-up comedy instead of singing. The attending crowd of vampires almost become violent, but Baby Colin defuses the situation by singing in Richie's place. Since Vampires share a love of child novelty acts, the nightclub opening is a massive success.
34	4	"The Night Market"	Yana Gorskaya	William Meny & Paul Simms	July 26, 2022	XWS04004	0.339
Business at the vampire nightclub is going well thanks to Baby Colin's performances, but Nadja encounters a new problem when the nightclub's wraith workers decide to form a labor union. To try and solve the problem, she organizes a trip to the Night Market, a secret marketplace used by many types of supernatural creatures. While Nadja searches for a product that can help her deal with the wraiths, Laszlo takes the opportunity to educate Baby Colin on the ways of different supernatural cultures, and Nandor accidentally volunteers Guillermo to take part in a series of fights against other vampires' familiars. Guillermo wins all of the fights easily, but irritates the crowd by refusing to harm any of the other familiars. His last opponent is a powerful vampire, but Nandor steps in and volunteers to fight Guillermo himself instead, thereby protecting Guillermo from either dying or publicly killing a vampire. After a lengthy fight, Guillermo devises a plan for them to escape, and Nandor pretends to snap his neck so the match can end without either of them dying. Nadja succeeds in purchasing a substance known as "water lily of the Nile", a powerful narcotic for wraiths, and uses it as leverage to bribe the wraiths' union leader, Xerxes; however, the other wraiths then kill him, so she reluctantly agrees to improve their working conditions.
35	5	"Private School"	Kyle Newacheck	Ayo Edebiri & Shana Gohd	August 2, 2022	XWS04005	0.391
Baby Colin is still growing quickly, and has begun wreaking havoc around the house. Guillermo suggests that they could solve the problem by enrolling him in school, so he can spend time with people his own age. The vampires' neighbor Sean recommends the private school that he went to, and arranges for them to have a meeting with the school's headmaster. After a lengthy interview process, in which the vampires repeatedly use their hypnosis to imitate a wide variety of family dynamics in the hopes of convincing the headmaster to accept Baby Colin into the school, they are ultimately successful. Guillermo is able to obtain a fake transcript for Baby Colin, but it's also revealed that he has been embezzling some of the nightclub's profits to help his family. The headmaster dies of a stroke due to having been hypnotized too many times, so Baby Colin is not accepted into the private school; instead, the vampires enroll him in a number of different local children's sports teams, as another way of giving him the social enrichment that he needs. Meanwhile, Nandor has been using some of the Djinn's wishes to try and improve his physical appearance so he can be more worthy of Marwa, but he ultimately decides that these alterations are pointless and uses another wish to revert his appearance back to normal.
36	6	"The Wedding"	Tig Fong	Sam Johnson & Sarah Naftalis & Marika Sawyer & Paul Simms	August 9, 2022	XWS04009	0.372
Nandor and Marwa's wedding is approaching, but Nandor is nervous and convinced that somebody is trying to sabotage the wedding. Guillermo has tried to help as a best man, but has not slept for a week so Nadja and The Guide offer to help. They tell Nandor that his demands are too much so Nandor uses his three last wishes to fix the rest: restore the Baron's old body so that he can officiate the wedding; bring back a dodo bird to life so that the Wraiths can eat it at the wedding; and make Marwa like all the things that Nandor likes. Guillermo encounters his vampire friend Derek, who is now working at a convenience store, and invites him to the wedding. At the wedding, when the Baron starts his marriage liturgy, many people state reasons why they don't think Nandor and Marwa should get married. After an hour of this, Marwa admits that she had her own doubts and was thinking of cancelling the wedding, but decided to go through with it because she "likes what Nandor likes." At the wedding reception, Nandor receives a miniature lamp from the Djinn as a gift, which only has three wishes. Nandor, uncomfortable with the fact that his wish changed Marwa's will, goes to see a sleeping Guillermo and covers him with a jacket.
37	7	"Pine Barrens"	Kyle Newacheck	Sarah Naftalis	August 16, 2022	XWS04006	0.305
Sean invites Laszlo, Nandor, and Baby Colin to join him for a "guys' weekend" at his hunting cabin in the New Jersey Pine Barrens. Unfortunately, this is complicated by the fact that Nandor and Laszlo have been bickering a lot recently. Their arguing eventually escalates to a fight, but they manage to reconcile after admitting that they've both missed spending time together. Sean is attacked by the Jersey Devil, but Baby Colin distracts it by playing Bon Jovi music, allowing Laszlo and Nandor to kill it. Meanwhile, Nadja and Guillermo plan to spend the weekend in their own ways: Nadja has a girls' night with her doll, Marwa, and the Guide, while Guillermo invites his family over for dinner. Guillermo and Nadja pretend to be a couple to prevent his family from noticing anything odd, but things take a dangerous turn when Nadja's presence awakens the vampire-hunting instincts in Guillermo's relatives. While trying to protect Nadja, Guillermo admits that he wants to become a vampire and tells them that he is gay. Nadja hypnotizes Guillermo's family to forget about everything relating to the vampires, but ensures that they remember Guillermo's coming out, as they were fully supportive of him.
38	8	"Go Flip Yourself"	Yana Gorskaya	Marika Sawyer	August 23, 2022	XWS04007	0.287
In an attempt to finally get the vampires' mansion fixed, Laszlo signs the house up for an episode of Go Flip Yourself, a home-renovation show run by twin brothers Bran and Toby Daltry, in the hopes that they can rebuild the mansion. Nadja kills Toby when the brothers first enter the house, but the vampires hypnotize Bran and the rest of the crew to believe that he's just sick. Despite Guillermo's misgivings, the vampires agree to have the house renovated, and assist Bran's crew with their work. When the time comes to reveal the results, however, the vampires are surprised and annoyed to discover that except for adding a couple of new rooms, Bran and his crew haven't changed anything about the rest of the house. Bran then reveals himself as Simon the Devious, and explains that he and his vampire followers created Go Flip Yourself as a front just so he could eventually access the vampires' house and steal Laszlo's cursed witch-skin hat again, while Toby was just a regular human who Simon/Bran had been using as a cover. Simon and his crew escape with the hat, but the removal of the hat's curse does slightly improve the conditions in the rest of the mansion. As Simon is filming his next episode at another house, the hat's curse causes a gas explosion which destroys that house.
39	9	"Freddie"	DJ Stipsen	Jake Bender & Zach Dunn	August 30, 2022	XWS04008	0.356
The nightclub has continued to do well, even attracting some human celebrities as well as vampires. However, Nadja hits a snag when Laszlo insists on drawing up a contract for Baby Colin's continued performances. When Nadja refuses to sign the contract, Laszlo removes Baby Colin from the nightclub and takes him on tour, causing the club's profits to drop. Nadja attempts to find a replacement for Baby Colin, without success, while Baby Colin's tour ends badly when he suddenly grows into puberty. Meanwhile, Guillermo reveals that he started a relationship with a man named Freddie during his time in England, and invites Freddie to come and visit him for a weekend. Nandor develops a crush on Freddie, but he doesn't want to cheat on Marwa, so he uses one of the Djinn's three wishes to transform her into an exact copy of Freddie. Both couples spend the weekend wandering around New York, until Guillermo and the real Freddie discover what's happened. Nandor uses hypnosis to calm the two Freddies down, but Guillermo is still angered by his trick. Freddie returns to England, leaving Guillermo downhearted. Remorseful over his actions, Nandor sends Marwa-Freddie off to follow his dream of traveling the world. Guillermo takes a trip to London so he can visit Freddie, but is heartbroken when he discovers that Freddie and Marwa-Freddie are now in a relationship.
40	10	"Sunrise, Sunset"	Kyle Newacheck	Paul Simms	September 6, 2022	XWS04010	0.388
Baby Colin has fully grown into an adult body, but he hasn't mentally matured yet and is behaving rebelliously, leaving Laszlo and Guillermo unsure of how to help him. They eventually deduce that he is an energy vampire like the original Colin Robinson, so Laszlo tells Baby Colin about his origins and his true nature as an energy vampire. Meanwhile, Nadja and the Guide are struggling to keep the nightclub running, since Baby Colin was its main attraction. Running out of options (including resurrecting famous historical figures to host Q&A sessions), Nadja attempts to burn down the nightclub, but the club's blood sprinklers mean that only her office is burned, destroying the money that she had been hiding there, while it's also revealed that the club has no insurance. Baby Colin continues smashing holes in the walls of his old room, until he finds a series of clues that lead him to a secret room hidden behind one of the walls, which is full of old diaries and clothes that were left behind by the original Colin Robinson. Baby Colin reads all of the diaries, which causes him to regain the appearance and memories of the original Colin Robinson. Since the original Colin Robinson was in charge of the vampires' bank accounts, this means that they can finally get the money they need to repair the house; however, Colin Robinson has forgotten the year that he lived as "Baby Colin", saddening Laszlo. With Marwa gone and Baby Colin grown up, Guillermo finds himself disillusioned with his life as a familiar. After talking with Nandor and realizing that life in the vampires' house is never really going to change, he decides to leave, taking all the money that he had embezzled from the club. He visits Derek at the convenience store, gives him a suitcase full of money, and asks Derek to turn him into a vampire.

=== Season 5 (2023) ===
No. overall	No. in season	Title	Directed by	Written by	Original release date	Prod. code	U.S. viewers (millions)
41	1	"The Mall"	Yana Gorskaya	Marika Sawyer	July 13, 2023	XWS05001	0.326
The vampires try to lift Guillermo's spirits, unaware that he asked Derek to turn him into a vampire.
42	2	"A Night Out with the Guys"	Kyle Newacheck	Paul Simms	July 13, 2023	XWS05002	0.284
Nandor and Laszlo go out with Sean and his friends, while the Guide helps Nadja with a possible curse.
43	3	"Pride Parade"	Yana Gorskaya	Jake Bender & Zach Dunn	July 20, 2023	XWS05003	0.251
The vampires help Sean with organizing a pride parade, while Nadja helps her ghost in achieving a dream.
44	4	"The Campaign"	Yana Gorskaya	Max Brockman & Shana Gohd	July 27, 2023	XWS05004	0.268
Colin Robinson runs for comptroller and reconnects with Evie. Meanwhile, Nandor makes a new friend at the gym, and Laszlo tries to impress Nadja's new friends.
45	5	"Local News"	Yana Gorskaya	Sarah Naftalis	August 3, 2023	XWS05005	0.284
Nandor believes he might have exposed the vampires' nature on live television, while Guillermo visits his family to talk about new changes.
46	6	"Urgent Care"	Yana Gorskaya	Sam Johnson & Chris Marcil	August 10, 2023	XWS05006	0.267
Guillermo is taken to the hospital when he breaks his foot, while Colin Robinson starts losing energy.
47	7	"Hybrid Creatures"	Kyle Newacheck	Jeremy Levick & Rajat Suresh	August 17, 2023	XWS05007	0.350
Laszlo mixes Guillermo's DNA with stray animals, creating hybrids. Meanwhile, Nadja tries to end her curse, while Nandor and Colin Robinson teach at night school.
48	8	"The Roast"	Tig Fong	Sarah Naftalis & Lauren Wells	August 24, 2023	XWS05008	0.291
The vampires decide to throw a roast for Laszlo, who appears to be depressive.
49	9	"A Weekend at Morrigan Manor"	Kyle Newacheck	William Meny & Paul Simms	August 31, 2023	XWS05009	0.239
The vampires visit a wealthy vampire's manor, where they experience strange events.
50	10	"Exit Interview"	Tig Fong	Jake Bender & Zach Dunn & Sam Johnson & Sarah Naftalis & Paul Simms	August 31, 2023	XWS05010	0.194
Guillermo flees from an irate Nandor, who intends to kill him for getting Derek to turn him into a vampire.

=== Season 6 (2024) ===
No. overall	No. in season	Title	Directed by	Written by	Original release date	Prod. code	U.S. viewers (millions)
51	1	"The Return of Jerry"	Kyle Newacheck	Paul Simms	October 21, 2024	XWS06001	0.170
With Guillermo no longer Nandor's familiar and his room in the basement vacant, the vampires awaken Jerry, their fifth housemate, from his super slumber, having completely forgotten to rouse him back in 1996. Jerry is startled to learn that his fellow vampires have not only failed to conquer the New World in the half century he has been asleep, but also that there is a human camera crew in the house. The vampires cannot recall why on earth they have allowed humans into their lives to document every move, so reluctantly seek out Guillermo for an answer. It turns out Guillermo has been living in the garden shed for the past few months. Jerry makes it clear that the vampires seem to have lost their way. He reminds Laszlo and Nadja that the pair had not been on speaking terms with each other for five years when he went to sleep. When the couple remember this, the original argument is resurrected. The surfeit of bad energy now in the house leads to Colin Robinson gaining a lot of weight without even feasting. It takes Guillermo to point out that Jerry is affecting the group's dynamic and he reluctantly agrees to help get rid of him. They take Jerry to Vampiric Council headquarters where The Guide thinks he may be the chosen one.
52	2	"Headhunting"	Kyle Newacheck	Jake Bender & Zach Dunn & Sam Johnson & Sarah Naftalis	October 21, 2024	XWS06002	0.130
Laszlo recommences his experiments to resurrect dead humans like Dr. Frankenstein but is lacking a human head. It turns out Colin Robinson has a job as a ride-share driver and the pair go out looking for a suitable victim. Guillermo lands a new job in the mail room at a Manhattan private equity firm named Cannon Capital Strategies - a step up from his current position at Panera Bread. When the documentary crew turn up at his new place of work, he is none too pleased. Nadja and Nandor get jobs at the firm to keep an eye on Guillermo's progress, fearing that if he doesn't excel at his new job, he will blame the vampires and kill them all. Guillermo's rapid rise through the ranks to position of analyst is largely due to Nadja's interventions. Having acquired a head, Laszlo successfully reanimates his monster only to be reminded why he had abandoned the project for so long: the violent disposition displayed by the monster. Colin Robinson picks up the project and is successful in finding a solution that has so long eluded Laszlo.
53	3	"Sleep Hypnosis"	Yana Gorskaya	Marika Sawyer	October 21, 2024	XWS06003	N/A
A disagreement over the use of Guillermo's old room sees the vampires bickering once again. Colin Robinson comes to the realization that he no longer holds the casting vote in such disputes as it is now simply Nadja and Laszlo versus Nandor. Fearing that he may be soon made homeless, Colin Robinson tries to convince Guillermo to return to the household. When the former familiar declines, Colin Robinson hypnotizes Nandor while asleep, resulting in the latter returning to his dominant and assertive Nandor the Relentless persona and a burnt out house. Nadja, learning of the sleep hypnosis attempts the technique on Laszlo in order to get him to be tidier. Colin Robinson then hypnotizes Nandor into the persona of Richard Nixon. When Laszlo learns of sleep hypnosis he immediately turns all his fellow vampires into his servants. Guillermo seeks help from the Baron whose hypnosis spell makes the vampires forget they even know each other. It takes The Guide to undo all the hypnotic suggestions, but unfortunately Guillermo listens to the Baron's hypnosis message and it wipes his memory.
54	4	"The Railroad"	Kyle Newacheck	Sam Johnson & Chris Marcil	October 28, 2024	XWS06004	0.131
Nadja is enjoying her job at Cannon Capital Strategies, as is Nandor. When Guillermo is asked to dismiss Nandor, he tries to avoid firing his old boss as long as possible. Laszlo's best friend Sean Rinaldi pays an unexpected visit to ask if there are any openings at the railroad where he thinks the vampires work. To maintain their cover story, Laszlo and Colin Robinson set up a fake office, hiring actors as staff, just so they can give Sean an interview. They use the monster as the interviewer, who is so impressed by Sean that he gives him a job as a vice president. Meanwhile, Nadja tired of being overlooked at work and looked down on by Guillermo, convinces Cannon Capital Strategies to take a look at the railroad company. They realize it is all fake, but sense an opportunity in the office building which they feel is undervalued. Sean is informed that the railroad company has gone bust and he is once again out of a job.
55	5	"Nandor's Army"	Yana Gorskaya	Sarah Naftalis	November 4, 2024	XWS06005	0.183
Humiliated at being fired by Guillermo, Nandor has disappeared. The Baron has a lead in the form of a radio recording of Nandor. Fearing that Nandor is drawing too much attention, the Baron declares that he must be stopped and asks the vampires to go to the source of the broadcasts in New Hampshire to retrieve the wayward warrior. It seems that Nandor has lost his grip on reality and raised an army of mannequins in an attempt to overthrow Canon Capital Strategies. His fellow vampires enlist in the army but fail to make Nandor see sense. After a heart to heart with Guillermo and just when it seems that Nandor is agreeable to returning home, he is distracted by a firework display, mistaking it for an attack. Nadja uses the opportunity to bind him in chains and vampires set off for home. En route they are caught up by Nandor's real army and he instructs them to wreak havoc on Dartmouth College.
56	6	"Laszlo's Father"	Yana Gorskaya	Jake Bender & Zach Dunn	November 11, 2024	XWS06006	0.187
When Nandor sets ablaze a pair of curtains, he is surprised to discover a window behind them. Looking through the window he realizes he has another set of neighbors and commences spying on them. Confused by the ever changing residents, Nandor and Nadja come to the conclusion that the house is inhabited by shapeshifters when in fact it is just an Airbnb. When Nadja summons the ghost of Laszlo's father, Lord Roderick Cravensworth (Steve Coogan), he reveals his unfinished business is to repair his relationship with his son. Laszlo is not convinced and is suspicious about his father's real motives but gives him a second chance. He is right to be cautious though as his father tries to possess his body by use of a spell. Meanwhile Nandor and Nadja plan to capture and destroy the shapeshifters. Nadja sets off to infiltrate the property, but when she returns from the house, she and Nandor accuse each other of being shapeshifters in disguise
57	7	"March Madness"	Yana Gorskaya	Jeremy Levick & Rajat Suresh	November 18, 2024	XWS06007	0.201
Laszlo and Nandor find Sean in the throes of March Madness and incorrectly conclude he has been possessed by demonic forces. They enlist the help of The Guide to summon a bigger demon in order to rid Sean of his. The summoned demon appears overly interested in college basketball. When he reveals to Sean that his favored team will lose, Sean has a heart attack and is taken to the ER. While consoling Sean's wife Charmaine, Nandor indicates his growing feelings for The Guide. With Nadja self-declaring herself as the office funny girl, Guillermo worries he doesn't have an office persona. Colin Robinson offers his assistance and turns up at the office to help with the identity crisis only to make things worse by repeatedly assaulting Guillermo. Promising his boss not to take it any further and keep their discussion on the matter a secret, Guillermo is given the moniker of "The Vault".
58	8	"P.I. Undercover: New York"	Kyle Newacheck	Max Brockman	November 25, 2024	XWS06008	0.178
A police drama is being filmed on the street outside the vampires' home. Laszlo and Nandor seek to interrupt the shoot; Guillermo however is a huge fan of the show. Colin Robinson visits his old friend Joel with Nadja, but Joel's wife Becky wants to sleep with Colin Robinson and the evening goes poorly.
59	9	"Come Out and Play"	DJ Stipsen	Shana Gohd & Paul Simms	December 2, 2024	XWS06009	0.149
The vampires attend an event for The Baron that goes awry, causing a vampire manhunt for Nandor, Colin Robinson, Laszlo, Nadja, and The Guide. The Staten Island vampires fend off other clans while moving through the city, as they wait for Guillermo to rescue them. Guillermo reunites with his cousin, Miguel.
60	10	"The Promotion"	Kyle Newacheck	Jake Bender & Zach Dunn & Amelia Haller & William Meny & Lauren Wells	December 9, 2024	XWS06010	0.151
Guillermo quits Cannon Capital after Jordan doesn't promote him, and Nadja quits as well thinking a scam is a new job. The monster rejects Laszlo and declares himself Colin Robinson's monster. Guillermo and Nandor form a new partnership to fight injustice.
61	11	"The Finale"	Yana Gorskaya	Sam Johnson & Sarah Naftalis & Paul Simms	December 16, 2024	XWS06011	0.190
The film crew announces they have enough footage for their documentary and will stop filming. Nadja hypnotizes the audience into seeing whatever ending they want to, and three endings parodying other media are shown.

== Production ==
=== Development ===
Promotional poster for the first season.

On January 22, 2018, it was announced that FX had given the production a pilot order. The pilot was written by Jemaine Clement and directed by Taika Waititi, both of whom are also executive producers alongside Scott Rudin, Paul Simms, Garrett Basch, and Eli Bush. On May 3, 2018, it was announced that FX had given the production a series order for a first season consisting of ten episodes, which premiered on March 27, 2019.

According to Clement: "We stay pretty basic '70s/'80s vampire rules, with a little bit of '30s. They can turn into bats. They can't go in the sunlight; they don't sparkle in the sun, they die. They have to be invited in; in a lot of literature vampires have to be invited into private buildings, but this is a documentary so it's the real rules which means they have to be invited into any building." Clement has also stated that the part of Laszlo was written specifically for Berry. The main influences on the series are Fright Night, Martin, The Lost Boys, Nosferatu, Interview with the Vampire, Vampire's Kiss, and Bram Stoker's Dracula. The character Nadja was named after the 1994 film of the same name.

The song used in the opening credits is "You're Dead" by Norma Tanega (1966), which was used during the opening credits sequence in the original film.

The second season premiered on April 15, 2020. On May 22, 2020, FX renewed the series for a third season, which premiered on September 2, 2021. On August 13, 2021, FX renewed the series for a fourth season, ahead of the third-season premiere. Upon the fourth season's renewal, it was reported that Rudin would no longer be an executive producer, beginning with the third season, due to allegations of abusive behavior. On June 6, 2022, FX renewed the series for a fifth and sixth season, ahead of the fourth season premiere. On December 19, 2023, it was announced that the sixth season would be its last.

=== Filming ===
Principal photography for the first season took place from October 22 to December 18, 2018, in Toronto, Ontario. Filming for the third season began on February 8, 2021, and finished on May 3, 2021.

The writer/producer Paul Simms said that series does not use CGI effects: "There's no fully digital characters or anything like that. One of the movies we really talked about a lot when we were conceiving the show was Francis Ford Coppola's Dracula where he went back to really doing as many effects as possible in camera and figuring out ways to do that. One of my favorite supernatural moments is completely in camera. It's where Beanie Feldstein's character is walking along in the park and Nadja appears walking next to her. That was all just done completely the old fashioned way where Natasia was hiding behind a tree and the camera was tracking along and at the right moment, she walked out from behind a tree. I think there's something about that old fashioned way that makes things more interesting than when you can tell it's digital and rubbery and fake looking".

Among the cinematographers D.J. Stipsen and Christian Sprenger's influences for the series was the work of Michael Ballhaus and production designer Thomas E. Sanders on the Coppola-directed Bram Stoker's Dracula: "We referenced that film for the general sumptuousness of the vampires' mansion, which was our main set. Our take, however, was that the Staten Island vampires have let their place go. The former glory is evident but now exists in a worn, faded and distressed state. Production designer Kate Bunch and I had a lot of conversations about striking the right balance between sumptuousness and neglect. There are strong reds, but also yellow that has faded to the point of being a warm brown."

Filming for the sixth and final season concluded in May 2024.

== Release ==
=== Marketing ===
On October 31, 2018, a series of teaser trailers for the series were released. On January 10, 2019, another teaser trailer was released. On February 4, 2019, the official trailer for the series was released.

=== Premiere ===
On October 7, 2018, the series held a panel at the annual New York Comic Con moderated by Rolling Stone's Alan Sepinwall and featuring co-creators Taika Waititi and Jemaine Clement, along with fellow executive producer Paul Simms. Before the panel began, the first episode of the series was screened for the audience. The world premiere for the series was screened during the 2019 South by Southwest film festival in Austin, Texas as a part of the festival's "Episodic Premieres" series.

== Reception ==
=== Critical response ===
Critical response of What We Do in the Shadows
Season	Rotten Tomatoes	Metacritic
1	94% (72 reviews)	80 (30 reviews)
2	98% (44 reviews)	79 (11 reviews)
3	100% (28 reviews)	96 (11 reviews)
4	100% (29 reviews)	84 (8 reviews)
5	95% (35 reviews)	85 (11 reviews)
6	91% (23 reviews)	79 (8 reviews)

All six seasons of What We Do in the Shadows received critical acclaim. On the review aggregator website Rotten Tomatoes, the overall series holds a 96% approval rating. On Metacritic, which uses a weighted average, the overall series has received a score of 83 out of 100.

==== Season 1 ====
The first season received positive reviews. On Rotten Tomatoes, the first season has an approval rating of 94%, based on 72 reviews, with an average rating of 7.8/10. The website's critical consensus reads, "Delightfully absurd and ridiculously fun, What We Do in the Shadows expands on the film's vampiric lore and finds fresh perspective in its charming, off-kilter cast to create a mockumentary series worth sinking your teeth into." On Metacritic, it has a weighted average score of 80 out of 100, based on 30 critics, indicating "generally favorable" reviews.

==== Season 2 ====
The second season also received positive reviews. On Rotten Tomatoes, the second season has an approval rating of 98%, based on 44 reviews, with an average rating of 8.3/10. The website's critical consensus reads, "Bat! What We Do In the Shadows loses no steam in a smashing second season that savvily expands its supernatural horizons while doubling down on the fast flying fun." On Metacritic, it has a weighted average score of 79 out of 100, based on 11 critics, indicating "generally favorable" reviews.

==== Season 3 ====
The third season was also praised. On Rotten Tomatoes, it has an approval rating of 100%, based on 28 reviews, with an average rating of 9/10. The website's critical consensus reads, "Carried on the wings of its cast's incredible chemistry and the strongest writing of the series so far, What We Do in the Shadows' third season is scary good." On Metacritic, the third season has an average score of 96 out of 100, based on 11 critics, indicating "universal acclaim".

==== Season 4 ====
The fourth season also received acclaim from critics. On Rotten Tomatoes, it has an approval rating of 100%, based on 29 reviews, with an average rating of 8.6/10. The website's critical consensus reads, "Aside from turning this demonic household into Three Vampires and a Baby, What We Do in the Shadows doubles down on what it does best without drastically changing the formula – and remains fang-tastic all the same." On Metacritic, the fourth season has an average score of 84 out of 100, based on eight critics, indicating "universal acclaim". However, some critics complained of the reductive treatment of Nandor's wife, Marwa, in season 4. Comic Book Resources complained of the show "stripping a woman of her identity – physically and mentally – for laughs" and The Mary Sue stated that "What We Do in the Shadows missed hard with its treatment of Marwa."

==== Season 5 ====
The fifth season also received positive reviews. On Rotten Tomatoes, it has an approval rating of 95%, based on 35 reviews, with an average rating of 7.65/10. The site's critical consensus reads, "Displaying a comedic longevity that'd make even a vampire blush, What We Do in the Shadows enters its fifth season showing no signs of getting long in the fang." On Metacritic, the fifth season has an average score of 85 out of 100, based on 11 critics, indicating "universal acclaim".

==== Season 6 ====
The sixth season also received positive reviews. On Rotten Tomatoes, it has an approval rating of 91%, based on 23 reviews, with an average rating of 7.8/10. The site's critical consensus reads, "What We Do in the Shadows wisely chooses to stick a stake in it before the Staten Island shenanigans become stale, preserving its integrity as one of television's best sitcoms." On Metacritic, the sixth season has an average score of 79 out of 100, based on 8 critics, indicating "generally favorable reviews".

=== Ratings ===
Nielsen Media Research, which records streaming viewership on U.S. television screens, reported that from June 1, 2024, to May 31, 2025, What We Do in the Shadows was streamed for a total of 55.6 million hours.

==== Season 1 ====
Viewership and ratings per episode of What We Do in the Shadows
No.	Title	Air date	Rating (18–49)	Viewers (millions)	DVR (18–49)	DVR viewers (millions)	Total (18–49)	Total viewers (millions)
1	"Pilot"	March 27, 2019	0.2	0.617	0.4	0.938	0.6	1.556
2	"City Council"	April 3, 2019	0.3	0.658	0.2	0.599	0.5	1.257 (Note: Live +7 ratings were not available, so Live +3 ratings have been used instead.)
3	"Werewolf Feud"	April 10, 2019	0.1	0.305	0.3	0.637	0.4	0.943
4	"Manhattan Night Club"	April 17, 2019	0.2	0.439	0.3	0.699	0.5	1.139
5	"Animal Control"	April 24, 2019	0.1	0.320	0.3	0.700	0.4	1.021
6	"Baron's Night Out"	May 1, 2019	0.2	0.418	0.2	0.563	0.4	0.982
7	"The Trial"	May 8, 2019	0.2	0.527	0.4	0.709	0.6	1.237
8	"Citizenship"	May 15, 2019	0.2	0.522	0.3	0.636	0.5	1.159
9	"The Orgy"	May 22, 2019	0.2	0.434	0.3	0.727	0.5	1.162
10	"Ancestry"	May 29, 2019	0.2	0.427	0.3	0.676	0.5	1.104

==== Season 2 ====
Viewership and ratings per episode of What We Do in the Shadows
No.	Title	Air date	Rating (18–49)	Viewers (millions)	DVR (18–49)	DVR viewers (millions)	Total (18–49)	Total viewers (millions)
1	"Resurrection"	April 15, 2020	0.2	0.537	0.2	0.543	0.4	1.080
2	"Ghosts"	April 15, 2020	0.2	0.409	0.1	0.506	0.3	0.915
3	"Brain Scramblies"	April 22, 2020	0.2	0.566	0.2	0.520	0.4	1.086
4	"The Curse"	April 29, 2020	0.2	0.618	0.2	0.446	0.4	1.064
5	"Colin's Promotion"	May 6, 2020	0.2	0.378	0.2	0.545	0.4	0.923
6	"On the Run"	May 13, 2020	0.2	0.436	0.2	0.601	0.4	1.037
7	"The Return"	May 20, 2020	0.2	0.377	0.2	0.605	0.4	0.982
8	"Collaboration"	May 27, 2020	0.2	0.443	0.2	0.562	0.4	1.005
9	"Witches"	June 3, 2020	0.2	0.433	0.1	0.489	0.3	0.922
10	"Nouveau Théâtre des Vampires"	June 10, 2020	0.2	0.406	0.2	0.557	0.4	0.963

==== Season 3 ====
Viewership and ratings per episode of What We Do in the Shadows
No.	Title	Air date	Rating (18–49)	Viewers (millions)	DVR (18–49)	DVR viewers (millions)	Total (18–49)	Total viewers (millions)
1	"The Prisoner"	September 2, 2021	0.2	0.498	—N/a	—N/a	—N/a	—N/a
2	"The Cloak of Duplication"	September 2, 2021	0.2	0.448	—N/a	—N/a	—N/a	—N/a
3	"Gail"	September 9, 2021	0.1	0.311	—N/a	—N/a	—N/a	—N/a
4	"The Casino"	September 16, 2021	0.1	0.462	—N/a	—N/a	—N/a	—N/a
5	"The Chamber of Judgement"	September 23, 2021	0.1	0.399	—N/a	—N/a	—N/a	—N/a
6	"The Escape"	September 30, 2021	0.2	0.416	—N/a	—N/a	—N/a	—N/a
7	"The Siren"	October 7, 2021	0.2	0.326	—N/a	—N/a	—N/a	—N/a
8	"The Wellness Center"	October 14, 2021	0.1	0.287	0.2	0.490	0.3	0.777
9	"A Farewell"	October 21, 2021	0.1	0.272	0.2	0.540	0.3	0.812
10	"The Portrait"	October 28, 2021	0.2	0.375	—N/a	—N/a	—N/a	—N/a

=== Accolades ===
Year	Award	Category	Nominee(s)	Result	Ref.
2019	Primetime Creative Arts Emmy Awards	Outstanding Cinematography for a Single-Camera Series (Half-Hour)	DJ Stipsen (for "Manhattan Night Club")	Nominated	
2019	Primetime Creative Arts Emmy Awards	Outstanding Sound Editing for a Comedy or Drama Series (Half-Hour) and Animation	David Barbee, Angelina Faulkner, Steve Griffen, Sam Lewis, John Guentner, and Ginger Geary (for "Werewolf Feud")	Nominated	
2019	Saturn Awards	Best Horror Television Series	What We Do in the Shadows	Nominated	
2019	TCA Awards	Outstanding New Program	What We Do in the Shadows	Nominated	
2020	Hollywood Critics Association Midseason Awards	Best Cable Network Series (New or Recurring)	What We Do in the Shadows	Won	
2020	Primetime Emmy Awards	Outstanding Comedy Series	Jemaine Clement, Taika Waititi, Paul Simms, Scott Rudin, Garrett Basch, Eli Bush, Stefani Robinson, Sam Johnson, and Derek S. Rappaport	Nominated	
2020	Primetime Emmy Awards	Outstanding Writing for a Comedy Series	Sam Johnson and Chris Marcil (for "Collaboration")	Nominated	
2020	Primetime Emmy Awards	Outstanding Writing for a Comedy Series	Stefani Robinson (for "On the Run")	Nominated	
2020	Primetime Emmy Awards	Outstanding Writing for a Comedy Series	Paul Simms (for "Ghosts")	Nominated	
2020	Primetime Creative Arts Emmy Awards	Outstanding Casting for a Comedy Series	Gayle Keller, Jenny Lewis, Sara Kay	Nominated	
2020	Primetime Creative Arts Emmy Awards	Outstanding Single-Camera Picture Editing for a Comedy Series	Yana Gorskaya and Dane McMaster (for "Resurrection")	Nominated	
2020	Primetime Creative Arts Emmy Awards	Outstanding Production Design for a Narrative Program (Half-Hour)	Kate Bunch, Aleks Cameron, and Shayne Fox (for "Resurrection", "Collaboration", "Witches")	Nominated	
2020	Primetime Creative Arts Emmy Awards	Outstanding Sound Editing for a Comedy or Drama Series (Half-Hour) and Animation	Steffan Falesitch, David Barbee, Angelina Faulkner, Steve Griffen, Sam C. Lewis, John Guentner, and Ellen Heuer (for "The Return")	Nominated	
2020	TCA Awards	Outstanding Achievement in Comedy	What We Do in the Shadows	Nominated	
2020	Writers Guild of America Awards	New Series	Jesse Armstrong, Sam Bain, Jemaine Clement, Josh Lieb, Iain Morris, Stefani Robinson, Duncan Sarkies, Marika Sawyer, Tom Scharpling, Paul Simms, and Taika Waititi	Nominated	
2021	AACTA International Awards	Best Comedy Series	What We Do in the Shadows	Nominated	
2021	American Cinema Editors Awards	Best Edited Comedy Series for Commercial Television	Dane McMaster and Varun Viswanath (for "On the Run")	Nominated	
2021	American Cinema Editors Awards	Best Edited Comedy Series for Commercial Television	Yana Gorskaya and Dane McMaster (for "Resurrection")	Nominated	
2021	Art Directors Guild Awards	Excellence in Production Design for a Half Hour Single-Camera Television Series	Kate Bunch (for "Resurrection", "Collaboration" and "Witches")	Won	
2021	Casting Society of America	Television Series – Comedy	Gayle Keller, Jenny Lewis, Sara Kay, and Emer O'Callaghan	Won	
2021	Costume Designers Guild Awards	Excellence in Sci-Fi/Fantasy Television	Amanda Neale (for "Nouveau Théâtre des Vampires")	Nominated	
2021	Critics' Choice Super Awards	Best Science Fiction/Fantasy Series	What We Do in the Shadows	Nominated	
2021	Critics' Choice Super Awards	Best Actor in a Science Fiction/Fantasy Series	Kayvan Novak	Nominated	
2021	Critics' Choice Super Awards	Best Actress in a Science Fiction/Fantasy Series	Natasia Demetriou	Won	
2021	Critics' Choice Television Awards	Best Comedy Series	What We Do in the Shadows	Nominated	
2021	Critics' Choice Television Awards	Best Actor in a Comedy Series	Matt Berry	Nominated	
2021	Critics' Choice Television Awards	Best Actress in a Comedy Series	Natasia Demetriou	Nominated	
2021	Critics' Choice Television Awards	Best Supporting Actor in a Comedy Series	Harvey Guillén	Nominated	
2021	Critics' Choice Television Awards	Best Supporting Actor in a Comedy Series	Mark Proksch	Nominated	
2021	Producers Guild of America Awards	Danny Thomas Award for Outstanding Producer of Episodic Television – Comedy	Jemaine Clement, Taika Waititi, Paul Simms, Scott Rudin, Garrett Basch, Eli Bush, Stefani Robinson, Sam Johnson, Marika Sawyer, and Derek S. Rappaport	Nominated	
2021	Satellite Awards	Best Television Series – Musical or Comedy	What We Do in the Shadows	Nominated	
2021	Saturn Awards	Best Horror Television Series	What We Do in the Shadows	Nominated	
2021	Saturn Awards	Best Supporting Actress on Television	Natasia Demetriou	Nominated	
2021	Saturn Awards	Best Guest Performance on a Television Series	Mark Hamill	Nominated	
2021	Writers Guild of America Awards	Comedy Series	Jake Bender, Jemaine Clement, Zach Dunn, Joe Furey, Shana Gohd, Sam Johnson, Chris Marcil, William Meny, Sarah Naftalis, Stefani Robinson, Marika Sawyer, and Paul Simms	Nominated	
2022	Critics' Choice Television Awards	Best Comedy Series	What We Do in the Shadows	Nominated	
2022	Critics' Choice Television Awards	Best Actor in a Comedy Series	Kayvan Novak	Nominated	
2022	Critics' Choice Television Awards	Best Supporting Actor in a Comedy Series	Harvey Guillén	Nominated	
2022	Writers Guild of America Awards	Comedy Series	Jake Bender, Jemaine Clement, Zach Dunn, Shana Gohd, Sam Johnson, Chris Marcil, William Meny, Sarah Naftalis, Stefani Robinson, Marika Sawyer, Paul Simms, and Lauren Well	Nominated	
2022	Costume Designers Guild Awards	Excellence in Period Television	Laura Montgomery (for "The Wellness Centre")	Nominated	
2022	Costume Designers Guild Awards	Excellence in Sci-Fi/Fantasy Television	Laura Montgomery (for "Gail")	Nominated	
2022	Art Directors Guild Awards	Excellence in Production Design for a Half Hour Single-Camera Television Series	Kate Bunch (for "The Prisoner", "The Cloak of Duplication", "The Siren")	Won	
2022	Golden Reel Awards	Outstanding Achievement in Sound Editing – 1/2 Hour – Comedy or Drama	Steffan Falesitch, David Barbee, Chris Kahwaty, John Guentner, Sam Lewis, Ellen Heuer, and Steve Griffen (for "The Escape")	Nominated	
2022	Cinema Audio Society Awards	Outstanding Achievement in Sound Mixing for Television Series – Half Hour	Rob Beal, Diego Gat, Samuel Ejnes, Mike Tehrani, and Stacey Michaels (for "The Casino")	Nominated	
2022	Hollywood Critics Association TV Awards	Best Cable Series, Comedy	What We Do in the Shadows	Won	
2022	Hollywood Critics Association TV Awards	Best Actor in a Broadcast Network or Cable Series, Comedy	Kayvan Novak	Nominated	
2022	Hollywood Critics Association TV Awards	Best Actor in a Broadcast Network or Cable Series, Comedy	Matt Berry	Nominated	
2022	Hollywood Critics Association TV Awards	Best Actress in a Broadcast Network or Cable Series, Comedy	Natasia Demetriou	Nominated	
2022	Hollywood Critics Association TV Awards	Best Supporting Actor in a Broadcast Network or Cable Series, Comedy	Harvey Guillén	Nominated	
2022	Hollywood Critics Association TV Awards	Best Supporting Actress in a Broadcast Network or Cable Series, Comedy	Kristen Schaal	Nominated	
2022	Hollywood Critics Association TV Awards	Best Directing in a Broadcast Network or Cable Series, Comedy	Yana Gorskaya (for "The Wellness Center")	Nominated	
2022	Hollywood Critics Association TV Awards	Best Writing in a Broadcast Network or Cable Series, Comedy	Stefani Robinson (for "The Wellness Center")	Nominated	
2022	Primetime Emmy Awards	Outstanding Comedy Series	Jemaine Clement, Taika Waititi, Paul Simms, Garrett Basch, Eli Bush, Stefani Robinson, Sam Johnson, Yana Gorskaya, Kyle Newacheck, Marika Sawyer, Ingrid Lageder, and Derek S. Rappaport	Nominated	
2022	Primetime Emmy Awards	Outstanding Writing for a Comedy Series	Sarah Naftalis (for "The Casino")	Nominated	
2022	Primetime Emmy Awards	Outstanding Writing for a Comedy Series	Stefani Robinson (for "The Wellness Center")	Nominated	
2022	Primetime Creative Arts Emmy Awards	Outstanding Fantasy/Sci-Fi Costumes	Laura Montgomery, Judy Laukkanen, and Barbara Cardoso (for "The Wellness Center")	Won	
2022	Primetime Creative Arts Emmy Awards	Outstanding Sound Editing for a Comedy or Drama Series (Half-Hour) and Animation	Steffan Falesitch, Chris Kahwaty, David Barbee, John Guentner, Sam Lewis, Steve Griffen, and Ellen Heuer (for "The Escape")	Nominated	
2022	Primetime Creative Arts Emmy Awards	Outstanding Sound Mixing for a Comedy or Drama Series (Half-Hour) and Animation	Diego Gat, Sam Ejnes, and Rob Beal (for "The Casino")	Nominated	
2022	Primetime Creative Arts Emmy Awards	Outstanding Stunt Coordination for a Comedy Series or Variety Program	Tig Fong and JF Lachapelle	Nominated	
2022	Imagen Awards	Best Supporting Actor – Comedy (Television)	Harvey Guillén	Won	
2022	Saturn Awards	Best Network or Cable Horror Television Series	What We Do in the Shadows	Nominated	
2022	Saturn Awards	Best Supporting Actor in a Network or Cable Television Series	Harvey Guillén	Nominated	
2023	Art Directors Guild Awards	Excellence in Production Design for a Half Hour Single-Camera Television Series	Shayne Fox (for "The Grand Opening"; "The Night Market"; "Pine Barrens")	Nominated	
2023	Cinema Audio Society Awards	Outstanding Achievement in Sound Mixing for Television Series – Half Hour	Rob Beal, Sam Ejnes, Diego Gat, Marc Fishman, Stacey Michaels (for "Pine Barrens")	Nominated	
2023	Costume Designers Guild Awards	Excellence in Sci-Fi/Fantasy Television	Laura Montgomery (for "The Wedding")	Nominated	
2023	Critics' Choice Television Awards	Best Actor in a Comedy Series	Matt Berry	Nominated	
2023	GLAAD Media Awards	Outstanding Comedy Series	What We Do in the Shadows	Won	
2023	Hollywood Critics Association TV Awards	Best Cable Series, Comedy	What We Do in the Shadows	Nominated	
2023	Hollywood Critics Association TV Awards	Best Actress in a Broadcast Network or Cable Series, Comedy	Natasia Demetriou	Nominated	
2023	Hollywood Critics Association TV Awards	Best Supporting Actor in a Broadcast Network or Cable Series, Comedy	Harvey Guillén	Nominated	
2023	Hollywood Critics Association TV Awards	Best Directing in a Broadcast Network or Cable Series, Comedy	Kyle Newacheck (for "Private School")	Nominated	
2023	Hollywood Critics Association TV Awards	Best Writing in a Broadcast Network or Cable Series, Comedy	Ayo Edebiri and Shana Gohd (for "Private School")	Won	
2023	Hollywood Critics Association Creative Arts TV Awards	Best Casting in a Comedy Series	What We Do in the Shadows	Nominated	
2023	Hollywood Critics Association Creative Arts TV Awards	Best Guest Actor in a Comedy Series	Nick Kroll	Nominated	
2023	Primetime Creative Arts Emmy Awards	Outstanding Fantasy/Sci-Fi Costumes	Laura Montgomery, Barbara Cardoso, Judy Laukkanen (for "The Wedding")	Nominated	
2023	Primetime Creative Arts Emmy Awards	Outstanding Picture Editing for a Single-Camera Comedy Series	Yana Gorskaya and Dane McMaster (for "Go Flip Yourself")	Nominated	
2023	Primetime Creative Arts Emmy Awards	Outstanding Production Design for a Narrative Program (Half-Hour)	Shayne Fox, Aaron Noël, and Kerri Wylie (for "The Night Market")	Nominated	
2023	Primetime Creative Arts Emmy Awards	Outstanding Sound Editing for a Comedy or Drama Series (Half-Hour) and Animation	Steffan Falesitch, Chris Kahwaty, David Barbee, Steve Griffen, John Guentner, Sam Lewis, Ellen Heuer (for "The Night Market")	Nominated	
2023	Saturn Awards	Best Horror Television Series	What We Do in the Shadows	Nominated	
2023	Saturn Awards	Best Supporting Actor in a Television Series	Harvey Guillén	Nominated	
2023	TCA Awards	Outstanding Achievement in Comedy	What We Do in the Shadows	Nominated	
2023	Writers Guild of America Awards	Episodic Comedy	Ayo Edebiri and Shana Gohd (for "Private School")	Nominated	
2024	Art Directors Guild Awards	Excellence in Production Design for a Half Hour Single-Camera Television Series	Shayne Fox (for "A Weekend at Morrigan Manor")	Nominated	
2024	Cinema Audio Society Awards	Outstanding Achievement in Sound Mixing for Television Series – Half Hour	Rob Beal, Samuel Ejnes, Diego Gat, Stacey Michaels (for "Local News")	Nominated	
2024	Costume Designers Guild Awards	Excellence in Sci-Fi/Fantasy Television	Laura Montgomery (for "Pride Parade")	Nominated	
2024	Critics' Choice Television Awards	Best Comedy Series	What We Do in the Shadows	Nominated	
2024	Critics' Choice Television Awards	Best Actor in a Comedy Series	Kayvan Novak	Nominated	
2024	Critics' Choice Television Awards	Best Supporting Actor in a Comedy Series	Harvey Guillén	Nominated	
2024	GLAAD Media Awards	Outstanding Comedy Series	What We Do in the Shadows	Nominated	
2024	Critics' Choice Super Awards	Best Horror Series, Limited Series or Made-for-TV Movie	What We Do in the Shadows	Nominated	
2024	Writers Guild of America Awards	Episodic Comedy	Jake Bender and Zach Dunn (for "Pride Parade")	Nominated	
2024	Primetime Emmy Awards	Outstanding Comedy Series	What We Do in the Shadows	Nominated	
2024	Primetime Emmy Awards	Outstanding Lead Actor in a Comedy Series	Matt Berry (for "Pride Parade")	Nominated	
2024	Primetime Emmy Awards	Outstanding Writing for a Comedy Series	Jake Bender and Zach Dunn (for "Pride Parade")	Nominated	
2024	Primetime Creative Arts Emmy Awards	Outstanding Production Design for a Narrative Program (Half-Hour)	Shayne Fox, Jody Clement, Aaron Noël, and Kerri Wylie (for "A Weekend at Morrigan Manor")	Nominated	
2024	Primetime Creative Arts Emmy Awards	Outstanding Fantasy/Sci-Fi Costumes	Laura Montgomery, Kay Jameson, Amy Sztulwark, and Anna Viksne (for "Pride Parade")	Nominated	
2024	Primetime Creative Arts Emmy Awards	Outstanding Picture Editing for a Single-Camera Comedy Series	Liza Cardinale and A.J. Dickerson (for "Pride Parade")	Nominated	
2024	Primetime Creative Arts Emmy Awards	Outstanding Sound Mixing for a Comedy or Drama Series (Half-Hour) and Animation	Diego Gat, Samuel Ejnes, and Rob Beal (for "Local News")	Nominated	
2024	Primetime Creative Arts Emmy Awards	Outstanding Stunt Coordination for Comedy Programming	Tig Fong and JF Lachapelle	Nominated	
2024	Set Decorators Society of America Awards	Best Achievement in Décor/Design of a Half-Hour Single-Camera Series	Kerri Wylie, Shayne Fox	Nominated	
2025	American Cinema Editors Awards	Best Edited Single-Camera Comedy Series	Liza Cardinale and Dane McMaster (for "Sleep Hypnosis")	Won	
2025	Cinema Audio Society Awards	Outstanding Achievement in Sound Mixing for Television Series – Half Hour	Rob Beal, Diego Gat, Christina Wen, Caitlin McDaid, Judah Getz, Alex Jongbloed (for "Nandor's Army")	Nominated	
2025	Critics' Choice Super Awards	Best Horror Series, Limited Series or Made-for-TV Movie	What We Do in the Shadows	Nominated	
2025	Critics' Choice Super Awards	Best Actor in a Horror Series, Limited Series or Made-for-TV Movie	Matt Berry	Nominated	
2025	Critics' Choice Super Awards	Best Actress in a Horror Series, Limited Series or Made-for-TV Movie	Natasia Demetriou	Nominated	
2025	Critics' Choice Television Awards	Best Comedy Series	What We Do in the Shadows	Nominated	
2025	Critics' Choice Television Awards	Best Actor in a Comedy Series	Kayvan Novak	Nominated	
2025	Critics' Choice Television Awards	Best Actress in a Comedy Series	Natasia Demetriou	Nominated	
2025	Critics' Choice Television Awards	Best Supporting Actor in a Comedy Series	Harvey Guillén	Nominated	
2025	GLAAD Media Awards	Outstanding Comedy Series	What We Do in the Shadows	Nominated	
2025	Golden Reel Awards	Outstanding Achievement in Sound Editing – Broadcast Short Form	Steffan Falesitch, David Barbee, Mark Relyea, Paul Bercovitch, Sam C. Lewis, Lyndsey Schenk, Adam DeCoster, Alex Ullrich (for "Come Out and Play")	Nominated	
2025	Golden Trailer Awards	Best Comedy Poster for a TV/Streaming Series	FX Networks / Mocean (for "Payoff Poster")	Nominated	
2025	Primetime Emmy Awards	Outstanding Comedy Series	What We Do in the Shadows	Nominated	
2025	Primetime Emmy Awards	Outstanding Writing for a Comedy Series	Sam Johnson, Sarah Naftalis, and Paul Simms (for "The Finale")	Nominated	
2025	Saturn Awards	Best Genre Comedy Television Series	What We Do in the Shadows	Nominated	
2025	Saturn Awards	Best Supporting Actor in a Television Series	Matt Berry	Nominated	
2025	Satellite Awards	Best Genre Series	What We Do in the Shadows	Won	
2025	Satellite Awards	Best Actress in a Supporting Role in a Series, Miniseries & Limited Series, or Motion Picture Made for Television	Kristen Schaal	Nominated	
2025	Set Decorators Society of America Awards	Best Achievement in Décor/Design of a Half-Hour Single-Camera Series	Kerri Wylie, Shayne Fox	Nominated	
2025	Television Critics Association Awards	Outstanding Achievement in Comedy	What We Do in the Shadows	Nominated	
