= Sam Johnson and Chris Marcil =

Sam Johnson and Chris Marcil are an American television writing and television production team.

== Producing credits ==
- How I Met Your Mother (consulting producers)
- Frasier (executive producers)
- NewsRadio (executive producers & executive story editors)
- The Troop (executive producers)
- Hot in Cleveland (executive producers)

== Writing credits ==
- How I Met Your Mother
- Jake in Progress
- Frasier
- Daria
- NewsRadio
- Beavis and Butt-Head
- Beavis and Butt-Head in Virtual Stupidity
- The Brothers Grunt
- The Adventures of Pete & Pete
- The Assistants
- The Troop
- Hot in Cleveland
- What We Do in the Shadows

== Acting credits ==
Frasier, Beavis and Butt-head in Virtual Stupidity, and Beavis and Butt-head

== Awards and nominations ==
Marcil was nominated for 3 Primetime Emmys. Johnson was nominated for 5 Primetime Emmys.
