= Paul Simms =

American television writer and producer

- Born: 1966 (age 59–60)
- Occupations: Television writer and producer

Paul Simms (born 1966) is an American television writer and producer. He is known for creating NewsRadio and contributing to The Larry Sanders Show, Flight of the Conchords, What We Do in the Shadows, and Atlanta.

== Early life and career ==
Simms spent much of his childhood living abroad in Pakistan and Saudi Arabia where his parents were school teachers. He later returned to the United States and graduated from Harvard University where he wrote for the Harvard Lampoon and was a part-time student security guard, often during the night shift. After graduating, he worked for Spy magazine from 1988 to 1990.

== Television ==
He began his career in television writing for Late Night with David Letterman in 1990. Simms later wrote for the HBO program The Larry Sanders Show. He was the creator and head writer for the NBC sitcom NewsRadio, a workplace comedy. More recently, he has directed and produced the HBO series Flight of the Conchords and the FX series Atlanta. He has contributed pieces to The New Yorker and also wrote a sitcom pilot, Beach Lane, starring Matthew Broderick, for executive producer Lorne Michaels. His production company is 343 Incorporated. In 2017, he signed a deal with FX.

== Filmography ==
Year	Title	Role
1990–1992	Late Night with David Letterman	Writer
1992–1994	The Larry Sanders Show	Writer, executive producer, executive story editor
1995–1999	NewsRadio	Creator, writer, executive producer
2007–2009	Flight of the Conchords	Writer, consulting producer, director
2009	Wainy Days	Writer, director
2009	Bored to Death	Consultant producer
2010	Boardwalk Empire	Writer
2014	Short Poppies	Consulting producer
2014–2015	Girls	Writer, co-executive producer/executive producer
2016–2022	Atlanta	Executive producer
2016	Divorce	Writer, executive producer
2019–2024	What We Do in the Shadows	Writer, executive producer
2024–2025	English Teacher	Writer, executive producer

== Bibliography ==
- Simms, Paul (March 11, 2013). "Crafting Projects for Sociopaths". The New Yorker. Vol. 89, no. 4. pp. 28–29.
- Simms, Paul (December 9, 2013). "The Hothead's Guide to Herbal Supplements". The New Yorker. Vol. 89, no. 40. p. 40.
- Simms, Paul (September 14, 2015). "Eight Short Science-Fiction Stories". The New Yorker. Vol. 91, no. 27. p. 50.
