= Parisa Fakhri =

American actress

- پریسا فخری
- Born: Dallas, Texas
- Occupations: Actress; Voice actress
- Years active: 1994–present

Parisa J. Fakhri is an Iranian American actress and voice actress who works for Funimation. Her voice roles include Arisa Uotani in Fruits Basket (2001) and Bra in Dragon Ball GT. She has guest-starred in a number of live action television series, such as House, CSI: NY, Agents of S.H.I.E.L.D., and SEAL Team. From 2009 to 2013, she starred as Mira in the series Dwelling, and in 2022, appeared in episodes of What We Do in the Shadows as Marwa, one of Nandor's thirty-seven wives.

== Filmography ==
=== Television roles ===
- Make It or Break It - Dr. Eileen Curtis (Episode: "Growing Pains")
- Castle - Colette (Episode: "Till Death Do Us Part")
- House - Susan (Episode: "Saviors")
- Eli Stone - Sana (Episode: "Should I Stay or Should I Go?")
- Agents of S.H.I.E.L.D. (Episodes: "A Fractured House" as Senator's Aide and "Love in the Time of Hydra" as Lt. Decker)
- The Thundermans - Lady Web (Episode: "A Hero Is Born", and "Secret Revealed")
- SEAL Team - Naima Perry
- What We Do in the Shadows - Marwa (7 episodes)

=== Anime roles ===
- Case Closed - Rene Kinsella (Ep. 11–12), Sarah (Ep. 27)
- Dragon Ball GT - Bra, Bulma Leigh (Ep. 64)
- Fruits Basket (2001) - Arisa Uotani
- Fullmetal Alchemist - Elisa (Ep. 11–12)
- Kiddy Grade - Rita Verruccio (Ep.9)

=== Video game roles ===
- Dying Light - Troy and other characters
