= Yana Gorskaya =

Russian-American film editor

- Яна Горская
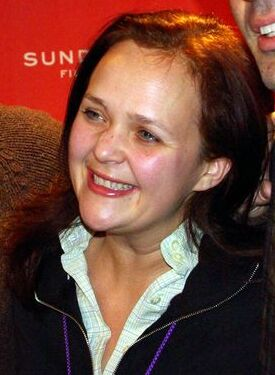
- Gorskaya in 2010
- Born: Yana Viktorovna Gorokhovskaya; Soviet Union
- Education: Columbia University (BA); University of Southern California (MFA)
- Occupations: Film and television director; producer; editor
- Years active: 2002–present

Yana Gorskaya (Russian: Яна Горская) is a Russian-American director, producer and film editor. She is best known for her work as director and executive producer of the TV series What We Do in the Shadows (2019) and in the editorial departments of nearly all of director Taika Waititi’s films, including Hunt for the Wilderpeople (2016),Thor: Ragnarok (2017), Jojo Rabbit (2019) and the feature version of What We Do in the Shadows (2014).

== Early life and education ==
Yana Gorskaya was born in the Soviet Union, and is of Jewish descent. At the age of 6, she immigrated to the United States with her single mother.

Gorskaya obtained a Bachelor of Arts from New York City's Columbia University and later attended the University of Southern California (USC) to obtain a Master of Fine Arts degree.

== Career ==
Gorskaya was hired to edit her first feature film, Spellbound (2002), when director Jeffrey Blitz asked his former USC mentor Kate Amend if she would recommend one of her students to work on his documentary film. Amend suggested Gorskaya, who was working as a teaching assistant while completing her MFA; Gorskaya accepted the offer and put together the final cut of the film, working part-time from 2000–2002. Spellbound was ultimately nominated for the Academy Award for Best Documentary Feature, and Gorskaya won the American Cinema Editors Award for Best Edited Documentary. Her next three features, also documentaries, were In the Name of Love (2003), produced by Sydney Pollack, about Russian marriage agencies, Sonny Boy (2004), directed by Soleil Moon Frye, focusing on Frye's relationship with her father, and Seeds (2004), about the Seeds of Peace camp in Maine.

Gorskaya's first non-documentary feature was 2007's Rocket Science, with which she worked with Blitz for a second time.

She began her collaboration with Taika Waititi on his first feature, Eagle vs Shark (2007), and is credited as an editor or consulting editor on nearly all of his films, including Boy (2010), What We Do in the Shadows (2014), Hunt for the Wilderpeople (2016), Thor: Ragnarok (2017), Jojo Rabbit (2019), and Next Goal Wins (2023).

Her series directing work has made the best of the year lists in the NY Times, Rolling Stone, A.V. Club, TV Guide, Entertainment Weekly, USA Today, Vulture, Hollywood Reporter, Decider and IGN.

As one of the key creatives on What We Do in the Shadows, she directed 22 episodes across 6 seasons, including fan favorite On the Run with Jackie Daytona, and other Emmy-nominated episodes including Collaboration, Casino and Wellness Center. She has received six Emmy nominations for her work on the show.

Other directing credits include the NBC series Trial & Error (2017-2018) and the upcoming adaptation of Terry Gilliam’s 1981 film Time Bandits, produced and written by Taika Waititi and Jemaine Clement.

Gorskaya is also a screenwriter with writing partner and childhood friend Maia Rossini. They sold a musical comedy to Fox with Paul Feig attached to direct. They are represented at UTA.

== Personal life ==
Gorskaya is fluent in English, Russian, French, and Spanish. She currently resides in Los Angeles, California.
