= The Mall (What We Do in the Shadows) =

- What We Do in the Shadows episode
- Episode no.: Season 5 Episode 1
- Directed by: Yana Gorskaya
- Written by: Marika Sawyer
- Cinematography by: David A. Makin
- Editing by: A.J. Dickerson
- Production code: XWS05001
- Original air date: July 13, 2023
- Running time: 23 minutes

Guest appearance
- Chris Sandiford as Derek

Episode chronology
← Previous "Sunrise, Sunset"	Next → "A Night Out with the Guys"

"The Mall" is the first episode of the fifth season of the American mockumentary comedy horror television series What We Do in the Shadows, set in the franchise of the same name. It is the 41st overall episode of the series and was written by co-executive producer Marika Sawyer, and directed by co-executive producer Yana Gorskaya. It was released on FX on July 13, 2023, airing back-to-back with the follow-up episode, "A Night Out with the Guys".

The series is set in Staten Island, New York City. Like the 2014 film, the series follows the lives of vampires in the city. These consist of three vampires, Nandor, Laszlo, and Nadja. They live alongside Colin Robinson, an energy vampire; and Guillermo, Nandor's familiar. The series explores the absurdity and misfortunes experienced by the vampires. In the episode, the vampires try to lift Guillermo's spirits, unaware that he asked Derek to turn him into a vampire. As the season five premiere, it is the first episode in which Kristen Schaal, a recurring guest since the first season, is credited as series regular, although she does not actually appear and instead makes her season debut in the following episode.

According to Nielsen Media Research, the episode was seen by an estimated 0.326 million household viewers and gained a 0.12 ratings share among adults aged 18–49. The episode received extremely positive reviews from critics, who praised the new status quo, performances and humor.

== Plot ==
The vampires note a change in Guillermo (Harvey Guillén), but cannot fully see what it is. Eventually, Guillermo states that they abuse their powers in public, which by result is turning the borough dumber with their hypnosis. Privately, he confides to the documentary crew that he asked Derek (Chris Sandiford) to turn him into a vampire. Derek accidentally bit Guillermo's jugular vein and was scared of drinking his blood. Eventually, Guillermo drank Derek's blood, finally becoming a vampire.

Nandor (Kayvan Novak), inspired after reading I'm OK – You're OK, believes that Guillermo's behavior is due to the vampires forgetting his birthday, despite the fact that it is not his birthday. He gets the vampires to invite Guillermo to dine at a restaurant. They pick Red Rock Steakhouse, which is where Colin Robinson (Mark Proksch) works as a waiter. Guillermo arrives, just as they crack jokes about turning him into a vampire. However, Guillermo's attempts at joking about asking someone else to turn him into a vampire are met with disdain; the vampires state that a familiar asking someone other than his master would be the biggest humiliation for his master, with Nandor threatening to kill Guillermo and then kill himself if he ever does it.

As they leave, the vampires are astounded to discover a mall nearby. While Nandor and Nadja (Natasia Demetriou) are distracted by the offers, Laszlo (Matt Berry) follows Guillermo. Guillermo tells the documentary crew that despite being transformed 16 days ago, he still hasn't acquired any powers or weaknesses of a vampire. Guillermo is informed by an optician that his eye vision is actually improving. Despite not needing glasses, Guillermo asks to keep his glasses without the lenses to avoid suspicion. As he prepares Nandor for bed, Guillermo wonders about the consequences of his actions. He then goes to sleep inside a footlocker that Nandor gave him as a birthday gift.

== Production ==
=== Development ===
In June 2023, FX confirmed that the first episode of the season would be titled "The Mall", and that it would be written by co-executive producer Marika Sawyer, and directed by co-executive producer Yana Gorskaya. This was Sawyer's seventh writing credit, and Gorskaya's 13th directing credit.

== Reception ==
=== Viewers ===
In its original American broadcast, "The Mall" was seen by an estimated 0.326 million household viewers with a 0.12 in the 18-49 demographics. This means that 0.12 percent of all households with televisions watched the episode. This was a 16% decrease in viewership from the previous episode, which was watched by 0.388 million household viewers with a 0.12 in the 18-49 demographics.

=== Critical reviews ===
"The Mall" received extremely positive reviews from critics. William Hughes of The A.V. Club gave the episode an "A–" grade and wrote, "'Vampires go to the mall' is an idea this show would have played with back in the first season, and, for as fun as it is to see Nandor try to pay for stuff with expired oil change coupons and pictures of Ryan Seacrest, there really isn't very much to it — which is fine, because it's not actually the point of the episode."

Katie Rife of Vulture gave the episode a 4 star rating out of 5 and wrote, "I'm honestly surprised that the show could find a mall that was still functional enough to shoot those location scenes in the year 2023. But that's another thing we know about vampires: They find out about everything 30 years too late." Tony Sokol of Den of Geek wrote, "The very first episode, 'The Mall,' takes place in a populated retail mecca, complete with Build-a-Bear and a carousel. In the same episode, Nandor hypnotizes an entire sports arena to forget a simple misstep in the stands. The scene is one of the most populated sequences on the show, but only used for a small insert gag."

Melody McCune of Telltale TV gave the episode a 4.5 star rating out of 5 and wrote, "What We Do in the Shadows Season 5 proves the vampire comedy is as robust as ever, delivering clever storytelling and laughs in equal measure. The writers mine the depths of these larger-than-life yet grounded characters to propel the narrative in exciting directions." Alejandra Bodden of Bleeding Cool gave the episode a 9 out of 10 rating and wrote, "I do find it funny that Guillermo agrees to take them to the mall with him and actually believes they will stay still. I loved there was a carousel that Nandor was enjoying way too much, and that Nadja finds their version of Build-A-Bear. I am a fan of when the adventures take place outside of their home, which by the way it is now fixed."
