= Exit Interview (What We Do in the Shadows) =

- What We Do in the Shadows episode
- Episode no.: Season 5 Episode 10
- Directed by: Tig Fong
- Written by: Jake Bender; Zach Dunn; Sam Johnson; Sarah Naftalis; Paul Simms
- Cinematography by: Michael Storey
- Editing by: Liza Cardinale; A.J. Dickerson; Dane McMaster
- Production code: XWS05010
- Original air date: August 31, 2023
- Running time: 27 minutes

Guest appearances
- Patton Oswalt as Himself; Doug Jones as Baron Afanas; Haley Joel Osment as Topher Delmonico; Benedict Wong as Wallace; Chris Sandiford as Derek; Anoop Desai as The Djinn

Episode chronology
| ← Previous "A Weekend at Morrigan Manor" | Next → "The Return of Jerry" |

"Exit Interview" is the tenth episode and season finale of the fifth season of the American mockumentary comedy horror television series What We Do in the Shadows, set in the franchise of the same name. It is the 50th overall episode of the series and was written by producer Jake Bender, producer Zach Dunn, executive producer Sam Johnson, supervising producer Sarah Naftalis and executive producer Paul Simms, and directed by Tig Fong. It was released on FX on August 31, 2023, airing back-to-back with the previous episode "A Weekend at Morrigan Manor".

The series is set in Staten Island, New York City. Like the 2014 film, the series follows the lives of vampires in the city. These consist of three vampires, Nandor, Laszlo, and Nadja. They live alongside Colin Robinson, an energy vampire; and Guillermo, Nandor's familiar. The series explores the absurdity and misfortunes experienced by the vampires. In the episode, Guillermo flees from an irate Nandor, who intends to kill him for getting Derek to turn him into a vampire.

According to Nielsen Media Research, the episode was seen by an estimated 0.194 million household viewers and gained a 0.05 ratings share among adults aged 18–49. The episode received critical acclaim, with critics praising the resolution to Guillermo's arc, although some felt that the series rehashed previous storylines.

== Plot ==
After fleeing the manor, Guillermo (Harvey Guillén) is hiding out in a motel room, while Derek (Chris Sandiford) helps him with supplies. Nadja (Natasia Demetriou) drops by and it becomes apparent that Derek is not the best at keeping secrets. Guillermo angrily kicks out Derek, prompting Nadja to warn that he must be more considerate to Derek, as Derek is his Sire.

Nandor (Kayvan Novak) is searching for Guillermo across New York, planning to capture him at his favorite spot: a Panera Bread store. He attacks a pedestrian whom he believes is Guillermo, but finds that he is actually actor Patton Oswalt. He tries to build a friendship with Oswalt, but throws him off a building to his death, when it is suggested that he try reconciling with Guillermo. However, he is shaken from having committed the deed.

Colin Robinson (Mark Proksch) visits Guillermo at the motel, conducting an exit interview from his duties as familiar. He is also visited by Laszlo (Matt Berry), who gets distracted by a porno playing on the television. Later, Guillermo is visited by the Guide (Kristen Schaal), who has brought the hybrids to bid farewell to Guillermo. Guillermo is then called by Nandor, who reveals he has visited Guillermo's mother, telling him to meet him at her apartment. Guillermo hurriedly arrives, where Nandor surprises him by saying he won't kill him, as Oswalt's death made him reconsider. Guillermo initially does not believe him, but changes his mind upon finding that Nandor wants him to stake him if he is lying.

Nandor and Guillermo return to the house, with Nandor proclaiming he is now one of them. When Laszlo states that Guillermo is still not a full vampire, Nandor gives Guillermo a glass of human blood to drink, something that Laszlo never considered. Guillermo drinks it, finally becoming a vampire by proudly displaying his powers. The vampires then go to a restaurant where they slaughter the patrons and drink on their blood. However, Guillermo doesn't take part in the massacre, telling the documentary crew that he is shaken up about the idea of actually killing people. After he leaves, it is revealed that Nandor overheard everything, revealing this was why he was not ready to turn him. Realizing that Guillermo is not cut out to be a vampire, he summons the Djinn (Anoop Desai) to make a wish, only to find that he ran out of wishes a long time ago.

Guillermo is led to a ceremony attended by the vampires, Derek, the Baron (Doug Jones) and the Sire, where he must proclaim himself as either a human or a vampire. When Guillermo decides that he wants to be human, Nandor has everyone wear hoods, but everyone removes theirs, except Derek who is the only one to have his face covered. Nandor instructs Guillermo that he must kill Derek to become human. When Guillermo cannot bring himself to do it, Nandor does it instead, staking Derek and causing Guillermo to revert to being a human. After everyone leaves, Guillermo and Laszlo take Derek's corpse to Wallace (Benedict Wong), the necromancer. Derek is resurrected as a zombie, and Topher (Haley Joel Osment) states that he will eventually learn to talk just like he did. Topher then takes Derek to join them in the basement.

== Production ==
=== Development ===
In August 2023, FX confirmed that the tenth and final episode of the season would be titled "Exit Interview", and that it would be written by producer Jake Bender, producer Zach Dunn, executive producer Sam Johnson, supervising producer Sarah Naftalis and executive producer Paul Simms, and directed by Tig Fong. This was Bender's fifth writing credit, Dunn's fifth writing credit, Johnson's ninth writing credit, Naftalis' seventh writing credit, Simms' 14th writing credit, and Fong's fourth directing credit.

=== Casting ===
The episode featured an appearance by Patton Oswalt as himself. For the role, they needed an actor with comedic skills, who somewhat resembled Guillermo, or had enough of a resemblance, that it was plausible that Nandor would mistake him for Guillermo. Panera Bread allowed the series to film at one of its stores.

== Reception ==
=== Viewers ===
In its original American broadcast, "Exit Interview" was seen by an estimated 0.194 million household viewers with a 0.05 in the 18-49 demographics. This means that 0.05 percent of all households with televisions watched the episode. This was a 19% decrease in viewership from the previous episode, which was watched by 0.239 million household viewers with a 0.07 in the 18-49 demographics.

=== Critical reviews ===
"Exit Interview" received critical acclaim. William Hughes of The A.V. Club gave the episode an "A" grade and wrote, "Pretty much every character in 'Exit Interview,' big-name cameo or no, gets a moment that's laugh-out-loud funny, while the story zigs and zags in unpredictable ways. What We Do In The Shadows pretty much only ever looks bad in comparison to itself, and when it works - which it did more often than not this season, and especially tonight — there's very little that's as fearless or as funny existing in the comedy landscape."

Proma Khosla of IndieWire wrote, "After the Season 5 finale, What We Do in the Shadows has changed forever. Or... will it stay exactly the same? Throughout the series, the FX comedy's writers have proved how adept they are at maintaining equilibrium without sacrificing sitcom shenanigans and character development. Episode 510, 'Exit Interview,' drives this home spectacularly, but realigns the show's central mission moving forward." Katie Rife of Vulture gave the episode a 3 star rating out of 5 and wrote, "while it's always lovely to see those two reaffirm their queerplatonic love, it's hard to shake the feeling that What We Do in the Shadows is spinning its wheels at this point. We've now gone through multiple iterations of Guillermo's inner conflict over his identity and its aftermath. Now that the vampire (and vampire hunter) questions are settled, where do we go from here? At the end of season five, the answer is 'back to season two,' which is when we first met the Necromancer and Topher, the ill-fated familiar who pops back up as a zombie at the end of this episode. Now Derek goes down the sitcom-lore hole as well, possibly to pop back up next year."

Tony Sokol of Den of Geek wrote, "Most of Guillermo's charm comes from this intense desire to move into eternal life. If he no longer desires it, having been faced with a vampire's reality, does he even have a reason to stay at the vampire house? He will, of course, because What We Do in the Shadows is not going to break up the best undead comedy troupe currently drawing blood." Melody McCune of Telltale TV gave the episode a 4 star rating out of 5 and wrote, "All in all, Season 5 is a somewhat bumpy ride that falters here and there, but when it sings, it mother-forking sings. Even when it's not at its strongest, What We Do in the Shadows is still one of TV's funniest and sharpest comedies."
