= A Night Out with the Guys =

- What We Do in the Shadows episode
- Episode no.: Season 5 Episode 2
- Directed by: Kyle Newacheck
- Written by: Paul Simms
- Cinematography by: Kim Derko
- Editing by: Liza Cardinale; A.J. Dickerson
- Production code: XWS05002
- Original air date: July 13, 2023
- Running time: 23 minutes

Guest appearances
- Doug Jones as Baron Afaras; Anthony Atamanuik as Sean Rinaldi; Chris Sandiford as Derek; Ivan Martin as Terry

Episode chronology
| ← Previous "The Mall" | Next → "Pride Parade" |

"A Night Out with the Guys" is the second episode of the fifth season of the American mockumentary comedy horror television series What We Do in the Shadows, set in the franchise of the same name. It is the 42nd overall episode of the series and was written by executive producer Paul Simms, and directed by co-executive producer Kyle Newacheck. It was released on FX on July 13, 2023, airing back-to-back with the previous episode, "The Mall".

The series is set in Staten Island, New York City. Like the 2014 film, the series follows the lives of vampires in the city. These consist of three vampires, Nandor, Laszlo, and Nadja. They live alongside Colin Robinson, an energy vampire; and Guillermo, Nandor's familiar. The series explores the absurdity and misfortunes experienced by the vampires. In the episode, Nandor and Laszlo go out with Sean and his friends, while the Guide helps Nadja with a possible curse. "A Night Out with the Guys" feature previous recurring guest Kristen Schaal's first appearance as regular cast member, although she was credited in the opening of the "The Mall".

According to Nielsen Media Research, the episode was seen by an estimated 0.284 million household viewers and gained a 0.10 ratings share among adults aged 18–49. The episode received positive reviews from critics, who praised the humor and progress on Guillermo's storyline, but Nadja's subplot received criticism.

== Plot ==
Nandor (Kayvan Novak) and Laszlo (Matt Berry) prepare to accompany Sean (Anthony Atamanuik) on a night out with his friends. However, Laszlo is worried about Nandor's over-reliance on hypnosis on Sean. The night gets complicated as it involves drinking wine, and Sean and his friends question how neither Nandor and Laszlo ever drink anything.

At the house, Nadja (Natasia Demetriou) laments her situation, as she has fallen into alcoholism and accidentally crushed Ghost Nadja's legs. The Guide (Kristen Schaal), wanting to build a friendship with her, suggests that it might be a hex curse. After Nadja fails in a ritual, Colin Robinson (Mark Proksch) suggests visiting "Little Antipaxos", as it will connect Nadja to her birthplace. The locals state that Nadja's hex can only be solved if she changes her attitude for the better. Meanwhile, Guillermo (Harvey Guillén) is still unsure of his vampiric status. He and Derek (Chris Sandiford) go to Nutley to ask the Baron (Doug Jones) for help. The Sire suggests that the process might work if the process is ampled in size. From this, the Baron has Derek bite his vampire aide Jonathan, who in turn bites him back. However, the process ends up killing Jonathan.

Conflict arises among Sean's friends, which culminates with a fight that shatters the restaurant's window. When a police officer approaches them, they identify him as an old high school friend. Sean handcuffs the officer from his ankles and they subsequently go joyriding his police cruiser. They eventually crash the car, and one of the friends shoots the officer's weapon, alerting the police. Laszlo tries to solve the problem without hypnosis, but they end up arrested instead. At their holding cell, Laszlo confesses that he feels envious of Nandor's hypnosis skills and that he is the only one who can save them. Nandor hypnotizes the officers to release him by convincing them he is Sully Sullenberger. They then use the police car to pick up Nadja, Colin Robinson and the Guide. Laszlo also confronts Guillermo over his "secret". Guillermo confesses to Derek turning him into a vampire, but Laszlo is shocked, as he believed he had diarrhea. Laszlo is upset, but won't tell Nandor about it.

== Production ==
=== Development ===
In June 2023, FX confirmed that the second episode of the season would be titled "A Night Out with the Guys", and that it would be written by executive producer Paul Simms, and directed by co-executive producer Kyle Newacheck. This was Simms' 12th writing credit, and Newacheck's 13th directing credit.

== Reception ==
=== Viewers ===
In its original American broadcast, "A Night Out with the Guys" was seen by an estimated 0.284 million household viewers with a 0.10 in the 18-49 demographics. This means that 0.10 percent of all households with televisions watched the episode. This was a 13% decrease in viewership from the previous episode, which was watched by 0.326 million household viewers with a 0.12 in the 18-49 demographics.

=== Critical reviews ===
"A Night Out with the Guys" received positive reviews from critics. William Hughes of The A.V. Club gave the episode a "B" grade and wrote, "Laszlo is now on to Guillermo, which can only be a good thing, in that few character dynamics on this show can't be helped by tossing Matt Berry into the mix. In other words, all of our plots are slowly moving around, but What We Do In The Shadows is, happily, a show more concerned with the fun of getting somewhere than the destination."

Katie Rife of Vulture gave the episode a 3 star rating out of 5 and wrote, "The main plot of episode two wrapped up in a satisfying (and funny!) manner, as did Guillermo and Derek's visit to the Pine Barrens to consult the Baron and the Sire (always nice to see those cuties again) on what to do about their 'friend's' half-vampiric dilemma. But the episode's other subplot, involving Nadja and the Guide, felt unresolved by comparison." Tony Sokol of Den of Geek wrote, "'Baron's Night Out' unleashed Baron Afanas onto the vast smorgasbord which is Staten Island by night. This is far more apparent in the second episode of the evening, 'A Night Out with the Guys'. The installment is a master work in crowd control and human settings run amok."

Melody McCune of Telltale TV gave the episode a 4.5 star rating out of 5 and wrote, "The premiere lays the foundation for what will surely be the show’s strongest season yet, with top-tier comedic performances from an all-star cast, a bonkers storyline, and endlessly quotable one-liners. Long live the Staten Island vampires." Alejandra Bodden of Bleeding Cool gave the episode a 9 out of 10 rating and wrote, "The first two episodes of What We Do in the Shadows were fantastic, and I have to say that Laszlo further solidified his spot as my favorite bat-boi. I love how observant he is, even when he acts like he does not care."
