= Sunrise, Sunset (What We Do in the Shadows) =

- What We Do in the Shadows episode
- Episode no.: Season 4 Episode 10
- Directed by: Kyle Newacheck
- Written by: Paul Simms
- Cinematography by: Michael Storey
- Editing by: Dane McMaster; Wendy Nomiyama
- Production code: XWS04010
- Original air date: September 6, 2022
- Running time: 27 minutes

Guest appearances
- Anthony Atamanuik as Sean Rinaldi; Chris Sandiford as Derek; Kristen Schaal as The Guide

Episode chronology
← Previous "Freddie"	Next → "The Mall"

"Sunrise, Sunset" is the tenth episode and season finale of the fourth season of the American mockumentary comedy horror television series What We Do in the Shadows, set in the franchise of the same name. It is the 40th overall episode of the series and was written by executive producer Paul Simms, and directed by co-executive producer Kyle Newacheck. It was released on FX on September 6, 2022.

The series is set in Staten Island, New York City. Like the 2014 film, the series follows the lives of vampires in the city. These consist of three vampires, Nandor, Laszlo, and Nadja. They live alongside Colin Robinson, an energy vampire; and Guillermo, Nandor's familiar. The series explores the absurdity and misfortunes experienced by the vampires. In the episode, Baby Colin is hitting adulthood, while Nadja ponders about the future of the nightclub.

According to Nielsen Media Research, the episode was seen by an estimated 0.388 million household viewers and gained a 0.12 ratings share among adults aged 18–49. The episode received positive reviews from critics, who praised the closure to Colin Robinson's storyline and potential set-up, although the pacing and tone received a mixed response.

== Plot ==
Baby Colin (Mark Proksch) has hit adulthood, but he is still mentally immature and refuses to listen to Laszlo (Matt Berry). As he no longer performs, the nightclub has lost popularity, with Nadja (Natasia Demetriou) lamenting their profits are not enough to fix the house. She considers many options, including hosting talks with Mahatma Gandhi, Leonardo da Vinci, Scott Joplin, Che Guevara and Ernest Hemingway.

As Baby Colin continues rebelling, Guillermo (Harvey Guillén) suggests they must introduce him again into energy vampirism. Left with no choice, Laszlo addresses the fact to Baby Colin, who is unexpectedly smashing the wall on his room. When her talks prove to be a failure, Nadja sends the Guide (Kristen Schaal) to her house and decides to send the wraiths on a vacation to Universal Orlando. She then burns down the nightclub's main room and later brings the Guide to see the damage. However, the blood sprinklers, which have not worked in previous occasions, managed to repel the fire before it even began. The fire still made its way to Nadja's office, burning it. Not only Nadja forgot to issue for insurance, but she also forgot to retrieve the embezzled money she was hiding, which was also burnt in the fire.

Baby Colin eventually finds a box with a slide, which contains instructions to unravel a mechanism. This reveals a secret room in his apartment, which contains old diaries and clothes that were left behind by the original Colin Robinson. He reads through all the diaries just as his hair falls and he starts using glasses. He returns with the vampires, now back as the original Colin Robinson. He regains access to his bank account and starts working with contractors in fixing the house. He then asks Laszlo about his baby's bed, with Laszlo disappointed that he does not remember anything about the entire year. Guillermo talks with Nandor (Kayvan Novak), who says he just started reading books and will keep doing so for up to 20 years. This and the return of Colin Robinson make Guillermo feel that nothing will really change in the house. He moves out of the house with the embezzled money and meets with Derek (Chris Sandiford) at the convenience store. He shows him the money, telling him he will give it to him if he turns him into a vampire.

== Production ==
=== Development ===
In August 2022, FX confirmed that the tenth episode of the season would be titled "Sunrise, Sunset", and that it would be written by executive producer Paul Simms, and directed by co-executive producer Kyle Newacheck. This was Simms' eleventh writing credit, and Newacheck's 12th directing credit.

== Reception ==
=== Viewers ===
In its original American broadcast, "Sunrise, Sunset" was seen by an estimated 0.388 million household viewers with a 0.12 in the 18-49 demographics. This means that 0.09 percent of all households with televisions watched the episode. This was a slight increase in viewership from the previous episode, which was watched by 0.356 million household viewers with a 0.13 in the 18-49 demographics.

=== Critical reviews ===
"Sunrise, Sunset" received positive reviews from critics. William Hughes of The A.V. Club gave the episode a "B–" grade and wrote, "It's an oddly melancholy introduction for an oddly melancholy episode of WWDITS, as we wrap up all of this season's plotlines with a level of focus that doesn't leave the normal room for bizarre and excessive joke-telling. For a show that often lobs a gag every twenty seconds, this is a noticeably joke-light episode of Shadows, focused on putting the season pretty much back the way we found it before last year's finale."

Katie Rife of Vulture gave the episode a 4 star rating out of 5 and wrote, "In season four, What We Do in the Shadows came out twice. First and foremost, of course, was Guillermo finally working up the courage to tell his family that he’s gay in episode seven. But on a subtler, more secondary level, this season the show's writers also came out — as musical-theater fans (not that there's any overlap between the gay community and musical-theater fandom or anything). And, fulfilling a promise that began with Baby Colin's precocious interest in the work of Stephen Sondheim, this week's season finale is not only named after a song from Fiddler on the Roof, but that song is performed twice: once by Matt Berry solo and again with the whole cast gathered around the piano." Tony Sokol of Den of Geek gave the episode a 4 star rating out of 5 and wrote, "What We Do in the Shadows strayed from earlier seasons by erring on the side of traditional sitcoms this year. There have been more set pieces and montages and less spontaneous outbursts of improvisational surprise. It closes by deepening its bittersweet tone, while committing it to memory to move forward."

Melody McCune of Telltale TV gave the episode a 4 star rating out of 5 and wrote, "This finale boasts much of what we fans love: sharp-as-a-fang humor, performances you can sink your teeth into, ethereal Gothic sets fit for vampire royalty, and a few supernatural twists. Overall, Season 4 is a treat, delivering the goods while experimenting with different character dynamics and exploring new territory for our core group." Alejandra Bodden of Bleeding Cool gave the episode a 9 out of 10 rating and wrote, "While it was a much more subdued episode than I expected: a lot did happen, and man, what a cliffhanger we were left on."
