= Nandor's Army =

- What We Do in the Shadows episode
- Episode no.: Season 6 Episode 5
- Directed by: Yana Gorskaya
- Written by: Sarah Naftalis
- Cinematography by: Bevan Crothers
- Editing by: Liza Cardinale; Yana Gorskaya; Dane McMaster
- Production code: XWS06005
- Original air date: November 4, 2024
- Running time: 27 minutes

Guest appearance
- Doug Jones as Baron Afanas

Episode chronology
← Previous "The Railroad"	Next → "Laszlo's Father"

"Nandor's Army" is the fifth episode of the sixth season of the American mockumentary comedy horror television series What We Do in the Shadows, set in the franchise of the same name. It is the 55th overall episode of the series and was written by executive producer Sarah Naftalis, and directed by executive producer Yana Gorskaya. It was released on FX on November 4, 2024.

The series is set in Staten Island, New York City. Like the 2014 film, the series follows the lives of vampires in the city. These consist of three vampires, Nandor, Laszlo, and Nadja. They live alongside Colin Robinson, an energy vampire; and Guillermo, Nandor's familiar. The series explores the absurdity and misfortunes experienced by the vampires. In the episode, the vampires track Nandor to an abandoned factory in New Hampshire, where he has assembled a new "Army."

According to Nielsen Media Research, the episode was seen by an estimated 0.183 million household viewers and gained a 0.02 ratings share among adults aged 18–49. The episode received critical acclaim, with critics praising the performances, humor and emotional tone.

== Plot ==
After being fired from Cannon Capital by Guillermo (Harvey Guillén), Nandor (Kayvan Novak) has disappeared for weeks. The Baron (Doug Jones) contacts the vampires and invites them to dinner, revealing that Nandor was seen in New Hampshire. As he has been drawing attention to the vampires, he assigns them to track and stop him.

Guillermo leads the vampires to New Hampshire, finding that Nandor stays at an abandoned factory, Hancock & Sons, which was bought out by Cannon Capital. Nandor has resumed his "Relentless" title, assembling an army to conquer town to town until reaching Cannon Capital. However, the vampires find that Nandor's "Army" consists solely of factory mannequins. They also realize that Nandor's health has deteriorated, and is speaking with himself. Wanting to help him with the delusion, Laszlo (Matt Berry), Nadja (Natasia Demetriou), and Colin Robinson (Mark Proksch) "enlist" in his army. Nandor subjects them to intense training; while Laszlo and Nadja are exhausted, Colin Robinson is thrilled with the experience.

Guillermo finally talks with Nandor, explaining that he does not feel proud of firing him, but he understands how he feels to have lost his purpose after originally wishing to be a vampire. Laszlo and Nadja leave, as Laszlo has an idea to cure Nandor's delusion. However, this begins an argument between Laszlo and Nadja for not being honest with each other; Nadja is upset that Laszlo never explains any of his plans, while Laszlo is upset that she never says anything about her job. They reconcile, and Laszlo finally reveals that his plan revolves around fireworks. Noticing a store across the street, they shatter the glass to steal.

Laszlo and Nadja return to the factory to state that the war has begun, but Nandor explains that he has come to his senses and will return home. However, the fireworks start, causing Nandor to believe they are under attack. Fed up, Nadja ties Nandor with silver chains and drops him in the van, and they drive back to New York. They are stopped by a police officer, as Guillermo's car has a broken taillight. As Nadja hypnotizes the officer in letting them go, they see that a group of people are following them, realizing that Nandor's Army was actually real and the mannequins were just for practice. Nandor releases himself and resigns from his position as leader, although he instructs the Army to invade Dartmouth College, as the students are more likely to work in Wall Street. Colin Robinson tries to join the Army, until Nandor captures him with the silver chains.

== Production ==
=== Development ===
In October 2024, FX confirmed that the fifth episode of the season would be titled "Nandor's Army", and that it would be written by executive producer Sarah Naftalis, and directed by executive producer Yana Gorskaya. This was Naftalis' 9th writing credit, and Gorskaya's 19th directing credit.

=== Writing ===
According to Kayvan Novak, the script called for a reference for Apocalypse Now in his storyline. He said, "I'm a comic actor instinctually, so to take away the goofiness of this was a little intimidating because I think you've got to strike that balance between drama and comedy."

== Reception ==
=== Viewers ===
In its original American broadcast, "Nandor's Army" was seen by an estimated 0.183 million household viewers with a 0.02 in the 18-49 demographics. This means that 0.02 percent of all households with televisions watched the episode. This was a 39% increase in viewership from the previous episode, which was watched by 0.131 million household viewers with a 0.03 in the 18-49 demographics

=== Critical reviews ===
"Nandor's Army" received critical acclaim. William Hughes of The A.V. Club gave the episode an "A–" grade and wrote, "When this final season of What We Do In The Shadows kicked off, I noted that it felt a bit like the show was running through a greatest-hits compilation of its best episode “types”: the “single vampire quirk taken to its illogical extreme” episode,” or the “vampires try to fit in with regular people” installment. Tonight's episode, “Nandor's Army,” then, is the sixth season's run at the show's most ambitious episode style: the vampire road trip. And while the episode can't quite match the heights of classics like “On The Run” or “The Casino,” it's still an absolutely gorgeous half-hour of comedy, with Kayvan Novak and Harvey Guillén doing their typically excellent best at finding the humanity in this intensely goofy supernatural comedy."

Alan Sepinwall wrote, "Among the many achievements of this week's marvelous Apocalypse Now parody episode of What We Do in the Shadows is that it took “Fortunate Son,” a song that should by law never be allowed to be played in another movie or TV show after decades of overuse, and made its placement feel absolutely perfect and hilarious." Katie Rife of Vulture gave the episode a 4 star rating out of 5 and wrote, "I haven't talked much about Colin, but all the bad vibes and hurt feelings going around seem to have created the exact type of environment in which he thrives. Last week, he was all in on the railroad scheme and this week he's taking especially well to being a footsoldier in Nandor's sorta-righteous crusade against Cannon Capital. Nadja and Laszlo, predictably, don’t like being told what to do almost as much as they don’t like doing push-ups. I’m the same way, so I get it."

Noel Murray of Episodic Medium wrote, "After all, if these characters aren't going to have these kinds of conversations now, then whenever will they? Oh and by the way, this episode is also — almost against all odds, given its deeper emotional resonance — incredibly funny. I don't want to undersell that. We've only got five more Shadows left; and goodness knows, I'm going to miss watching a comedy so teeming with good jokes." Melody McCune of Telltale TV gave the episode a 4 star rating out of 5 and wrote, "Overall, this is a delightful episode in the What We Do in the Shadows canon. It's proof positive that this series is one of the best comedies out there, and it'll leave an indelible mark on the TV landscape."
