= Hybrid Creatures =

- What We Do in the Shadows episode
- Episode no.: Season 5 Episode 7
- Directed by: Kyle Newacheck
- Written by: Jeremy Levick; Rajat Suresh
- Cinematography by: Kim Derko
- Editing by: Liza Cardinale
- Production code: XWS05007
- Original air date: August 17, 2023
- Running time: 23 minutes

Guest appearance
- Kerri Kenney-Silver as Helen Johnson

Episode chronology
← Previous "Urgent Care"	Next → "The Roast"

"Hybrid Creatures" is the seventh episode of the fifth season of the American mockumentary comedy horror television series What We Do in the Shadows, set in the franchise of the same name. It is the 47th overall episode of the series and was written by executive story editors Jeremy Levick and Rajat Suresh, and directed by co-executive producer Kyle Newacheck. It was released on FX on August 17, 2023.

The series is set in Staten Island, New York City. Like the 2014 film, the series follows the lives of vampires in the city. These consist of three vampires, Nandor, Laszlo, and Nadja. They live alongside Colin Robinson, an energy vampire; and Guillermo, Nandor's familiar. The series explores the absurdity and misfortunes experienced by the vampires. In the episode, Laszlo mixes Guillermo's DNA with stray animals, creating hybrids. Meanwhile, Nadja tries to end her curse, while Nandor and Colin Robinson teach at night school.

According to Nielsen Media Research, the episode was seen by an estimated 0.350 million household viewers and gained a 0.10 ratings share among adults aged 18–49. The episode received extremely positive reviews from critics, who praised the humor and prosthetic make-up used for the creatures.

== Plot ==
Laszlo (Matt Berry) decides to test the DNA of Guillermo (Harvey Guillén) by mixing it with the DNA of stray animals. After failing to come up with expected results, Laszlo decides to give up on the experiments. He then asks Guillermo for a favor; he must kill the hybrids created from his DNA.

To fix the curse, Nadja (Natasia Demetriou) has started teaching at a night school in Little Antipaxos, where she tries to introduce students to American culture. She gets Nandor (Kayvan Novak) and Colin Robinson (Mark Proksch) to attend the class, but becomes frustrated with their presence as they do not want to leave. Nadja then meets a hex, Helen (Kerri Kenney-Silver), who claims she can help her in reverting the curse. Nadja abandons her position as teacher and hands it over to Nandor and Colin Robinson. Nandor gets the class to learn about Al-Quolanudar, but becomes upset when Colin Robinson uses his position as "the cool teacher" to drain energy.

Guillermo cannot bring himself to kill the creatures and tries to get into cages. He finds that some of them speak, and are asking him to spare them. Laszlo finds out and orders him to kill them. Guillermo feigns their deaths and releases them from the house. Back at the class, Nandor decides to take the students to a museum to learn more about Staten Island, while also talking more about Al-Quolanudar. There, Nandor discovers that one of the exhibitions includes his original underwear, downplays his achievements and only recognizes his ability to have sex while flying as early erotic fiction. This causes an angry Nandor to take down the exhibition and storm off.

Nadja is asked by Helen to bring her doughnuts and many items, with Helen claiming this is part of the spell needed. However, Nadja discovers that Helen was actually banished from a doughnut shop for harassing the workers and confronts her for her lies. Taking a pity on her, Nadja hypnotizes the workers into allowing Helen to be served again, despite not fixing her curse. At the house, Colin Robinson gives Nandor a key that his mother gave him centuries ago, and also shows him that he changed the exhibition to detail more about Nandor's sex life, lifting his spirits. The next day, Guillermo drops the creatures off at a retirement home, where their presence helps the elderly with their activities. Nevertheless, he decides to keep Binky, a fish, hiding this from Laszlo.

== Production ==
=== Development ===
In July 2023, FX confirmed that the seventh episode of the season would be titled "Hybrid Creatures", and that it would be written by executive story editors Jeremy Levick and Rajat Suresh, and directed by co-executive producer Kyle Newacheck. This was Levick's first writing credit, Sureh's first writing credit, and Newacheck's 14th directing credit.

=== Filming ===
Prosthetics designer Paul Jones supervised the creation of the hybrid creatures. As a creative brief, showrunner Paul Simms told him to view it as "Guillermo meets Island of Dr. Moreau." The frog hybrid was in the script, but Jones came up with the other animals. Jones spent eight weeks designing the final versions.

== Reception ==
=== Viewers ===
In its original American broadcast, "Hybrid Creatures" was seen by an estimated 0.350 million household viewers with a 0.10 in the 18-49 demographics. This means that 0.10 percent of all households with televisions watched the episode. This was a 31% increase in viewership from the previous episode, which was watched by 0.267 million household viewers with a 0.09 in the 18-49 demographics.

=== Critical reviews ===
"Hybrid Creatures" received positive reviews from critics. William Hughes of The A.V. Club gave the episode a "B+" grade and wrote, "If there's meant to be a uniting theme to all this madness, it's beyond our ken to parse — beyond all involved finding some comfort in a trio of pleasant lies. But What We Do In The Shadows also isn't a show where that kind of tonal dovetailing is necessary: It's a delivery mechanism for surprising, hilarious weirdness, and on that score, 'Hybrid Creatures' delivers far more often than not."

Katie Rife of Vulture gave the episode a 4 star rating out of 5 and wrote, "Setting this week's episode at a night school gives 'Hybrid Creatures' the opportunity to indulge in one of What We Do in the Shadows' most fruitful visual gags — putting vampires in pale makeup and detailed period costumes under fluorescent lighting. Instant hilarity!"

Tony Sokol of Den of Geek wrote, "We've already seen Guillermo's face on levitating frogs, but now there is a whole litter to be cleaned. The vampires have an infestation of Guillermo-things, and there's not an exterminator in the underworld who can root out the abomination. Luckily, the creatures' creator can." Melody McCune of Telltale TV gave the episode a 3.5 star rating out of 5 and wrote, "One thing What We Do in the Shadows will never lose is its penchant for bitingly witty one-liners, quirky character work, and wacky scenarios that get more bizarre as the minutes roll by. While 'Hybrid Creatures' isn't the show's best installment, it retains part of what makes this series a bloodsucking good time." Alejandra Bodden of Bleeding Cool gave the episode an 8.5 out of 10 rating and wrote, "This week's episode of FX's What We Do in the Shadows, "Hybrid Creatures," was a fantastic, unpredictable wild card."
