= Local News (What We Do in the Shadows) =

- What We Do in the Shadows episode
- Episode no.: Season 5 Episode 5
- Directed by: Yana Gorskaya
- Written by: Sarah Naftalis
- Cinematography by: David A. Makin
- Editing by: Thomas Calderón; A.J. Dickerson
- Production code: XWS05005
- Original air date: August 3, 2023
- Running time: 25 minutes

Guest appearances
- Anthony Atamanuik as Sean Rinaldi; Frankie Quiñones as Miguel; Jamie Linn Watson as Joanna Roscoe

Episode chronology
← Previous "The Campaign"	Next → "Urgent Care"

"Local News" is the fifth episode of the fifth season of the American mockumentary comedy horror television series What We Do in the Shadows, set in the franchise of the same name. It is the 45th overall episode of the series and was written by supervising producer Sarah Naftalis, and directed by co-executive producer Yana Gorskaya. It was released on FX on August 3, 2023.

The series is set in Staten Island, New York City. Like the 2014 film, the series follows the lives of vampires in the city. These consist of three vampires, Nandor, Laszlo, and Nadja. They live alongside Colin Robinson, an energy vampire; and Guillermo, Nandor's familiar. The series explores the absurdity and misfortunes experienced by the vampires. In the episode, Nandor believes he might have exposed the vampires' nature on live television, while Guillermo visits his family to talk about new changes.

According to Nielsen Media Research, the episode was seen by an estimated 0.284 million household viewers and gained a 0.08 ratings share among adults aged 18–49. The episode received mostly positive reviews from critics, who praised the ending broadcast segment, but the storylines prior to the scene received a more mixed response, but is considered one of the best episodes of the show.

== Plot ==
The episode starts with a local news report by Channel 8. They report on a water main break in West New Brighton, Staten Island, causing floods in the area. A reporter broadcasts from the area, interviewing Nandor (Kayvan Novak) as he was on the street when the flood started. During the interview, Nandor accidentally states that he witnessed a flood in 1892 before correcting himself, but then claiming to live for centuries. When the reporter claims that they "discovered the secret to eternal life", a scared Nandor runs off. Nandor returns to the house, proclaiming that he accidentally exposed their nature on TV.

Guillermo (Harvey Guillén) meets with his family. Guillermo wants to say goodbye, as his vampiric powers are evolving and his family hunting past will intervene. However, the meeting coincides with his grandmother's birthday. During the meeting, Guillermo sees Nandor back in the news trying to compel viewers to ignore his previous statement. However, this is interrupted by a news report about an incoming thunderstorm. The vampires have panicked and Nadja (Natasia Demetriou) has even dyed her hair, intending to move away. Colin Robinson (Mark Proksch) starts setting up booby traps around the house, while Laszlo (Matt Berry) suggests kidnapping the reporter, which Nandor supports.

Realizing that the house has fallen into chaos, Guillermo chooses to go. He then talks with his mother, explaining that more changes are coming, not telling her about his vampiric nature. His mother comforts him and gives him a crucifix, unaware that it burns his skin. He then leaves, with his mother noting that it is the third time this month where he said goodbye, knowing he will do it again the next week. He returns to the house, finding it filled with booby traps. When Nandor reiterates that they do not need him, Guillermo decides to leave to the main room to eat. A special news report announces that the water main break has been fixed, even though a sinkhole has emerged. Nandor and Laszlo then appear, preparing to kidnap the reporter, when their car is sucked by the sinkhole.

To retrieve the car, the vampires need to use their powers. For this, Colin Robinson burns down a news van which blocks the signal, allowing them to fly the car away, but the reporter still films and leaves to deliver it to the station, forcing the vampires to follow her. The vampires hit the station and hypnotize the reporters and viewers by making them forget about the events. To avoid suspicion, the vampires take over the rest of the news program. As Guillermo walks through the house, he walks through many booby traps.

== Production ==
=== Development ===
In July 2023, FX confirmed that the fifth episode of the season would be titled "Local News", and that it would be written by supervising producer Sarah Naftalis, and directed by co-executive producer Yana Gorskaya. This was Naftalis' fifth writing credit, and Gorskaya's 16th directing credit.

== Reception ==
=== Viewers ===
In its original American broadcast, "Local News" was seen by an estimated 0.284 million household viewers with a 0.08 in the 18-49 demographics. This means that 0.08 percent of all households with televisions watched the episode. This was a slight increase in viewership from the previous episode, which was watched by 0.268 million household viewers with a 0.11 in the 18-49 demographics.

=== Critical reviews ===
"Local News" received mostly positive reviews from critics. William Hughes of The A.V. Club gave the episode a "B" grade and wrote, "Controlled chaos is typically the order of the day for What We Do In The Shadows, a show that never met an undead panic attack it couldn’t enhance by lobbing in a few more loudly shouted bad ideas. Tonight's installment, 'Local News,' pushes that ethos to the brink, occasionally stripping the 'controlled' right off the damn thing as the vamps — sans Guillermo — take a minor blunder and escalate it into an ordeal of, as Laszlo would put it, 'blood, sweat, and teeaaars.'"

Katie Rife of Vulture gave the episode a 3 star rating out of 5 and wrote, "The entire A-plot of this episode seemed to be designed to get Nandor, Nadja, and Laszlo behind the WYXK anchor desk for the smorgasbord of silly line readings that concludes this week's episode. Which is fine. They did a good job! But the buildup to that segment was unfocused enough that I wonder whether the entire episode was reverse-engineered from the image of vampire news anchors rather than as a story per se." Proma Khosla of IndieWire gave the episode a "B+" grade and wrote, "In the end, the water main is repaired, the local population hypnotized, and the vampires protected — without Guillermo's help. What 'Local News' sets up more than anything is a growing divide between Guillermo and the others, one which may help as he continues to develop powers and must evade Nandor's wrath. Also, I know this would probably not land with most of the audience, but I would love for these guys to host the news."

Tony Sokol of Den of Geek wrote, "Many truths threaten to be revealed on 'Local News,' as a water main break in Staten Island forces the vampires into exposure, and their familiar readies to move on. 'Local News' reaches a high-water mark in comedy for the series, and a dramatic high point for Guillermo de la Cruz." Melody McCune of Telltale TV gave the episode a 4 star rating out of 5 and wrote, "'Local News' leans heavily into the popular comedy of errors trope to great success. The vampires are always funnier when they're failing spectacularly. The creative team deftly balances the hilarity of the vampires' dilemma with Guillermo's solemn narrative. Performance-wise, the crew is always stronger when they play off each other, which they do well here." Alejandra Bodden of Bleeding Cool gave the episode an 8.5 out of 10 rating and wrote, "FX's What We Do in the Shadows continues getting stronger as the season rolls along, and we further expand upon the show's universe."
