= Sleep Hypnosis =

- What We Do in the Shadows episode
- Episode no.: Season 6 Episode 3
- Directed by: Yana Gorskaya
- Written by: Marika Sawyer
- Cinematography by: Bevan Crothers
- Editing by: Liza Cardinale; Dane McMaster
- Production code: XWS06003
- Original air date: October 21, 2024
- Running time: 27 minutes

Guest appearance
- Doug Jones as Baron Afanas

Episode chronology
← Previous "Headhunting"	Next → "The Railroad"

"Sleep Hypnosis" is the third episode of the sixth season of the American mockumentary comedy horror television series What We Do in the Shadows, set in the franchise of the same name. It is the 53rd overall episode of the series and was written by co-executive producer Marika Sawyer, and directed by executive producer Yana Gorskaya. It was released on FX on October 21, 2024, airing alongside the episodes "The Return of Jerry" and "Headhunting".

The series is set in Staten Island, New York City. Like the 2014 film, the series follows the lives of vampires in the city. These consist of three vampires, Nandor, Laszlo, and Nadja. They live alongside Colin Robinson, an energy vampire; and Guillermo, Nandor's familiar. The series explores the absurdity and misfortunes experienced by the vampires. In the episode, the vampires begin hypnotizing each other for control of the house.

The episode received critical acclaim, who praised the performances (particularly Novak and Guillén), humor, concept and tone.

== Plot ==
Laszlo (Matt Berry) continues killing pedestrians to remove multiple organs for his experiments. The numerous body parts are stored haphazardly around the house, which frustrates Nadja (Natasia Demetriou). She suggests Laszlo use the room under the stairs to store the body parts, and he agrees, but Nandor (Kayvan Novak) refuses to let Laszlo use the room because he has already converted it into a personal gym.

Guillermo (Harvey Guillén) suggests holding a vote. Nandor is the only one in favor of keeping his personal gym, and he loses the vote when Nadja and Laszlo both vote in favor of Nadja's idea. Overhearing this, Colin Robinson (Mark Proksch) fears that the limited space will result in him getting kicked out of the house. He believes that with the dynamics changing with Guillermo moving out, the other three vampires will eventually either kill Colin Robinson or force him to find a new place to live. Colin Robinson tries to convince Guillermo to move back into the house, but Guillermo refuses. Colin Robinson is unable to hypnotize Nandor due to his vampiric nature, but becomes curious when Guillermo suggests hypnotizing him while sleeping. Colin Robinson tries this, telling Nandor that he must stand his ground with the space and that he can only trust on Colin Robinson as an ally.

The following day, Nandor has reverted to his Al-Quolanudar warrior persona, and is only able to speak in his native language. He starts fighting with Nadja and Laszlo over the gym space, which culminates when Nandor sets fire to the house. After consulting with Guillermo, Colin Robinson once again hypnotizes Nandor while sleeping; however, in an effort to "improve upon the original", Colin Robinson encourages Nandor to act like Richard Nixon, which renders Nandor unable to speak unless he is directly quoting Nixon. Seeing that sleep hypnosis works, Nadja hypnotizes Laszlo to start cleaning the house. Guillermo helps Colin Robinson in hypnotizing Nandor back to normal. After witnessing this, Laszlo hypnotizes Nandor, Nadja, and Colin Robinson into believing they are his servants.

Guillermo visits the Baron (Doug Jones) for help. The Baron agrees to give Guillermo a recording of his hypnosis technique but warns Guillermo not to listen to the recording, or else he will be hypnotized. However, the hypnosis causes Nandor, Nadja, Laszlo, and Colin Robinson to forget they had ever met each other, and they once again begin arguing about the room under the stairs. The Guide (Kristen Schaal) arrives, finds out about the events, and hypnotizes the four vampires into forgetting they had ever been hypnotized. However, while sleeping, Guillermo accidentally listens to the Baron's recording on loop, causing him to forget everything that happened to him in the past fifteen years. Guillermo shows up in the living room and asks about a job application he took to be the vampires' familiar. Nandor conducts a job interview and hires Guillermo back, although he tells the documentary crew that he plans to de-hypnotize Guillermo the next day.

== Production ==
=== Development ===
In September 2024, FX confirmed that the third episode of the season would be titled "Sleep Hypnosis", and that it would be written by co-executive producer Marika Sawyer, and directed by executive producer Yana Gorskaya. This was Sawyer's eighth writing credit, and Gorskaya's 18th directing credit.

=== Writing ===
Upon receiving the script, Kayvan Novak expressed surprise with its content, saying "When I first read it, I was like, ‘This is mad. Am I actually gonna sound like Richard Nixon?'”" To achieve it, Novak, an expert in mimicry, watched several clips of Nixon.

== Reception ==
=== Critical reviews ===
"Sleep Hypnosis" received critical acclaim. William Hughes of The A.V. Club gave the 3-episode premiere an "A–" grade and wrote, "If we'd come to the start of this season expecting some world-changing, life rearranging shake-ups to serve as the prelude for an epic finale, we might be a little miffed; approaching it as one last blessed run of one of TV's best comedies, though, and it's clear the show knows exactly what it needs to deliver for this final stretch."

Alan Sepinwall wrote, "The third episode, “Sleep Hypnosis,” was a spectacular bit of farce, with the basic idea — each vampire discovers that they can hypnotize one or more of their housemates while they slumber — escalating and escalating, and going into hilariously weird places, like Colin Robinson turning Nandor into a Richard Nixon impersonator." Katie Rife of Vulture gave the 3-episode premiere a 3 star rating out of 5 and wrote, "What We Do in the Shadows has done this itself several times, in the form of Guillermo's journey to become (and un-become) a vampire over the course of the series. And it does it again here in a jokey, self-aware fashion. The last reset is actually quite poignant: Guillermo accidentally sleep-hypnotizes himself into forgetting everything that's happened to him over the past couple of decades and arrives at the mansion to “apply” for a “job” as Nandor's familiar. So much has passed between the two of them that it'd be impossible to completely rewind their relationship without betraying Guillermo's character in particular. So this obviously won't stick. But Nandor — and the writers — decide not to snap him out of it right away and instead enjoy the moment. You can't return to a simpler time, as much as you might like. It's true in comedy writing and in life."

Proma Khosla of IndieWire wrote, "Episode 3 traps them all in the kind of cyclical sitcom goof that is just infinitely more delightful with this particular group of immortal bloodsuckers." Melody McCune of Telltale TV gave the 3-episode premiere a 4.5 star rating out of 5 and wrote, "Everyone brings their A-game for these first three episodes, but Kayvan Novak, Natasia Demetriou, and Matt Berry really shine. Novak, particularly, puts his impressive impression skills on display in episode three, “Sleep Hypnosis.” Harvey Guillén plays the perfect “straight man” to the vampires’ larger-than-life personalities, and his chemistry with Novak is off the charts."

=== Accolades ===
TVLine named Kayvan Novak as an honorable mention for the "Performer of the Week" for the week of October 26, 2024, for his performance in the episode. The site wrote, "We're already mourning the end of FX's supremely silly vampire comedy What We Do in the Shadows as it begins its final season, so we're trying to savor every last giggle — including those provided by Kayvan Novak's reliably hilarious turn as clueless vampire Nandor. Novak showed off his full comedic range in this week's third episode: Colin used sleep hypnosis to remind Nandor he is a fierce warrior, and Novak gleefully tapped into his primal side as Nandor reasserted his violent warlord status. Then he topped himself when Colin sleep-hypnotized Nandor into thinking he's Richard Nixon, with Novak employing a surprisingly spot-on Tricky Dick impression. The actors on Shadows are so consistently funny that it's easy to take them for granted, but we want to make sure to shine a bright light (though not sunlight, of course) on Novak's inspired slice of comic lunacy."
