= Pride Parade (What We Do in the Shadows) =

- What We Do in the Shadows episode
- Episode no.: Season 5 Episode 3
- Directed by: Yana Gorskaya
- Written by: Jake Bender; Zach Dunn
- Cinematography by: David A. Makin
- Editing by: Liza Cardinale; A.J. Dickerson
- Production code: XWS05003
- Original air date: July 20, 2023
- Running time: 26 minutes

Guest appearances
- Marissa Jaret Winokur as Charmaine Rinaldi; Anthony Atamanuik as Sean Rinaldi

Episode chronology
← Previous "A Night Out with the Guys"	Next → "The Campaign"

"Pride Parade" is the third episode of the fifth season of the American mockumentary comedy horror television series What We Do in the Shadows, set in the franchise of the same name. It is the 43rd overall episode of the series and was written by producers Jake Bender and Zach Dunn, and directed by co-executive producer Yana Gorskaya. It was released on FX on July 20, 2023.

The series is set in Staten Island, New York City. Like the 2014 film, the series follows the lives of vampires in the city. These consist of three vampires, Nandor, Laszlo, and Nadja. They live alongside Colin Robinson, an energy vampire; and Guillermo, Nandor's familiar. The series explores the absurdity and misfortunes experienced by the vampires. In the episode, the vampires help Sean with organizing a Pride Parade, while Nadja helps her ghost in achieving a dream.

According to Nielsen Media Research, the episode was seen by an estimated 0.251 million household viewers and gained a 0.09 ratings share among adults aged 18–49. The episode received extremely positive reviews from critics, who praised the episode's humor, originality and exploration of its mythology.

== Plot ==
Sean (Anthony Atamanuik) announces his intent to run as a comptroller in Staten Island. As he is tracking poorly with the gay demographic, Sean decides to host a pride parade. He asks the vampires for help, with Laszlo (Matt Berry) promising to help.

Guillermo (Harvey Guillén) confides to Laszlo that his bat wings have started to appear in his back. When Colin Robinson (Mark Proksch) talks about some vampiric traits, Laszlo and Nandor (Kayvan Novak) question his claims. They decide to test the myths, such as vampires counting rice, an increased jump on their third flight, and flying to outer space. Nadja (Natasia Demetriou) discovers that Nadja's Ghost laments remaining a virgin, as her spirit was captured before she was turned into a vampire. To make up for accidentally breaking her legs, Nadja accepts in body swapping with her so she can finally have sex. Nadja's Ghost goes to a bar in an attempt to speed date, but is unsuccessful in finding a person.

Guillermo is still resistant to light exposure, surprising Laszlo. Laszlo uses Guillermo's sweat in his skin, which surprisingly allows him to go outside during the day. Nadja's Ghost refuses to leave her body, so Colin Robinson suggests inserting himself into Nadja's body to reclaim it, which leads to a fight during the parade, but they eventually start singing "It's Raining Men", which is well received by the audience. During this, Nandor tests flying to outer space, eventually reaching it. However, he begins falling back to Earth, crashing into the parade as a fireball. Despite that, the parade proves to be a success. Later, Guillermo and Nandor stumble into a room, in which Nadja (still inside the doll) and Laszlo have sex with Nadja's Ghost and Colin Robinson.

== Production ==
=== Development ===
In June 2023, FX confirmed that the third episode of the season would be titled "Pride Parade", and that it would be written by producers Jake Bender and Zach Dunn, and directed by co-executive producer Yana Gorskaya. This was Bender's fourth writing credit, Dunn's fourth writing credit, and Gorskaya's 14th directing credit.

== Reception ==
=== Viewers ===
In its original American broadcast, "Pride Parade" was seen by an estimated 0.251 million household viewers with a 0.09 in the 18-49 demographics. This means that 0.09 percent of all households with televisions watched the episode. This was a 11% decrease in viewership from the previous episode, which was watched by 0.284 million household viewers with a 0.10 in the 18-49 demographics.

=== Critical reviews ===
"Pride Parade" received extremely positive reviews from critics. William Hughes of The A.V. Club gave the episode an "A" grade and wrote, "All of which is to say that 'Pride Parade' might be the most chaotic, out-there episode in the entire history of WWDITS's four-season run, a steady, relentless escalation in silliness that's also easily the show's funniest episode since last season's exceptional 'Private School.' Building from a few basic ideas, the episode is as unrelenting as Nandor himself. And, just like Nandor, it ends up shooting itself straight into the stratosphere in pursuit of these bold ambitions."

Katie Rife of Vulture gave the episode a 3 star rating out of 5 and wrote, "In the meantime, 'Pride Parade' deepens the show's vampire lore with one bit of folk wisdom I've read about before — namely, that a vampire will be compelled to count every grain of rice should they encounter a pile of it, a belief that actually comes from China — and a few more that were made up for the show. As far as I can tell, no human culture subscribes to the notion that if you throw a vampire's sock into a river, they have to jump in after it. And the idea that vampires are two-pump chumps was news to me: How are they having these all-night orgies, then?" Tony Sokol of Den of Geek wrote, "With an endorsement like that, how can we not love a 'Pride Parade' done in the shade of What We Do in the Shadows?"

Melody McCune of Telltale TV gave the episode a 4 star rating out of 5 and wrote, "Overall, 'Pride Parade' is a solid episode in the What We Do in the Shadows canon. It's unarguably one of the show's strongest. The outing takes a hilarious bite into vampire lore and mythology while giving the cast a chance to shine comedically. It's raunchy, irreverent, and bursting at the coffin with joy." Alejandra Bodden of Bleeding Cool gave the episode a 9 out of 10 rating and wrote, "I think this was one of the most surprising episodes of FX's What We Do in the Shadows'... and I loved every second of it."

IndieWire named "Pride Parade" the 21st best TV episode of 2023.
