= Headhunting (What We Do in the Shadows) =

- What We Do in the Shadows episode
- Episode no.: Season 6 Episode 2
- Directed by: Kyle Newacheck
- Written by: Jake Bender; Zach Dunn; Sam Johnson; Sarah Naftalis
- Cinematography by: Michael Storey
- Editing by: Liza Cardinale; Matthew Freund
- Production code: XWS06002
- Original air date: October 21, 2024
- Running time: 25 minutes

Guest appearances
- Tim Heidecker as Jordan; Andy Assaf as Cravensworth Monster; Aaron Fili as Adrian Bellamy; Rajat Suresh as Raj; Jeremy Levick as Jimmy

Episode chronology
← Previous "The Return of Jerry"	Next → "Sleep Hypnosis"

"Headhunting" is the second episode of the sixth season of the American mockumentary comedy horror television series What We Do in the Shadows, set in the franchise of the same name. It is the 52nd overall episode of the series and was written by supervising producer Jake Bender, supervising producer Zach Dunn, executive producer Sam Johnson, and executive producer Sarah Naftalis, and directed by executive producer Kyle Newacheck. It was released on FX on October 21, 2024, airing alongside the episodes "The Return of Jerry" and "Sleep Hypnosis".

The series is set in Staten Island, New York City. Like the 2014 film, the series follows the lives of vampires in the city. These consist of three vampires, Nandor, Laszlo, and Nadja. They live alongside Colin Robinson, an energy vampire; and Guillermo, Nandor's familiar. The series explores the absurdity and misfortunes experienced by the vampires. In the episode, Nadja and Nandor monitor Guillermo on his new job, while Laszlo and Colin Robinson try to reanimate an experiment.

According to Nielsen Media Research, the episode was seen by an estimated 0.130 million household viewers and gained a 0.04 ratings share among adults aged 18–49. The episode received mostly positive reviews from critics, with praise towards the humor, performances, production design and make-up.

== Plot ==
Laszlo (Matt Berry) re-opens his old laboratory, intending to reanimate a dead man through science. Colin Robinson (Mark Proksch) takes an interest in the experiment, and decides to help Laszlo, although he is constantly electrocuted by touching Laszlo's experiments.

Guillermo (Harvey Guillén) applies for a new job at the Financial District, working at the mail room for a private equity firm named Cannon Capital Strategies. However, he blocks the camera crew from getting in to his job. The crew however, manage to get in by convincing Guillermo's manager they are filming a documentary about office work. Nadja (Natasia Demetriou) believes that if the pressure gets to Guillermo, he will snap and kill the vampires, just like a familiar did some time ago. To ensure Guillermo is content with his job, Nadja sneaks into the offices and kills an assistant so Guillermo can take her spot, now working for senior partner Jordan (Tim Heidecker). While Guillermo is delighted, he is annoyed when he finds that Nandor (Kayvan Novak) now works in the building as a janitor to monitor him.

Laszlo and Colin Robinson pretend to be Uber drivers to find a perfect candidate to be the head of the experiment. After dropping many candidates, they settle on a man named Bill, beheading him. The experiment works, but the monster almost strangles Laszlo to death, forcing Colin Robinson to switch him off. Deeming it a failure, Laszlo abandons the experiment and disposes of the body parts. Nevertheless, Colin Robinson still believes there is potential in the project, and convinces Laszlo in allowing him to take another chance.

Nadja gets Jordan's boss, Adrian Bellamy (Aaron Fili), to attend a meeting at the building and then gets Guillermo to charm him. Seeing his preferences in Instagram, Guillermo wins over Adrian, and Jordan promotes Guillermo to analyst. After discussing with Nadja, Guillermo allows her and Nandor to monitor him if they stop interfering. Back at the house, Colin Robinson shows Laszlo that he is slowly training the Monster to adjust to his new world. Laszlo is pleased with the results, and allows Colin Robinson to keep the Monster.

== Production ==
=== Development ===
In September 2024, FX confirmed that the second episode of the season would be titled "Headhunting", and that it would be written by supervising producer Jake Bender, supervising producer Zach Dunn, executive producer Sam Johnson, and executive producer Sarah Naftalis, and directed by executive producer Kyle Newacheck. This was Bender's sixth writing credit, Dunn's sixth writing credit, Johnson's tenth writing credit, Naftalis' eighth writing credit, and Newacheck's 17th directing credit.

=== Writing ===
Regarding Laszlo focusing on his laboratory, Matt Berry commented, "This is something Laszlo does every 100 years or so, trying to create monsters [and forgetting about it]. It also made me laugh thinking about how we've never seen this lab, which is film-level stuff, but it's right past the basement's basement." He also added, "The set was probably the best set that I've ever stepped on. The attention to detail in every angle of that set was exceptional. The thought that had gone into the whole thing, it was as good as any movie set. And it caught fire one day, which was exciting."

== Reception ==
=== Viewers ===
In its original American broadcast, "Headhunting" was seen by an estimated 0.130 million household viewers with a 0.04 in the 18-49 demographics. This means that 0.04 percent of all households with televisions watched the episode. This was a 24% decrease in viewership from the previous episode, which was watched by 0.170 million household viewers with a 0.05 in the 18-49 demographics.

=== Critical reviews ===
"Headhunting" received mostly positive reviews from critics. William Hughes of The A.V. Club gave the 3-episode premiere an "A–" grade and wrote, "“Headhunting” is an all-time banger, driven by two potent forces the show has learned to marshal well since its 2019 premiere: a pair of A/B plots that play hard to the show's best impulses and a focus that confines its characters to two of its best pairings (Guillermo and Nadja [ft. Nandor] on the one hand, and the ever-reliable Colin Robinson/Laszlo team-up on the other)."

Alan Sepinwall wrote, "Episode Two introduced an inspired new setting for the show, with Guillermo getting a job at a venture capital firm, and Nandor and Nadja deciding to work there too to help his career advance. The intersection of the vamps and modern culture has been one of the series' best sources of humor, and this trip to the worst of corporate America was no exception." Katie Rife of Vulture gave the 3-episode premiere a 3 star rating out of 5 and wrote, "The retro vibes are also all over the workplace subplot established in episode two, “Headhunting,” which brings us Nadja exercising her power as an independent woman of the '80s in shimmery eye shadow, a tight perm, and a pussy bow."

Proma Khosla of IndieWire wrote, "On the surface, each episode premise is a fun experiment, a new adventure, a chance to try something that the show hasn't done before within the confines of 30 minutes. But go a little deeper and you'll find that capital-f Final Season spirit. There are questions asked and answered which have been hovering for years. There's nostalgia and wish fulfillment, and various opportunities (temptations, even) to reset the entire narrative and return to the comfort of equilibrium — but this has never been a show to shy away from a challenge." Melody McCune of Telltale TV gave the 3-episode premiere a 4.5 star rating out of 5 and wrote, "Guillermo's adjustment to the human world after spending 15 years with vampires certainly reinvigorates the overarching narrative. Sprinkle in Nadja and Nandor's attempts to “prevent” him from turning on them, and you've got a hilarious B-plot in episode two, “Headhunting.” It's always a good time when the vamps have to act like humans. Exhibit A: Jackie Daytona, regular human bartender."
