= The Railroad (What We Do in the Shadows) =

- What We Do in the Shadows episode
- Episode no.: Season 6 Episode 4
- Directed by: Kyle Newacheck
- Written by: Sam Johnson; Chris Marcil
- Cinematography by: Michael Storey
- Editing by: Liza Cardinale; Matthew Freund
- Production code: XWS06004
- Original air date: October 28, 2024
- Running time: 26 minutes

Guest appearances
- Anthony Atamanuik as Sean Rinaldi; Tim Heidecker as Jordan; Mike O'Brien as Jerry; Andy Assaf as Cravensworth's Monster; Rajat Suresh as Raj; Jeremy Levick as Jimmy

Episode chronology
← Previous "Sleep Hypnosis"	Next → "Nandor's Army"

"The Railroad" is the fourth episode of the sixth season of the American mockumentary comedy horror television series What We Do in the Shadows, set in the franchise of the same name. It is the 54th overall episode of the series and was written by Sam Johnson and Chris Marcil, and directed by executive producer Kyle Newacheck. It was released on FX on October 28, 2024.

The series is set in Staten Island, New York City. Like the 2014 film, the series follows the lives of vampires in the city. These consist of three vampires, Nandor, Laszlo, and Nadja. They live alongside Colin Robinson, an energy vampire; and Guillermo, Nandor's familiar. The series explores the absurdity and misfortunes experienced by the vampires. In the episode, Laszlo tries to help Sean with finding a job, while Guillermo faces a dilemma in Cannon Capital.

According to Nielsen Media Research, the episode was seen by an estimated 0.131 million household viewers and gained a 0.03 ratings share among adults aged 18–49. The episode received mostly positive reviews from critics, who praised the humor, performances and ending.

== Plot ==
Jerry (Mike O'Brien) fails to get the vampires to take seriously his plan to conquer the New World. Nandor (Kayvan Novak) and Nadja (Natasia Demetriou) are still working at Cannon Capital Strategies, with Nadja using her powers to get Guillermo (Harvey Guillén) to get promotions.

While working on the Monster, Laszlo (Matt Berry) is visited by Sean (Anthony Atamanuik), who has lost his job. He asks Laszlo to arrange a job interview at a railroad, as Laszlo lied by claiming he worked at a railroad to justify his constant absences. Laszlo promises to get him an interview, telling Colin Robinson (Mark Proksch) he cannot hypnotize Sean to forget about it as his contant hypnoses are making Sean even dumber. Laszlo and Colin Robinson create the "Staten Island and Southwestern Railroad" in a rented apartment, hiring actors to pretend to be workers, with the Monster acting as the boss. Sean has his interview, and the Monster deviates from Laszlo's instructions and makes Sean Vice-President.

Annoyed by Nandor's personality, Jordan (Tim Heidecker) asks Guillermo to fire Nandor, but he cannot bring himself to do it. Instead, he tells Nandor that he must disappear in the background to avoid being seen. Guillermo later accompanies Jordan to a dinner with the company's high-level workers, impressing them and earning their respect, unaware that Nandor is seeing it from outside. Guillermo also gets into an argument with Nadja after finding that she helped him climb the company's ladder, to which he says he does not need her.

Nadja interrupts a meeting with Jordan's partners and brings them to the railroad estate so they can consider buying it, but they easily see that everything in the department is false. However, they gain interest in the property when they realize it is undervalued and end up acquiring it. Laszlo offers Sean a new chance at work in the new railroad, but he feels that the company does not deserve him and decides to go work for Taskrabbit. Noting that he has not fired Nandor, Jordan demands Guillermo act immediately. Guillermo finally breaks the news to Nandor, who takes it quite well. However, he later rants at the documentary crew to stop filming him while he leaves the building.

== Production ==
=== Development ===
In October 2024, FX confirmed that the fourth episode of the season would be titled "The Railroad", and that it would be written by Sam Johnson and Chris Marcil, and directed by executive producer Kyle Newacheck. This was Johnson's 11th writing credit, Marcil's fifth writing credit, and Newacheck's 18th directing credit.

== Reception ==
=== Viewers ===
In its original American broadcast, "The Railroad" was seen by an estimated 0.131 million household viewers with a 0.03 in the 18-49 demographics. This means that 0.03 percent of all households with televisions watched the episode.

=== Critical reviews ===
"The Railroad" received highly positive reviews from critics. William Hughes of The A.V. Club gave the episode an "A" grade and wrote, "Laszlo Cravensworth's good-time boyyh makes any episode he appears in better pretty much automatically, not just because Atamanuik is a gifted comic performer, but because of how he alters our existing characters. Even beyond Laszlo, who's never more charming and affable than when in Sean's orbit, the character's genial nature and hypnosis-resistant brain puts all the vamps on their awful versions of their best behaviors. All of which is an admittedly long-winded way of saying that “The Railroad,” being basically a sequel to “Headhunting” (already the best episode of Shadows' season-opening three-parter) except with Sean in it, is an instant classic installment of this series."

Katie Rife of Vulture gave the episode a 3 star rating out of 5 and wrote, "When Jordan tells him to fire Nandor, his former master, from his janitor position, he's forced to choose a side. I can't help but wonder who and what Guillermo would be if he wasn't serving as a master. For now, he doesn't seem to be in a rush to find out."

Alejandra Bodden of Bleeding Cool gave the episode a 9 star rating out of 10 and wrote, "The fourth installment of FX's What We Do in the Shadows Season 6, "The Railroad," was much more of an emotional shocker than I was expecting. The episode had me laughing and even got me to tear up. It is crazy to think how much things have changed since it first started and how much all our characters have grown along the way." Melody McCune of Telltale TV gave the episode a 4 star rating out of 5 and wrote, "While the outing isn't quite as strong as the solid three-episode premiere, it's still a ton of fun. Even a weaker episode of What We Do in the Shadows is leagues better than most sitcoms."
