= The Roast (What We Do in the Shadows) =

- What We Do in the Shadows episode
- Episode no.: Season 5 Episode 8
- Directed by: Tig Fong
- Written by: Sarah Naftalis; Lauren Wells
- Cinematography by: Michael Storey
- Editing by: A.J. Dickerson
- Production code: XWS05008
- Original air date: August 24, 2023
- Running time: 28 minutes

Guest appearances
- Doug Jones as Baron Afanas; Anthony Atamanuik as Sean Rinaldi

Episode chronology
← Previous "Hybrid Creatures"	Next → "A Weekend at Morrigan Manor"

"The Roast" is the eighth episode of the fifth season of the American mockumentary comedy horror television series What We Do in the Shadows, set in the franchise of the same name. It is the 48th overall episode of the series and was written by supervising producer Sarah Naftalis and Lauren Wells, and directed by Tig Fong. It was released on FX on August 24, 2023.

The series is set in Staten Island, New York City. Like the 2014 film, the series follows the lives of vampires in the city. These consist of three vampires, Nandor, Laszlo, and Nadja. They live alongside Colin Robinson, an energy vampire; and Guillermo, Nandor's familiar. The series explores the absurdity and misfortunes experienced by the vampires. In the episode, the vampires decide to throw a roast for Laszlo, who appears to be depressive.

According to Nielsen Media Research, the episode was seen by an estimated 0.291 million household viewers and gained a 0.09 ratings share among adults aged 18–49. The episode received mostly positive reviews from critics, who praised Doug Jones' performance and humor, although some were frustrated with the lack of progress in Guillermo's secret.

== Plot ==
The vampires note that Laszlo (Matt Berry) has become withdrawn and unresponsive. He spends most of the time sitting in a chair and doing nothing, even when the others try to cheer him up. In an attempt to lift his spirits, Colin Robinson (Mark Proksch) suggests throwing him a roast, although it was the Guide's (Kristen Schaal) idea originally, but she was ignored.

For the roast, the vampires invite many guests, including Baron Afanas (Doug Jones), Sean (Anthony Atamanuik) and random pedestrians picked from the street to fill the empty chairs. The event proves to be a mild event, with few jokes landing among the crowd, and the Guide needs to explain the context to the Baron. However, she accidentally reveals that not only is Guillermo (Harvey Guillén) the one who exposed the Baron to the sunlight that almost killed him, but also that Guillermo's family bloodline is descended from Van Helsing. This prompts the Baron to take over the roast, condemning the vampires for not taking part in their old traditions, saying that they "have all gone soft."

The Baron then reveals that the vampires are harboring a vampire killer, exposing Guillermo in front of everyone as the human who tried to kill him. He then pursues Guillermo through the house, with Guillermo stabbing him in the arm with a stake to run away from him. As Nandor (Kayvan Novak) and Nadja (Natasia Demetriou) wonder what to do, they recognize that the Baron's death will result in their deaths as they were turned by him. Instead, they capture both Guillermo and the Baron, tie them to chairs and have them face each other. When Nandor leaves the room, Guillermo confesses that he was turned by a vampire. The Baron is ecstatic, until he realizes it was not Nandor. He decides to spare Guillermo, feeling he has bigger problems ahead. Before leaving, he tells Guillermo that he should tell Nandor about it even if he decides to kill him, as it will not be hidden forever. Guillermo then opens the door, accidentally exposing the Baron to sunlight again, burning him.

After the Baron sleeps for the day, he prepares to kill Guillermo. Nandor pleads for mercy, citing Guillermo's loyalty, but the Baron does not buy it. Laszlo then gives away Guillermo's location at the toolshed, so the Baron finds and kills him. As Nandor laments the loss, Laszlo concludes it is not Guillermo. He opens his stomach and discovers that it is actually one of the hybrids. The Baron eventually decides to spare Guillermo, feeling that the Baron himself is the one to "go soft" after his life living in the suburbs of New Jersey. At his casket, Nandor finds Guillermo hidden. After verifying he is the real Guillermo, Nandor states that he knows him better than anyone, making him uncomfortable. As the hybrid spawned more babies, Laszlo and Nadja send them to live in the suburbs, with the Baron and the Sire. This causes the Baron to regain his confidence and feel more terrifying to his neighbors. Back at the house, Laszlo reveals to Nadja that the reason behind his unresponsive state was because he was thinking about which order to organize their book collection.

== Production ==
=== Development ===
In July 2023, FX confirmed that the eighth episode of the season would be titled "The Roast", and that it would be written by supervising producer Sarah Naftalis and Lauren Wells, and directed by Tig Fong. This was Naftalis' sixth writing credit, Wells' second writing credit, and Fong's third directing credit.

== Reception ==
=== Viewers ===
In its original American broadcast, "The Roast" was seen by an estimated 0.291 million household viewers with a 0.09 in the 18-49 demographics. This means that 0.10 percent of all households with televisions watched the episode. This was a 17% decrease in viewership from the previous episode, which was watched by 0.350 million household viewers with a 0.10 in the 18-49 demographics.

=== Critical reviews ===
"The Roast" received mostly positive reviews from critics. William Hughes of The A.V. Club gave the episode a "B+" grade and wrote, "The upshot is that 'The Roast' absolutely works — in a vacuum. It's only when viewed as part of a piece of lightly serialized storytelling that certain elements start to grate, especially the frequent, insistent reminders that Nandor will kill Guillermo, and then himself, when he finds out the truth — which he's clearly not going to do until the last possible moment of the season. The fact that Laszlo's depression turns out to have nothing to do with all this season-arc bullshit feels like at least a wink to how silly caring about the long-term plot on this show is. But that doesn't make the repetition any less of a drag, or make us wish for a show that would stop teasing and just apply its same bold principles to its long-form storytelling as it does to its hilarious, shocking in-the-moment work."

Katie Rife of Vulture gave the episode a 3 star rating out of 5 and wrote, "Different episodes of What We Do in the Shadows focus on different aspects of the series. Some are more character-based, while others just revel in goofy jokes. Still others are intent on moving the plot forward or on expanding the show's take on vampire lore. 'The Roast' has elements of all of these. But more than anything, it's a showcase for the show's makeup and visual effects departments, who I imagine spent a significant portion of their budgets for the season on this week's episode." Proma Khosla of IndieWire wrote, "What We Do in the Shadows is nothing if not a skilled sitcom, and the writers manage to expertly maneuver us back to equilibrium. Lazslo's funk, Baron's ire, Guillermo's attempts to flee, and the Guide's clumsy secret keeping are all resolved in under 30 minutes, and life at the Staten Island manor resumes — with only Nandor left in the dark about Guillermo's big secret."

Melody McCune of Telltale TV gave the episode a 4 star rating out of 5 and wrote, "'The Roast' is a nice mix of high-stakes action and the show's trademark quippy, dark humor. It lays the groundwork for the double-episode season finale, where all bets will undoubtedly be off as Nandor learns about Guillermo's actual secret. It'll be undead mayhem personified, as only What We Do in the Shadows can deliver (with a healthy dose of Gothic flair)." Alejandra Bodden of Bleeding Cool gave the episode an 8.5 out of 10 rating and wrote, "This week's episode of FX's What We Do in the Shadows, 'The Roast,' was a fantastic episode on a whole new level. It definitely takes the story and the characters to another level."

=== Accolades ===
TVLine named Doug Jones as an honorable mention as the "Performer of the Week" for the week of August 26, 2023, for his performance in the episode. The site wrote, "We could not let this week go by without giving props to Doug Jones, who enjoyed his best and biggest What We Do in the Shadows showcase yet at 'The Roast.' Baron Afanas was but an attendee of the titular tribute to Lazlo, but once the he got wind of A) Guillermo's Van Helsing roots and B) the fact that it was Nandors familiar who nearly killed him back in Season 1, all bets were off. Jones made a delicious meal of what followed, as the Baron not only targeted Guillermo but also chided the roommates for being an 'embarrassment to the wery word wampire!' (Call us easy, but every time Jones swaps a V with a W, it makes us titter; he also makes the Baron's pronunciation of words like 'sticky' hilarious in their own right.) Between his flamboyant gesticulations, dramatic cocks of head and what we guess we will call 'mouth acting,' Jones 100% slayed us."
