= Urgent Care (What We Do in the Shadows) =

- What We Do in the Shadows episode
- Episode no.: Season 5 Episode 6
- Directed by: Yana Gorskaya
- Written by: Sam Johnson and Chris Marcil
- Cinematography by: David A. Makin
- Editing by: Dane McMaster
- Production code: XWS05006
- Original air date: August 10, 2023
- Running time: 25 minutes

Guest appearances
- John Slattery as Himself; Wayne Federman as Doctor

Episode chronology
← Previous "Local News"	Next → "Hybrid Creatures"

"Urgent Care" is the sixth episode of the fifth season of the American mockumentary comedy horror television series What We Do in the Shadows, set in the franchise of the same name. It is the 46th overall episode of the series and was written by Sam Johnson and Chris Marcil, and directed by co-executive producer Yana Gorskaya. It was released on FX on August 10, 2023.

The series is set in Staten Island, New York City. Like the 2014 film, the series follows the lives of vampires in the city. These consist of three vampires, Nandor, Laszlo, and Nadja. They live alongside Colin Robinson, an energy vampire; and Guillermo, Nandor's familiar. The series explores the absurdity and misfortunes experienced by the vampires. In the episode, Guillermo is taken to the hospital when he breaks his foot, while Colin Robinson starts losing energy.

According to Nielsen Media Research, the episode was seen by an estimated 0.267 million household viewers and gained a 0.09 ratings share among adults aged 18–49. The episode received extremely positive reviews from critics, who praised the humor, storylines and performances.

== Plot ==
Laszlo (Matt Berry) shows Guillermo (Harvey Guillén) that he injected Guillermo's blood inside frogs, allowing them to fly. He decides to test Guillermo by having him fly as well. Guillermo tries, having success at first. However, when Nandor (Kayvan Novak) is heard nearby, Guillermo panics and falls, breaking a foot.

While Nadja (Natasia Demetriou) takes Guillermo to the hospital, Laszlo and Nandor try to help Colin Robinson (Mark Proksch) whose energy-draining powers are now failing him, as he now has a black eye which make him seem interesting to people. Nandor's plan is to cover the bruise with make-up and take Colin Robinson to the streets so he can feed from people, but the situation worsens when Colin Robinson is hit by a car, prompting people to film the accident and making Colin Robinson even more interesting. The driver, actor John Slattery, offers to take them to the hospital, with Nandor deciding they should accept so that Colin Robinson can feed off Slattery. Colin Robinson tries to feed off Slattery, but Slattery is more interested in imitating Colin Robinson's accent. When it becomes clear that Slattery is deviating from their route, Colin Robinson and Nandor jump out of the car.

Guillermo is worried about Nadja taking him to a doctor, as he fears his vampiric nature will be revealed. To complicate matters, Nadja is not taking him to a regular hospital, but to the Familiar Urgent Care hospital, which is hidden in a vet office. While Guillermo is sedated, Nadja is informed by the doctor (Wayne Federman) that Guillermo's test will have to be redone due to a weird blood stat. Thinking that they will find his connection to Van Helsing, Nadja sneaks in to retrieve Guillermo, only to be stopped by the doctor. The doctor reveals that Guillermo was turned and that he will have to kill him as he cannot allow him to walk in the streets. Nadja searches the hospital until she finds Guillermo and engages in a fight with the doctor. Just as Nadja is about to lose the fight, Guillermo uses his powers to break free and injects the doctor with his own poison.

Nandor and Colin Robinson arrive at a grocery store, hoping to feed on the customers, just as a robbery takes place. However, the robber gets distracted by Colin Robinson's presence, as he went viral on TikTok, allowing the store owner to knock the robber unconscious. Unfortunately all of this makes Colin Robinson even more interesting and so, unable to feed, he faints as his condition worsens. Nandor hurriedly takes him back to their house, where Laszlo places them both in a machine, which allows them to transfer their energy. Colin Robinson recovers, but Nandor has lost all energy and does not wake up. Colin Robinson manages to wake him up by opening up about his past, including revealing his real name, Arthur Simon Santino, which he was forced to change as the initials (A.S.S.) would mock him. Nadja arrives with Guillermo, angry that he allowed Derek to turn him, while Laszlo tries to calm her by claiming he is working on reverting the transformation so Nandor can turn him. Nandor then appears, with Nadja covering for Guillermo. Nandor also discovers the frogs, noting that they look similarly to Guillermo. Later, Laszlo finds that the frogs can now say, "Guillermo".

== Production ==
=== Development ===
In July 2023, FX confirmed that the sixth episode of the season would be titled "Urgent Care", and that it would be written by Sam Johnson and Chris Marcil, and directed by co-executive producer Yana Gorskaya. This was Johnson's eighth writing credit, Marcil's fourth writing credit, and Gorskaya's 17th directing credit.

== Reception ==
=== Viewers ===
In its original American broadcast, "Urgent Care" was seen by an estimated 0.267 million household viewers with a 0.09 in the 18-49 demographics. This means that 0.09 percent of all households with televisions watched the episode. This was a slight decrease in viewership from the previous episode, which was watched by 0.284 million household viewers with a 0.08 in the 18-49 demographics.

=== Critical reviews ===
"Urgent Care" received extremely positive reviews from critics. William Hughes of The A.V. Club gave the episode an "A" grade and wrote, "The great thing about 'Urgent Care,' honestly, is that there's just no fat on the damn thing: The Colin Robinson plotline moves from joke to joke swiftly, while the Guillermo story provides yet another new insight into how hideously dark the vampire-familiar relationship can be."

Katie Rife of Vulture gave the episode a 3 star rating out of 5 and wrote, "In terms of recurring WWDITS bits, 'Urgent Care' played the hits to a certain extent: Matt Berry enunciating colorful euphemisms for various sex acts. The Guide feeding a stray familiar chunks of raw chicken. But these familiar details were used in service of new settings, situations, and plots. Even when this week's episode was messy, it was still trying new things. And in the fifth season of a sitcom, that's essential if a series is going to survive." Proma Khosla of IndieWire gave the episode a "B+" grade and wrote, "Dramatic irony is a time-honored sitcom tradition, and What We Do in the Shadows will make spectacular use of it, just like it makes spectacular use of everything else. And even if the anticipated set-up does not come to pass, the show has my blessing for it in perpetuity."

Tony Sokol of Den of Geek wrote, "'Urgent Care' shows how tight the small vampire unit is, under the surface. Though the sanguinary vampires treat the energy vampire as a lesser monster, and the familiar Guillermo as an unbroken pet, they all come together in times of crisis. It makes for a satisfying feed." Melody McCune of Telltale TV gave the episode a 4 star rating out of 5 and wrote, "Overall, 'Urgent Care' catapults the (non-wooden) stakes for the season with performances that sing across the comedic board. The story never sags or wanes on the excitement front. As usual, the outing is driven by these beloved characters we know so well and the rich, immersive world in which they live." Alejandra Bodden of Bleeding Cool gave the episode a perfect 10 out of 10 rating and wrote, "This week's episode of FX's What We Do in the Shadows, "Urgent Care," was yet another fantastic episode that shows how far along our vampires have come along."
