= The Campaign (What We Do in the Shadows) =

- What We Do in the Shadows episode
- Episode no.: Season 5 Episode 4
- Directed by: Yana Gorskaya
- Written by: Max Brockman; Shana Gohd
- Cinematography by: David A. Makin
- Editing by: Dane McMaster
- Production code: XWS05004
- Original air date: July 27, 2023
- Running time: 25 minutes

Guest appearances
- Vanessa Bayer as Evie Russell; Martha Kelly as Martha; Hannibal Buress as Hannibal; Anthony Atamanuik as Sean Rinaldi; Marceline Hugot as Barbara Lazarro; Robert Smigel as Alexander

Episode chronology
← Previous "Pride Parade"	Next → "Local News"

"The Campaign" is the fourth episode of the fifth season of the American mockumentary comedy horror television series What We Do in the Shadows, set in the franchise of the same name. It is the 44th overall episode of the series and was written by producers Max Brockman and Shana Gohd, and directed by co-executive producer Yana Gorskaya. It was released on FX on July 27, 2023.

The series is set in Staten Island, New York City. Like the 2014 film, the series follows the lives of vampires in the city. These consist of three vampires, Nandor, Laszlo, and Nadja. They live alongside Colin Robinson, an energy vampire; and Guillermo, Nandor's familiar. The series explores the absurdity and misfortunes experienced by the vampires. In the episode, Colin Robinson runs for comptroller and reconnects with Evie. Meanwhile, Nandor makes a new friend at the gym, and Laszlo tries to impress Nadja's new friends.

According to Nielsen Media Research, the episode was seen by an estimated 0.268 million household viewers and gained a 0.11 ratings share among adults aged 18–49. The episode received mixed reviews, with critics feeling that the episode felt derivative of previous installments.

== Plot ==
Colin Robinson (Mark Proksch) has decided to run for comptroller in Staten Island, as Sean (Anthony Atamanuik) was forced to drop out due to multiple DUI incidents. However, Colin Robinson's place is questioned by his opponent Barbara Lazarro (Marceline Hugot), whom he will face in a debate. However, Colin Robinson is not interested in the position, as he only wants to take place in the debate to drain people.

Nandor (Kayvan Novak) has joined a gym. He has tried to get Guillermo (Harvey Guillén) to go with him, but he is avoiding Nandor to not reveal his quasi-vampiric nature. At the gym, he befriends an attendee, Alexander. He establishes a friendship, with Nandor telling the vampires that he is interested in Alexander because he is Jewish. To impress Alexander, Nandor forces Guillermo to perform a circumcision on him. Nadja (Natasia Demetriou) continues visiting Little Antipaxos, befriending a family of locals. However, the locals want to meet her husband and Nadja is embarrassed to present Laszlo (Matt Berry). Laszlo makes a poor impression on the first encounter, and it worsens when he sings a song from their enemy country.

Nandor shows his circumcision to Alexander, which has healed over, but Alexander feels disgusted and ends their friendship. With this, Nandor decides to go out to the movies with Guillermo. Laszlo returns to Little Antipaxos, describing all his acts and finishing by insulting the family. Suddenly, the family praises Laszlo, as they believe him to be a reincarnation of a known "perverted oaf" tale and his presence means good luck.

To get help, Colin Robinson attends a break-up support group, where Evie (Vanessa Bayer) is present. He reconnects with her, and both work during the debate. As Colin Robinson gives a lengthy speech, Evie feeds on the audience's sympathy. After the debate's end, Colin Robinson and Evie are kidnapped and taken to a soulless office, where they are subjugated to an emergency meeting of the Supreme Council of Energy Vampires. Council chair Martha (Martha Kelly) insists Colin Robinson win the election to maintain the lifeblood of energy vampires; he reluctantly accepts.

However, the pressure of the campaign is too much for Colin Robinson, so he sabotages himself by “accidentally” exposing himself to online supporters. Evie takes over his position, which she wins thanks to the support group. She informs Colin Robinson that she is ending their relationship.

== Production ==
=== Development ===
In June 2023, FX confirmed that the fourth episode of the season would be titled "The Campaign", and that it would be written by producers Max Brockman and Shana Gohd, and directed by co-executive producer Yana Gorskaya. This was Brockman's first writing credit, Gohd's fourth writing credit, and Gorskaya's 15th directing credit.

== Reception ==
=== Viewers ===
In its original American broadcast, "The Campaign" was seen by an estimated 0.268 million household viewers with a 0.11 in the 18-49 demographics. This means that 0.11 percent of all households with televisions watched the episode. This was a slight increase in viewership from the previous episode, which was watched by 0.251 million household viewers with a 0.09 in the 18-49 demographics.

=== Critical reviews ===
"The Campaign" received mixed reviews from critics. William Hughes of The A.V. Club gave the episode a "C+" grade and wrote, "It feels telling that the two episodes 'The Campaign' spends most of its time referencing are both from What We Do In The Shadows' first season, because there's a certain first-season-ness to everything that happens tonight. WWDITS took less time to find its feet than lots of TV comedies, but it still struggled at first with the perceived need to play by the rules of television — hang-ups the show has discarded, to gleeful effect, in subsequent years. 'The Campaign' is a throwback to those less-confident times and a low point in an otherwise excellent season so far."

Katie Rife of Vulture gave the episode a 3 star rating out of 5 and wrote, "In terms of jokes, every character had a moment this week that made me laugh out loud. [...] The only problem is that What We Do in the Shadows is starting to repeat itself. Along with the callbacks I've already mentioned in the Colin story line, Nandor already had a gym-rat phase back in season three. As long as the laughs keep coming, I suppose it doesn't really matter if we keep going back to the same scenarios — this is a sitcom, after all. But, as with our vampire protagonists, there's a real risk of getting stuck in a rut if season five keeps looking to the past for ideas." Proma Khosla of IndieWire gave the episode an "A–" grade and wrote, "The debate scene is not only a master class in vampire power plays, but in Proksch and Bayer sucking the marrow from two roles that require meticulous patience and timing, with every pause and fumble captured expertly by Gorskaya's team."

Tony Sokol of Den of Geek wrote, "All politics are local, whether courting the dozens of votes to be cast for local paper-pushers, or assimilating a mythologically pompous buffoon into a tight family gathering. With no discernable competition for a mandate, 'The Campaign' concedes in a landslide." Melody McCune of Telltale TV gave the episode a 3 star rating out of 5 and wrote, "'The Campaign' won't make any 'best episode' lists for What We Do in the Shadows, but even a tepid outing is still more entertaining than most sitcoms nowadays. Mark Proksch gets plenty of hysterical comedic beats, with the Supreme Council of Energy Vampires making their monotone debut and Laszlo proving he can befriend anyone as a master, ahem, cocksman." Alejandra Bodden of Bleeding Cool gave the episode a 9.5 out of 10 rating and wrote, "This week's episode of FX's What We Do in the Shadows, "The Campaign," was fantastic and filled with surprises. Every second was enjoyable and shows us that one of our favorite vampires is not as alone in the world as we thought, but what could this mean in the future? It has been great to see the universe grow slowly around them as well as the lore itself."

=== Accolades ===
TVLine named Mark Proksch as an honorable mention as the "Performer of the Week" for the week of July 29, 2023, for his performance in the episode. The site wrote, "Mark Proksch is reliably hilarious as What We Do in the Shadows' resident energy vampire Colin Robinson, and he sunk his teeth into a meaty spotlight this week as Colin found the perfect setting for his lethally dull personality: politics. Colin ran for city comptroller, and Proksch was delightfully deadpan as Colin took pleasure in boring Staten Island voters to tears with a mind-numbingly endless debate speech. Colin also reunited with his ex Evie, the emotional vampire played to perfection by guest star Vanessa Bayer, whose presence brought an extra pep to Proksch's step. When it comes to the funniest supporting performances anywhere on TV, Proksch always gets our vote."
