= A Weekend at Morrigan Manor =

- What We Do in the Shadows episode
- Episode no.: Season 5 Episode 9
- Directed by: Kyle Newacheck
- Written by: William Meny; Paul Simms
- Cinematography by: Kim Derko
- Editing by: Dane McMaster
- Production code: XWS05009
- Original air date: August 31, 2023
- Running time: 26 minutes

Episode chronology
← Previous "The Roast"	Next → "Exit Interview"

"A Weekend at Morrigan Manor" is the ninth episode of the fifth season of the American mockumentary comedy horror television series What We Do in the Shadows, set in the franchise of the same name. It is the 49th overall episode of the series and was written by producer William Meny and executive producer Paul Simms, and directed by co-executive producer Kyle Newacheck. It was released on FX on August 31, 2023, airing back-to-back with the follow-up episode "Exit Interview".

The series is set in Staten Island, New York City. Like the 2014 film, the series follows the lives of vampires in the city. These consist of three vampires, Nandor, Laszlo, and Nadja. They live alongside Colin Robinson, an energy vampire; and Guillermo, Nandor's familiar. The series explores the absurdity and misfortunes experienced by the vampires. In the episode, the vampires visit a wealthy vampire's manor, where they experience strange events.

According to Nielsen Media Research, the episode was seen by an estimated 0.239 million household viewers and gained a 0.07 ratings share among adults aged 18–49. The episode received mixed-to-positive reviews from critics, who praised Kristen Schaal's performance, but criticized the writing.

== Plot ==
The Guide (Kristen Schaal) invites the vampires to her art gallery opening, but they aren't interested. She then gives them an invitation from Perdita Morrigan, the grand dame of vampiric high society in America, who invites them for a weekend at her estate, Morrigan Manor.

At the manor, the vampires find a recording from Perdita, who states she is not in the house but invites them to enjoy the rooms. Even though Perdita declares that the manor is "a treacherous place", the vampires ignore this warning. During their stay, the Guide tries to show portraits she had painted of each of them, but they show no interest and even mock her artwork. Things take a turn, when Laszlo (Matt Berry) is attacked by an ever-increasing number of fencing opponents and then disappears. Next, while Nadja (Natasia Demetriou) and the Guide search for Lazlo, Nadja falls into a trap in the stairs and then she disappears.

During a game in which naked humans are released in the Manor's grounds to be hunted, Nandor (Kayvan Novak) asks Guillermo (Harvey Guillén) to help. Guillermo agrees to help, but actually escapes back to the Manor while Nandor goes hunting by himself. He runs into the Guide, who is caught in a bear trap. However, Nandor flees when the humans rebel against them, only to be captured by a net. The Guide escapes to inform Guillermo and Colin Robinson (Mark Proksch) about the disappearance. When Colin Robinson continues to ignore her, the Guide presses a button which causes Colin Robinson to fall through a passageway, revealing she orchestrated everything.

The Guide takes Guillermo to the basement, where the vampires are kept in silver cages. She impersonated Perdita's voice and took over the Manor while she left. She wanted to punish the vampires for ignoring her and mistreating her, intending for them to last an eternity in their cages, also revealing that she lied to Nadja about her hex. She spares Guillermo for always showing respect, further noting how he took matters into his own hands to get what he wanted, which confuses Nandor. Guillermo eventually admits to Nandor that Derek turned him into a vampire. Nandor appreciates his honesty but warns him he will eventually kill Guillermo and then kill himself, also revealing that the reason why Guillermo is not a full vampire yet, is because of his Van Helsing heritage fighting his vampiric cells.

Laszlo then asks the documentary crew to show footage of a meeting in which the vampires complimented the Guide, explaining that they only talked badly about her because of their vampiric nature. She decides to release them, but Nandor states he plans to kill Guillermo. Laszlo takes over the keys, allowing Guillermo to get a head start to escape. Guillermo transforms into a bat and flees, while Nandor calls him out. During the credits, more footage reveals that the reason everyone heaped compliments on the Guide, was to trick Colin Robinson into dating her and eventually for him move out of the house, but he sees through the ruse.

== Production ==
=== Development ===
In August 2023, FX confirmed that the ninth episode of the season would be titled "A Weekend at Morrigan Manor", and that it would be written by producer William Meny and executive producer Paul Simms, and directed by co-executive producer Kyle Newacheck. This was Meny's fourth writing credit, Simms' 13th writing credit, and Newacheck's 15th directing credit.

=== Writing ===
Yana Gorskaya explained the Guide's actions in the episode, "She's sort of the queen of not keeping a secret. It's a lovely writing thing. They managed to do this in some way every season where [there's a thread] and you have a feeling that something is off about a character. In this case with Kristen, her being such a cameo character and being actively ignored... to have that payoff in this mastermind episode is so fun."

== Reception ==
=== Viewers ===
In its original American broadcast, "A Weekend at Morrigan Manor" was seen by an estimated 0.239 million household viewers with a 0.07 in the 18-49 demographics. This means that 0.07 percent of all households with televisions watched the episode. This was a 18% decrease in viewership from the previous episode, which was watched by 0.291 million household viewers with a 0.09 in the 18-49 demographics.

=== Critical reviews ===
"A Weekend at Morrigan Manor" received mixed-to-positive reviews from critics. William Hughes of The A.V. Club gave the episode a "C+" grade and wrote, "The big issue, really, is The Guide herself. Kristen Schaal is a genius, responsible for some of the funniest, and most heartbreaking, TV moments of the last decade. But across this entire season, The Guide has had one joke, told ad nauseum [sic], to her name: She meekly makes a statement about wanting to be included; the other vamps ignore her; she shoots a sad look at the camera. That's it, and 'A Weekend At Morrigan Manor' tells the one joke so aggressively, so often, and with so little variation, that it starts to feel genuinely baffling that the show thinks the gag has this much staying power."

Katie Rife of Vulture gave the episode a 3 star rating out of 5 and wrote, "Will this actually be the end of the will they/won't they tension that's propelled this entire series over five seasons? It's hard to take the threat that seriously, given that we've been here before. Will What We Do in the Shadows once again go for a sitcom reset, or will the show's love of an ongoing storyline win out? It's difficult to say at this point: things are shifting towards establishing The Guide as the series' hapless fool rather than Guillermo. But losing Guillermo would mean losing the heart of the series. We've got one more episode this season, which gives Nandor 24 more minutes, give or take, to finally realize what a — well, what a self-centered prick he's been."

Proma Khosla of IndieWire wrote, "As What We Do in the Shadows has so expertly illustrated, being a vampire isn't just turning into a bat or avoiding the sun or hunting humans and drinking their blood; it's all of that combined, plus a heavy dose of narcissism, some werewolf battles, lots of orgies — and it's the friends you make along the way." Melody McCune of Telltale TV gave the episode a 4 star rating out of 5 and wrote, "'A Weekend at Morrigan Manor' is a darkly delightful, whimsical nod to haunted houses, delivering chills and thrills with the show's trademark wacky energy. Kristen Schaal finally gets her much-needed chance to shine as we learn that The Guide has been playing the crafty long game since the season's beginning."
