= The Return of Jerry =

- What We Do in the Shadows episode
- Episode no.: Season 6 Episode 1
- Directed by: Kyle Newacheck
- Written by: Paul Simms
- Cinematography by: Michael Storey
- Editing by: Liza Cardinale; Matthew Freund; Dane McMaster
- Production code: XWS06001
- Original air date: October 21, 2024
- Running time: 24 minutes

Guest appearance
- Mike O'Brien as Jerry

Episode chronology
← Previous "Exit Interview"	Next → "Headhunting"

"The Return of Jerry" is the first episode of the sixth season of the American mockumentary comedy horror television series What We Do in the Shadows, set in the franchise of the same name. It is the 51st overall episode of the series and was written by executive producer Paul Simms, and directed by executive producer Kyle Newacheck. It was released on FX on October 21, 2024, airing back-to-back with the follow-up episodes "Headhunting" and "Sleep Hypnosis".

The series is set in Staten Island, New York City. Like the 2014 film, the series follows the lives of vampires in the city. These consist of three vampires, Nandor, Laszlo, and Nadja. They live alongside Colin Robinson, an energy vampire; and Guillermo, Nandor's familiar. The series explores the absurdity and misfortunes experienced by the vampires. In the episode, the vampires awaken their fifth vampire roommate, Jerry (Mike O'Brien), who has been sleeping for almost 50 years.

According to Nielsen Media Research, the episode was seen by an estimated 0.170 million household viewers and gained a 0.05 ratings share among adults aged 18–49. The episode received mostly positive reviews from critics, who praised the comedy and O'Brien's guest appearance.

== Plot ==
After the events of the previous season, Guillermo (Harvey Guillén) has moved out of the house. As the vampires debate over the use of Guillermo's old room, they suddenly reminisce over their old vampire roommate, Jerry (Mike O'Brien), who went on a super slumber in 1976. Realizing they forgot to wake him up for New Year's Eve in 1996, they decide to check on him.

They find the coffin in the basement, awakening Jerry. He believes they would finally conquer "the New World", but is annoyed that they barely made any progress and that vampires are still hiding from humans. When Jerry questions the human documentary crew, Nandor (Kayvan Novak) and Nadja (Natasia Demetriou) decide that they must visit Guillermo to ask him. Guillermo is now living in the backyard in Laszlo's garden shed, as he cannot afford a normal apartment. Jerry meets Guillermo, and is taken aback that he is still living at the house. He is specifically disappointed with Nandor, feeling he abandoned his "Relentless" title.

When Jerry states that Nadja and Laszlo (Matt Berry) were on bad terms and did not speak to each other for years, Colin Robinson (Mark Proksch) reveals that it was because Nadja wanted a human job and Laszlo forbade it. Colin Robinson is disappointed that Jerry, whom he considered his best friend, barely acknowledges him and mispronounces his name. Jerry also criticizes Laszlo's lack of progress as a scientist, leading him to give all his tools to Guillermo. When the vampires visit Guillermo to explain their situation, Guillermo states that the problem lies with Jerry, who appears to not fit in the group. He also reluctantly agrees to talk with Jerry to convince him to move out.

As the vampires prefer to kill Jerry, Guillermo consults with the Guide (Kristen Schaal) about Jerry's quest to conquer the New World. Believing him to be the Chosen One, the Guide appoints Jerry as the new leader. The vampires are tasked with coming up with different ways to conquer the New World, although both Laszlo and Nadja choose to focus on their respective life goals.

== Production ==
=== Development ===
In September 2024, FX confirmed that the first episode of the season would be titled "The Return of Jerry", and that it would be written by executive producer Paul Simms, and directed by executive producer Kyle Newacheck. This was Simms' 15th writing credit, and Newacheck's 16th directing credit.

=== Writing ===
Discussing Guillermo's new role, Harvey Guillén said, "Guillermo still holds plenty of compassion for the four vampires, even if his path forward will take him into the unknown, as he takes the many lessons he learned throughout his time as a familiar to give him the strength to take risks. But the thing is that Guillermo is leading with love and empathy, so he could never turn his back on his castmates, or his teammates in the household, because he loves them. Even though they might have cold blood pumping through their hearts, because they're dead and out of this world, they're still his family, and they're his chosen family, and he will protect them at any cost."

== Reception ==
=== Viewers ===
In its original American broadcast, "The Return of Jerry" was seen by an estimated 0.170 million household viewers with a 0.05 in the 18-49 demographics. This means that 0.05 percent of all households with televisions watched the episode. This was a 13% decrease in viewership from the previous episode, which was watched by 0.194 million household viewers with a 0.05 in the 18-49 demographics.

=== Critical reviews ===
"The Return of Jerry" received mostly positive reviews from critics. William Hughes of The A.V. Club gave the 3-episode premiere an "A–" grade and wrote, "it’s not like we haven't had a few laughs along the way, including an all-timer Matt Berry line read when Nadja asks if Laszlo's reanimated interest in reanimating the dead isn't just a bit like Frankenstein. But there are episodes of What We Do In The Shadows that are funny because the people who write, stage, and perform these scripts are just base-level very funny people and episodes that are transcendent because they dial full-bore into the show's absurdist strengths. “The Return Of Jerry” is one of the former."

Alan Sepinwall wrote, "The premiere was probably the weakest of the three, but only because the other two were so great. And it still introduced a promising idea in establishing that there had always been a fifth vampire housemate, Jerry, played by Mike O'Brien, who woke up from a too-long slumber and immediately resumed planning to conquer North America. I imagine we'll be seeing a lot more of Jerry before this is all over." Katie Rife of Vulture gave the 3-episode premiere a 3 star rating out of 5 and wrote, "The first episode of What We Do in the Shadows introduced the relationships between its houseful of vampire roommates by bringing a new character, the fearsome (and weirdly sexy) Baron Afanas, into the fold. The first episode of the show's final season also opens with the reintroduction of a vampiric figure from the gang's past. But by this point, their dynamics are so well established that the addition of another vampire, their power-hungry old roommate Jerry, doesn't change much. It just makes everyone feel weird and bad, and so Jerry has to go."

Proma Khosla of IndieWire wrote, "Guillen gets to tackle Guillermo from an entirely new angle; this is the first What We Do in the Shadows season free of his burning desire to become a vampire, and that fundamental shift in the show's only human is fertile narrative territory. Guillermo's fresh start ripples into new beginnings for all his undead friends, whether it's the debate over who gets his old room or the inability to give him space. It grows clearer that Guillermo was the glue holding this kooky coven together, and they'll need to reassess quite a lot if they want to survive the next few centuries without him." Melody McCune of Telltale TV gave the 3-episode premiere a 4.5 star rating out of 5 and wrote, "It only takes six seasons, but our vamps have recovered their collective motivation and desire to conquer the New World. All it took was incorporating a long-lost fifth roommate into the plot. The writers have opened themselves to the endless storytelling possibilities this universe holds."
