= The Daytona Wind 2 =

- RuPaul's Drag Race episode
- Episode no.: Season 15; Episode 7
- Presented by: RuPaul
- Original air date: February 10, 2023

Guest appearances
- Harvey Guillén (guest judge); Danny Trejo

Episode chronology
← Previous "Old Friends Gold"	Next → "Lip Sync LaLaPaRuza Smackdown"
- RuPaul's Drag Race season 15

"The Daytona Wind 2" is the seventh episode of the fifteenth season of the American television series RuPaul's Drag Race. It originally aired on February 10, 2023. The episode's main challenge tasks the contestants with acting in a sitcom-style reboot of "The Daytona Wind". Harvey Guillén is a guest judge. Danny Trejo is also a special guest.

Mistress Isabelle Brooks wins the main challenge. Aura Mayari is eliminated from the competition after placing in the bottom and losing a lip-sync contest against Jax to "Sweetest Pie" by Megan Thee Stallion and Dua Lipa. The corresponding episode of RuPaul's Drag Race: Untucked earned a nomination in the Outstanding Picture Editing for an Unstructured Reality Program category at the 75th Primetime Emmy Awards.

== Episode ==
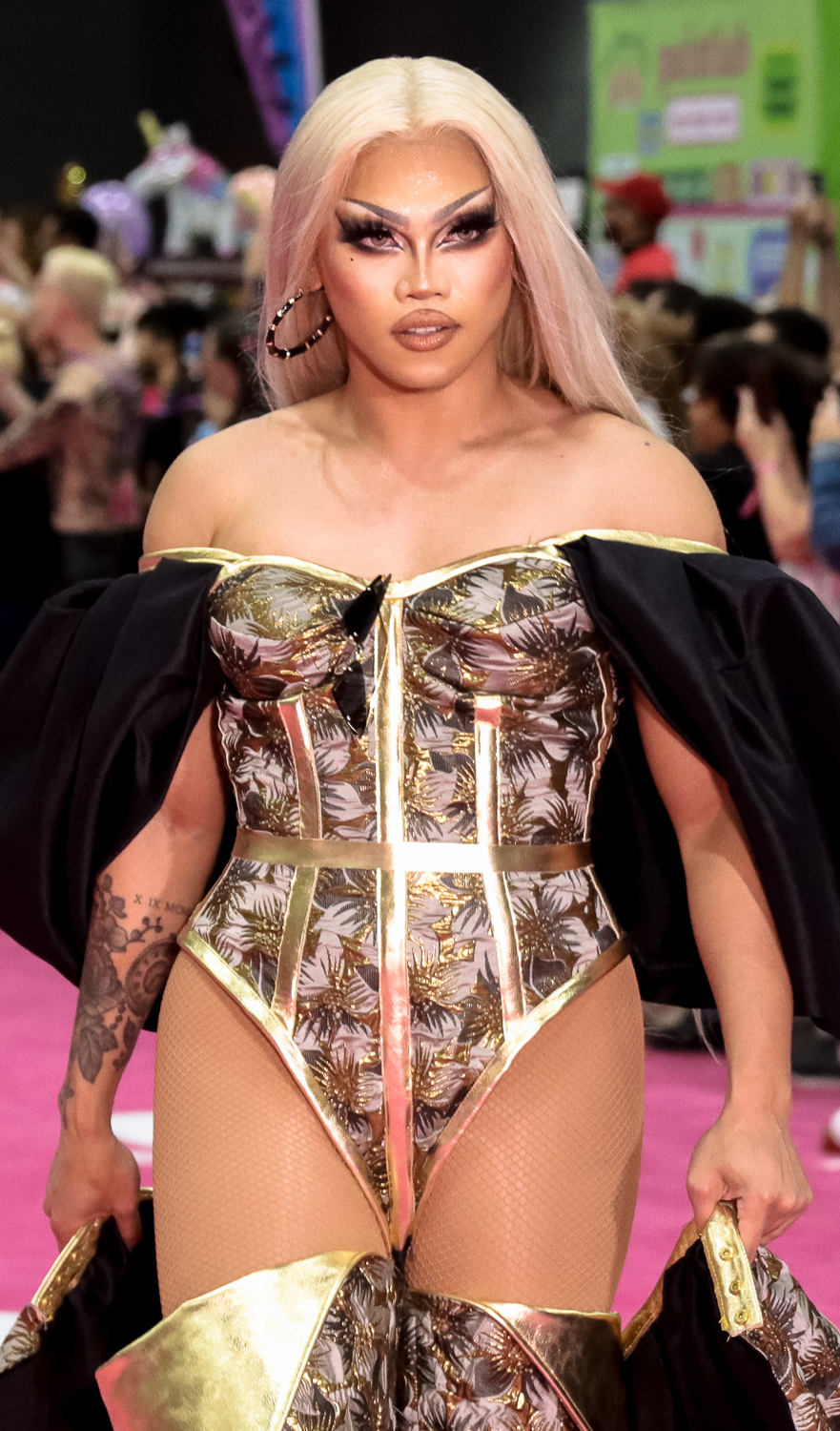
Aura Mayari (pictured at RuPaul's DragCon LA in 2023) is eliminated from the competition.

For the episode's main challenge, the contestant act in a sitcom-style reboot of "The Daytona Wind" (with editing referencing Tim and Eric Awesome Show, Great Job!). Aura Mayari, as the winner of the previous challenge, assigns the roles:

- Anetra as Cousin Georgie
- Aura Mayari as Widow Davenport
- Jax as Jackson
- Loosey LaDuca as Lizzadene
- Luxx Noir London as Leo
- Malaysia Babydoll Foxx as The Reverend
- Marcia Marcia Marcia as Cousin Dodie
- Mistress Isabelle Brooks as Fancy
- Salina EsTitties as "Aint" Haddie Ruth
- Sasha Colby as Maxie
- Spice as Diandra

On the runway, the category is "Puffa Please". In addition to RuPaul and Michelle Visage, Carson Kressley is a judge and Harvey Guillén is a guest judge. Anetra, Malaysia Babydoll Foxx, Marcia Marcia Marcia, and Mistress Isabelle Brooks receive positive critiques, with Mistress Isabelle Brooks winning the challenge. Aura Mayari, Jax and Spice receive negative critiques, with Spice being declared safe. Aura Mayari and Jax face off in a lip-sync contest to "Sweetest Pie" (2022) by Megan Thee Stallion and Dua Lipa. Aura Mayari is eliminated from the competition.

== Production and broadcast ==
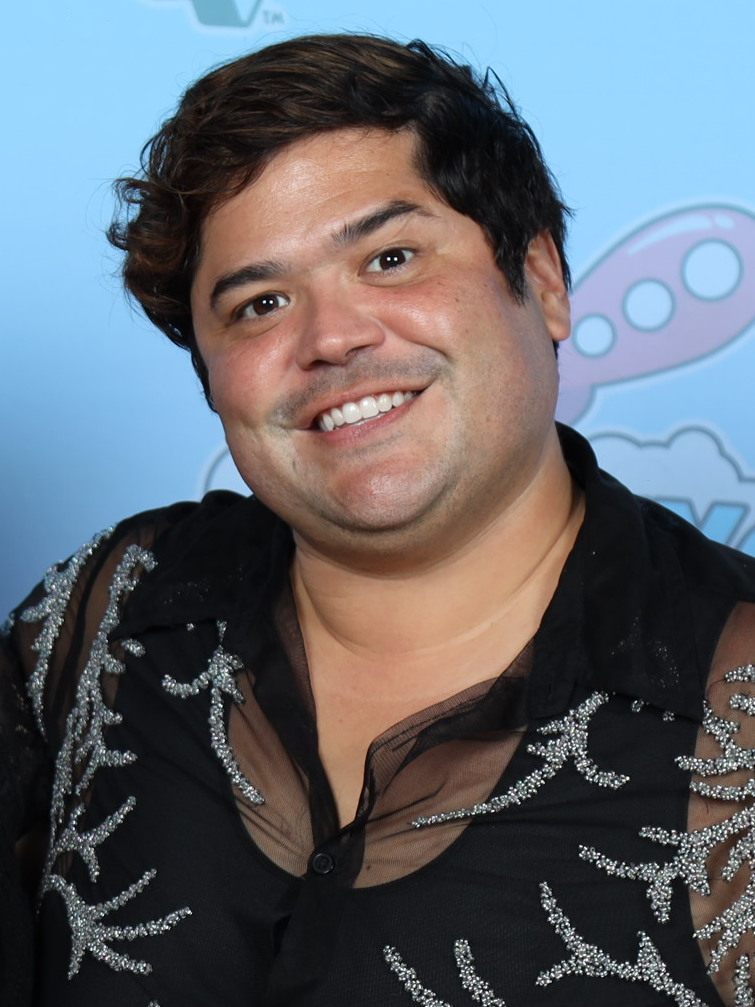
Harvey Guillén (pictured in 2023) is a guest judge.

The episode originally aired on February 10, 2023.

The main challenge includes a 1980s sitcom-inspired laugh track.

Jordan Robledo of Gay Times said the contestants "delivered twists, turns and flips galore" during the lip-sync contest. Aura Mayari did not know the lyrics to "Sweetest Pie". She has said her performance was limited because of the runway layout and lack of sleep.

=== Fashion ===
Aura Mayari wore a kimono-style outfit and heart-shaped pasties.

== Reception ==
Trae DeLellis of The A.V. Club gave the episode a rating of 'C'. Stephen Daw of Billboard said Jax "basically broke Drag Race Twitter" with her lip-sync performance. Daw also ranked the contest fourth in the magazine's list of the season's lip-syncs, writing: "There was no 'Pie' leftover after this lip sync ended, because Jax ate and left no crumbs. While Aura struggled to remember all the words to Megan Thee Stallion's rapid-fire rap, Jax remained cool, calm and collected while hitting every word and every movement of this song with perfect precision. Every flip and roll she did throughout the number landed with grace, fluidly transitioning each time into her next 'oh my god how did she do that' trick. We'd say that Aura did a good job, too, but if we're being honest, we kind of forgot that she was there about halfway through this incredible routine." Kevin O'Keeffe of Xtra Magazine said Jax moved "with such ferocity and dexterity that it was impossible to keep your eyes off her (no matter how much Aura tried to block her)". Coleman Spilde of The Daily Beast called the lip-sync one of the show's best.

The corresponding episode of RuPaul's Drag Race: Untucked earned lead editor Matthew D. Miller and editor Kellen Cruden a nomination in the Outstanding Picture Editing for an Unstructured Reality Program category at the 75th Primetime Emmy Awards.
