= Shelved =

2023 Canadian workplace comedy television series

- Genre: Sitcom
- Created by: Anthony Q. Farrell
- Starring: Lyndie Greenwood; Chris Sandiford; Dakota Ray Hebert; Paul Braunstein
- Country of origin: Canada
- Original language: English
- No. of seasons: 1
- No. of episodes: 8

Production
- Production company: Counterfeit Pictures

Original release
- Network: CTV
- Release: March 6 – April 24, 2023

Shelved is a Canadian television sitcom that premiered on March 6, 2023 on CTV. It was shelved after one season.

== Premise ==
Shelved is a workplace comedy that follows the employees and patrons of the fictional Metropolitan Public Library's Jameson Branch, in the working-class neighbourhood Parkdale, Toronto, Ontario. The show has been likened to a number of popular series, like Parks and Recreation, Superstore, and The Office.

== Cast and characters ==
=== Main ===
- Lyndie Greenwood as branch head Wendy Yarmouth
- Paul Braunstein as assistant branch head Bryce de Laurel
- Dakota Ray Hebert as junior librarian Jacqueline "Jaq" Bedard
- Chris Sandiford as senior librarian Howard Tutt

=== Recurring ===
- Robin Duke as Wendy "Unhoused Wendy" Brown, a regular library patron and self-described "wackadoo"
- Taylor Love as Sheila Boyd, a caring community leader and law student working part time at the Settlement Desk
- Varun Saranga as Alvin Canada, an entrepreneur and freelance business consultant

== Episodes ==
No.	Title	Directed by	Written by	Original release date
1	"Jane Eyre FICTION BRO"	Aleysa Young	Anthony Q. Farrell	March 6, 2023
2	"Things Fall Apart FICTION ACH"	Aleysa Young	Brandon Hackett	March 13, 2023
3	"Drag: The Complete Story NONFIC DOO"	Cazhhmere Downey	Sadiya Durrani	March 20, 2023
4	"And Still I Rise FICTION ANG"	Aleysa Young	Jay Vaidya	March 27, 2023
5	"The Hunger Games FICTION COL"	Cory Bowles	Anthony Q. Farrell	April 3, 2023
6	"Moby Dick FICTION MEL"	Joyce Wong	Sadiya Durrani	April 10, 2023
7	"Wall and Piece NONFIC BAN"	Samantha MacAdam	Eva Thomas	April 17, 2023
8	"Brave New World SF HUX"	Joyce Wong	Jay Vaidya	April 24, 2023
