= The Daytona Wind =

- RuPaul's Drag Race episode
- Episode no.: Season 14; Episode 7
- Original air date: February 18, 2022

Guest appearance
- Ts Madison

Episode chronology
← Previous "Glamazon Prime"	Next → "60s Girl Groups"

"The Daytona Wind" is the seventh episode of the fourteenth season of the American television series RuPaul's Drag Race. It originally aired on February 18, 2022. The episode's main challenge tasks contestants with acting in a 1980-inspired parody of a soap opera called The Daytona Wind. Ts Madison is a guest judge. Lady Camden wins the episode's main challenge and no contestants are eliminated from the competition. The parody is revisited in the season 15 (2023) episode "The Daytona Wind 2".

== Episode ==
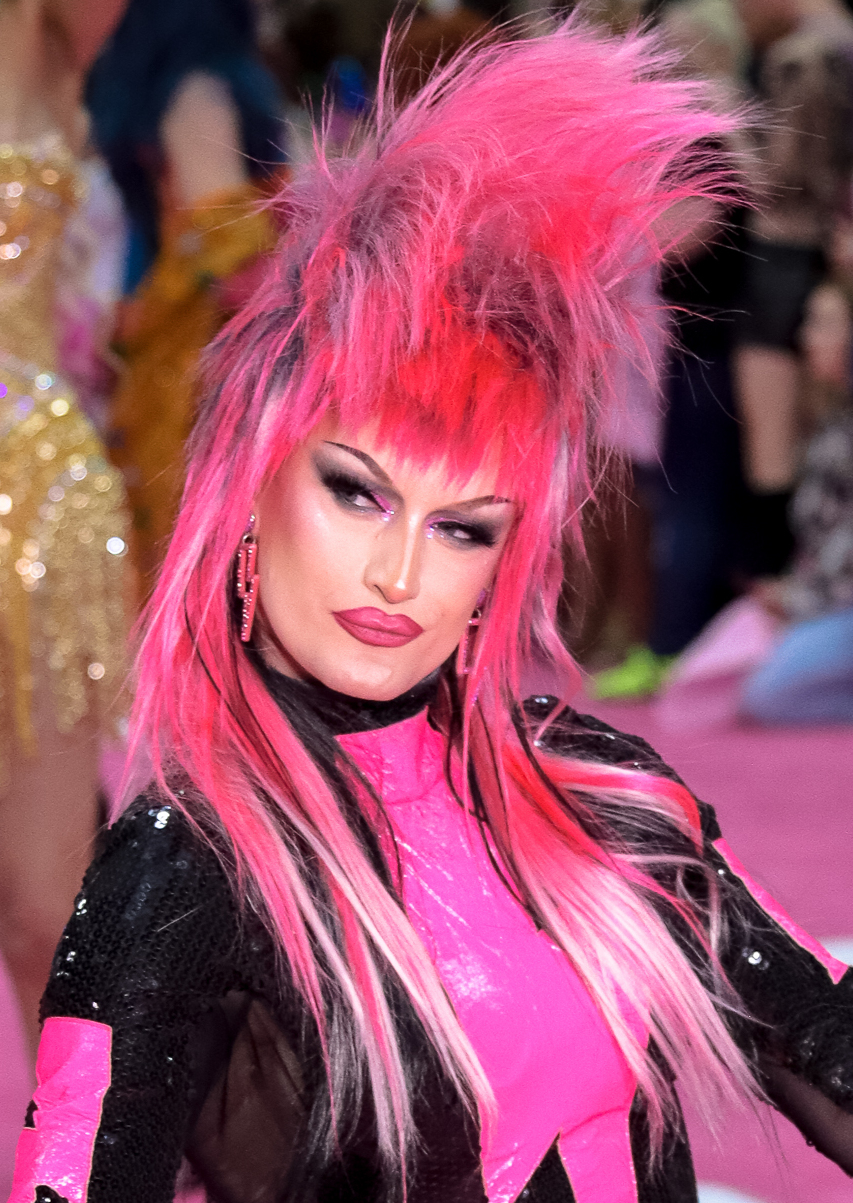
Lady Camden (pictured at RuPaul's DragCon LA in 2023) wins the episode's main challenge.

The contestants return to the Werk Room after Maddy Morphosis's elimination on the previous episode. Daya Betty complains about her placement on the last main challenge, overshadowing Jorgeous's win. On a new day, Daya Betty apologizes to Jorgeous. RuPaul greets the group and reveals the main challenge, which tasks the contestants with acting in a 1980s-inspired parody of a soap opera called The Daytona Wind. RuPaul reveals that he will be directing the soap opera. As the winner of the last main challenge, Jorgeous is tasked with assigning the roles to the contestants. The group read the script and share which roles are of interest. Jorgeous decides on the following cast:

- Angeria Paris VanMicheals plays Maxine O'Hara
- Bosco plays Fancy Micheals
- Daya Betty plays Micheals Sister #1
- DeJa Skye plays Maggie O'Hara
- Jasmine Kennedie plays Hattie Ruth
- Jorgeous plays Sierra Micheals
- Kerri Colby plays Deandra Davenport
- Lady Camden plays Leona Micheals
- Willow Pill plays Micheals Sister #2

The contestants start to rehearse in the Werk Room, then film with RuPaul. On elimination day, the contestants make final preparations in the Werk Room for the fashion show. The group discuss the leather subculture and San Francisco's Folsom Street Fair. Jasmine Kennedie reads to the group a note left for her by Maddy Morphosis.

On the main stage, RuPaul welcomes fellow judge Michelle Visage and Ross Mathews, as well as guest judge Ts Madison. RuPaul shares the runway category ("Chaps on the Runway"), then the fashion show commences. The contestants and judges watch The Daytona Wind, which has been edited to include sound effects of flatulence as well as narration by Visage. The judges deliver their critiques, deliberate, then share the results with the group. Bosco, Daya Betty, Jasmine Kennedie, Jorgeous, Lady Camden, and Willow Pill receive positive critiques. Daya Betty and Lady Camden are declared the top two contestants of the week and face off in a lip-sync contest to "One Way or Another" (1979) by Blondie for the win. After the lip-sync, Lady Camden is announced as the winner of the challenge. RuPaul then announces that no one is being eliminated from the competition this time.

== Production ==
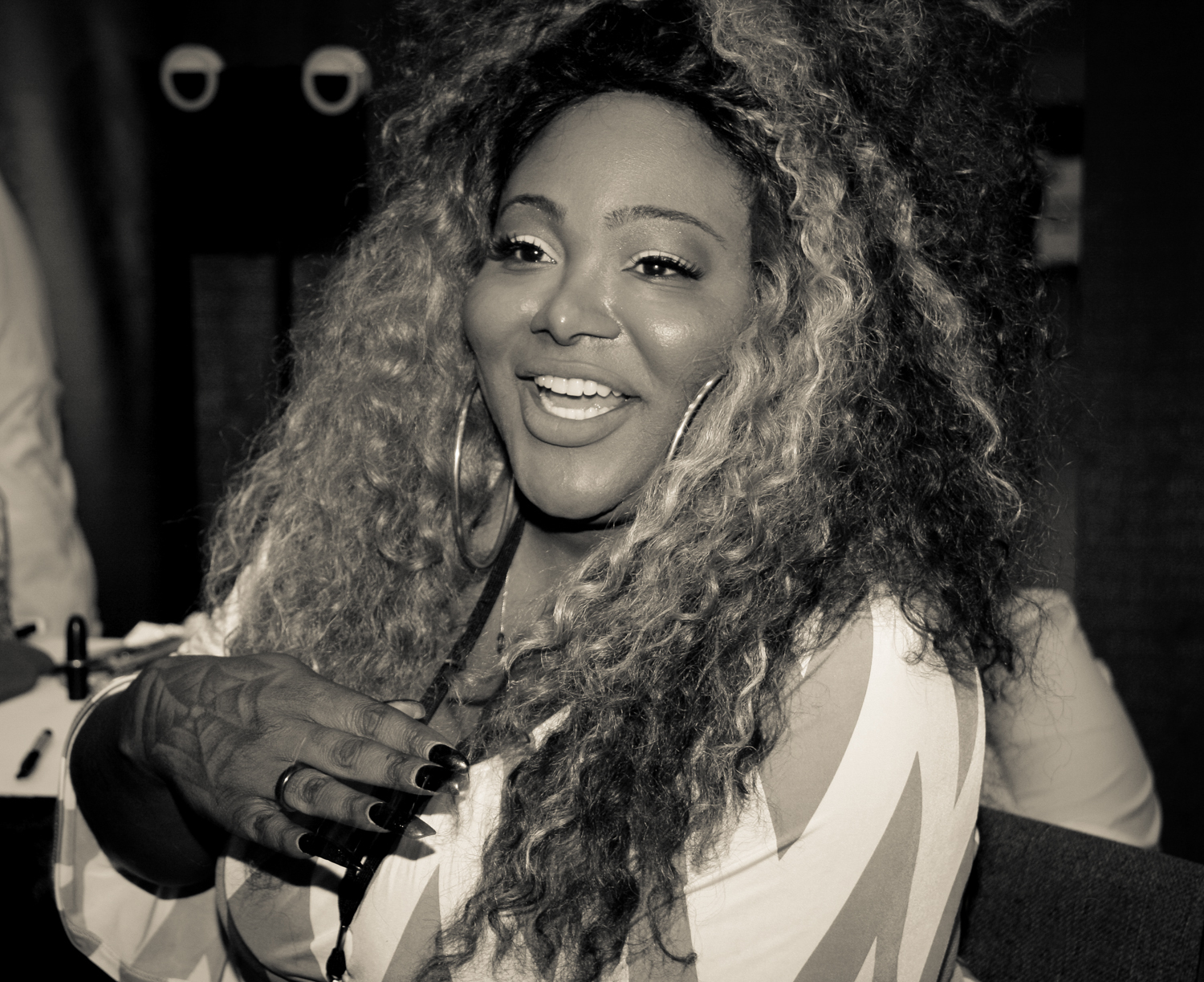
Ts Madison (pictured in 2017) is a guest judge.

The episode originally aired on February 18, 2022.

Bosco's character Fancy Michaels is inspired by Reba McEntire and the song "Fancy". Bosco wore McEntire-inspired hair and makeup for the sketch.

Multiple contestants discuss being transgender on Untucked. Inspired by Kerri Colby, Jasmine Kennedie comes out as a trans woman. While holding Kerri Colby's hand, Jasmine Kennedie said, "It just further affirmed what I've been feeling my whole life. I definitely do feel like I'm trans, and I've been so scared to say it. I have held back from it for so long because I didn't want to hurt my dad. But, I can't lie about it anymore. I am trans."

Jasmine Kennedie has said the episode was her highlight of the season. She told Gay Times, "That whole episode, including the Untucked, had so many amazing things happening for me. From my acting to my runway, I felt very confident in what I presented that day. So many one-liners came out of that day from the whole cast too!."

=== Fashion ===
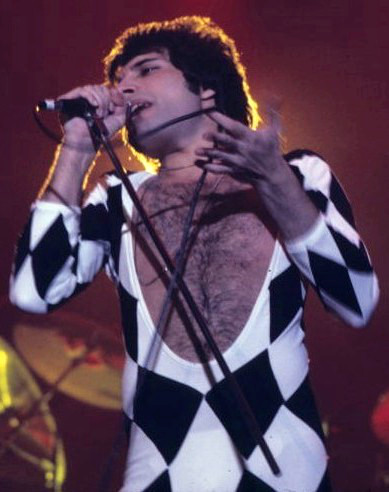
For the fashion show, Lady Camden presents a look inspired by British rock musician Freddie Mercury (pictured in 1977).

For the main stage, RuPaul wears an orange dress and a blonde wig.

For the fashion show, the contestants present looks with chaps. Willow Pill has a black outfit that gives the illusion of two additional arms holding her two blonde pigtails. Bosco wears a pink leather outfit with fringe and a 40-inch long blonde wig made from human hair. DeJa Skye has a blue outfit and an orange wig. Kerri Colby has a 90-inch long wig also made from human hair. Jorgeous has an outfit with lace. Angeria Paris VanMichaels had a gold disco-inspired outfit. She has overized shoulders and long hair. Jasmine Kennedie has a blue-and-green graduation-inspired look. Lady Camden comes out in a white outfit, then appears to fall, revealing into a Freddie Mercury-inspired look. She wears a mustache and a black-and-white outfit with lightning strikes. Daya Betty's outfit is black and blue. She wears a large black hat.

== Reception ==
Trae DeLellis of The A.V. Club gave the episode a rating a 'A'. Marcus Wratten of PinkNews said the episode had one of the "stand out" challenges of the season. Patrick Ryan of USA Today called Lady Camden's screaming of "Maxine" in the sketch an "iconic one-liner".

== See also ==
- Reba McEntire as a gay icon
