= Chris Sandiford =

Canadian actor (born 1987)

- Born: August 5, 1987 (age 39); Kingston, Ontario, Canada
- Education: Concordia University
- Occupations: Actor; comedian
- Website: www.chrissandiford.com

Chris Sandiford (born August 5, 1987) is a Canadian actor and comedian. He is most noted for his leading role as Howard in the comedy series Shelved, for which he was a Canadian Screen Award nominee in 2024.

== Early life ==
Originally from Kingston, Ontario, he attended the Mel Hoppenheim School of Cinema at Concordia University.

== Career ==
Besides his leading role as Howard in the television comedy series Shelved, He has also had recurring roles as Derek in What We Do in the Shadows and Tom in God's Favorite Idiot, and has had supporting roles in film and television.

He has also performed comedy, both as a solo stand-up comedian and with Daniel Carin in the sketch comedy duo Ladies & Gentlemen.

== Awards ==
- 12th Canadian Screen Awards - Nominee for Best Leading Performance in a Comedy Series (2024)
