= Harvey Guillén =

American actor

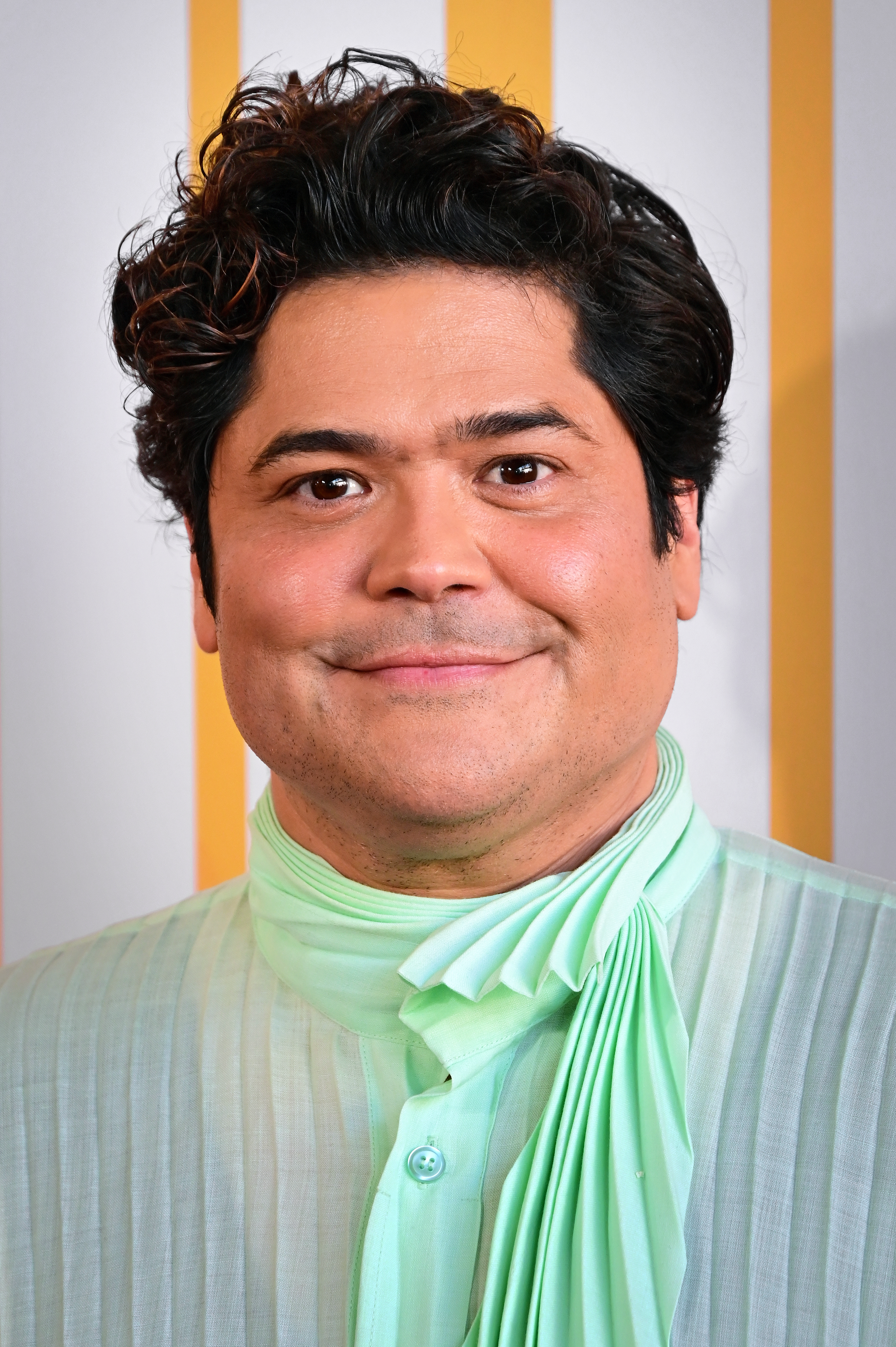
- Guillén in 2026
- Born: Javier Guillén; Orange County, California, U.S.
- Occupation: Actor
- Years active: 2008–present
- Known for: What We Do in the Shadows

Javier "Harvey" Guillén (Latin American Spanish: [xaˈβjeɾ ˈxaɾβi ɣiˈʝen]) is an American actor. He is best known for his role as the human familiar Guillermo de la Cruz in the television series What We Do in the Shadows. He is also known for his voice work.

== Early life ==
Harvey Guillén is the son of Mexican immigrants. He adopted the name Harvey when school teachers could not pronounce his first name. Guillén attended Citrus College, completing the three-year Citrus Singers program in 2005. He used to recycle trash to pay for improv classes. His father, who was the first person who encouraged him to pursue acting, died of lung cancer in 2017.

== Career ==
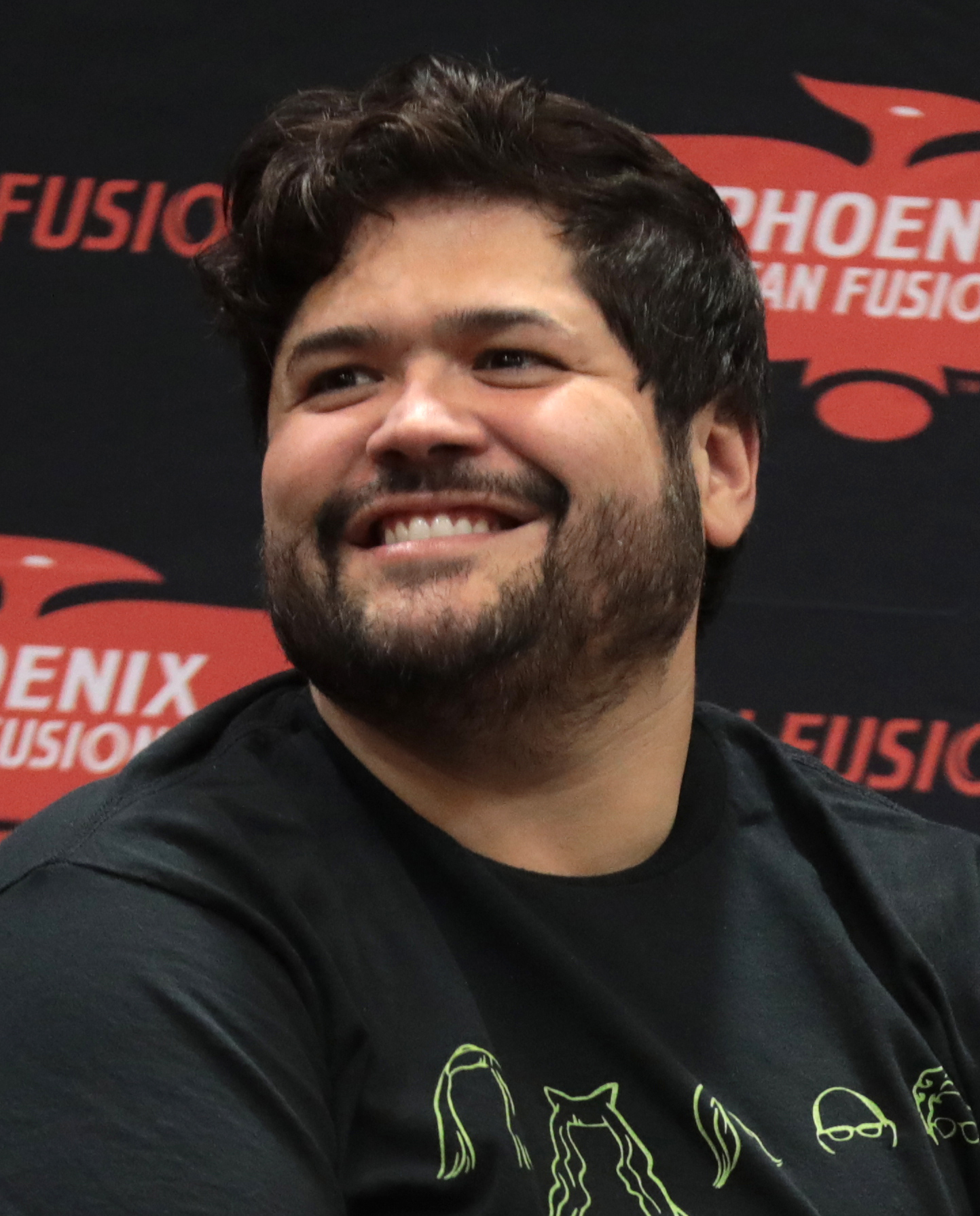
Guillén at the 2022 Phoenix Fan Fusion

Guillén has appeared in recurring roles on television series such as Alistair Delgado on Huge (2010), Cousin Blobbin on The Thundermans (2013–2018), George Reyes in Eye Candy (2015), and Benedict Fenwick on The Magicians (2017–2018). He also appeared in the 2013 film The Internship.

Beginning in 2019, Guillén played the role of Guillermo de la Cruz, the vampires' human familiar, in the FX television series What We Do in the Shadows. He also appeared in Quibi's science fiction drama series Don't Look Deeper, before the platform shut down in December 2020.

Guillén has received considerable acclaim for his role as Guillermo. TheWrap included Guillén in a list of "2019 Emmy Contenders". Hank Steuver, in his review of What We Do in the Shadows in The Chicago Tribune, stated that Guillén "provides at least half the big laughs" in the show.

Guillén provided the voice of Funny the Magic House in Mickey Mouse Funhouse. He played Nightwing starting in season 3 of Harley Quinn.

In 2022, Guillén provided the voice for the comedic sidekick character Perrito in Puss in Boots: The Last Wish.

In 2023, Guillén appeared on The Late Show with Stephen Colbert in a skit as Representative George Santos.

In 2024, Guillén reprised his role as Cousin Blobbin from The Thundermans in The Thundermans Return. He also provided the voice of Odie in The Garfield Movie and Vassago in Helluva Boss.

In 2026, Guillén again appeared on The Late Show with Stephen Colbert to promote the Broadway play he would be appearing in, The Rocky Horror Show.

He's presently the host of the Spotify Podcast "Killer Stories".

== Personal life ==
Guillén speaks Spanish, English, and Japanese—the last acquired during a 13-month visit to Japan. He identifies as queer. In 2023, he was in a relationship with Kevin Braun. The couple later separated.

In January 2025 his house in Altadena was damaged by the Eaton Fire.

== Filmography ==
=== Film ===
Year	Title	Role	Notes
2012	General Education	Andy	
2013	The Internship	Zach	
2017	8 Bodies	Garry	Short film
2017	Truth or Dare	Holt Thorne	
2018	Status Update	Lonnie Gregory	
2018	F.R.E.D.I.	Lopez	
2021	Werewolves Within	Joaquim Wolfson	
2022	Cursed Friends	Andy Leonard	
2022	I'm Totally Fine	DJ Twisted Bristle	
2022	Puss in Boots: The Last Wish	Perrito (voice)	
2023	Blue Beetle	Dr. Jose Francisco Morales Rivera de la Cruz / "Sanchez"	
2023	Strays	Shitstain (voice)	
2023	Wish	Gabo (voice)	
2024	The Thundermans Return	Cousin Blobbin	
2024	The Garfield Movie	Odie (voice)	
2024	The Life of Chuck	Hector	
2025	Companion	Eli	
2025	Alexander and the Terrible, Horrible, No Good, Very Bad Road Trip	Claudio	
2025	A Loud House Christmas Movie: Naughty or Nice	Duncan (voice)	
2026	That Friend	Paul	
2026	Street Smart	Danny G	
2026	Forgotten Island	Market Stall Vendor (voice)	
TBA	(Saint) Peter	Daymon Grundy	Post-production

=== Television ===
Year	Title	Role	Episode(s)
2006	The Suite Life of Zack & Cody	Extra	Episode: "What the Hey?"
2008	Miss Guided	Lopez	Episode: "The List"
2010	Huge	Alistair Delgado	Main cast (10 episodes)
2010	Most Likely to Succeed	Chuck	Unaired pilot
2012	Dog with a Blog	Glenn	Episode: "Stan of the House"
2012	Raising Hope	Elijah	Episode: "Don't Ask, Don't Tell Me What to Do"
2013–2018	The Thundermans	Cousin Blobbin	8 episodes
2015	Eye Candy	George Reyes	Main cast (10 episodes)
2016	Crazy Ex-Girlfriend	Beans	Episode: "Josh & I Work on a Case!"
2016	Young & Hungry	Zander	Episode: "Young & Sofia"
2016	Haters Back Off	Harvey	2 episodes
2016	Documentary Now!	Manuel	Episode: "Juan Likes Rice & Chicken"
2017	The Real O'Neals	August	Episode: "The Real Heartbreak"
2017	iZombie	Diego	Episode: "20-Sided, Die"
2017–2020	The Magicians	Benedict Pickwick	8 episodes
2018	The Good Place	Steve	Episode: "Everything Is Bonzer!"
2018	Into the Dark	Nick	Episode: "The Body"
2019–2024	What We Do in the Shadows	Guillermo de la Cruz	Main cast (61 episodes)
2020	Little America	Victor	Episode: "The Rock"
2020	Don't Look Deeper	Renato	4 episodes
2020	Room 104	Luke	Episode: "Foam Party"
2021	Zoey's Extraordinary Playlist	George	4 episodes
2021	The Owl House	Angmar (voice)	Episode: "Through the Looking Glass Ruins"
2021	The Boulet Brothers' Dragula	Guest Judge	Episode: "Killer Clowns"
2021	Archer	Alton (voice)	3 episodes
2021	Teenage Euthanasia	Kenton Burpy (voice)	Episode: "First Date with the Second Coming"
2021–2025	Mickey Mouse Funhouse	Funny the Funhouse (voice)	Main cast (86 episodes)
2022	The Casagrandes	Henrique (voice)	Episode: "The Bros in the Band"
2022	Reacher	Jasper	5 episodes
2022–present	Big City Greens	Hector (voice)	3 episodes
2022–2023	Human Resources	José/Brett (voice)	4 episodes
2022–present	Harley Quinn	Dick Grayson/Nightwing/Red X (voice)	11 episodes
2023	The Late Show with Stephen Colbert	George Santos	2 episodes
2023	Shape Island	Square (voice)	Main role (10 episodes)
2023	RuPaul's Drag Race	Guest Judge	Episode: "The Daytona Wind 2"
2023	RuPaul's Drag Race: Untucked	Self	Episode: "Untucked – The Daytona Winds 2"
2023	Lopez vs Lopez	Miguel	Episode: "Lopez vs. Primos"
2023	Digman!	High Score (voice)	Episode: "The Arky Gala"
2023	We Baby Bears	Genie/Wishbone Salesman (voice)	Episode: "The Big Wish"
2023	Kung Fu Panda: The Dragon Knight	Pelpel (voice)	6 episodes
2023–2024	Firebuds	Uncle Tad (voice)	2 episodes
2024	Impractical Jokers	Self	Episode: "Harvey Guillen"
2024	Angry Birds Mystery Island	Buddy (voice)	Main role (24 episodes)
2024	Class Acts	Therapist from Hell	Episode: "The Ending Could Ruin Everything"
2024–present	Helluva Boss	Vassago (voice)	3 episodes
2025	Wizards Beyond Waverly Place	Gossip Stone	Episode: "The Wizard at the End of the World: Part Two"
2025	Adventure Time: Fionna and Cake	Gary Prince (voice)	Main cast (Season 2)
2025	Star Wars: Visions	BILY, Darth Bear (voice)	Episode: "Yuko's Treasure"
2025	Krapopolis	Zenobius (voice)	Episode: "The Anniversary Present"

=== Theatre ===
Year	Title	Role	Venue	Ref.
2023	Spamalot	Patsy	Washington D.C., Kennedy Center	
2026	The Rocky Horror Show	Eddie/Dr. Scott	Broadway, Studio 54	

== Awards and nominations ==
Year	Award	Category	Nominated work	Result	Ref.
2021	Critics' Choice Television Awards	Best Supporting Actor in a Comedy Series	What We Do in the Shadows	Nominated	
2022	Critics' Choice Television Awards	Best Supporting Actor in a Comedy Series	What We Do in the Shadows	Nominated	
2022	Saturn Awards	Best Supporting Actor in a Network or Cable Television Series	What We Do in the Shadows	Nominated	
2024	Critics' Choice Television Awards	Best Supporting Actor in a Comedy Series	What We Do in the Shadows	Nominated	
2026	Imagen Awards	Best Voice-Over Actor	Shape Island	Nominated	
