= Mass media in Binghamton, New York =

There are a number of notable sources of mass media in Binghamton, New York, United States. Located near the border with Pennsylvania, Binghamton media act as a source of information and entertainment for a large region, extending well beyond the metropolitan area. Most local television and radio stations broadcast from Ingraham Hill, which is located in the town of Binghamton, just south of the city.

== Television stations ==
According to the Nielsen Company, Binghamton is the 159th largest TV market in the United States.

| Callsign | Channel | Affiliation | Subchannels | | Owner |
| Callsign | Channel | Affiliation | Channel | Programming | Owner |
|---|---|---|---|---|---|
| WBNG | 12 | CBS | 12.2; 12.3 | The CW (formerly cable-only "WBXI"); MeTV | Gray Media |
| WBGH-CD | 20 | NBC | 20.3 | ABC (WIVT HD simulcast) | Nexstar Media Group |
| WIVT | 34 | ABC | 34.2; 34.3; 34.4 | NBC (WBGH-CD HD simulcast); Laff; Escape | Nexstar Media Group |
| WICZ | 40 | Fox | 40.2; 40.3 | MNTV (WBPN-LP simulcast); Ion Television | Deltavision Media |
| WSKG | 46 | PBS | 42.2; 42.3; 42.4 | PBS Kids; Create; World | WSKG Public Telecommunications Council |

There are also two local cable stations in Binghamton, both carried by Charter Communications (doing business as Charter Spectrum). Spectrum News Central New York broadcasts 24-hour local cable news programming, and Spectrum Sports provides regional sports programming. Both channels originate from Syracuse, but maintain distinct feeds for the Binghamton market. Binghamton falls under the regional broadcasting market of the YES Network, MSG, and SportsNet New York.

== Radio stations ==
As of 2021, Nielsen ranks Binghamton as the United States' 194th largest radio market.

=== FM ===
FM stations with transmitters located within 30 miles (48 km) of Binghamton (excluding translators that simulcast other FM stations within the radius):

| Callsign | Frequency (MHz) | Branding/Affiliation | Format | Owner | Power (Watts) | City of license |
|---|---|---|---|---|---|---|
| WCII | 88.5 | Family Life Network | Christian | Family Life Ministries | 17,000 | Spencer |
| WSKG | 89.3 | NPR | Public radio (classical/news) | WSKG Public Telecommunications Council | 11,500 | Binghamton |
| WIFF | 90.1 | CSN International | Christian | Calvary Chapel of Twin Falls | 100 | Windsor |
| WHRW | 90.5 | Binghamton University | Free format | Binghamton University | 1,450 | Binghamton |
| WSQX | 91.5 | NPR | Public radio (jazz/news) | WSKG Public Telecommunications Council | 3,500 | Binghamton |
| WKGB | 92.5 | 92.5 KGB | Mainstream rock | iHeartMedia | 1,450 | Conklin |
| W225BC | 92.9 | Z93 | Rock | Fitzgerald and Hawras, Partnership | 175 | Endicott |
| WJOB | 93.3 | | Urban contemporary | Broome County Urban League | 1,900 | Susquehanna, PA |
| WCEB | 94.7 | Family Life Network | Christian | Family Life Ministries | 770 | Deposit |
| WPEL | 96.5 | | Christian | Montrose Broadcasting Corporation | 57,000 | Montrose, PA |
| W245BV | 96.9 | US 96.9; AP Radio; Westwood One; Premiere Radio Networks | Classic Country simulcast of WINR | iHeartMedia | 65 | Endwell |
| WHWK | 98.1 | 98.1 The Hawk | Country | Townsquare Media | 6,700 | Binghamton |
| WAAL | 99.1 | 99.1 The Whale; New York Giants Radio Network | Classic rock | Townsquare Media | 8,700 | Binghamton |
| WVIP | 100.5 | 100.5 The Drive | Alternative rock Adult album alternative | Equinox Broadcasting | 1,600 | Susquehanna, PA |
| WLTB | 101.7 | Magic 101.7 | Adult Rock | GM Broadcasting | 6,000 | Johnson City |
| WLTB HD2 | 102.5 | 102.5 The Vault | Classic Hits | GM Broadcasting | 261 | Johnson City |
| WMXW | 103.3 | Mix 103; Westwood One | Adult contemporary | iHeartMedia | 520 | Vestal |
| WWYL | 104.1 | Kiss 104.1 | Top 40/CHR | Townsquare Media | 930 | Chenango Bridge |
| WBNW | 105.7 | Now 105.7 | Top 40/CHR | iHeartMedia | 35,000 | Endicott |
| WCDW | 106.7 | Cool 106.7 | Oldies | Equinox Broadcasting | 1,200 | Port Dickinson |
| W296BS | 107.1 | Sunny 107.1 | Soft AC | Equinox Broadcasting | 250 | Johnson City |
| WBBI | 107.5 | New Country B107.5 | Country | iHeartMedia | 2,200 | Binghamton |
| W300BV | 107.9 | News Radio 1330 WEBO; CBS Radio Network; Motor Racing Network; Performance Racing Network | Full service (AC/news) simulcast of WEBO | Radigan Broadcasting Group | 250 | Owego |
| WXL38 | 162.475 | NOAA Weather Radio All Hazards | Weather radio | National Weather Service | 1,000 | Binghamton |

=== AM ===
AM stations with transmitters located within 30 miles (48 km) of Binghamton:

| Callsign | Frequency (kHz) | Branding/Affiliation | Format | Owner | Daytime Power (W) | Nighttime Power (W) | City of license |
|---|---|---|---|---|---|---|---|
| WINR | 680 | US 96.9; AP Radio; Westwood One; Premiere Radio Networks | Classic Country | iHeartMedia | 5,000 | 500 | Endwell |
| WPEL | 800 | | Christian | Montrose Broadcasting Corporation | 1,000 | 135 | Montrose, PA |
| WNBF | 1290 | News Radio 1290 | News; Talk | Townsquare Media | 9,300 | 5,000 | Binghamton |
| WEBO | 1330 | News Radio 1330 WEBO; CBS Radio Network; Motor Racing Network; Performance Racing Network | Full service (AC/news) | Radigan Broadcasting Group | 5,000 | 36 | Owego |
| WENE | 1430 | 1430 The Team; Dial Global; Fox Sports Radio; Premiere Radio Networks | Sports | iHeartMedia | 5,000 | 5,000 | Endicott |

== Print ==
Currently, Binghamton is home to a single regional daily newspaper, the Press & Sun-Bulletin. There are, however, a number of community newspapers produced regionally.

=== Commercial ===
- Greater Binghamton Business Journal (weekly)
- Press & Sun-Bulletin (daily)
- Southern Tier Business News (monthly)

=== Non-commercial ===
- The Bridge (Independent Media Center affiliate, online)
- Binghamton Review (Binghamton University student newspaper, biweekly)
- Pipe Dream (Binghamton University student newspaper, twice weekly)
- Triple Cities Carousel (arts news, monthly)
- What's Goin' On Binghamton (arts, entertainment, weekly, online)

== Binghamton in audiovisual media ==
=== Media recorded in Binghamton ===
- Liebestraum (1991): motion picture was filmed in many locations in and around Binghamton, in particular utilizing the Perry Block, a building with a cast-iron facade
- My Kid Could Paint That (2007): documentary about child artist Marla Olmstead and her Binghamton studio
- The Rewrite (2014): primarily set in Binghamton and at Binghamton University, with several scenes filmed on location
- The music video for Taylor Swift's "Back to December" was filmed in Binghamton.
- A large portion of the international web series Pioneer One was filmed in Binghamton.

=== Other media with references to Binghamton ===
- The Twilight Zone: several episodes refer to or take inspiration from Binghamton, due to the city being series creator Rod Serling's hometown
  - "Walking Distance" (1959): based on Recreation Park and its Recreation Park Carousel, both of which are near Serling's childhood home
  - "Mirror Image" (1960): Paul Grinstead is from Binghamton
- Night Gallery: Rod Serling's home address was used in the episode "They're Tearing Down Tim Riley's Bar" (1971)
- "Ragged Old Flag" (1974): the song was written by Johnny Cash when he was walking around Binghamton before a concert The song references a flag in the courthouse square, which was likely inspired by the Broome County Courthouse square.
- Slap Shot (1977): the fictional Broome County Blades are from Binghamton, and the pregame fight is based on a real story that took place on January 16, 1975, in Binghamton, when the Syracuse Blazers and Broome Dusters had a 30-minute pregame brawl
- Death Wish 3 (1985): Paul Kersey's girlfriend's sister is from Binghamton.
- Rounders (1998): a poker game in the movie is set in Binghamton
- Mystery Alaska (1999): at the end of the movie, a character says, "I'm not going to the New York Rangers right away. They're sending me to Binghamton, which is like the AHL."
- The Sopranos: in season six, Christopher Moltisanti's mistress is from Binghamton.
- The X-Files
  - "Colony" (1995): Mulder and Scully briefly track a killer through Binghamton, stopping at the fictional Globe and Mail local newspaper office
  - "4-D" (2001): Monica Reyes' new Georgetown apartment address of 67 Bennett Avenue was actually Rod Serling's home address in Binghamton
- 7th Heaven: Binghamton is mentioned by the Reverend when a visitor comes to town. He says "Binghamton... my Binghamton?"
- The King of Queens: in the episode "Tube Stakes", Carrie asks Arthur if he remembers a college guy she used to date when she was 16 and Arthur responds, "Oh, yes. Russell from SUNY Binghamton." Victor Williams, who plays Deacon on the show, graduated from Binghamton University in 1992.
- Law & Order: Binghamton is mentioned and shown in various episodes of all the Law & Order shows
- Pardon the Interruption: Tony Kornhiser went to Binghamton University and often mentions the school's basketball team
- Inside Deep Throat (2005): includes a discussion of the 1973 obscenity trial in Binghamton for showing Deep Throat at a local movie theater
- Alphas: numerous episodes reference Binghamton as the place where dangerous Alphas are sent.
- The Office: The episode "Turf War" (2012) focuses on the closing of the Binghamton branch of Sabre, with Jim, Andy, and Dwight visit a Binghamton business to woo them as a potential client
- Family Guy: in the episode "Valentine's Day in Quahog" (2013), Peter tells his ex-girlfriend that he will meet her in Binghamton for a Fine Young Cannibals concert
- Revenge: in the episode "Fear" (2013), Conrad mentions sending Victoria to an office in Binghamton to "christen a landfill"
- Based on a True Story: in the pilot episode ("The Great American Art Form", 2022), Ava and Matt both reveal that they grew up in the Binghamton area
- What We Do in the Shadows: in the episode "Freddie" (2022), Laszlo takes Baby Colin to perform at a vampire night club in Binghamton.
- The Marvelous Mrs. Maisel: in the episode "Susan" (2023), Midge mentions that the trash collector suit that she's wearing belongs to a man who is hiding out in Binghamton
- A Real Pain (2024): Benji lives in Binghamton, and discusses his home multiple times in the movie

== Binghamton in books ==
- A History of the Binghamton Slovaks, by Imrich Mazar: A chronicle of one of Binghamton's largest ethnic populations.
- From Vision to Excellence: A Popular History of Binghamton University, by Karen T. Hammond: Although Hammond's book focuses on the SUNY campus, it also provides interesting information on the city of Binghamton.
- Binghamton (Images of America), by Ed Aswad and Suzanne M. Meredith: A photographic history. There are several companion books dealing with IBM, Endicott, Johnson City, and baseball and hockey in Broome County.
- A Mind of Summer, by Erik Grayson: Includes "Tales of Three Cities", a short oral history of the greater Binghamton area.
- Diary of a Binghamton boy in the 1860s, by Morris Treadwell: Early Binghamton through the eyes of a young boy.
- Victorian Pride – Forgotten Songs of Central New York, by Diane Janowski, New York History Review Press: Includes 5 songs written in, or about Binghamton.
- Partners All: A History of Broome County, New York, by Gerald R. Smith.
- Working Lives, Broome County, New York, 1800–1930: A Social History of People at Work in Our Region, by Ross McGuire.
- Broome County Heritage: An Illustrated History, by Lawrence Bothwell.
- Broome County: A Contemporary Portrait, by Karen Hammond, Suzanne M. Meredith, Kirk Van Zandbergen, and Leslie Van Zandbergen.
- Actual Conversations With Myself, by Jeff Orlick: Includes many chapters based in and around the city of Binghamton and Binghamton University.
- A Picture Post-Card History of New York's Broome County Area — Binghamton, Johnson City, Endicott, Owego, and Surrounding Communities, published by the Kiwanis Club of Binghamton
- Tastes and Tales of New York's Southern Tier, by Paul VanSavage, Suzanne M. Meredith and Ed Aswad: Profiles of Binghamton area restaurants and other food related businesses.
- Drunkard's Refuge: The Lessons of the New York State Inebriate Asylum, by John W. Crowley and William L. White: Provides a history of the nation's first mental health facility to treat alcoholism as a disease (located on the grounds of the current Binghamton Psychiatric Center). The site of the facility is on the National Endangered Properties List.
- The Fear of Being Found, by Erin Elizabeth Smith: A collection of poems partially set in Binghamton.
- The Dark Paper Series, by local author Waldo Tomosky: Five anthologies (horror and otherwise).
- Joe and the Vinegar Pissers, by Waldo Tomosky: Centers on local youth in the 1940s who spend their time terrorizing their parents and the local fire chief.
- Going with the Pitch: Adjusting to Baseball, School, and Life as a Division I College Athlete, by Ken Jacobi: Focuses on Jacobi's college baseball experience while playing at Binghamton University.
- The Night Eternal, by Guillermo Del Toro and Chuck Hogan: Several characters stop for gas in Binghamton.
