= Binghamton Devils =

Former ice hockey team

- City: Binghamton, New York; Newark, New Jersey
- League: American Hockey League
- Division: North
- Founded: 1998
- Operated: 2017–2021
- Home arena: Floyd L. Maines Veterans Memorial Arena; Barnabas Health Hockey House
- Colors: Red, black, white
- Owner: Harris Blitzer Sports & Entertainment
- Media: Press & Sun-Bulletin; WICZ, WENE, WINR, WBBI, AHL.TV (Internet)
- Affiliates: New Jersey Devils (NHL); Adirondack Thunder (ECHL)

Franchise history
- 1998–2006: Lowell Lock Monsters
- 2006–2010: Lowell Devils
- 2010–2017: Albany Devils
- 2017–2021: Binghamton Devils
- 2021–present: Utica Comets

The Binghamton Devils were a professional ice hockey team in the American Hockey League (AHL) that played from 2017 to 2021 as the top minor league affiliate of the National Hockey League (NHL)'s New Jersey Devils.

During the 2017–18 and 2018–19 seasons, the Devils played home games at Floyd L. Maines Veterans Memorial Arena in Binghamton, New York. Amid the COVID-19 pandemic, the team played home games at the New Jersey Devils' practice arena in Newark, New Jersey for the 2020–21 season.

Following this, the team ultimately did not return to Binghamton, and instead relocated to Utica, New York to become the second incarnation of the Utica Comets beginning with the 2021–22 season.

== History ==
On September 26, 2016, shortly after it was announced that the Binghamton Senators were being purchased by their parent club and would move to Belleville, Ontario, for the 2017–18 season as the Belleville Senators, the Senators' management said they were working hard to keep AHL hockey in Binghamton for 2017–18 and beyond.

On January 25, 2017, the Times Union reported that the Albany Devils would move to Binghamton for 2017–18, citing the Devils' average per-game attendance of 2,888 being last in the AHL, although the Binghamton Senators' attendance had been second-to-last at 3,666. The official announcement of the team's move (and the Binghamton Devils name) was made on January 31, and noted that the organization had signed a five-year operating agreement. Over their first two seasons in Binghamton, the Devils' attendance increased to 3,896 and 3,471 per game.

Due to the effects of the COVID-19 pandemic, the New Jersey Devils moved their AHL affiliate to their practice rink for home games in Newark, New Jersey, for the 2020–21 season. In April 2021, it was reported there was an ongoing dispute between the local operators of the Binghamton Devils and the New Jersey Devils over moving the team to Newark for the season and demanding affiliation fees that Binghamton could not pay as a result of the pandemic. On April 5, a trademark was filed for the brand "Utica Devils" by Robert Esche, the operator of the Utica Comets, with the Comets' franchise license owned by the Vancouver Canucks. According to the B-Devils vice president of operations Tom Mitchell, on April 14, 2021, he was informed by the New Jersey Devils that they planned to move the franchise for the 2021–22 season. On May 6, the AHL approved the move to Utica, but retained the Comets branding already used by Esche with his current AHL club.

== Season-by-season results ==
| Regular season | | | | | | | | | | | | Playoffs | | | | |
| Season | Games | Won | Lost | OTL | SOL | Tied | Points | PCT | Goals for | Goals against | Standing | Year | 1st round | 2nd round | 3rd round | Finals |
|---|---|---|---|---|---|---|---|---|---|---|---|---|---|---|---|---|
| 2017–18 | 76 | 25 | 38 | 9 | 4 | — | 63 | .414 | 193 | 247 | 5th, North | 2018 | Did not qualify | | | |
| 2018–19 | 76 | 28 | 41 | 7 | 0 | — | 63 | .414 | 201 | 278 | 8th, North | 2019 | Did not qualify | | | |
| 2019–20 | 62 | 34 | 24 | 4 | 0 | — | 72 | .581 | 189 | 182 | 4th, North | 2020 | Season cancelled due to the COVID-19 pandemic | | | |
| 2020–21 | 35 | 7 | 20 | 5 | 2 | 1 (Note: A game between the Lehigh Valley Phantoms and Devils was suspended while tied and not completed, resulting in a 1–1 tie and a point for each team.) | 22 | .314 | 89 | 127 | 7th, North | 2021 | No playoffs were held | | | |
