= Washington House =

Washington House may refer to:

== Legislature ==
- Washington House of Representatives, legislative body of Washington State

== Places ==
- Washington-Wilkes Historical Museum, Washington, Georgia, on the National Register of Historic Places (NRHP)
- William B. and Julia Washington House, Leoti, Kansas, on the NRHP
- George Washington House (Bladensburg, Maryland)
- Washingtonian Hall, Endwell, New York
- Bill Washington Ranchhouse, Marietta, Oklahoma, listed on the NRHP in Love County, Oklahoma
- Heyward-Washington House, Charleston, South Carolina, NRHP-listed
- William Washington House, an 18th-century house in Charleston, South Carolina
- George Washington Boyhood Home Site, Fredericksburg, Virginia
- Mary Washington House, Fredericksburg, Virginia
- Colonel Lewis William Washington House, Halltown, West Virginia, NRHP-listed
- Charles Washington House, Charles Town, West Virginia

== See also ==
- Mount Vernon
- Washington's Headquarters (disambiguation)
- George Washington House (disambiguation)
- Washington Hall (disambiguation)
- Washington Hotel (disambiguation)
