= George Washington Hotel =

George Washington Hotel can refer to:

- George Washington Hotel (New York City)
- The George Washington Hotel (Pennsylvania), in Washington, Pennsylvania
- The George Washington Hotel (Winchester, Virginia)
- Hotel George Washington (Jacksonville), Florida

== See also ==
- Washington Hotel (disambiguation)
- George Washington House (disambiguation)
