= Washington Hall =

Washington Hall may refer to:

- Washington Hall, a museum in Colorado
- Washington Hall (hotel), an antebellum hotel in Atlanta, Georgia
- Washington Hall (University of Notre Dame), Indiana
- Washington Hall (University of Massachusetts, Amherst), a dormitory
- Washingtonian Hall, Endwell, New York
- Washington Hall (New York City), former hotel that served as Federalist Party meeting spot and banquet hall from 1812 to 1844
- Washington Hall (Nashville, Tennessee), former residence of American politician Luke Lea
- Washington Hall (Seattle), a historic performance hall and former fraternal hall in Washington

== See also ==
- Washington House (disambiguation)
- Washington Hotel (disambiguation)
- Washington New Hall, in Tyne and Wear, a house built by Sir Lowthian Bell, 1st Baronet
- Washington Old Hall, in Tyne and Wear
