= Variety (radio) =

Radio format

Variety is a radio format that plays music across numerous genres. Free-form variety is associated with a wide range of programming including talk, sports, and music from a wide spectrum. This format is usually found on smaller, non-commercial public broadcasting stations such as college radio, community radio or high school radio stations. If a variety-formatted station has a program director, that person exerts little if any influence on the music or other programming choices beyond the normal regulatory control required by that country's licensing regulations.

Variety is also associated with full-service radio. This format is primarily found in the rural United States, on commercial AM stations, and on a few FM public radio stations (usually those that play jazz). These stations tend to favor older listeners and play a mix of music that focuses more on older mainstream music, although much broader than the typical suburban oldies or classic hits station; a full-service station will often play music from the adult standards, classic country, adult contemporary or ethnic formats as well. Full-service radio also regularly includes room for local news and talk.

Adult Contemporary and similarly formatted stations often brand with "mix" and "variety" to demonstrate the fact that they play music from several decades. However, these stations have much more restrictive playlists than true variety stations such as those in the freeform and full-service categories. An example is WBNW-FM in Binghamton, New York or www.varietyradio.co.uk. The phrase "variety hits" is a synonym for the adult hits format (typified by the "Male First Name FM" branding), which indeed usually has a larger variety than a typical hot AC station.
