= WKGB =

The callsign WKGB can refer to:

- WKGB-TV, a television station (channel 29, virtual channel 53) licensed to Bowling Green, Kentucky, United States, part of the Kentucky Educational Television network
- WKGB-FM, a rock music station (92.5 FM) licensed to Conklin, New York, United States
