= Go Flip Yourself =

- What We Do in the Shadows episode
- Episode no.: Season 4 Episode 8
- Directed by: Yana Gorskaya
- Written by: Marika Sawyer
- Cinematography by: DJ Stipsen
- Editing by: Yana Gorskaya; Dane McMaster
- Production code: XWS04007
- Original air date: August 23, 2022
- Running time: 27 minutes

Guest appearances
- Nick Kroll as Simon the Devious; Jason Sklar as Toby; Randy Sklar as Bran; Parisa Fakhri as Marwa

Episode chronology
← Previous "Pine Barrens"	Next → "Freddie"

"Go Flip Yourself" is the eighth episode of the fourth season of the American mockumentary comedy horror television series What We Do in the Shadows, set in the franchise of the same name. It is the 38th overall episode of the series and was written by co-executive producer Marika Sawyer, and directed by co-executive producer Yana Gorskaya. It was released on FX on August 23, 2022.

The series is set in Staten Island, New York City. Like the 2014 film, the series follows the lives of vampires in the city. These consist of three vampires, Nandor, Laszlo, and Nadja. They live alongside Colin Robinson, an energy vampire; and Guillermo, Nandor's familiar. The series explores the absurdity and misfortunes experienced by the vampires. In the episode, the vampires take part in the newest episode of home-renovation show Go Flip Yourself.

According to Nielsen Media Research, the episode was seen by an estimated 0.287 million household viewers and gained a 0.09 ratings share among adults aged 18–49. The episode received extremely positive reviews from critics, who praised the episode's originality, directing and writing.

== Plot ==
Twins Bran (Randy Sklar) and Toby Daltry (Jason Sklar), hosts of home-renovation show Go Flip Yourself, arrive at the vampires' house. As they enter, Bran talks with Laszlo (Matt Berry), while Toby is killed by Nadja (Natasia Demetriou). They hypnotize Bran to believe his brother got sick, while Guillermo (Harvey Guillén) buries the body.

Bran offers many possible options for the renovation, which concerns Guillermo due to the possible exposure to sunlight. After considering, the vampires agree to Bran's plans. While helping the crew in the renovation, Guillermo pretends to be the city inspector to contact Bran regarding permits. He lets him know that Guillermo's room cannot be considered a room, for which he will have reallocate the budget and improve Guillermo's room. To do so, he will have to change the size of the vampires' renovated rooms to improve his room, with Guillermo "reluctantly" agreeing. Bran also shows Nandor and Marwa (Parisa Fakhri) the newly constructed "man cave" for Nandor, which he loves.

For the big reveal, Bran shows the newly renovated house to the vampires. However, the house remains practically the same, save for a new walk-in closet. When Laszlo finds that his witch's hat is missing, Bran reveals himself to be Simon the Devious (Nick Kroll). Simon reveals that he and his followers pitched and produced 150 episodes of Go Flip Yourself in order to gain access to the vampires' house, also admitting that Toby was actually a regular human whom he got involved into architecture. Simon and his followers flee with the hat. Despite that, the vampires note that conditions on the house have improved now that the hat is not there anymore. A promo shows the next episode of Go Flip Yourself, with Simon/Bran wearing the hat during the episode. As he turns on the oven to a couple, the house explodes.

== Production ==
=== Development ===
In July 2022, FX confirmed that the eighth episode of the season would be titled "Go Flip Yourself", and that it would be written by co-executive producer Marika Sawyer, and directed by co-executive producer Yana Gorskaya. This was Sawyer's sixth writing credit, and Gorskaya's 12th directing credit.

== Reception ==
=== Viewers ===
In its original American broadcast, "Go Flip Yourself" was seen by an estimated 0.287 million household viewers with a 0.09 in the 18-49 demographics. This means that 0.09 percent of all households with televisions watched the episode. This was a slight decrease in viewership from the previous episode, which was watched by 0.305 million household viewers with a 0.09 in the 18-49 demographics.

=== Critical reviews ===
"Go Flip Yourself" received extremely positive reviews from critics. William Hughes of The A.V. Club gave the episode a "B+" grade and wrote, "One of the great things about What We Do In The Shadows is that it so rarely repeats a joke. With the whole of the undead experience to sink its fangs into, the series is usually willing to go full-tilt into a fresh idea every single week — and 'Go Flip Yourself' is, mostly, a great example of that energy. That goes all the way up to the central conceit of the episode, which swaps out the documentary crew that normally records the State Island vamps' bloody antics with the team behind Laszlo's favorite home-reno show, Go Flip Yourself."

Katie Rife of Vulture gave the episode a 4 star rating out of 5 and wrote, "The one thing about this episode that didn’t totally work for me was the resolution. Don't get me wrong, it's lovely to see Simon the Devious again. [...] But their reappearance was a bit of a deus ex machina, a way to write the episode out of the corner it wrote itself into by having the vampires expose themselves on television. The bit I found much more clever was the show writing itself out of having to redo all of its sets." Tony Sokol of Den of Geek wrote, "'Go Flip Yourself' is a well-constructed comic episode, fully committing to the absurdity of every possible action. The installment not only pokes holes in the infrastructure of DIY shows, but tears the foundation of What We Do in the Shadows' own mock-doc-horror-schlock genre to its silliest core. All reality shows are scary, and if the city planners don't get you, bad planning will. The episode is flush with load bearing one-liners, obviously scripted, but tossed off as if they are ad libs."

Melody McCune of Telltale TV gave the episode a 4.5 star rating out of 5 and wrote, "Overall, 'Go Flip Yourself' is a stellar show-within-a-show presentation, parodying home renovation series while doing it with What We Do in the Shadows' trademark Gothic flair, sharp-as-a-stake wit, and plenty of horse saddles for Nandor's man cave." Alejandra Bodden of Bleeding Cool gave the episode a 9.5 out of 10 rating and wrote, "This week's episode of FX's What We Do in the Shadows, 'Go Flip Yourself,' takes us on a very fun ride with quite an unimaginable turn that had us nearly in tears of laughter."
