= Union Volunteer Emergency Squad =

- Motto: "Providing exemplary emergency medical services with care & compassion, since 1972."
- Established: 1972
- Headquarters: Endwell, NY
- Jurisdiction: Town of Union, NY (Endicott, Endwell, Johnson City, Union Center)
- Employees: 74
- Ambulances: 8 Type-III
- Director: Matthew Fellows
- Website: www.unionems.com

The Union Volunteer Emergency Squad (UVES) provides emergency services for the Town of Union, New York, USA. It has stations in Endwell, New York; Johnson City, New York; and Endicott, New York.

== History ==
In 1972, residents of the Town of Union recognized a need for emergency medical services and ambulance transport. A building was obtained at Hooper Road School on Main Street in Endwell, and the ambulance squad was placed in the basement.

In 1973, UVES was established as a volunteer service and responded to their first call on June 1. Over the next 2 years, UVES established itself and became a training center for Broome County and helped to establish other ambulance services.

In 1975 West Endicott dissolved its ambulance service and was merged with UVES. In the same year, Johnson City Fire Department requested UVES help with establishing their ambulance and UVES help purchase their 1st ambulance.

As UVES developed and grew from a basic life support (BLS) ambulance service, it acquired a cardiac monitor, and with help from United Health Services it soon gained a designated "Heart Mobile" ambulance staffed with "Cardiac Care" Techs (specialized EMTs). Advanced life support (ALS) response was started in June 1975.

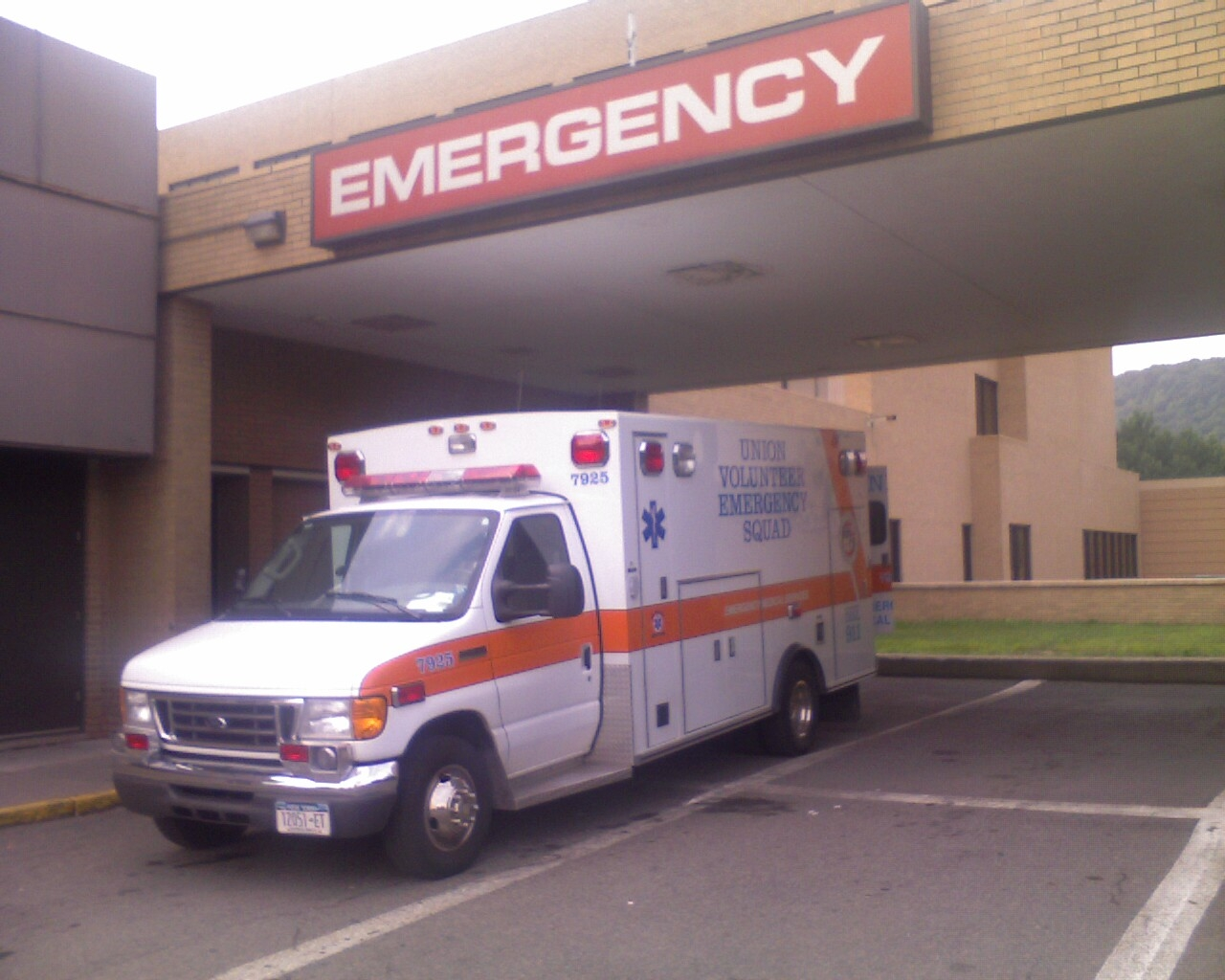
Ambulance 7925 at Our Lady of Lourdes Hospital Emergency Room

The facilities remained at and responses were from the Hooper Road station until 1983, when Union acquired a new 'Central Station' on Avenue B in Endwell, NY, that was dedicated later in the year. As UVES call and response volume increased, several more station were acquired to help spread resources over Union response district. In 1987, a property already owned by Union was donated to UVES at Maple Street in Endicott, and soon a station was built, where ambulances and squad members could be stationed. Several response headquarters were opened in Johnson City, NY, and in 1990 a single building was deemed "Panko Station" (named after Nick Panko for his efforts) which housed additional ambulances and squad members. Out of these 3 stations, the entirely volunteer squad responded to a rising call volume of 3,000 calls per year.

In 1992, as call volume increased exponentially for UVES ambulance services, they hired a director of operations who established a third-party billing system. After the billing system was established, extra resources were available, and 4 full-time compensated members were hired to help fulfill the increasing demand. Later that year, UVES began providing on-duty EMS coverage 24 hours a day 7 days a week.

Until 2003, UVES was operated entirely from the revenue generated from the third-party billing. In fall of 2003, Union presented to the residence and passed legislation that allowed for a tax district to support ambulances. Later that year, UVES ventured into new territory and started to provide non-emergency transport services for health care services in Union. New vehicles and employees helped with this venture which has now ceased due to operational pitfalls. Both the tax district that was established along with the new transport services and mutual aid helped with the increase in demand on the 911 system in Union.

To this day UVES responds to 11,000+ 911 calls and transports per year in Union and is staffed by 44 compensated employees, 30+ volunteer EMTs, and ambulance aids as a full staff agency.

== Communications ==
All 911-related emergency calls are dispatched through the consolidated Broome County Communications Center (BCCC) which coordinates all fire, most EMS and police dispatching for the county. The BCCC has advanced Computer Aided Dispatching (CAD), as well as dispatching all calls through the Emergency Medical Dispatch (EMD) system. All emergency dispatchers at BCCC hold the EMD certification.
