= Pine Barrens (What We Do in the Shadows) =

- What We Do in the Shadows episode
- Episode no.: Season 4 Episode 7
- Directed by: Kyle Newacheck
- Written by: Sarah Naftalis
- Cinematography by: DJ Stipsen
- Editing by: Liza Cardinale; Yana Gorskaya
- Production code: XWS04006
- Original air date: August 16, 2022
- Running time: 24 minutes

Guest appearances
- Anthony Atamanuik as Sean Rinaldi; Kristen Schaal as The Guide; Parisa Fakhri as Marwa

Episode chronology
← Previous "The Wedding"	Next → "Go Flip Yourself"

"Pine Barrens" is the seventh episode of the fourth season of the American mockumentary comedy horror television series What We Do in the Shadows, set in the franchise of the same name. It is the 37th overall episode of the series and was written by producer Sarah Naftalis, and directed by co-executive producer Kyle Newacheck. It was released on FX on August 16, 2022.

The series is set in Staten Island, New York City. Like the 2014 film, the series follows the lives of vampires in the city. These consist of three vampires, Nandor, Laszlo, and Nadja. They live alongside Colin Robinson, an energy vampire; and Guillermo, Nandor's familiar. The series explores the absurdity and misfortunes experienced by the vampires. In the episode, Laszlo and Nandor accompany Sean on a trip to his cabin, while Guillermo decides to invite his family to the house.

According to Nielsen Media Research, the episode was seen by an estimated 0.305 million household viewers and gained a 0.09 ratings share among adults aged 18–49. The episode received positive reviews, with critics praising the storylines, performances, humor and themes.

== Plot ==
Sean (Anthony Atamanuik) takes Laszlo (Matt Berry), Nandor (Kayvan Novak) and Baby Colin (Mark Proksch) for a weekend getaway at his family cabin in the New Jersey Pine Barrens. While Sean sleeps, Laszlo and Nandor intend to go hunting humans in the woods, although their constant arguments with each other prove to be a problem.

With the vampires leaving, Guillermo (Harvey Guillén) decides to invite some of his family members to the house. However, Nadja (Natasia Demetriou) is still in the house and introduces herself to his family. As a favor, she agrees to pretend to be his girlfriend and maid. However, Guillermo's grandmother warns him that as she is a descendant of Van Helsing, she can feel in her instincts that Nadja is a vampire. Soon, the whole family gets aggressive and start chasing Nadja through the house with stakes. Guillermo stops them from harming her, admitting that he works for vampires with the intent of becoming a vampire himself. He then comes out as gay to his family, with his family proudly accepting him. She erases their memories of the events, but maintains their memory of Guillermo coming out.

The conflict between Laszlo and Nandor escalates when Laszlo accidentally shoots him with a gun. When Baby Colin escapes the cabin, they are forced to go out to find him. After finding him, Laszlo and Nandor reconcile after acknowledging they enjoyed spending more time together. They return to the cabin, finding Sean being attacked by the Jersey Devil. Their attempts at fighting the Devil prove fruitless, until Colin starts playing "Livin' on a Prayer". This incapacitates the Devil, allowing Laszlo and Nandor to drain him, while Sean accidentally shoots himself in the foot with a shotgun. They return home, where they hang the Devil's severed head on the wall.

== Production ==
=== Development ===
In August 2022, FX confirmed that the seventh episode of the season would be titled "Pine Barrens", and that it would be written by producer Sarah Naftalis, and directed by co-executive producer Kyle Newacheck. This was Naftalis' fourth writing credit, and Newacheck's 11th directing credit.

== Reception ==
=== Viewers ===
In its original American broadcast, "Pine Barrens" was seen by an estimated 0.305 million household viewers with a 0.09 in the 18-49 demographics. This means that 0.09 percent of all households with televisions watched the episode. This was a 19% decrease in viewership from the previous episode, which was watched by 0.372 million household viewers with a 0.12 in the 18-49 demographics.

=== Critical reviews ===
"Pine Barrens" received positive reviews. William Hughes of The A.V. Club gave the episode an "A–" grade and wrote, "Whether we're talking about Nandor's childish misunderstandings, or Laszlo's caddish indifference, both of these guys are wrecking balls, and they tend to work best when paired up opposite characters capable of a bit of gentle steering. Which is exactly what the two of them are deprived of tonight, as Laszlo and Nandor head off into the woods with nothing but Baby Colin, a terrifically miserable Sean, and a whole lot of firearms to 'distract' them from their alpha-male posturing. It's thus sort of amazing that this plotline is still not the most dramatic or entertaining part of tonight's episode."

Katie Rife of Vulture gave the episode a perfect 5 star rating out of 5 and wrote, "The best episodes of What We Do in the Shadows are the ones that bring the whole gang together. So 'Pine Barrens', an episode that divides the characters into three separate story lines really has no business being as delightful as it is. This week's episode, which explores the nuances of one underdeveloped dynamic on the show and adds humanizing layers to a couple of the newer ones, is about as heartwarming as What We Do in the Shadows gets." Tony Sokol of Den of Geek gave the episode a perfect 5 star rating out of 5 and wrote, "'Pine Barrens' is an extremely enjoyable return to form, which moves What We Do in the Shadows forward in character development and overall charm. It is a well-paced comic outing with several hysterically dangerous sequences."

Melody McCune of Telltale TV gave the episode a 4.5 star rating out of 5 and wrote, "'Pine Barrens' boasts excellent beats and reveals featuring our fave cinnamon roll Guillermo, with Harvey Guillén injecting him with such softness and vulnerability, while Novak and Berry bless us with some of the funniest moments in the episode. It's a solid outing in the What We Do in the Shadows canon." Alejandra Bodden of Bleeding Cool gave the episode a 9 out of 10 rating and wrote, "This week's episode of FX's What We Do in the Shadows, 'Pine Barrens', explored connection, family, lies, and girls' night out. Well, there were several things I really enjoyed in this episode, especially the shifts in some of the dynamics we have seen this season and throughout the show so far."
