= WLTB =

- Johnson City, New York; United States
- Broadcast area: Greater Binghamton
- Frequency: 101.7 MHz
- Branding: Magic 101.7

Programming
- Format: Rock hits
- Subchannels: HD2: Classic hits

Ownership
- Owner: GM Broadcasting

History
- First air date: September 1972
- Former call signs: WEBO-FM (1972–1979); WWWT (1979–1985); WQWT (1985–1987); WQXT (1987–1992); WGRG (1992–1998)
- Call sign meaning: "Lite Binghamton"

Technical information
- Licensing authority: FCC
- Facility ID: 71400
- Class: A
- ERP: 580 watts
- HAAT: 312 meters (1,024 ft)
- Transmitter coordinates: 42.056°N 75.944°W
- Translator: HD2: 102.5 W273AB (Vestal)

Links
- Public license information: Public file; LMS
- Webcast: Listen Live; HD2: Listen live
- Website: magic1017fm.com HD2: 1025thevault.com

WLTB (101.7 FM, "Magic 101.7") is a radio station licensed to Johnson City, New York, United States, and serving the Greater Binghamton market. Owned locally by GM Broadcasting, the station broadcasts a rock hits format. The studios are located in Endwell, with a transmitter on Ingraham Hill in Binghamton. A translator, W273AB (102.5 FM), programs a second format of classic hits music.

== History ==
WEBO Radio, Inc., the owner of WEBO (1330 AM), applied for a construction permit to build a new FM radio station in Owego on September 23, 1971, and received a construction permit on January 17, 1972. WEBO-FM went on the air on September 3rd 1972 from a new tower in South Owego. It extended the service of WEBO, a daytime-only station, to nighttime hours. Operation remained much the same until March 1, 1979, when WEBO-FM became WWWT "3WT" and flipped to an all-disco format, except for morning drive when it continued to simulcast the AM. The disco format gave way within several months to a straight contemporary hit radio approach.

WWWT's hit radio gave way to adult contemporary in October 1985 as WQWT "The Lite Q", aiming for an older demographic than it had under its previous format. The station returned to the hits, this time as WQXT "Q102", in 1987; two years later, the station activated a new tower and transmitter site on Bornt Hill, expanding its coverage area. By 1991, when the Aubol family retired and sold WEBO and WQXT to Steven Gilinsky, it had changed to an oldies format. The call letters were changed to WGRG in 1992, and by that September the station reverted to CHR known as Power 101; W273AB (102.5 FM), a translator in Binghamton, was added the next year. By 1996, the format changed to alternative rock.

WGRG became WLTB "Lite 101.7", a soft adult contemporary station, in 1998. The call sign was retained in 2001 when the station shifted to hot adult contemporary as "Magic 101.7". Since that time, the station has changed formats three times while keeping the moniker, starting in 2016 by returning to CHR known as Binghamton's #1 Hit Music Station. In 2021, the station adopted an Adult Hits format, and in 2022, changed formats once more to Rock Hits.

The station has an HD subchannel called "The Vault", which began in 2017 and replaced the 102.5 simulcast of WLTB.

Gilinsky, who had previously sold 75 percent of WLTB to Thomas Mollen, repurchased his stake in the station in 2015.
