= Washington's Headquarters =

Washington's Headquarters may refer to:

- Ford Mansion, Morristown, New Jersey, December 1, 1779 to June 7, 1780
- George Washington's Headquarters (Cumberland, Maryland), as a colonel in 1755 to 1758, revisited as US Commander in Chief in 1794
- Longfellow House–Washington's Headquarters National Historic Site, Cambridge, Massachusetts, July 1775 to April 1776
- Keith House (Upper Makefield Township, Pennsylvania), December 14 to 24, 1776
- Moland House, Hartsville, Warwick Township, Bucks County, Pennsylvania
- Washington's Headquarters (Valley Forge), Pennsylvania, December 24, 1777 to June 18, 1778
- Washington's Headquarters State Historic Site, Newburgh, New York, April 1782 to August 1783

== See also ==
- Washington House (disambiguation)
- List of Washington's Headquarters during the Revolutionary War
