= Patterson-Hooper Family Cemetery =

Historic cemetery in New York, United States

- U.S. National Register of Historic Places
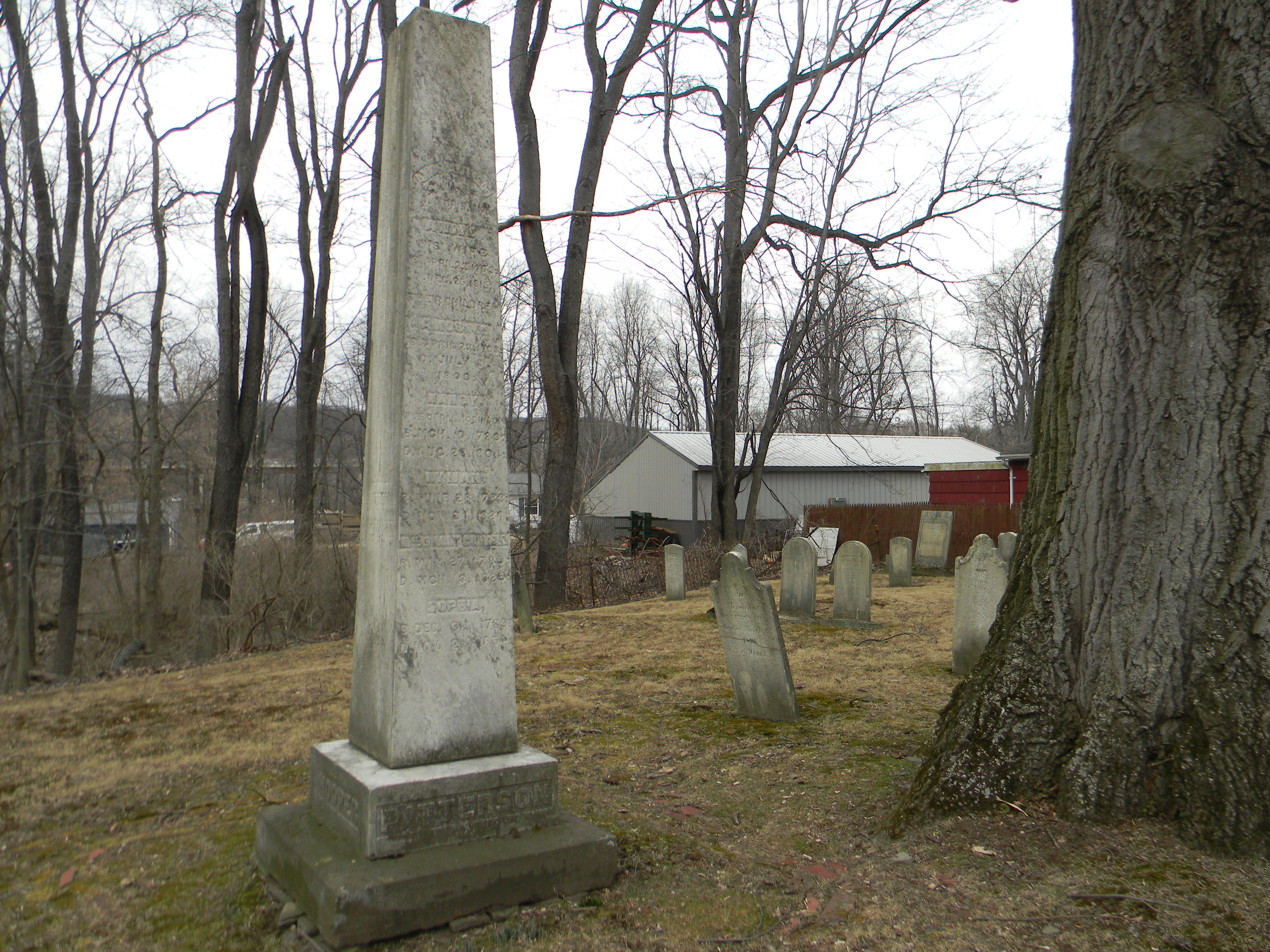
- Patterson-Hooper Cemetery, February 2012

- Location within New York Location within the United States
- Location: River Rd., Endwell, New York
- Coordinates: 42°6′31″N 76°00′26″W
- Area: less than one acre
- NRHP reference No.: 08000447
- Added to NRHP: May 21, 2008

Patterson-Hooper Family Cemetery is a historic cemetery located at Endwell in Broome County, New York. The cemetery was originally part of the Amos Patterson family farm and the first burials occurred in 1800 and 1804. A single large obelisk marking the center of the plot memorializes members of the Patterson family. Burials date from 1800 to 1910 with the majority before 1850.

It was listed on the National Register of Historic Places in 2008.
