= George Washington House =

George Washington House may refer to:

- George Washington House (Bladensburg, Maryland), in Prince George's County
- George Washington Boyhood Home Site, Fredericksburg, Virginia
- George Washington House (Barbados), a house where young George Washington and his brother stayed for a time.
- Mount Vernon, Washington's Virginia estate

== See also ==
- Washington House (disambiguation)
