= Union, New York =

- Town
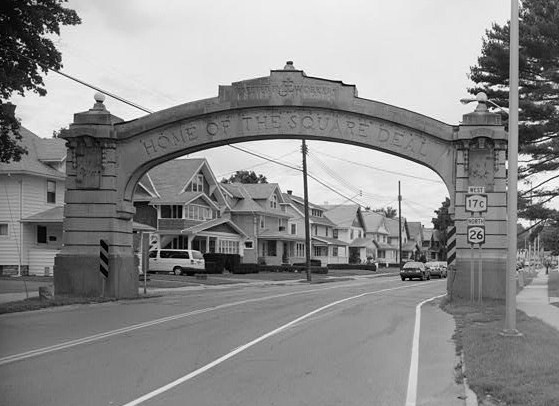
- Village of Endicott

- Seal

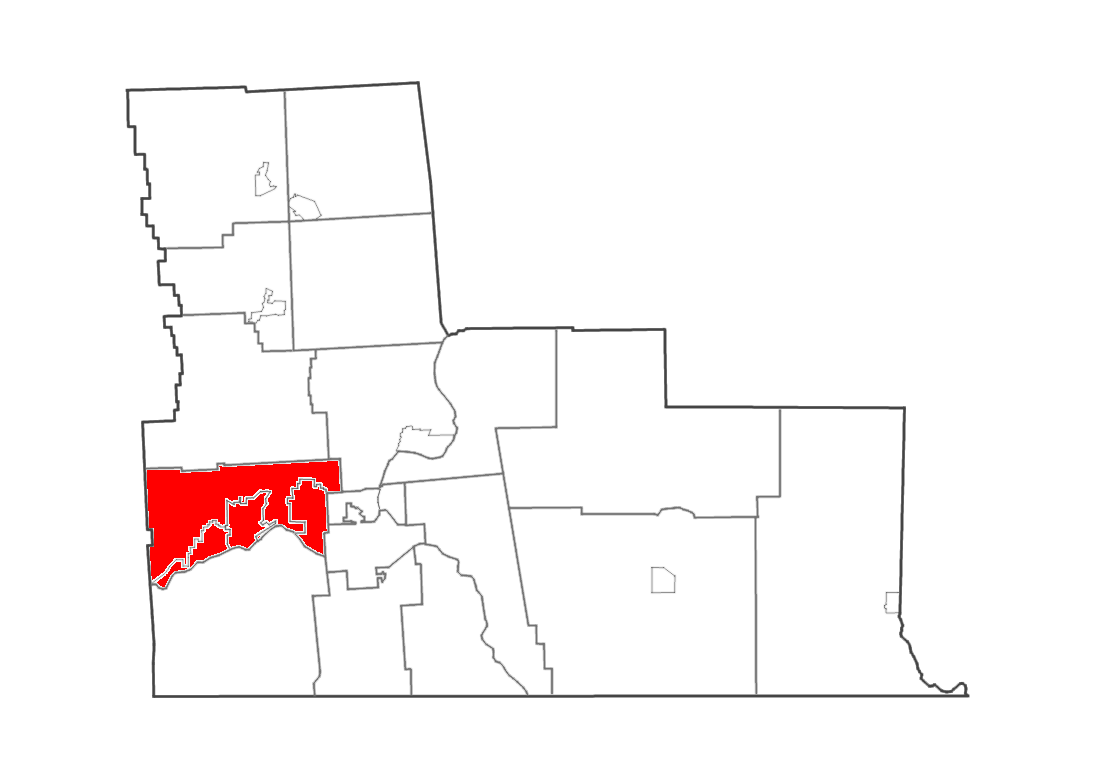
- Location in Broome County

- Location within New York Location within the United States
- Coordinates: 42°6′53″N 76°1′18″W
- Country: United States
- State: New York
- County: Broome
- Established: 1791

Government
  - Type: Town Council
  - Town Supervisor: Robert Mack (Town Supervisor)
  - Town Council: Members' List: • Thomas Augostini; • Frank Bertoni; • Joseph Nirchi, Sr; • David Kudgus

Area
  - Total: 36.02 sq mi (93.30 km^{2})
  - Land: 35.47 sq mi (91.86 km^{2})
  - Water: 0.56 sq mi (1.44 km^{2}) 1.49%
- Elevation: 981 ft (299 m)

Population (2010)
  - Total: 56,346
  - Estimate (2016): 54,790
  - Density: 1,544.8/sq mi (596.45/km^{2})
- Time zone: UTC-5 (EST)
  - Summer (DST): UTC-4 (EDT)
- ZIP Codes: 13760, 13761, 13763 (Endicott); 13762 (Endwell); 13790 (Johnson City); 13905 (Binghamton)
- FIPS code: 36-76056
- GNIS feature ID: 979572
- Website: www.townofunion.com

Union is a town in Broome County, New York, United States. As of the 2010 census, the town had a total population of 56,346. The name derives from the town having served as a rendezvous for the Sullivan Expedition.

The town is in the south-central part of the county, west of Binghamton. The communities of Union form the western suburbs of Binghamton. Two communities, the villages of Johnson City and Endicott, along with Binghamton, make up the "Triple Cities."

== History ==
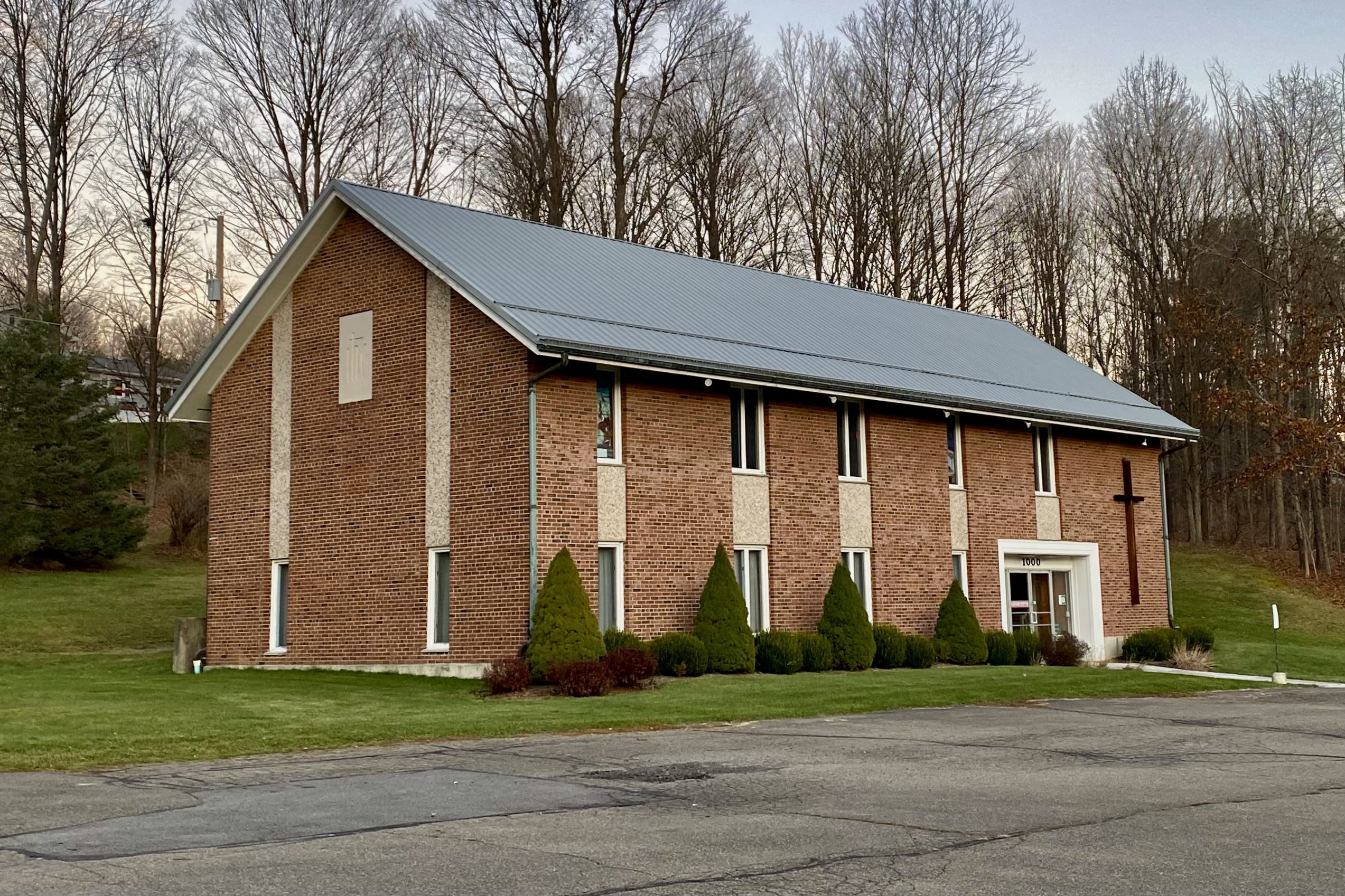
Wesley United Methodist Church

The region was first settled by Americans/Europeans circa 1782.

During the American Revolution, detachments of soldiers were sent through this region with the intent of attacking natives who were friendly to the British. Documented attacks on native villages in present-day Binghamton, Vestal, and Choconut Township, Pennsylvania, indicate that many natives were killed in these incursions in 1779.

Nearby the present town of Union was the Native American village of Choconut/Chugnut. Consisting of 50-60 homes, it was destroyed by General Poor's forces during the Sullivan Expedition on the morning of August 18, 1779. General Clinton's forces, which had been moving down the Susquehanna, united with Poor's forces at the destroyed village later that day, giving the modern town of Union its name.

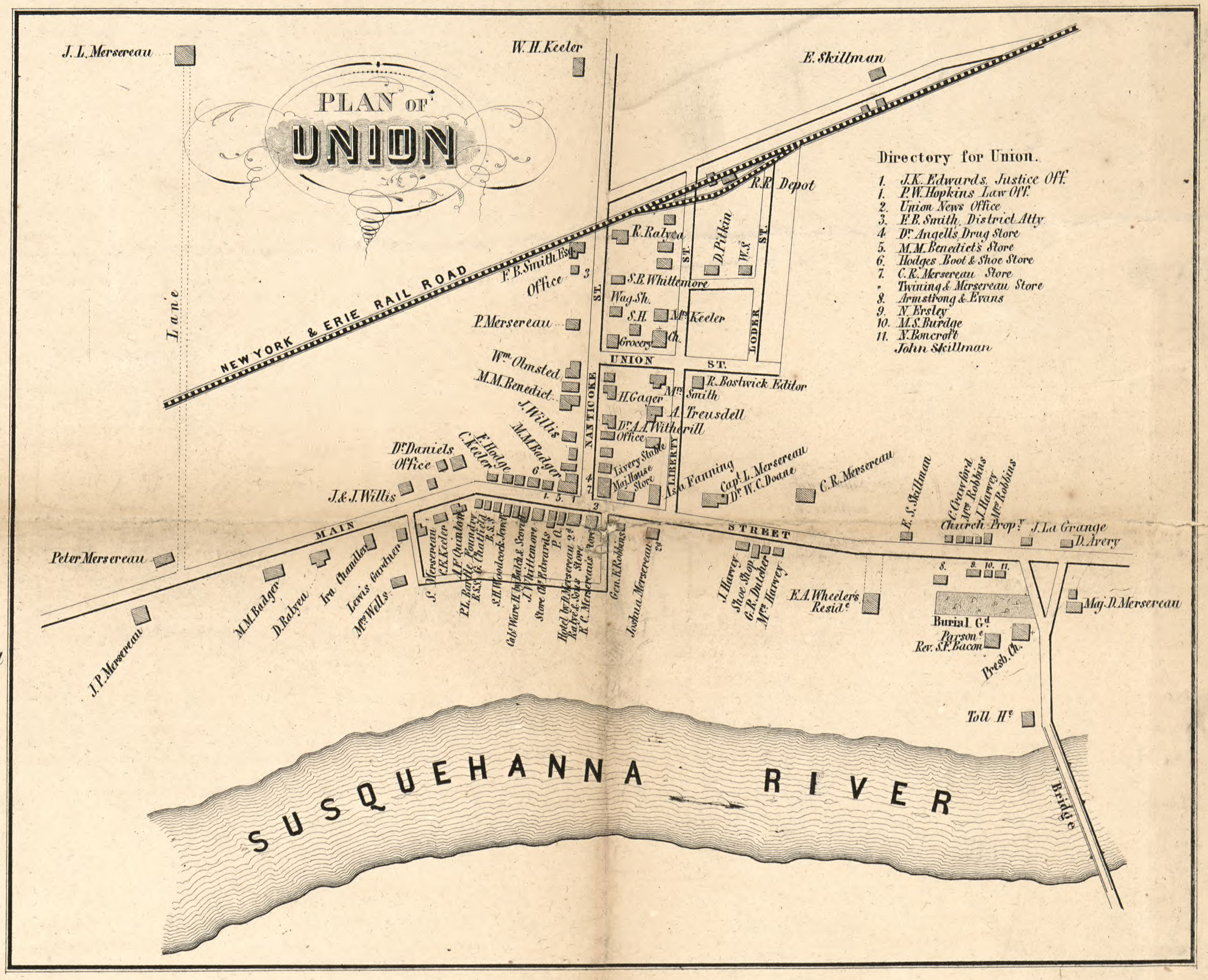
Plan of Union (1855)

The town of Union was established in 1791, while in Tioga County before the creation of Broome County. The town, a "mother town" of the county, was later reduced in size by the formation of other towns, the first being the town of Owego (then called the "Town of Tioga") in 1800, followed by Lisle (1801), Greene (1808, now in Chenango County), Vestal (1823), and Maine (1848).

== Geography ==
According to the United States Census Bureau, the town of Union has a total area of 36.0 square miles (93.2 km^{2}), of which 35.4 square miles (91.8 km^{2}) is land and 0.54 square miles (1.4 km^{2}), or 1.49%, is water.

Union is on the north side of the Susquehanna River.

New York State Route 17 crosses from the north to the south side of the Susquehanna in Union. New York State Route 26 and New York State Route 38B intersect by Union Center. NY-26 connects Union to the town of Vestal on the south side of the Susquehanna River. New York State Route 17C is an east–west highway in the south part of Union.

== Demographics ==
Historical population
Census	Pop.	Note	%±
1820	2,037		—
1830	2,122		4.2%
1840	3,165		49.2%
1850	2,143		−32.3%
1860	2,092		−2.4%
1870	2,538		21.3%
1880	2,596		2.3%
1890	2,711		4.4%
1900	5,707		110.5%
1910	9,486		66.2%
1920	25,651		170.4%
1930	42,579		66.0%
1940	50,195		17.9%
1950	55,676		10.9%
1960	64,423		15.7%
1970	64,490		0.1%
1980	61,179		−5.1%
1990	59,786		−2.3%
2000	56,266		−5.9%
2010	56,346		0.1%
2020	56,161		−0.3%
2025 (est.)	53,972		−3.9%
U.S. Decennial Census

As of the census of 2000, there were 56,298 people, 24,538 households, and 14,551 families residing in the town. The population density was 1,600.8 inhabitants per square mile (618.1/km^{2}). There were 26,507 housing units at an average density of 753.7 per square mile (291.0/km^{2}). The racial makeup of the town was 92.72% White, 2.45% African American, 0.17% Native American, 2.68% Asian, 0.03% Pacific Islander, 0.58% from other races, and 1.38% from two or more races. Hispanic or Latino of any race were 1.53% of the population.

There were 24,538 households, out of which 26.1% had children under the age of 18 living with them, 45.0% were married couples living together, 10.9% had a female householder with no husband present, and 40.7% were non-families. 34.5% of all households were made up of individuals, and 13.6% had someone living alone who was 65 years of age or older. The average household size was 2.24 and the average family size was 2.90.

In the town, the population was spread out, with 21.9% under the age of 18, 8.4% from 18 to 24, 28.5% from 25 to 44, 22.4% from 45 to 64, and 18.9% who were 65 years of age or older. The median age was 40 years. For every 100 females, there were 90.1 males. For every 100 females age 18 and over, there were 86.8 males.

The median income for a household in the town was $34,101, and the median income for a family was $46,170. Males had a median income of $35,891 versus $24,120 for females. The per capita income for the town was $20,077. About 8.3% of families and 11.3% of the population were below the poverty line, including 16.4% of those under age 18 and 6.0% of those age 65 or over.

== Communities and locations in the Town of Union ==
- Choconut Center – A hamlet in the northeastern part of the town at the junction of County Roads 45 and 97.
- Endicott – The village of Endicott is on the north bank of the Susquehanna River in the western part of Union.
- Endwell – A hamlet (and census-designated place) between Endicott and Johnson City. It was formerly known as "Hooper".
- Johnson City – The village of Johnson City is adjacent to the city of Binghamton and is on the north bank of the Susquehanna River at the east town line.
- Tri-Cities Airport (CZG) – A general aviation airport in the southwestern corner of Union.
- Union Center – A hamlet by the northern town line on NY-26 bordering West Corners and Endwell.
- West Corners – A hamlet north of Endicott, located on NY 26.
- Westover – A hamlet lying along the western border of the village of Johnson City.
- West Endicott – A hamlet bordering Endicott and West Corners.

== See also ==
- Union Volunteer Emergency Squad
