= WINR =

- Binghamton, New York; United States
- Broadcast area: Greater Binghamton
- Frequency: 680 kHz
- Branding: US 96.9

Programming
- Format: Classic Country
- Affiliations: Premiere Networks; New York Yankees Radio Network

Ownership
- Owner: iHeartMedia; (iHM Licenses, LLC)
- Sister stations: WBBI, WBNW-FM, WENE, WKGB-FM, WMXW

History
- First air date: August 5, 1946; 80 years ago
- Former frequencies: 1490 kHz (1946–1952)
- Call sign meaning: "Winner" (former branding)

Technical information
- Licensing authority: FCC
- Facility ID: 67191
- Class: B
- Power: 5,000 watts (day); 500 watts (night)
- Transmitter coordinates: 42°06′53″N 75°51′16″W
- Translator: 96.9 W245BV (Endwell)

Links
- Public license information: Public file; LMS
- Webcast: Listen live (via iHeartRadio)
- Website: us969.iheart.com

WINR (680 AM, "US 96.9") is a commercial radio station broadcasting a classic country format licensed to Binghamton, New York, and owned by iHeartMedia, Inc. WINR's studios are on North Jensen Road in Vestal.

By day, WINR is powered at 5,000 watts. Since 680 AM is a clear channel frequency, WINR must reduce power at night to 500 watts to protect other stations from interference. Programming is also heard on FM translator 96.9 W245BV in Endwell. It uses the FM dial position in its moniker, "U.S. 96.9."

== History ==
WINR's logo as an adult standards station.

=== Early years ===
WINR is Binghamton's second-oldest radio station, signing on the air on August 5, 1946, at 1490 kilocycles. It was an affiliate of the NBC Red Network. The station was founded by the Southern Tier Radio Service, Inc., a firm owned by Donald W. Kramer (1907–1986), a Binghamton attorney who later served as that city's mayor from 1950 until 1957.

Early print advertisements for the station, such as in the Binghamton Press and Broadcasting magazine featured the likeness of locally raised thoroughbred Exterminator, winner of the 1918 Kentucky Derby who served as the inspiration for the WINR call letters ("Winner").

In April 1951 the Federal Communications Commission granted WINR permission to relocate from 1490 to its present dial location at 680 AM. The move occurred in early 1952.

=== TV station ===
In August 1954, WINR was awarded a construction permit to build Binghamton's second television station. It took the call letters WINR-TV (channel 40) when it went on the air in November 1957. Several months earlier in January 1957, Southern Tier Radio Service sold WINR and its channel 40 permit to the Binghamton Press, an arm of the then-Rochester-based Gannett Company newspaper chain. WINR-TV was primarily an NBC affiliate, since the radio station also carried NBC programming.

Gannett split up the stations through separate sales in 1971: WINR radio was sold to a Mobile, Alabama-based broadcaster, while WINR-TV went to tower manufacturer Stainless, Inc., which changed that outlet's call sign to WICZ-TV.

=== Standards, oldies and classic country ===
In the early 1980s, WINR switched to an adult standards format. Its core artists included Frank Sinatra, Dean Martin, Barbra Streisand and Nat King Cole. In the early 2000s, WINR was host to the nationally syndicated nightly adult standards radio program "The Clinton Ferro Program" starring Clinton Ferro. It ran from 2000 to 2002. The show was syndicated in 82 markets nationwide until Ferro's death in 2002.

On January 25, 2012, WINR changed its format from adult standards to oldies, branded as "Oldies 680". On April 11, 2013, WINR rebranded as "Oldies 96-9" after the station added an FM translator, W245BV (96.9 FM) in Endwell.

On December 8, 2014, WINR changed its format to classic country. It began calling itself the moniker "US 96.9".
