= WBBI =

- Endwell, New York; United States
- Broadcast area: Binghamton, New York
- Frequency: 107.5 MHz
- Branding: New Country B107.5

Programming
- Format: Country
- Affiliations: Premiere Networks

Ownership
- Owner: iHeartMedia; (iHM Licenses, LLC)
- Sister stations: WBNW-FM, WENE, WINR, WKGB-FM, WMXW

History
- First air date: 1998; 28 years ago
- Call sign meaning: "Big Binghamton" or "Binghamton Big" (previous branding)

Technical information
- Licensing authority: FCC
- Facility ID: 18899
- Class: A
- ERP: 2,200 watts
- HAAT: 166 meters (545 ft)
- Transmitter coordinates: 42.138°N 75.999°W

Links
- Public license information: Public file; LMS
- Webcast: Listen Live
- Website: b1075country.iheart.com

WBBI (107.5 FM, "New Country B107.5") is a commercial radio station licensed to Endwell, New York, and serving the Greater Binghamton area. The station is owned by iHeartMedia and broadcasts a country music format. The station's studios are located in Vestal, and its transmitter is on Robinson Hill Road in Endicott.

== History ==
WBBI signed on in 1998 as country-formatted "B107.5." On March 31, 2003, the station ended the country format. An April Fools' Day prank in 2003 rebranded the station as rhythmic CHR, "107.5 Kiss-FM". The following day, WBBI announced it was time to say "Kiss off!" and flipped to classic rock, its new permanent format, branded as "Pure Classic Rock, 107.5 The Bear." The first play on the rechristened "The Bear" was "Won't Get Fooled Again" by The Who.

On September 15, 2010, WBBI changed its format from classic rock to classic hits, identified as "Big 107.5". On April 15, 2013, WBBI reverted to a country format, reviving the "B107.5" identity.
