= Paris Hotel (San Diego) =

Historic building in San Diego, California, U.S.

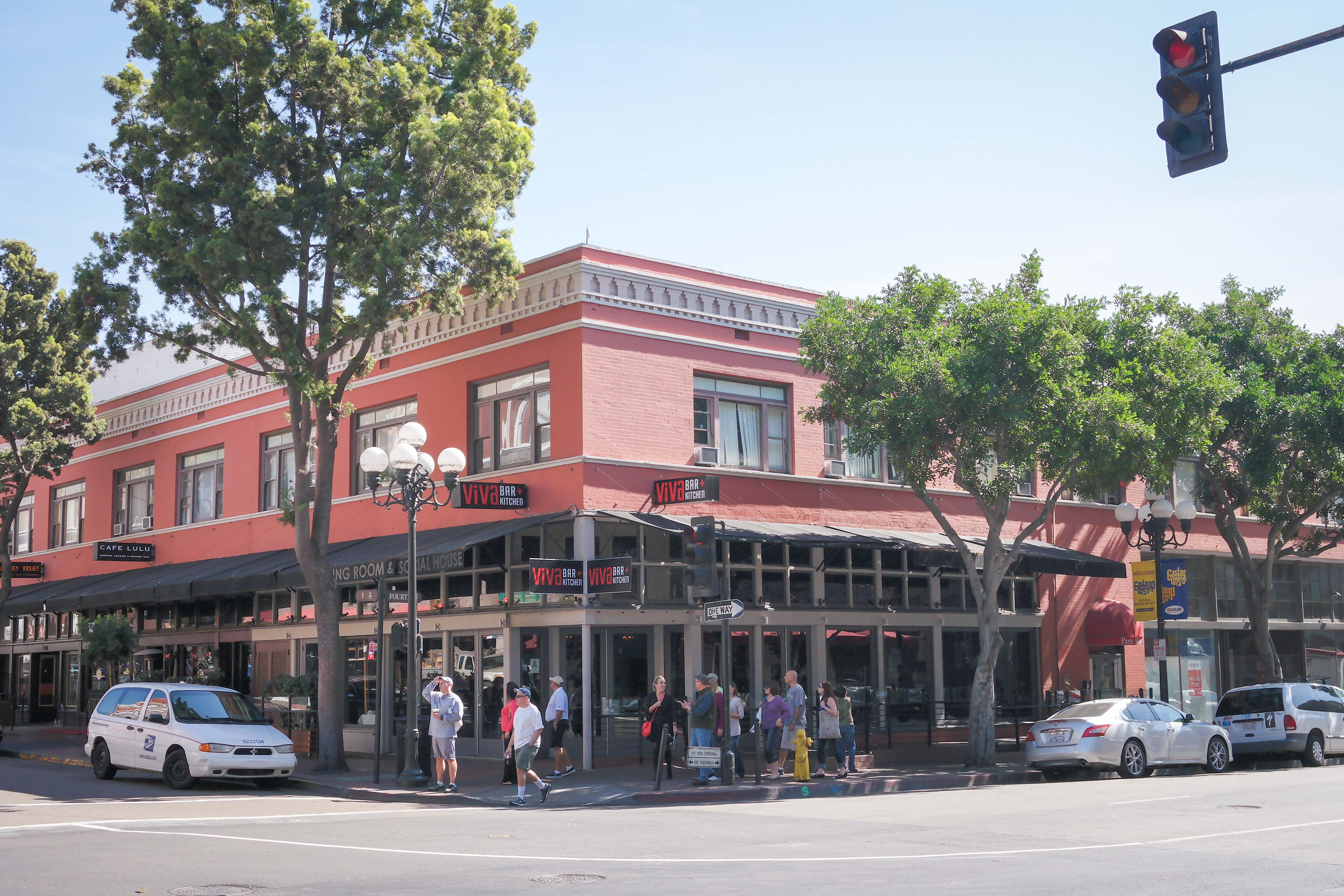
- The building's exterior in 2014
- Interactive map of the Paris Hotel area

General information
- Location: San Diego, California, 759 4th Avenue
- Coordinates: 32.713°N 117.161°W
- Opening: 1910
- Owner: DRA Enterprises
- Operator: Embassy English

Technical details
- Floor count: 2

Website
- Gaslamp Quarter entry

The Paris Hotel, formerly known as the Washington Hotel, is a historic building located at 759 4th Avenue in San Diego's Gaslamp Quarter, in the U.S. state of California. It was built in 1910 and is currently owned by DRA Enterprises. Accommodations within the facilities are either shared or separate, and included en-suite bathrooms and twice weekly housekeeping services.

== History ==
The Paris Hotel opened as the Washington Hotel in 1910, before changing names to the Paris Hotel years later.

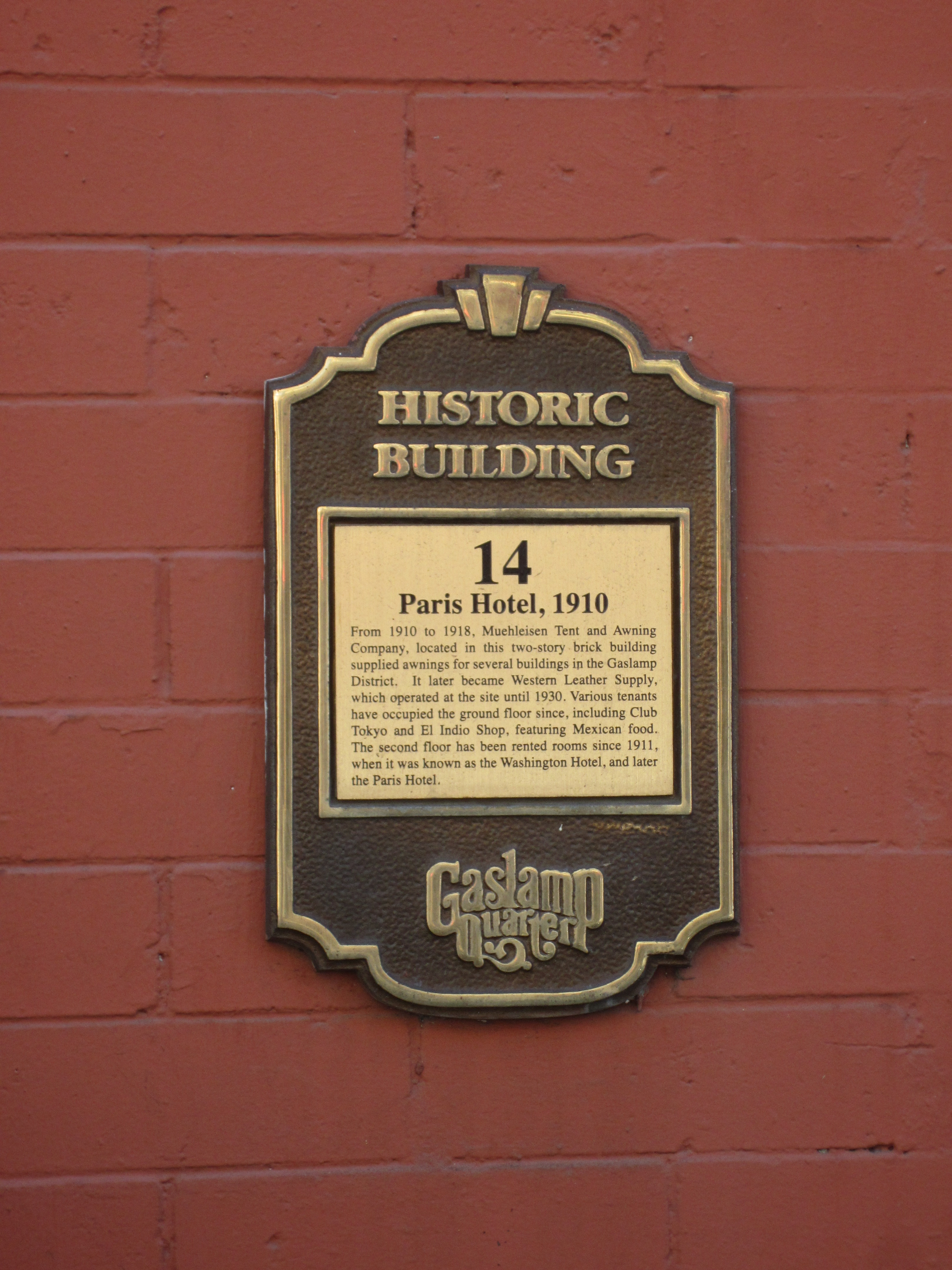
Plaque for the building, 2016

== See also ==
- List of Gaslamp Quarter historic buildings
