= Freddie (What We Do in the Shadows) =

- What We Do in the Shadows episode
- Episode no.: Season 4 Episode 9
- Directed by: DJ Stipsen
- Written by: Jake Bender; Zach Dunn
- Cinematography by: Michael Storey
- Editing by: Thomas Calderón; Liza Cardinale
- Production code: XWS04008
- Original air date: August 30, 2022
- Running time: 25 minutes

Guest appearances
- Sofia Coppola as herself; Jim Jarmusch as himself; Thomas Mars as himself; Kristen Schaal as The Guide; Anoop Desai as The Djinn; Parisa Fakhri as Marwa; Al Roberts as Freddie

Episode chronology
← Previous "Go Flip Yourself"	Next → "Sunrise, Sunset"

"Freddie" is the ninth episode of the fourth season of the American mockumentary comedy horror television series What We Do in the Shadows, set in the franchise of the same name. It is the 39th overall episode of the series and was written by co-producers Jake Bender and Zach Dunn, and directed by DJ Stipsen. It was released on FX on August 30, 2022.

The series is set in Staten Island, New York City. Like the 2014 film, the series follows the lives of vampires in the city. These consist of three vampires, Nandor, Laszlo, and Nadja. They live alongside Colin Robinson, an energy vampire; and Guillermo, Nandor's familiar. The series explores the absurdity and misfortunes experienced by the vampires. In the episode, Guillermo's boyfriend visits, while Laszlo decides to take Baby Colin out of the nightclub for a tour.

According to Nielsen Media Research, the episode was seen by an estimated 0.356 million household viewers and gained a 0.13 ratings share among adults aged 18–49. The episode received extremely positive reviews from critics, who praised the humor, performances and character development.

== Plot ==
The nightclub has proved to be a success, even attracting human celebrities like Sofia Coppola, Thomas Mars and Jim Jarmusch. When Coppola and Mars ask Nadja (Natasia Demetriou) for the "celebrity special", they are killed by vampires, while Jarmusch believes it to be a work of special effects.

Guillermo (Harvey Guillén) reveals that he started a relationship with a man named Freddie (Al Roberts) during his time in England, and Freddie is coming over to visit. Nandor (Kayvan Novak) meets Freddie and develops a crush on him, just as his relationship with Marwa (Parisa Fakhri) has grown stale. Unwilling to steal Freddie from Guillermo, Nandor uses his first wish from the mini lamp to transform Marwa in an exact copy of Freddie. Both couples then spend their day walking through New York, unaware of each other. At the nightclub, Laszlo (Matt Berry) presents Nadja with a new contract, which she must sign if she wants to keep Baby Colin (Mark Proksch) playing. When she refuses to the new terms, Nandor decides to take Baby Colin with him on a new tour. After failing to find a replacement, Nadja settles for hiring "Le Cirque Erotique" for a performance. Baby Colin's tour begins in Binghamton, but things go awry when he grows into puberty overnight, and he is booed for his poor performance.

For the nightclub, a cirque performer performs autofellatio, which impresses the crowd. However, the crowd gets disappointed when the act lasts just a few seconds. Realizing that Baby Colin was the biggest reason for the nightclub's success, Nadja admits their glory days are behind them. Guillermo discovers Nando and Marwa-Freddie, which is also witnessed by the real Freddie. Both Freddies are horrified, so Nandor uses hypnosis to calm them down. Nevertheless, Guillermo confronts Nandor for his actions, saying he had to make it about himself when Guillermo just wanted to spend time with his boyfriend. The next day, the real Freddie leaves for England, and Guillermo is forced to live with Nandor and Marwa-Freddie. Realizing his mistake, Nandor sends Marwa-Freddie off on a train to travel the world. Guillermo visits Freddie in London, but is heartbroken to discover that Freddie is now in a relationship with Marwa-Freddie.

== Production ==
=== Development ===
In August 2022, FX confirmed that the ninth episode of the season would be titled "Freddie", and that it would be written by co-producers Jake Bender and Zach Dunn, and directed by DJ Stipsen. This was Bender's third writing credit, Dunn's third writing credit, and Stipsen's first directing credit.

== Reception ==
=== Viewers ===
In its original American broadcast, "Freddie" was seen by an estimated 0.356 million household viewers with a 0.13 in the 18-49 demographics. This means that 0.09 percent of all households with televisions watched the episode. This was a 24% increase in viewership from the previous episode, which was watched by 0.287 million household viewers with a 0.09 in the 18-49 demographics.

=== Critical reviews ===
"Freddie" received extremely positive reviews from critics. William Hughes of The A.V. Club gave the episode a "B+" grade and wrote, "Lots of shows, after all, have had one of their characters, irritated at the spotlight being stolen from them, decide to have sex with their friend's new significant other. Very few of them have had that character instead opt to spend one of the three wishes he got as a wedding present from a djinn to turn his wife into an exact copy of said significant other, then have sex with them instead. But such is the magic of 'Freddie,' an episode of our favorite vamp-based televised sitcom in which heartbreak runs rampant and where everything truly magical never seems to last quite as long as you might like."

Katie Rife of Vulture gave the episode a 4 star rating out of 5 and wrote, "Although both Matt Berry and Kayvan Novak both had some commendable line readings, Natasia Demetriou easily walks away with this week's performance award. Her blood-drunk Nadja was full of hilarious details: the blood smeared all over her mouth; the sleepy, half-closed eyes; the outbursts, the slumped posture, the pratfalls; calling herself 'Mama.' But the best part, in my humble opinion, was her pronunciation of 'Sofia Cappabala.'" Tony Sokol of Den of Geek gave the episode a 4 star rating out of 5 and wrote, "'Freddie' separates the cast for a deeper character dive into all the players and ultimately supplies a final impossible curve which supplies both the complexity and absurdity. What We Do in the Shadows feeds on itself for laughs and has little mercy for its own characters. The episode leaves gaping wounds screaming for salt."

Melody McCune of Telltale TV gave the episode a 4 star rating out of 5 and wrote, "Overall, 'Freddie' is a solid outing for What We Do in the Shadows, brimming with humor, heartbreak, and plenty of bloody good fun. It aptly sets the stage for next week's season finale. Here's hoping teenage Colin Robinson won't dance on it." Alejandra Bodden of Bleeding Cool gave the episode a 9 out of 10 rating and wrote, "This week's episode of FX's What We Do in the Shadows, 'Freddie' was a big bowl of 'WTFs?' and 'no ways' that hit us right on the lines-crossed feels. Yet again, the show raises the bar and, yet again, another great episode to add to what has been thus far a wonderfully written season."
