= The George Washington Hotel (Winchester, Virginia) =

Historic hotel in Virginia, US

- U.S. National Register of Historic Places
- Virginia Landmarks Register
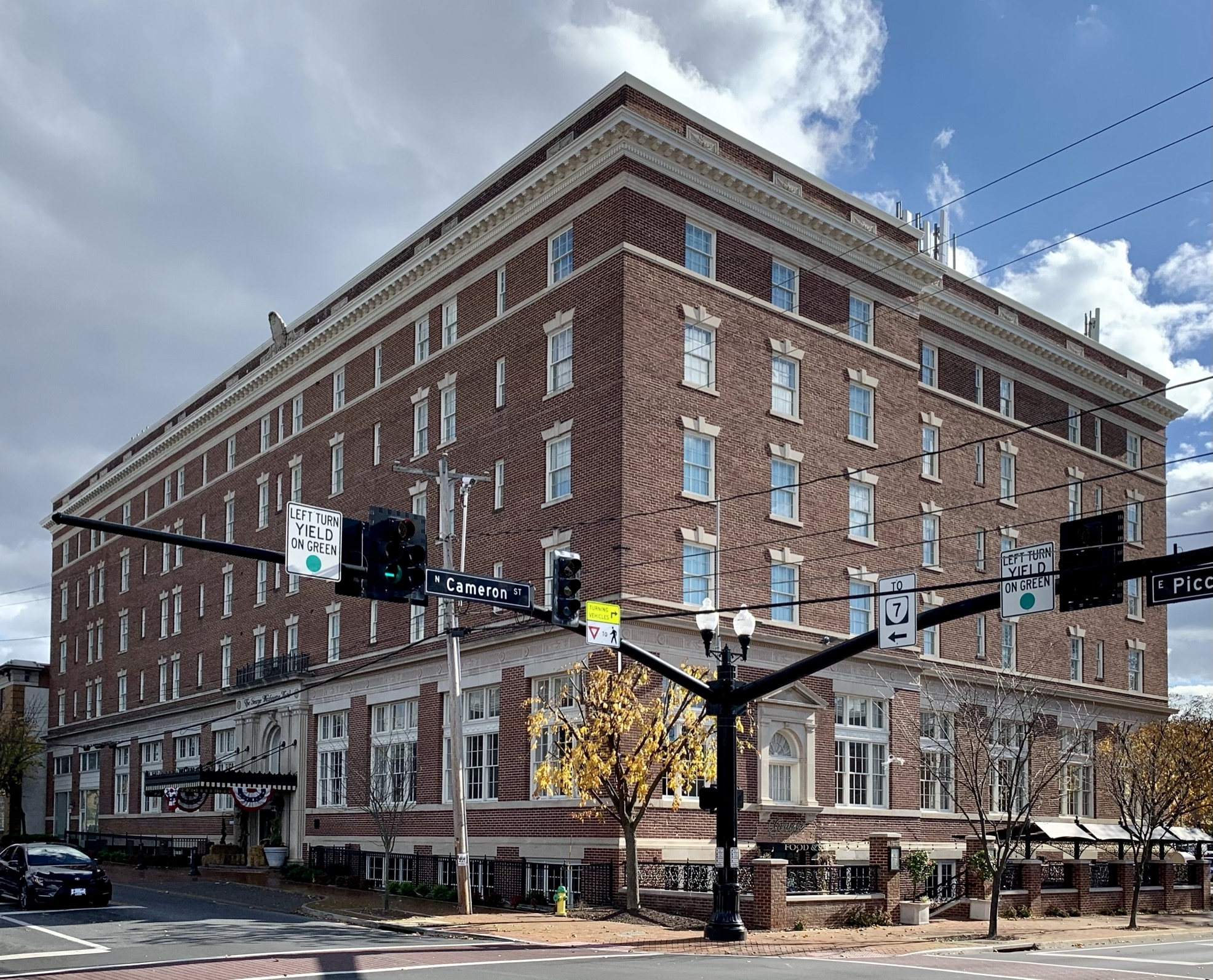
- The George Washington Hotel, Winchester, Virginia

- Location within Virginia Location within the United States
- Location: 103 E. Piccadilly Street, Winchester, Virginia
- Coordinates: 39°11′8.5″N 78°9′46.9″W
- Built: 1924, 1929, 1950/1951
- Architect: Clarence L. Harding; Marcellus Wright
- Architectural style: Colonial Revival, Classical Revival
- NRHP reference No.: 10000383
- VLR No.: 138-0042-0919

Significant dates
- Added to NRHP: June 24, 2010
- Designated VLR: March 18, 2010

The George Washington Hotel is a historic hotel located in downtown Winchester, Virginia. It was built in 1924 by The American Hotel Corporation, as part of their "Colonial Chain" of hotels. Like many hotels of the era, the property was built in close proximity of a B&O train station and was constructed to provide lodging to railroad passengers.

== History ==
=== Early years ===
Opened in 1924, the five-story hotel was originally built in the shape of an "L", with a rear one-story kitchen wing. It contained 102 rooms and 45 baths. The lowest level contained a barber-shop, cafeteria, candy shop and men's furnishing shop. In 1929, an additional wing was added to the hotel, providing 50 more guestrooms and giving the structure the shape of a "U". In 1950 the hotel was remodeled to include a Howard Johnson's restaurant. The George Washington was the headquarters of the Shenandoah Apple Blossom Festival. Notable guests include Lucille Ball, Jack Dempsey among many others.

=== Decline ===
With the construction of interstate highways and the dominance of cars, railroad travel began to decline. This contributed to the closure of the hotel in 1978. It operated as a retirement home - The George Washington Home for Adults - from 1978 to 1993. The property then remained vacant for eleven years.

=== Restoration ===
In 2004, the George Washington was purchased and restored, reopening in April 2008. It was listed on the National Register of Historic Places in 2010. It has 90 guestrooms, an indoor pool and hot tub, fitness room, restaurant Uno Pizzeria & Grill. It also has a cocktail lounge The Half Note Lounge. The hotel is managed by Wyndham Hotels as The George Washington – A Wyndham Grand Hotel.
