= Washington Hotel =

Washington Hotel or Hotel Washington may refer to:

- Hotel Washington (Chehalis, Washington)
- Washington Hotel (Greenfield, Missouri)
- Hotel Washington (Indianapolis, Indiana)
- Hotel Washington (Madison, Wisconsin)
- Hotel Washington (Washington, D.C.)

== See also ==
- George Washington Hotel (disambiguation)
- Mount Washington Hotel, Bretton Woods, New Hampshire
- Paris Hotel (San Diego), formerly Washington Hotel
