= WBNW-FM =

Coordinates: 42.138°N 75.999°W

- Endicott, New York; United States
- Broadcast area: Greater Binghamton
- Frequency: 105.7 MHz
- Branding: NOW 105.7

Programming
- Format: Top 40/CHR
- Affiliations: Premiere Networks

Ownership
- Owner: iHeartMedia; (iHM Licenses, LLC)
- Sister stations: WENE; WBBI; WINR; WKGB-FM; WMXW

History
- First air date: 1969
- Former call signs: WMRV (1969–1991); WMRV-FM (1991–2013)
- Call sign meaning: "Binghamton Now"

Technical information
- Licensing authority: FCC
- Facility ID: 19626
- Class: B
- ERP: 35,000 watts
- HAAT: 174 meters (571 ft)

Links
- Public license information: Public file; LMS
- Webcast: Listen live (via iHeartRadio)
- Website: radionow1057.iheart.com

WBNW-FM (105.7 MHz) -- branded "Now 105-7" -- is a commercial radio station in Binghamton, New York. The station airs a Top 40-CHR radio format and is owned by iHeartMedia, Inc. On weekdays, it carries several nationally syndicated programs including Elvis Duran and the Morning Show in AM drive time and On Air with Ryan Seacrest in middays. WBNW-FM is the primary entry point of the Emergency Alert System in Central New York. The studios and offices are on North Jensen Road in Vestal.

WBNW-FM is a Class B FM station. It has an effective radiated power (ERP) of 35,000 watts. The transmitter and tower are on Robinson Hill Road in Endwell.

== History ==
The station signed on the air in 1969. It began on 105.5 MHz and was only powered at 3,000 watts, a fraction of its current output. The original call sign was WMRV. Those call letters were chosen for TV entertainer and game show creator Merv Griffin, who owned it and its sister station, WENE (1430 AM). After Merv Griffin's radio group was split as part of his 1976 divorce from Julann Griffin, she acquired ownership of WMRV and WENE, along with New Jersey radio stations WMID in Atlantic City and WGRF in Pleasantville.

WMRV-FM became known as "Star 105.7" in the 1990s when it had the highest ratings to date. In 2000, it was acquired by San Antonio-based Clear Channel Communications.

WMRV-FM was a Top 40/CHR station from its beginning until it flipped to a hot adult contemporary format in 2004, where it stayed for eight years. It returned to playing Top 40/CHR hits in April 2012. On March 11, 2013, the station rebranded as "Now 105.7" and changed its call sign to WBNW-FM. The station remained a Top 40 station. Clear Channel Communications changed its name to iHeartMedia in 2014.
