= WMXW =

FM radio station serving the Binghamton, NY area

- Vestal, New York; United States
- Broadcast area: Binghamton metropolitan area; Southern Tier
- Frequency: 103.3 MHz
- Branding: Mix 103.3

Programming
- Format: Adult contemporary
- Affiliations: Premiere Networks

Ownership
- Owner: iHeartMedia, Inc.; (iHM Licenses, LLC)
- Sister stations: WBBI, WBNW-FM, WENE, WKGB-FM, WINR

History
- First air date: June 2, 1989

Technical information
- Licensing authority: FCC
- Facility ID: 19624
- Class: A
- ERP: 520 watts
- HAAT: 335.0 meters (1,099.1 ft)
- Transmitter coordinates: 42°03′40″N 75°56′45″W

Links
- Public license information: Public file; LMS
- Webcast: Listen live (via iHeartRadio)
- Website: mix1033fm.iheart.com

WMXW (103.3 FM) is a commercial radio station licensed to Vestal, New York, United States, serving the Binghamton metropolitan area with an adult contemporary format, known as "Mix 103.3". It is owned by iHeartMedia, with studios on North Jensen Road in Vestal.

The transmitter is off Ingraham Hill Road in Binghamton.

== History ==
The station signed on the air on June 2, 1989. From its start, it was an AC station, but at first it played soft adult contemporary music. It was owned by local business people.

In 1997, it was bought by Majac of Michigan, Inc. Majac kept the AC format. In 2000, it was acquired by Clear Channel Communications, which also left its AC format in place. Clear Channel in 2014 became iHeartMedia, the current owner.
