= Washingtonian Hall =

Historic house in New York, United States

- U.S. National Register of Historic Places
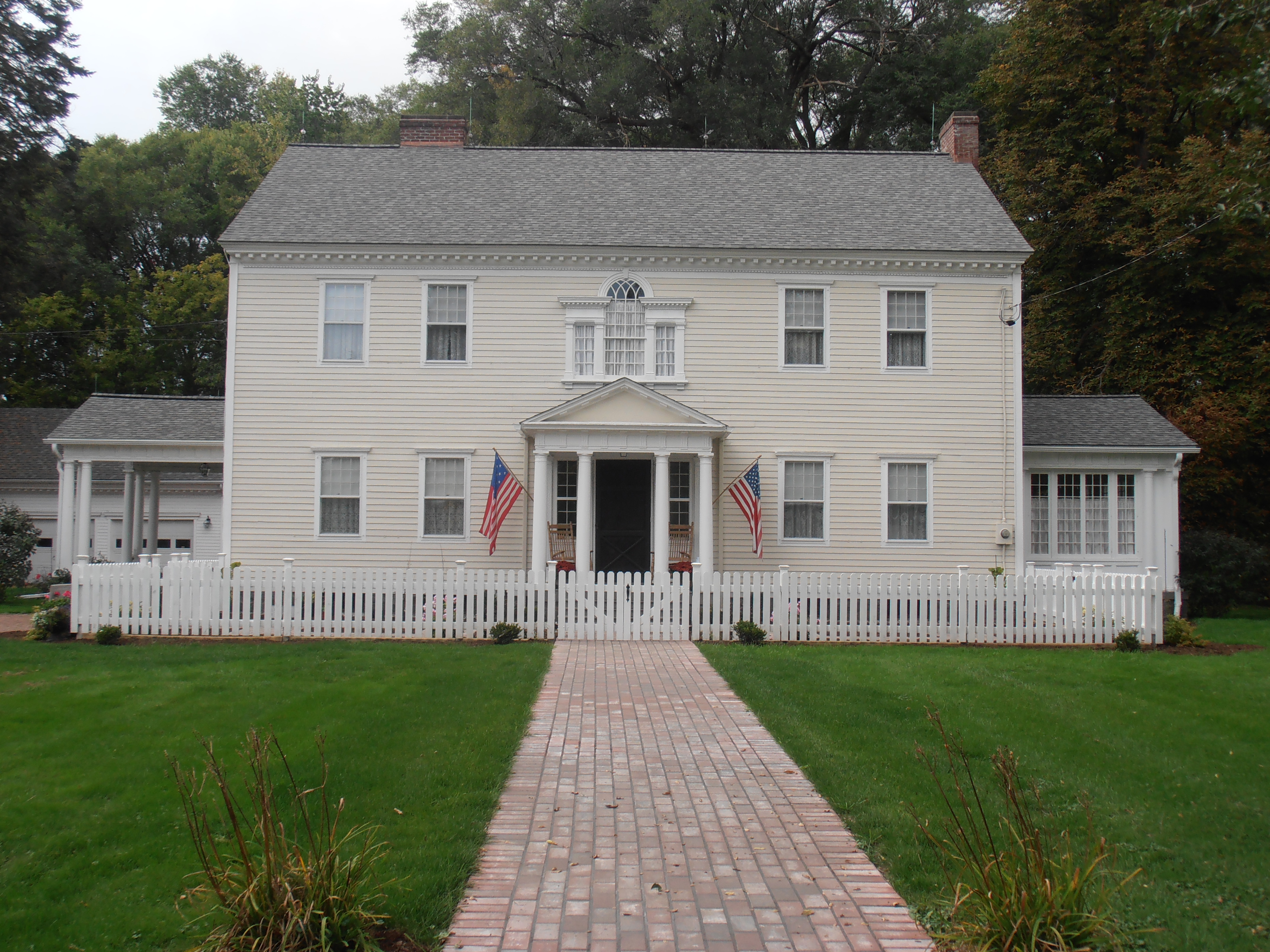
- Washingtonian Hall in 2013

- Location within New York Location within the United States
- Location: 3725 River Rd., Endwell, New York
- Coordinates: 42°6′39″N 76°0′16″W
- Area: 1 acre (0.40 ha)
- Built: 1799-1800
- Architectural style: Colonial Revival, Federal
- NRHP reference No.: 96000134
- Added to NRHP: February 23, 1996

Washingtonian Hall, also known as Amos Patterson House, is a historic home located in Endwell in Broome County, New York. It is a two-story, five-bay, center entrance, frame Federal style house built in 1799–1800. It was moved a short distance from its original site in 1924 and subsequently remodeled in the Colonial Revival style. Also on the property are contributing structures dating to the mid-1920s including a brick driveway, garden house and pergola. A 1920s carriage barn, horse barn, and picket fence were torn down after suffering severe damage in the 2006 flooding, however historic trim and lightning rods from the carriage house were reclaimed and installed on a new garage built in 2009.

Washingtonian Hall is 4800 square feet with 20 rooms and 4 fireplaces. It overlooks the Susquehanna river. There have been several additions and renovations over the years which retained the federal period architecture, moldings, and Palladian windows. Steam heat and electricity were added in 1924–25. Amos and Ann Patterson purchased 600 acres of land as a part of the Boston Ten Townships for the location of their farm and Washingtonian Hall.

Washingtonian Hall was listed on the National Register of Historic Places in 1996. The Patterson Hooper family cemetery is also on the National Register.

Below are two recent and two historic pictures of Washingtonian Hall, plus a picture of the Patterson Hooper family cemetery.

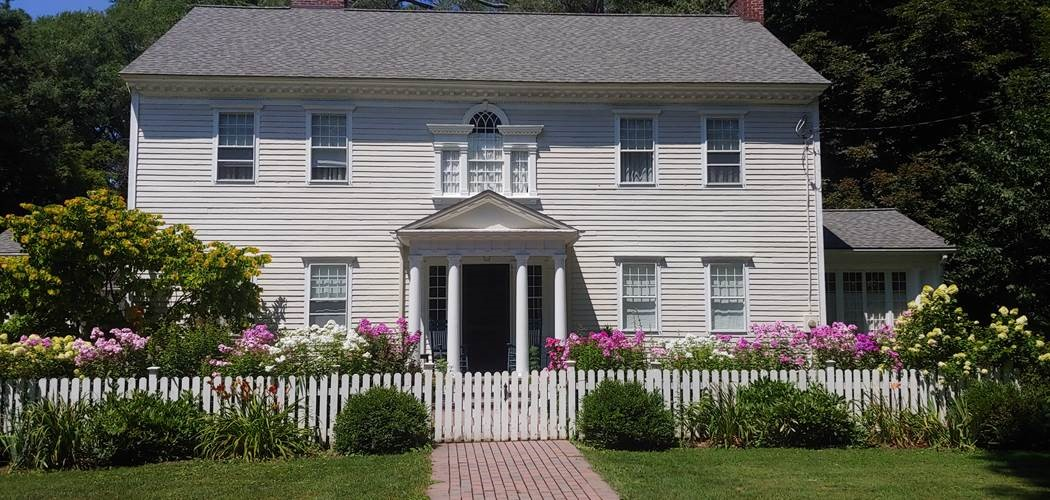
Washingtonian Hall's flower gardens are lovely in the summertime

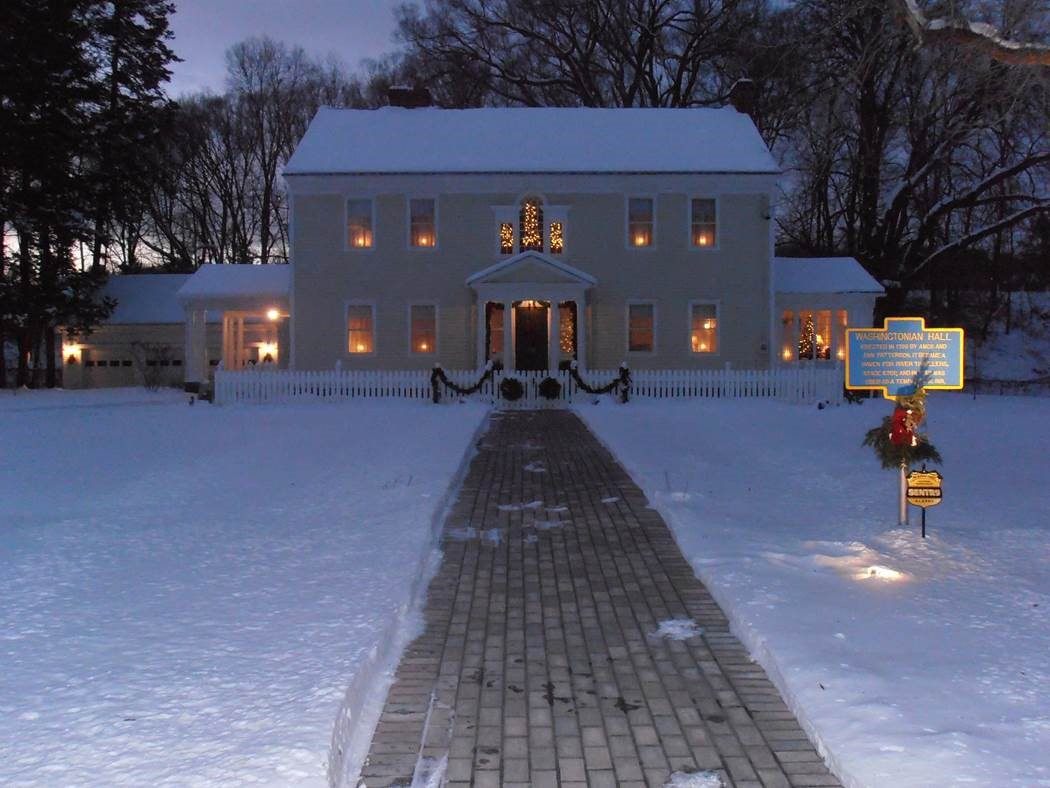
Winter season is also beautiful at Washingtonian Hall, especially around the holiday season

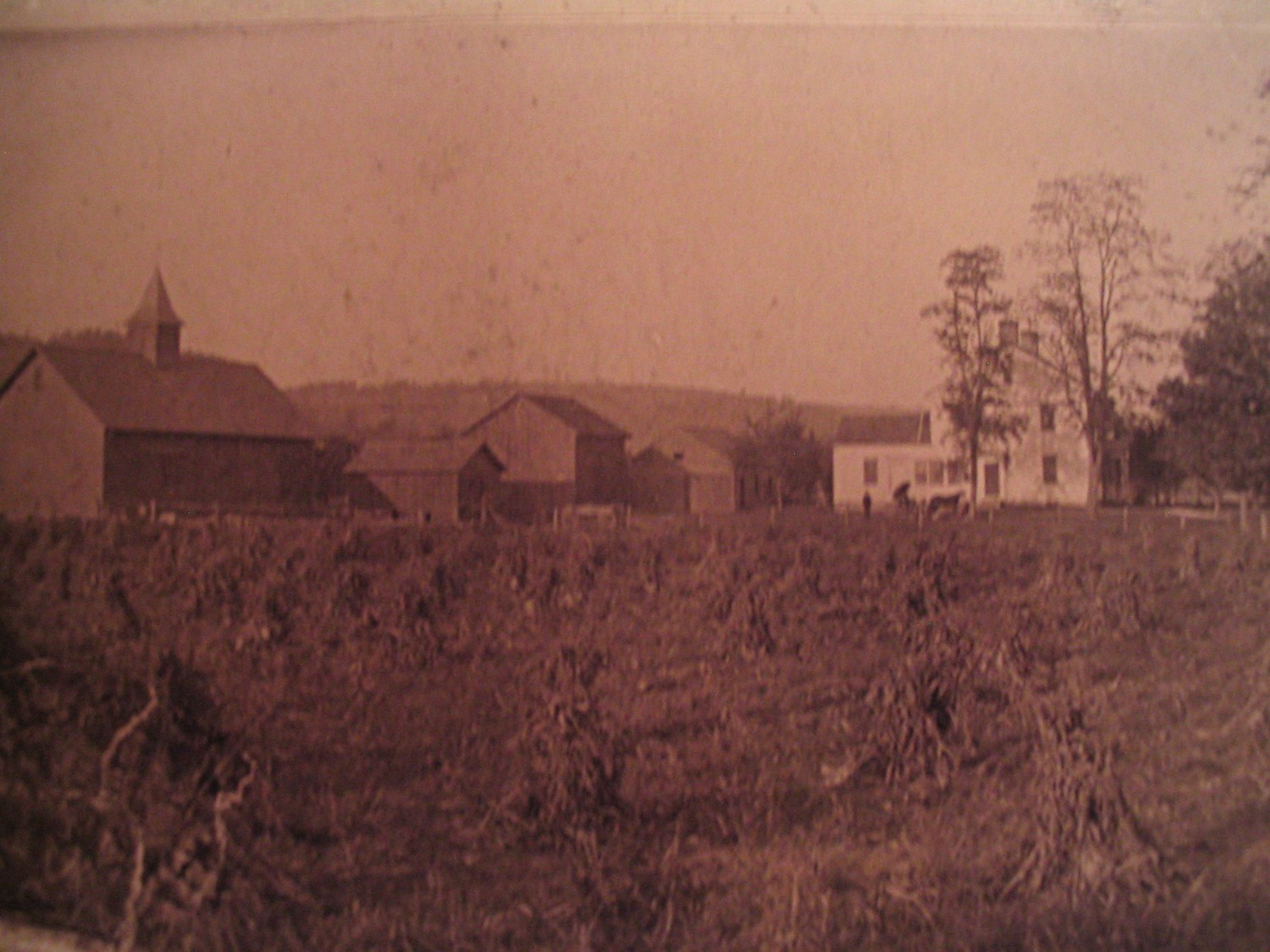
This is the earliest picture of the Amos and Ann Paterson Washingtonian Hall farm

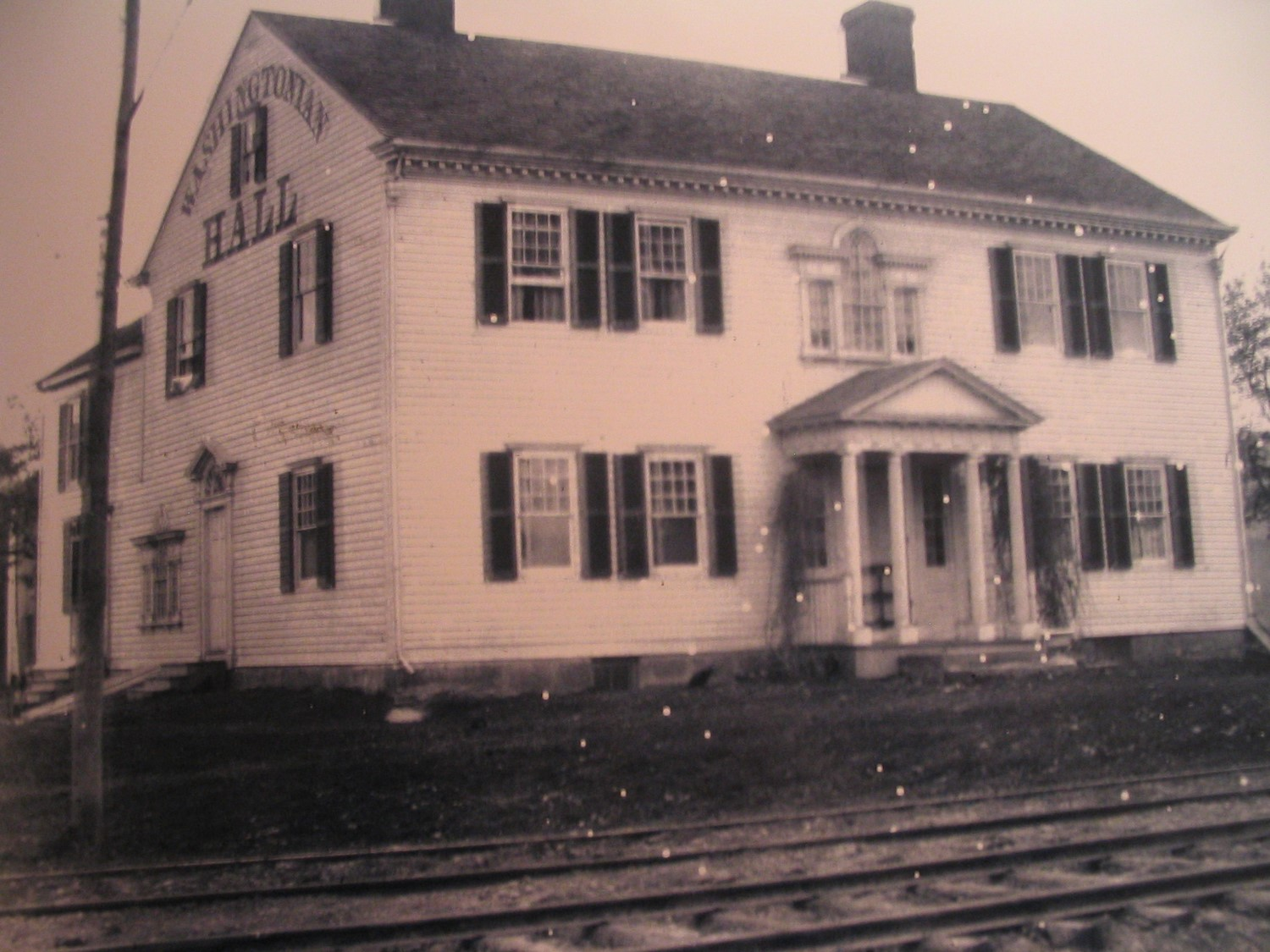
Washingtonian Hall was used as a meeting place for the temperance movement

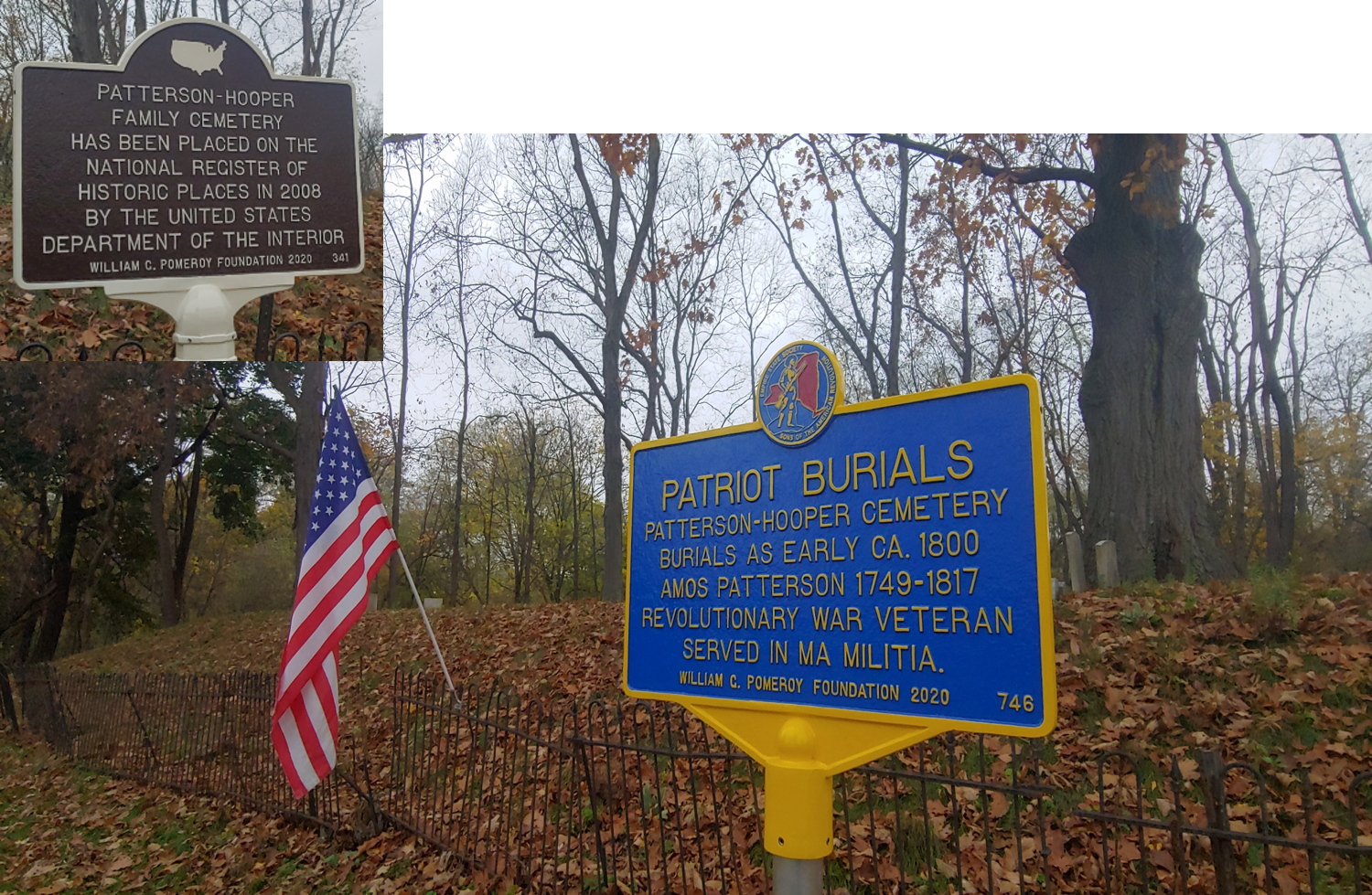
The Patterson Hooper Family Cemetery is where Amos and Ann Patterson are buried. The historic markers were installed in 2020.
