= WKGB-FM =

Conklin, New York; United States
- Broadcast area: Greater Binghamton
- Frequency: 92.5 MHz
- Branding: 92.5 KGB

Programming
- Format: Active rock

Ownership
- Owner: iHeartMedia; (iHM Licenses, LLC)
- Sister stations: WBBI, WBNW-FM, WENE, WINR, WMXW

History
- First air date: February 11, 1989
- Call sign meaning: East Coast variant of KGB-FM

Technical information
- Licensing authority: FCC
- Facility ID: 34451
- Class: A
- ERP: 1,450 watts
- HAAT: 206 meters (676 ft)
- Transmitter coordinates: 42°6′48.3″N 75°51′7.7″W

Links
- Public license information: Public file; LMS
- Webcast: Listen live (via iHeartRadio)
- Website: 925kgb.iheart.com

WKGB-FM (92.5 FM) is a commercial radio station licensed to Conklin, New York, United States, and serving Greater Binghamton. Owned by iHeartMedia, Inc., it airs an active rock format branded as "92.5 KGB". The studios are on North Jensen Road in Vestal.

WKGB-FM's transmitter is off Windy Hill Road in Binghamton, about 4 miles (6.4 km) east of downtown. In addition to a standard analog transmission, WKGB-FM is available online via iHeartRadio.

== History ==
WKGB-FM signed on the air on February 11, 1989. At the time, the station aired an album-oriented rock (AOR) format. WKGB-FM took its call letters from legendary West Coast rock station KGB-FM San Diego. After several decades, WKGB-FM and KGB-FM became sister stations, both owned by iHeartMedia.

In 2000, WKGB-FM was acquired by Clear Channel Communications. Clear Channel changed its name to iHeartMedia in 2014. For several years, WKGB-FM carried Sixx Sense with Nikki Sixx a weeknight national radio show featuring the music of Mötley Crüe and other active rock and heavy metal music artists. It was discontinued at the end of 2017.

== Programming ==
WKGB-FM carries the nationally syndicated program Rover's Morning Glory in AM drive time. Most of the other DJs voice-track their shows from iHeart stations in other cities.
