= WENE =

- Endicott, New York; United States
- Broadcast area: Binghamton, New York
- Frequency: 1430 kHz
- Branding: Fox Sports 1430

Programming
- Format: Sports
- Affiliations: Fox Sports Radio; Premiere Radio Networks; Westwood One; Buffalo Bills Radio Network

Ownership
- Owner: iHeartMedia; (iHM Licenses, LLC)
- Sister stations: WBBI; WBNW-FM; WINR; WKGB-FM; WMXW

History
- First air date: 1947
- Former call signs: WENE (1947–1991); WMRV (1991–1994)

Technical information
- Licensing authority: FCC
- Facility ID: 19625
- Class: B
- Power: 5,000 watts
- Transmitter coordinates: 42°4′56.3″N 76°1′51.7″W

Links
- Public license information: Public file; LMS
- Webcast: Listen live (via iHeartRadio)
- Website: foxsports1430.iheart.com

WENE (1430 AM) is a radio station broadcasting a sports format. Licensed to Endicott, New York, United States, the station serves the Binghamton market. The station is owned and operated by iHeartMedia and features programming from Premiere Radio Networks, Westwood One and Fox Sports Radio.

During its top 40/rock heyday, from the early 1960s through 1975, WENE, under the ownership of Merv Griffin's January Enterprises, was home to many nationally famous talent such as Johnny Donovan, Greaseman, Bob Savage, Dave "Roe" Mason, Ray Ross, Michael J. Raymond, Charlie Burger and Fred "Bumper Morgan" Merrin. After Merv Griffin's radio group was split as part of his 1976 divorce from Julann Griffin, she acquired ownership of WENE and FM sister station WMRV, along with New Jersey radio stations WMID in Atlantic City and WGRF in Pleasantville.
