= George Washington House (Bladensburg, Maryland) =

- U.S. National Register of Historic Places
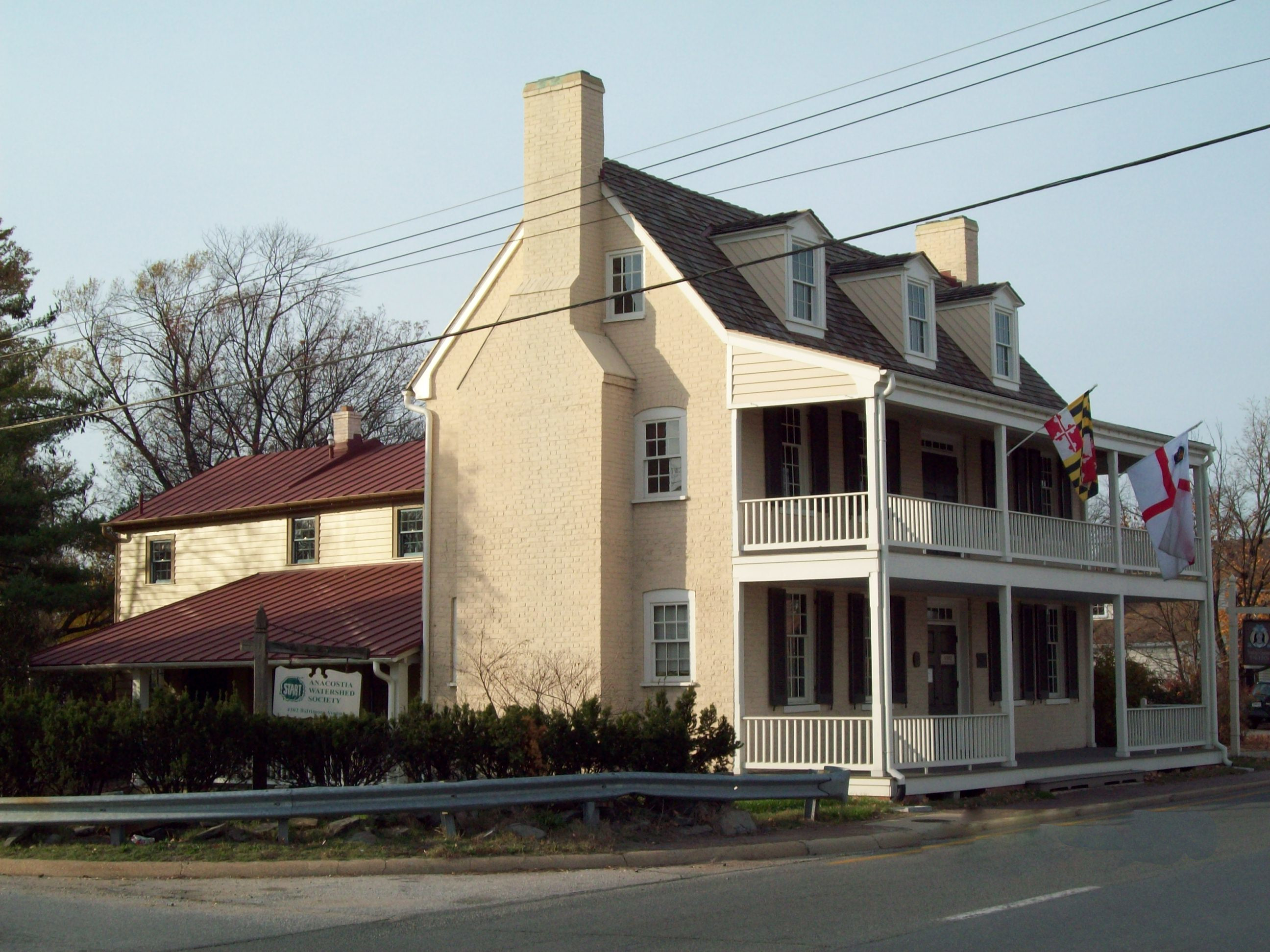
- George Washington House, November 2008

- Location within Maryland Location within the United States
- Location: Baltimore Ave at Upshur St; Bladensburg, Maryland; U.S.
- Coordinates: 38°56′28″N 76°56′29″W
- Area: < 1 acre (0.40 ha)
- Built: 1755
- NRHP reference No.: 74002198
- Added to NRHP: August 7, 1974

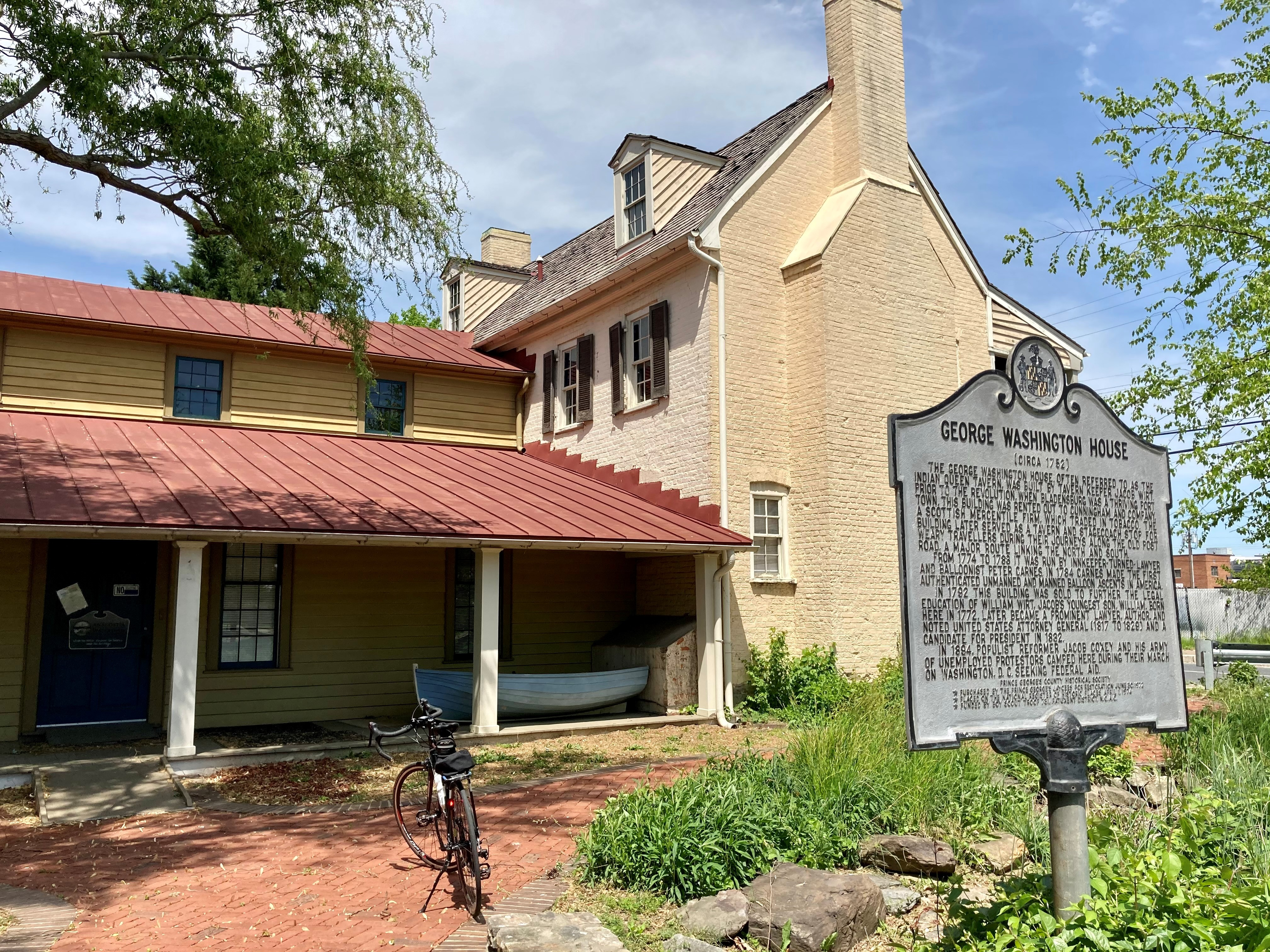
Indian Queen Tavern, May 2021

The George Washington House, or Indian Queen Tavern, is located at Baltimore Avenue, at Upshur Street, in Bladensburg, Prince George's County, Maryland. It was constructed in the 1760s. The 2 1/2-story structure is constructed of brick Flemish bond on ends. The plan is rectangular, with a gabled roof, exterior end chimneys, gabled shingled dormers. There are first and second-story center entrances, each with a transom. There is a full-width one-story porch with balustraded deck and side entrances. The structure includes a later two-story rear addition. The structure is Georgian.

It represents the last remnant of a social and commercial complex established in the 1760s by Jacob Wirt, whose son William Wirt later became U.S. Attorney General and an 1832 presidential candidate.

Pioneering balloonist Peter Carnes ran an inn on the premises between 1774 and 1783. His initial tests of a hot air balloon took place near the inn, and led up to the first successful American balloon flights in Philadelphia, on July 19, 1784.

The Indian Queen Tavern gained its reputation as the "George Washington House" through an assumption that "George Washington slept here." Research in primary sources has shown that the extant structure was never a tavern during Washington's lifetime, although it is possible that he stayed in the frame Indian Queen Tavern formerly located next to the present structure. The brick tavern began to be known as the "George Washington House" before 1878 when it was being used as a hotel. The structure also housed Jacob Coxey's "army" of unemployed during an 1894 march on Washington, D.C. to demand relief. It now serves as headquarters for the Anacostia Watershed Society.

It was listed on the National Register of Historic Places in 1974.

== Legacy ==
Innkeeper/balloonist Peter Carnes fled town with his wife after his brother-in-law sued him for back rent on the Indian Queen. Carnes had been working as a bartender at the tavern when the owner, Jacob Wirt, died. Carnes took over the tavern and married the owner's widow, but a local judge ruled that this did not exempt him from paying rent. Carnes moved to Augusta, Georgia, where he became an attorney, and was part of the group that welcomed George Washington to the city in 1791.

A local bar in Augusta, the Indian Queen, is named in Carnes' honor, and seeks to duplicate the atmosphere of his tavern.
