= Endwell, New York =

- Census-designated place
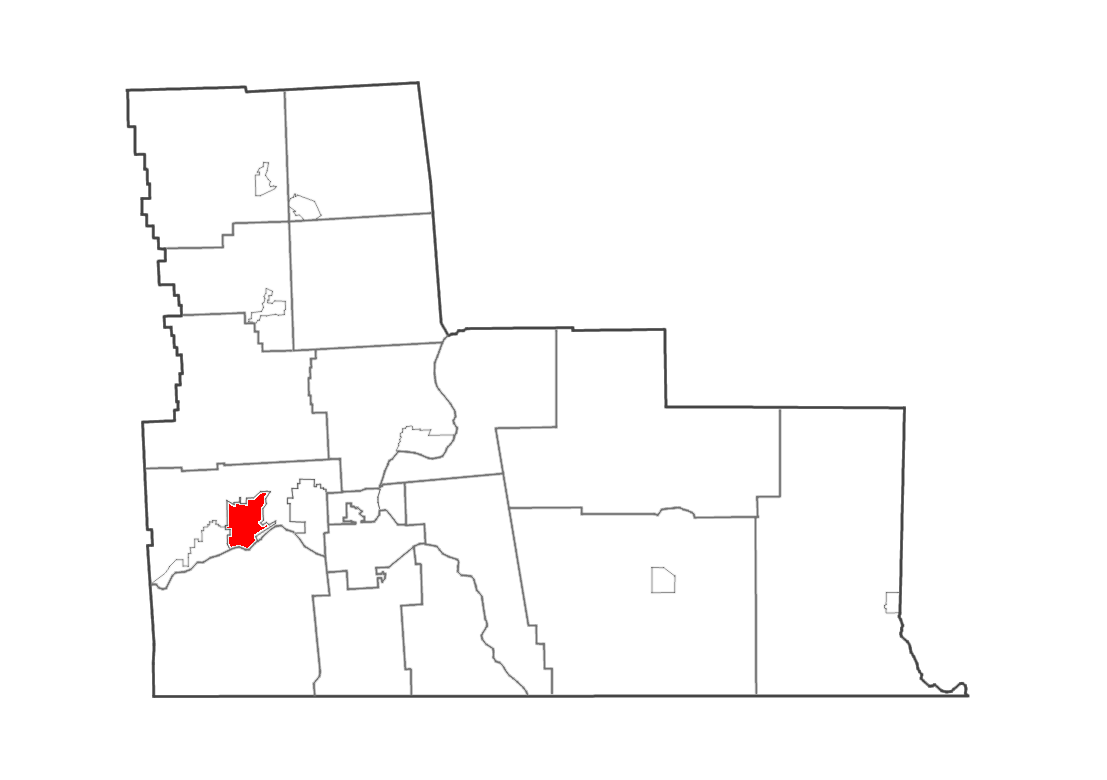
- Map highlighting Endwell's location within Broome County.

- Location within the state of New York
- Coordinates: 42°6′54″N 76°1′34″W
- Country: United States
- State: New York
- County: Broome
- Town: Union

Area
  - Total: 3.78 sq mi (9.78 km^{2})
  - Land: 3.75 sq mi (9.70 km^{2})
  - Water: 0.031 sq mi (0.08 km^{2})
- Elevation: 846 ft (258 m)

Population (2020)
  - Total: 11,762
  - Density: 3,141.8/sq mi (1,213.06/km^{2})
- Time zone: UTC-5 (EST)
  - Summer (DST): UTC-4 (EDT)
- ZIP codes: 13760, 13762
- Area code: 607
- FIPS code: 36-24526
- GNIS feature ID: 0949658

Endwell is a hamlet (and census-designated place) located in the town of Union in Broome County, New York, United States. As of the 2020 census, Endwell had a population of 11,762.

Endwell is situated between the villages of Endicott and Johnson City. It is west of Binghamton and is considered a suburb of that city.

Endwell is also the home of a popular local park, Highland Park, well known in the area for its annual Fourth of July fireworks display as well as its classic carousel. Although most children residing in Endwell that attend public schools are served through the Maine-Endwell School District, some attend the Union-Endicott School District.

== History ==
Endwell used to be known as Hooper, but the name had to be changed in 1921 because of post office regulations. There were too many locations in the state with the name Hooper. The most likely story, shared by an elderly man who attended the meeting to change the name: Endicott Johnson Corporation was producing a line of shoes called the "Endwell", named after H. Wendell Endicott of the Endicott Johnson Shoe Company. An advertisement for the shoes read, "Wear the Endwell shoes and your day will end well."

Hooper was part of the town of Union in Broome County and first appears on a map in the early 1850s as a depot of the newly constructed Erie Railroad at the intersection of what is now Hooper Road and the Norfolk Southern Railway. (The original site of Hooper is now underneath the overpass carrying Hooper Road over the railroad tracks and State Route 17C.) The main road along the north bank of the Susquehanna River, existing since colonial times and long before as an Indian trail, passed just to the south. It was common practice at the time to name depots for landowners who donated or leased land to the railroad to construct a depot, and this is where the name "Hooper" came from.

Up until 1890, the only settlements on the north side of the Susquehanna River between Binghamton and Owego were Hooper and Union (at the intersection of what is now Route 26N and Route 17C).

Several businesses were located near this commercial site from 1850 to 1950, including a creamery (dairy plant) reflecting the predominantly dairy-based economy in the immediate surrounding area at the time. A US post office named Hooper was established in one of the general stores near this site in 1853, and "Hooper" was the term commonly used for the unincorporated area of the town of Union between the villages of Johnson City and Endicott until "Endwell" was adopted in 1921. The Town Council of Union has been the local government of what is now Endwell since 1791, although over the years some functions have been taken over by Broome County (poor relief/social services) and by New York State (policing).

Hooper School (now demolished), located a quarter mile west of the depot on the north side of East Main Street, provided primary education (kindergarten-8th grade, K-6 after 1954) for area children from 1923 to 1971. A nationally recognized "state-of-the-art" school when it was built, Hooper School supplanted the railroad depot as the center of the community. Graduates of Hooper School who went on to what was then called "secondary" education attended Union-Endicott High School until the opening of Maine-Endwell Central High School in 1961. Other schools were located on this site dating back to 1876.

What is now Endwell was largely a rural area well into the 20th century. It was in fact a dense forest pierced by Patterson Creek, and the original industry in Endwell dating back to about 1800 was logging. Commercially valuable trees (predominantly oak) were cut down and dragged by oxen down to the Susquehanna. As the snow melted in the spring and the river rose to navigable depth, these logs were lashed together into rafts and floated down the river to Harrisburg, Pennsylvania, where they were broken up and sold as lumber. Permanent settlement began around 1820 along Patterson Creek which flowed into the Susquehanna and was attractive as a water supply and water power source for sawmills. By 1860 economic activity in the area was based on dairy farms along Hooper and Farm-to-Market Roads, second-growth logging, and the railroad depot.

At this time, the only roads in the area were Hooper, Farm-to-Market, Taft, Twist Run, and East Main (current names). The hilly terrain and relatively poor soil quality meant that only a pasture/livestock-based agriculture was viable, and the area was sparsely settled compared to other areas of Broome County. During the 1890s, significant commercial and residential development began along the East Main Street corridor (State Route 17C), including a horse-drawn streetcar line, which connected the growing villages of Johnson City and Endicott. These villages grew very rapidly between 1890 and 1920 because of the success of the Endicott Johnson Corporation, a shoe manufacturer. Wealthy residents of Binghamton in this horse-and-buggy era also maintained numerous weekend/summer homes in what is now Endwell.

The area was best known from the 1850s to the early 1900s for the Carmel Grove Campgrounds located about half a mile north of the depot on the east side of Hooper Road, near the intersection of what is now Country Club Road. Originally created by the Methodist Church close to the depot for the summer church meetings popular at the time, it soon became part of the Chautauqua movement, which appealed to a desire for self-improvement. For a nominal fee, subsidized by Reed Freeman, a wealthy Binghamton clothing manufacturer, the Chautauqua Assembly at Carmel Grove combined what we would call today a week-long "resort" experience with a stimulating series of lectures by nationally known figures of the time, along with popular musical and theater acts. Capable of accommodating a thousand guests in rows of cabins over the hillside, this was a popular summer vacation destination for residents of Binghamton, central New York, and northeastern Pennsylvania for many years.

Endwell appears as it does today because of the rapid growth of nearby Endicott-based International Business Machines (IBM), a computer manufacturer, during the 1940-1970 period. This created a demand for housing which quickly converted Endwell from a hamlet at the intersection of Hooper Road and State Route 17C into the large residential area it is today. The simultaneous increase in car ownership in the 1940s and 1950s made the development of Endwell possible. The area north of Watson Boulevard was developed during the 1940s and 1950s, and the area east of Hooper Road during the 1950s and 1960s. This growth, along with similar growth in the town of Maine to the immediate north, led to the creation of a new Maine-Endwell Central School District and the opening of Maine-Endwell Central High School in 1961. This school is now the center of the community, inheriting its role from Hooper School and the original Hooper railroad depot. The school was the 2008 New York State Class A High School baseball champions. Also is home to the 4-time state football champions, and 6 time ranked number one in New York Swim Team.

A few big names in sports have lived or were born here, including Mike Dunham (longtime NHL goalie, now goalie coach for the New York Islanders) and Isaiah Kacyvenski (starter for the Seattle Seahawks for 5 years-and was Special Teams captain for Seattle during their 2005 Super Bowl appearance). The high school girls field hockey team was ranked as high as 19th in the nation in 2007. Jennifer Radi is a world champion baton twirler, who won gold in Italy in 1996 and the World Open 1-baton championship for 11 consecutive years and the World Open 2-baton championship for nine years. Endwell is home to two well-known local golf courses, Endwell Greens and the Binghamton Country Club. It is also the hometown of the 2007 and 2015 New York State Little League Champions and the winners of the 2016 Little League World Series.

== Geography ==
Endwell is located at 42°6′54″N 76°1′34″W (42.114974, -76.025991).

According to the United States Census Bureau, the hamlet has a total area of 3.8 square miles (9.8 km^{2}), of which 3.7 square miles (9.7 km^{2}) is land and 0.039 square miles (0.1 km^{2}), or 0.85%, is water.

Endwell is on the north side of the Susquehanna River. New York State Route 17 and New York State Route 17C are east-west highways passing through the community.

The Highland Park Carousel was listed on the National Register of Historic Places in 1992. The Washingtonian Hall was listed in 1996 and the Patterson-Hooper Family Cemetery in 2008.

Endwell is protected by the New York State Police, Broome County Sheriff, Union Volunteer Emergency Squad and the Endwell Fire Department

== Demographics ==
Historical population
Census	Pop.	Note	%±
2020	11,762		—
U.S. Decennial Census

=== 2020 census ===
As of the 2020 census, Endwell had a population of 11,762. The median age was 43.9 years. 20.0% of residents were under the age of 18 and 22.6% of residents were 65 years of age or older. For every 100 females there were 93.5 males, and for every 100 females age 18 and over there were 90.6 males age 18 and over.

99.8% of residents lived in urban areas, while 0.2% lived in rural areas.

There were 5,226 households in Endwell, of which 24.6% had children under the age of 18 living in them. Of all households, 42.7% were married-couple households, 19.7% were households with a male householder and no spouse or partner present, and 30.0% were households with a female householder and no spouse or partner present. About 35.6% of all households were made up of individuals and 16.9% had someone living alone who was 65 years of age or older.

There were 5,615 housing units, of which 6.9% were vacant. The homeowner vacancy rate was 1.5% and the rental vacancy rate was 5.7%.

Racial composition as of the 2020 census
Race	Number	Percent
White	10,139	86.2%
Black or African American	454	3.9%
American Indian and Alaska Native	18	0.2%
Asian	283	2.4%
Native Hawaiian and Other Pacific Islander	8	0.1%
Some other race	160	1.4%
Two or more races	700	6.0%
Hispanic or Latino (of any race)	510	4.3%

=== 2000 census ===
As of the 2000 census, there were 11,706 people, 5,187 households, and 3,340 families residing in the community. The population density was 3,179.4 inhabitants per square mile (1,227.6/km^{2}). There were 5,414 housing units at an average density of 1,470.5 per square mile (567.8/km^{2}). The racial makeup of the CDP was 95.48% White, 1.32% African American, 0.09% Native American, 1.72% Asian, 0.01% Pacific Islander, 0.47% from other races, and 0.91% from two or more races. Hispanic or Latino of any race were 1.27% of the population.

There were 5,187 households, out of which 25.4% had children under the age of 18 living with them, 52.9% were married couples living together, 8.9% had a female householder with no husband present, and 35.6% were non-families. Thirty-one-point-one percent of all households were made up of individuals, and 14.5% had someone living alone who was 65 years of age or older. The average household size was 2.25 and the average family size was 2.83.

In the community, the population was spread out, with 21.0% under the age of 18, 6.1% from 18 to 24, 26.7% from 25 to 44, 24.6% from 45 to 64, and 21.5% who were 65 years of age or older. The median age was 42 years. For every 100 females, there were 90.3 males. For every 100 females age 18 and over, there were 86.8 males.

The median income for a household in the community was $41,212, and the median income for a family was $51,881. Males had a median income of $40,407 versus $25,516 for females. The per capita income for the CDP was $24,069. About 3.9% of families and 5.0% of the population were below the poverty line, including 6.1% of those under age 18 and 2.7% of those age 65 or over.

== Notable people ==
- Mike Dunham, former professional ice hockey goaltender predominantly associated with the Nashville Predators
- Megan Jacoby, Hyrox athlete and 2024 Hyrox
- Thomas Tull, billionaire businessman, entrepreneur, and film producer; former chairman and CEO at Legendary Entertainment
- John Ducey, American actor and screenwriter
