= City Council (What We Do in the Shadows) =

- What We Do in the Shadows episode
- Episode no.: Season 1 Episode 2
- Directed by: Jemaine Clement
- Written by: Paul Simms
- Cinematography by: DJ Stipsen
- Editing by: Shawn Paper; Yana Gorskaya
- Production code: XWS01002
- Original air date: April 3, 2019
- Running time: 24 minutes

Guest appearances
- Doug Jones as Baron Afaras; Beanie Feldstein as Jenna; Chris Perfetti as Kyle; Hayden Szeto as Jonathan; Marceline Hugot as Barbara Lazarro

Episode chronology
← Previous "Pilot"	Next → "Werewolf Feud"

"City Council" is the second episode of the first season of the American mockumentary comedy horror television series What We Do in the Shadows, set in the franchise of the same name. The episode was written by executive producer Paul Simms, and directed by series creator Jemaine Clement. It was released on FX on April 3, 2019.

The series is set in Staten Island, New York City. Like the 2014 film, the series follows the lives of vampires in the city. These consist of three vampires, Nandor, Laszlo, and Nadja. They live alongside Colin Robinson, an energy vampire; and Guillermo, Nandor's familiar. The series explores the absurdity and misfortunes experienced by the vampires. In the episode, the vampires visit the city council to let know their plans to take over Staten Island.

According to Nielsen Media Research, the episode was seen by an estimated 0.658 million household viewers and gained a 0.3 ratings share among adults aged 18–49, making it the most watched episode of the series. The episode received positive reviews from critics, who praised the scenes at the city council and humor, although Clement's directing received a mixed response.

== Plot ==
Guillermo (Harvey Guillén) leads the vampires to a group of virgins: a club of LARPers, which includes Jenna (Beanie Feldstein) and Jonathan (Hayden Szeto). The vampires leave, but Nadja (Natasia Demetriou) takes an interest in Jenna upon seeing her mistreatment by her colleagues.

With the Baron (Doug Jones) demanding them to conquer the New World, the vampires are confused over whether he meant Staten Island or North America. Unsure of their plan, Colin Robinson (Mark Proksch) suggests that they should visit the city council to make their plans known. Nandor (Kayvan Novak) uses his turn to threaten the council into submitting to their conquest, but is rebuffed as the council only attends zoning ordinances. Laszlo (Matt Berry) decides to stalk the borough president, Barbara Lazarro (Marceline Hugot), intending to have her surrender. Nandor meanwhile approaches Lazarro's opponent, Doug Peterson (Richie Moriarty), placing him under his command.

Nadja approaches Jenna at night, and upon thinking about it, turns her into a vampire. As a "gift" to Lazarro, Laszlo attracts and kills the raccoons that ate her garbage, putting them in front of her porch, shocking her. During the next council meeting where Lazarro shares her fears, Nandor commands Peterson to publicly threaten her life, causing him to get arrested by security. At her dorm room, Jenna's condition worsens as she excessively vomits.

== Production ==
=== Development ===
In March 2019, FX confirmed that the second episode of the season would be titled "City Council", and that it would be written by executive producer Paul Simms, and directed by series creator Jemaine Clement. This was Simms' first writing credit, and Clement's first directing credit.

== Reception ==
=== Viewers ===
In its original American broadcast, "City Council" was seen by an estimated 0.658 million household viewers with a 0.3 in the 18-49 demographics. This means that 0.3 percent of all households with televisions watched the episode. This was a 6% increase in viewership from the previous episode, which was watched by 0.617 million household viewers with a 0.2 in the 18-49 demographics.

With DVR factored in, the episode was watched by 1.26 million viewers with a 0.5 in the 18-49 demographics.

=== Critical reviews ===
"City Council" received positive reviews from critics. Katie Rife of The A.V. Club gave the episode a "B–" grade and wrote, "Compared to last week's series premiere, this episode was over before it really started. Jemaine Clement directs, and although the humor stays true to the ironic punchlines and absurd sight gags of previous What We Do In The Shadows installments, Clement's timing isn't quite as fine tuned as that of Taika Waititi, who directed the pilot. As a result, this second episode speeds by at a breakneck pace without taking the time to really let the jokes breathe."

Tony Sokol of Den of Geek gave the episode a 4 star rating out of 5 and wrote, "'City Council' continues to lampoon the vampire mythology and the subculture which rose out of it with toothy enthusiasm and sanguine satire."

Lisa Babick of TV Fanatic gave the episode a 4 star rating out of 5 and wrote, "On 'City Council', the vampires begin their attempt at world domination in the most ridiculous of ways, but it's not going as well as they expected. Well, actually, they think their plans are moving along brilliantly, but they're all too dumb to realize they are heading towards a big fail." Greg Wheeler of The Review Geek gave the episode a 4 star rating out of 5 and wrote, "While the episode doesn't quite hit the same lofty heights the first achieved, there's enough here to make for a thoroughly entertaining, enjoyable watch nonetheless. Quite where the show goes from here is anyone's guess but given what we've seen thus far, it's a ride well worth taking."
