= Manhattan Night Club =

- What We Do in the Shadows episode
- Episode no.: Season 1 Episode 4
- Directed by: Jemaine Clement
- Written by: Tom Scharpling
- Cinematography by: DJ Stipsen
- Editing by: Shawn Paper; Yana Gorskaya
- Production code: XWS01003
- Original air date: April 17, 2019
- Running time: 23 minutes

Guest appearances
- Beanie Feldstein as Jenna; Nick Kroll as Simon the Devious

Episode chronology
← Previous "Werewolf Feud"	Next → "Animal Control"

"Manhattan Night Club" is the fourth episode of the first season of the American mockumentary comedy horror television series What We Do in the Shadows, set in the franchise of the same name. The episode was written by co-executive producer Tom Scharpling, and directed by series creator Jemaine Clement. It was released on FX on April 17, 2019.

The series is set in Staten Island, New York City. Like the 2014 film, the series follows the lives of vampires in the city. These consist of three vampires, Nandor, Laszlo, and Nadja. They live alongside Colin Robinson, an energy vampire; and Guillermo, Nandor's familiar. The series explores the absurdity and misfortunes experienced by the vampires. In the episode, the vampires seek an alliance with Simon the Devious, leader of the vampires in Manhattan.

According to Nielsen Media Research, the episode was seen by an estimated 0.439 million household viewers and gained a 0.15 ratings share among adults aged 18–49. The episode received positive reviews from critics, who praised the writing, humor and Nick Kroll's guest appearance.

== Plot ==
Jenna (Beanie Feldstein) sleeps through the night. By next morning, her roommate Shanice (Veronika Slowikowska) finds her with her eyes open and calls an ambulance as she is pronounced dead. As they prepare to take her, she suddenly wakes up and runs back to her dorm room.

In order to conquer Staten Island, the vampires seek an alliance with Simon the Devious (Nick Kroll), owner of a nightclub and leader of the vampires in Manhattan. Before they leave, Laszlo (Matt Berry) decides to wear an old hat, which was made from a witch skin. Nadja (Natasia Demetriou) believes the hat is cursed, as bad luck starts to happen to Laszlo every time he wears it. At the nightclub, Guillermo is separated from the vampires, and spends time at a room with other familiars. The rest of the vampires meet with Simon, who also introduces some of his colleagues. After one of the vampires tries to eat him, Guillermo decides to leave the nightclub.

When the vampires explain their plans, Simon agrees to help them, but he wants Laszlo's hat. Intimidated by his colleagues, Laszlo reluctantly agrees and gives him the hat. However, Simon breaks his promise and orders them to leave the nightclub. After they leave, the club explodes after Simon uses a fire arrow. To compensate Guillermo for their mistreatment, Nandor (Kayvan Novak) decides to take him for a flight through the city. However, Nandor accidentally lets him go and Guillermo falls on top of a truck, sending him to the hospital. At the same hospital, Laszlo finds a bandaged Simon and retrieves his hat.

== Production ==
=== Development ===
In March 2019, FX confirmed that the fourth episode of the season would be titled "Manhattan Night Club", and that it would be written by co-executive producer Josh Lieb, and directed by series creator Jemaine Clement. This was Scharpling's first writing credit, and Clement's third directing credit.

== Reception ==
=== Viewers ===
In its original American broadcast, "Manhattan Night Club" was seen by an estimated 0.439 million household viewers with a 0.15 in the 18-49 demographics. This means that 0.15 percent of all households with televisions watched the episode. This was a 43% increase in viewership from the previous episode, which was watched by 0.305 million household viewers with a 0.11 in the 18-49 demographics.

With DVR factored in, the episode was watched by 1.14 million viewers with a 0.5 in the 18-49 demographics.

=== Critical reviews ===
"Manhattan Night Club" received positive reviews from critics. Katie Rife of The A.V. Club gave the episode a "B" grade and wrote, "Nick Kroll is always hilarious, and his one-episode arc as Manhattan vampire king Simon the Devious so dominated 'Manhattan Night Club' that the rest of the cast seemed to be holding back so he could have all the best line readings. The show's casting for its guest stars has been on point, making it hard to pick a favorite, but Kroll might be it for me so far."

Tony Sokol of Den of Geek gave the episode a 4 star rating out of 5 and wrote, "'Manhattan Night Club' continues to rib the reality TV formula with an on-target sit-com sensibility, while also keeping the situations in the comedy fresh. The vampire and horror myths continue to pay off even as the series veers towards making the legends as mundane as inhumanly possible." Greg Wheeler of The Review Geek gave the episode a 4 star rating out of 5 and wrote, "Much like the previous episode, What We Do In The Shadows continues its good vibes with a blend of comedy and unpredictable drama. Quite whether this will be sustained throughout the season is still up for debate but for now, there's enough here to make this vampire comedy one of the biggest surprises of the year."
