= Baron's Night Out =

- What We Do in the Shadows episode
- Episode no.: Season 1 Episode 6
- Directed by: Jackie van Beek
- Written by: Iain Morris
- Cinematography by: DJ Stipsen
- Editing by: Shawn Paper; Tom Eagles
- Production code: XWS01005
- Original air date: May 1, 2019
- Running time: 21 minutes

Guest appearances
- Doug Jones as Baron Afaras; Anthony Atamanuik as Sean Rinaldi

Episode chronology
← Previous "Animal Control"	Next → "The Trial"

"Baron's Night Out" is the sixth episode of the first season of the American mockumentary comedy horror television series What We Do in the Shadows, set in the franchise of the same name. The episode was written by consulting producer Iain Morris, and directed by Jackie van Beek. It was released on FX on May 1, 2019.

The series is set in Staten Island, New York City. Like the 2014 film, the series follows the lives of vampires in the city. These consist of three vampires, Nandor, Laszlo, and Nadja. They live alongside Colin Robinson, an energy vampire; and Guillermo, Nandor's familiar. The series explores the absurdity and misfortunes experienced by the vampires. In the episode, the vampires accompany the Baron on a night out in town to explore, just as they plan on killing him.

According to Nielsen Media Research, the episode was seen by an estimated 0.418 million household viewers and gained a 0.17 ratings share among adults aged 18–49. The episode received positive reviews from critics, who praised the humor and cliffhanger, although some had mixed reactions to the Baron's demise.

== Plot ==
The Baron (Doug Jones) awakens from his sleep. After seeing that the vampires failed in conquering the New World, he demands to go out to the city, during which he kills the documentary's sound recordist. The vampires are tired of the Baron, and start conspiring about killing him. Unaware to them, the Baron's familiar (Gloria Laino) overhears their conversation.

After providing him with normal clothing, the Baron openly tries to establish his dominion, even blood-sucking many people in the street. While the vampires are not fond of him, they eventually come to warm up to him, and drain people together at multiple bars. During their time together, the Baron opens up about his inability to have children, as well as losing his interest in conquering. However, their cover is almost blown when they accidentally reveal that they planned in killing him. They manage to convince him they were merely joking. The Baron also tries pizza for the first time, causing him to fly through his vomiting, almost killing himself.

At a nightclub, the vampires and the Baron dance. During this, they consume the blood of some of the partygoers, who were using drugs. They return to the house just as the sun is about to rise, confusing Colin Robinson (Mark Proksch) about their actions. As they take him back to the attic, the Baron starts playing with a ray of sunlight passing through the roof. He accidentally slips, causing him to fall all the way down to the entrance. The Baron reaffirms he is fine, laughing at the situation. However, Guillermo (Harvey Guillén) arrives and the opening of the door causes the sunlight to enter the Baron's zone, burning him to death and shocking Nandor (Kayvan Novak), Laszlo (Matt Berry), Nadja (Natasia Demetriou), Colin Robinson and the Baron's familiar.

== Production ==
=== Development ===
In April 2019, FX confirmed that the sixth episode of the season would be titled "Baron's Night Out", and that it would be written by consulting producer Iain Morris, and directed by Jackie van Beek. This was Morris' first writing credit, and van Beek's second directing credit.

== Reception ==
=== Viewers ===
In its original American broadcast, "Baron's Night Out" was seen by an estimated 0.418 million household viewers with a 0.17 in the 18-49 demographics. This means that 0.17 percent of all households with televisions watched the episode. This was a 30% increase in viewership from the previous episode, which was watched by 0.320 million household viewers with a 0.13 in the 18-49 demographics.

With DVR factored in, the episode was watched by 0.982 million viewers with a 0.4 in the 18-49 demographics.

=== Critical reviews ===
"Baron's Night Out" received positive reviews from critics. Katie Rife of The A.V. Club gave the episode a "B–" grade and wrote, "Narratively, this felt like a bit of a cop-out to me; why even introduce the idea of a season-long story arc, only to let it literally go up in flames a little more than midway through? If a more episodic style was what the show's writers had in mind, that's fine, but this seemed like trying to have it both ways. I realize I'm contradicting myself here, but even though I've written in previous recaps about my desire to see the vampires out on the town and to wrap up some of those dangling plot points, this week's episode, which did just that, wasn't quite as funny to me as 'Manhattan Night Club,' which also put the vampires on the nightlife scene."

Tony Sokol of Den of Geek gave the episode a 4 star rating out of 5 and wrote, "What We Do in the Shadows' 'Baron's Night Out' succeeds because it commits the greatest violation of the unnatural order by which the vampires live: They let a house guest eat the sound recordist." Greg Wheeler of The Review Geek gave the episode a 3.5 star rating out of 5 and wrote, "Once again What We Do In The Shadows delivers another enjoyable episode. The comedy is on point, with a perfect fourth wall break midway through to accentuate the punch line. The actual narrative is decent too and quite what the Baron's death means for the other vampires remains to be seen. For now though, there's enough here to make What We Do In The Shadows one of the better comedies released this year."
