= Animal control =

Animal control may refer to:

- The work of an animal control service
- Pest control, killing or otherwise controlling the population of species regarded as pests
- Animal Control (TV series), a 2023 American TV sitcom on Fox
- "Animal Control" (Parks and Recreation), a 2013 television episode
- "Animal Control" (The Shield), a 2008 television episode
- "Animal Control" (What We Do in the Shadows), a 2019 television episode
