= Asylum (2015 TV series) =

British comedy series

- Genre: Comedy
- Created by: Kayvan Novak and Tom Thostrup
- Written by: Peter Bowden & Thom Phipps
- Directed by: Iain B. MacDonald
- Starring: Ben Miller; Kayvan Novak; Niky Wardley; Yasmine Akram
- Country of origin: United Kingdom
- Original language: English
- No. of series: 1
- No. of episodes: 3

Production
- Running time: 30 minutes
- Production company: 2le Media

Original release
- Network: BBC Four
- Release: 9 February – 23 February 2015

Asylum is a British comedy series which was shown on BBC Four from 9 to 23 February 2015. The satirical comedy series revolves around a whistleblower and an internet pirate who find themselves trapped together under the threat of extradition in the London embassy of a fictional Latin American country.

The show was inspired by Julian Assange’s two-year stay in the Ecuadorian embassy and the controversial entrepreneur Kim Dotcom. The show was initially conceived by fonejacker star, Kayvan Novak and Tom Thostrup, before being written by Thom Phipps and Peter Bowden.

== Reception ==
Reviews of the show called it "boring" and said it "just wasn't funny enough."

One of the writers of the series Thom Phipps once called for the police to publicly shoot the Wikileaks founder in the head. On the day Julian Assange was given political asylum, by the government of Ecuador, Phipps tweeted: "If the met [police] want to regain my trust they should drag Assange out the embassy + shoot him in the back of th head in the middle of traf square." Emmy Butlin lodged a complaint with the BBC over its decision to employ Phipps on the basis that he "advocated for the public extrajudicial assassination" of the Wikileaks founder. The BBC's response was that: "Unfortunately Mr Philip's [sic] is not a BBC member of staff and is not representing the BBC. Therefore we will not be commenting on Twitter posts made by third parties."

The series has yet to be released on DVD.

== Cast and crew ==
Written by Thom Phipps and Peter Bowden

Principal cast and characters

- Ben Miller as Dan Hern
- Kayvan Novak as Rafael
- Niky Wardley as Lorna
- Yasmine Akram as Rosa
- Dustin Demri-Burns as Ludo Backslash
- John Guerrasio as Mo
- Darrell D'Silva as Castillo
- David Cross as Juan Pablo
- Ayo Mary Laurent as Mary

== Episodes ==
No.	Title	Directed by	Written by	Original release date
1	"Strange Bedfellows"	Iain B. MacDonald	Peter Bowden & Thom Phipps	9 February 2015
After a year in the El Rican embassy under the threat of arrest and a death sentence by the US, after whistleblowing CIA cover ups, Dan is bored. With little hope of getting out, Dan prepares for a newspaper interview, hoping that he will be able to leave the embassy. However the embassy want to attract people to the embassy ball, but Dan is old news and nobody wants to come. So the embassy bring in another international criminal- internet pirate Ludo Backslash to bunk with Dan.
2	"Project Siren"	Iain B. MacDonald	Peter Bowden & Thom Phipps	16 February 2015
MI6 try to lure Dan out of the embassy by setting up an online dating site trap. Meanwhile the CIA have placed a mole in the embassy who is leaking staff secrets and framing Dan for it. Ludo is eagerly awaiting for his birthday and expecting a surprise party, but things have to be put on hold as MI6 and the CIA draw closer to Dan
3	"Public Relations"	Iain B. MacDonald	Peter Bowden & Thom Phipps	23 February 2015
Dan decides to raise his public profile and promote his manifesto by holding a press conference. However he accidentally claims that the El Ricans are torturing him, which damages their world cup bid. The El Rican foreign minister is called out to persuade Dan to apologise. But with his new world popularity, Dan is not so keen.
