= The Trial (What We Do in the Shadows) =

- What We Do in the Shadows episode
- Episode no.: Season 1 Episode 7
- Directed by: Taika Waititi
- Written by: Jemaine Clement
- Cinematography by: DJ Stipsen
- Editing by: Shawn Paper; Yana Gorskaya
- Production code: XWS01006
- Original air date: May 8, 2019
- Running time: 26 minutes

Guest appearances
- Kristen Schaal as The Guide; Taika Waititi as Viago von Dorna Schmarten Scheden Heimburg; Jemaine Clement as Vladislav the Poker; Tilda Swinton as Tilda; Evan Rachel Wood as Evan the Immortal Princess of the Undead; Danny Trejo as Danny; Paul Reubens as Paul; Wesley Snipes as Wesley; Jonathan Brugh as Deacon Brucke; Dave Bautista as Garrett; Alexandra Henrikson as Vasillika the Defiler; Doug Jones as Baron Afanas

Episode chronology
← Previous "Baron's Night Out"	Next → "Citizenship"

"The Trial" is the seventh episode of the first season of the American mockumentary comedy horror television series What We Do in the Shadows, set in the franchise of the same name. The episode was written by series creator Jemaine Clement, and directed by executive producer Taika Waititi. It was released on FX on May 8, 2019.

The series is set in Staten Island, New York City. Like the 2014 film, the series follows the lives of vampires in the city. These consist of three vampires, Nandor, Laszlo, and Nadja. They live alongside Colin Robinson, an energy vampire; and Guillermo, Nandor's familiar. The series explores the absurdity and misfortunes experienced by the vampires. In the episode, the vampires are summoned before the Vampiric Council for their role in the Baron's death.

According to Nielsen Media Research, the episode was seen by an estimated 0.527 million household viewers and gained a 0.22 ratings share among adults aged 18–49. The episode received critical acclaim, which praised the performances, cameos, humor, writing, character development and Waititi's directing.

== Plot ==
The vampires bury the Baron (Doug Jones) in a casket, although they have no memory of the night's events due to the amount of drug in their consumed blood. Ravens start harassing them outside, which is a sign of bad luck. A woman only known as the Guide (Kristen Schaal) visits them, telling them they will need to appear before the Vampiric Council at the Temple of Blood-Devourers.

The vampires are led by the Guide to a building, where they descend into the basement to the Vampiric Council. They are questioned by Garrett (Dave Bautista) and Vasillika the Defiler (Alexandra Henrikson) about the Baron's death, affirming their innocence. While they are convinced of their innocence, they reveal they are actually prisoners, with Garrett unaware that Laszlo (Matt Berry) was involved in his imprisonment. They are brought over the Vampiric Council, which consists of many vampires across many continents. These include Viago (Taika Waititi), Deacon (Jonathan Brugh), Vladislav the Poker (Jemaine Clement), Tilda (Tilda Swinton), Evan the Immortal Princess of the Undead (Evan Rachel Wood), Danny (Danny Trejo), Paul (Paul Reubens), and Wesley (Wesley Snipes). To the vampires' surprise, Colin Robinson (Mark Proksch) also forms part of the Council.

The Council brings the Baron's familiar (Gloria Laino) as a witness, speaking for the first time to accuse them of providing food for the Baron, as well as conspiring in killing him. Guillermo (Harvey Guillén) is also brought as a witness, confessing that he killed the Baron. This is met with laughter by the Council, as they do not see him as a threat. The Council is willing to let the vampires go, as they did not like the Baron, but consider killing and eating Guillermo. Nandor (Kayvan Novak) takes the blame, so Tilda sentences him, Laszlo and Nadja (Natasia Demetriou) to die, by having them locked in a well in which they will be exposed to sunlight. As he tries to find a way out, Guillermo accidentally kills a vampire and flees outside in a panic. Before they die, they are saved by Colin Robinson, who takes them in a box in their bat forms. As they walk home, Guillermo questions if Nandor will ever turn him into a vampire, despite serving him for ten years. Back at the well, the documentary crew is revealed to have been left behind.

== Production ==
=== Development ===
In April 2019, FX confirmed that the seventh episode of the season would be titled "The Trial", and that it would be written by series creator Jemaine Clement, and directed by executive producer Taika Waititi. This was Clement's second writing credit, and Waititi's second directing credit.

=== Casting ===
Jemaine Clement said that the idea to introduce many guest stars originated from a meeting he had with Tilda Swinton at South by Southwest. Swinton suggested he could make "something where our vampire characters are together", referencing to Clement's role in the 2014 film and Swinton's role in Only Lovers Left Alive. Paul Simms said that the idea was planned for the season finale, but they moved it up as "no one expects the big thing to happen in the middle of the season." Besides Swinton, the episode had guest appearances by actors who previously appeared as vampires in other projects. These included Paul Reubens in Buffy the Vampire Slayer, Wesley Snipes in Blade, Danny Trejo in From Dusk till Dawn, and Evan Rachel Wood in True Blood. Waititi and Clement already mentioned they did not plan to reprise their roles, but having Jonathan Brugh alongside them motivated them in doing so.

The producers offered Kiefer Sutherland to appear, having previously portrayed a vampire in The Lost Boys, but he declined. They also contacted Brad Pitt, having played a vampire in Interview with the Vampire, but the producers did not develop any further. His co-star, Tom Cruise, was never approached. Alexander Skarsgård, Wood's co-star in True Blood, was open to guest starring but scheduling conflicts prevented it. According to Waititi, one of the stars in the guest list was Cate Blanchett, despite never playing a vampire. While Blanchett was open to appearing in the episode, Waititi refused as she did not play a vampire. Robert Pattinson, who played a vampire in The Twilight Saga, is also referenced in this episode where Evan Rachel Wood said she talked to Rob and he "didn't want to come & wants to leave it behind".

== Reception ==
=== Viewers ===
In its original American broadcast, "The Trial" was seen by an estimated 0.527 million household viewers with a 0.22 in the 18-49 demographics. This means that 0.22 percent of all households with televisions watched the episode. This was a 26% increase in viewership from the previous episode, which was watched by 0.418 million household viewers with a 0.17 in the 18-49 demographics.

With DVR factored in, the episode was watched by 1.24 million viewers with a 0.6 in the 18-49 demographics.

=== Critical reviews ===
"The Trial" received critical acclaim. Katie Rife of The A.V. Club gave the episode an "A" grade and wrote, "There really is no substitute for Taika Waititi, is there? This week's What We Do In The Shadows took the plot in the direction I thought it might go after The Baron's unceremonious second death last week, and while yes, I am happy that a lifetime devoted to consuming as much narrative storytelling as humanly possible worked out in my favor this one time, Waititi's typically sprightly direction on 'The Trial' ensured that it was never boring, even if I did see it coming."

Tony Sokol of Den of Geek gave the episode a 4.5 star rating out of 5 and wrote, "What We Do in the Shadows' 'The Trial' may end in a mockery of justice, as no one liked the victim to begin with, but the verdict for the episode is final and damning. It is the best episode since last week and probably will remain so until next week." Greg Wheeler of The Review Geek gave the episode a 4.5 star rating out of 5 and wrote, "What We Do In The Shadows delivers a very funny and well written episode. Continuing on from last week, the plot has a distinct arc to it and there's a few nicely worked twists here too to keep things interesting. The celebrity appearances are certainly unexpected and the sheer number of famous faces here is pretty impressive too. For the most part, they all slot nicely into this world and what better way to celebrate the show's renewal, than by knocking it out the park with an excellent episode."
