= Werewolf Feud =

- What We Do in the Shadows episode
- Episode no.: Season 1 Episode 3
- Directed by: Jemaine Clement
- Written by: Josh Lieb
- Cinematography by: DJ Stipsen
- Editing by: Yana Gorskaya; Shawn Paper
- Production code: XWS01004
- Original air date: April 10, 2019
- Running time: 25 minutes

Guest appearances
- Vanessa Bayer as Evie Russell; Anthony Atamanuik as Sean Rinaldi; Arj Barker as Arjan

Episode chronology
← Previous "City Council"	Next → "Manhattan Night Club"

"Werewolf Feud" is the third episode of the first season of the American mockumentary comedy horror television series What We Do in the Shadows, set in the franchise of the same name. The episode was written by consulting producer Josh Lieb, and directed by series creator Jemaine Clement. It was released on FX on April 10, 2019.

The series is set in Staten Island, New York City. Like the 2014 film, the series follows the lives of vampires in the city. These consist of three vampires, Nandor, Laszlo, and Nadja. They live alongside Colin Robinson, an energy vampire; and Guillermo, Nandor's familiar. The series explores the absurdity and misfortunes experienced by the vampires. In the episode, werewolves interfere with Laszlo's topiary, causing the vampires to face them. Meanwhile, Colin's new co-worker turns out to be an emotional vampire.

According to Nielsen Media Research, the episode was seen by an estimated 0.305 million household viewers and gained a 0.11 ratings share among adults aged 18–49. The episode received positive reviews from critics, who praised the humor, originality and special make-up.

== Plot ==
Laszlo (Matt Berry) shows the documentary crew his topiary garden, including a section where he has sculpted the vulvas of many of his lovers, including Nadja. However, he notes that a werewolf urinated in the area, prompting him to set the place with traps. The following night, a werewolf falls into the trap, forcing the vampires to take him inside. Nandor (Kayvan Novak) states that this may cause trouble due to a 1993 pact decreeing that werewolves should not interfere with vampires. The werewolf swears revenge and escapes.

Colin Robinson (Mark Proksch) sees his place at the office challenged, as a woman named Evie (Vanessa Bayer) is introduced. Evie is an emotional energy vampire who feeds off people's pity, which she achieves by telling sad stories. With both aware of each other's nature, they have a fight in the empty office where they try to feed off each other's energy. After the fight, they decide to go to dinner. They decide to collaborate by feeding on different energy as well as starting a relationship. Nevertheless, Colin Robinson later breaks up with her, feeling that the relationship is not healthy for him.

The werewolves arrive at the house, where they intend to engage in a fight with the vampires. Laszlo convinces them to move their fight to a building's rooftop, where he will face one of them as a champion. As the werewolf turns, Nandor uses a chew-toy to throw it off the roof, causing him to jump, severely wounding himself and granting victory to the vampires. Laszlo returns to his topiary, now without getting concerned about the werewolves.

== Production ==
=== Development ===
In March 2019, FX confirmed that the third episode of the season would be titled "Werewolf Feud", and that it would be written by consulting producer Josh Lieb, and directed by series creator Jemaine Clement. This was Lieb's first writing credit, and Clement's second directing credit.

== Reception ==
=== Viewers ===
In its original American broadcast, "Werewolf Feud" was seen by an estimated 0.305 million household viewers with a 0.11 in the 18-49 demographics. This means that 0.11 percent of all households with televisions watched the episode. This was a massive 54% decrease in viewership from the previous episode, which was watched by 0.658 million household viewers with a 0.3 in the 18-49 demographics.

With DVR factored in, the episode was watched by 0.943 million viewers with a 0.4 in the 18-49 demographics.

=== Critical reviews ===
"Werewolf Feud" received positive reviews from critics. Katie Rife of The A.V. Club gave the episode a "B" grade and wrote, "I didn't realize how badly I needed a Matt Berry monologue about erotic topiary in my life until it happened. Bolstered by Berry’s hilarious cold open, this week's episode of What We Do In The Shadows went by just as fast as last week's, but felt more narratively satisfying. That's probably because both of the week's storylines wrapped up by the end of the episode — which is undoubtedly more traditionally sitcom-esque than previous installments of the series, but is preferable to yet another dropped Nadja storyline."

Tony Sokol of Den of Geek gave the episode a 4 star rating out of 5 and wrote, "What We Do in the Shadows continues to poke fun at all things vampire in 'Werewolf Feud.' The jokes all have bite, and the special effects go for the jugular. The players fully commit to the reverence they pay to the not-so-ancient traditions, spoofing horror movies and real life occult practices equally. The energies the actors exchange make for amusing alchemy."

Lisa Babick of TV Fanatic gave the episode a 4.5 star rating out of 5 and wrote, "There's no better way to escape the problems of the real world than watching a group of ridiculous vampires deal with theirs. Colin stole the show on 'Werewolf Feud' when he discovered a new vampire had joined his office pool. Colin keeps getting better and better." Greg Wheeler of The Review Geek gave the episode a 4.5 star rating out of 5 and wrote, "With the introduction of werewolves this episode, What We Do In The Shadows does a fantastic job mixing things up and keeping the show unpredictable. The comedy remains throughout the episode too and there's a great array of jokes here. While Guillermo does take a bit of a backseat this episode, the other characters showcased shine, including the werewolves themselves."
