= Pilot (What We Do in the Shadows) =

- What We Do in the Shadows episode
- Episode no.: Season 1 Episode 1
- Directed by: Taika Waititi
- Written by: Jemaine Clement
- Cinematography by: Christian Sprenger
- Editing by: Yana Gorskaya
- Production code: XWS01001
- Original release date: March 27, 2019
- Running time: 30 minutes

Guest appearances
- Doug Jones as Baron Afaras; Jake McDorman as Jeff Suckler; Beanie Feldstein as Jenna

Episode chronology
← Previous —	Next → "City Council"

"Pilot" is the series premiere of the American mockumentary comedy horror television series What We Do in the Shadows, set in the franchise of the same name. The episode was written by series creator Jemaine Clement, and directed by executive producer Taika Waititi, both of whom worked as writers and directors of the film. It was released on FX on March 27, 2019.

The series is set in Staten Island, New York City. Like the 2014 film, the series follows the lives of vampires in the city. These consist of three vampires, Nandor, Laszlo, and Nadja. They live alongside Colin Robinson, an energy vampire; and Guillermo, Nandor's familiar. The series explores the absurdity and misfortunes experienced by the vampires.

According to Nielsen Media Research, the episode was seen by an estimated 0.617 million household viewers and gained a 0.2 ratings share among adults aged 18–49. The series premiere received mostly positive reviews from critics, who praised the humor, performances and Waititi's directing. Nevertheless, some felt that the episode lacked a plot, while also questioning the longevity of the series.

== Plot ==
A documentary crew follows Guillermo (Harvey Guillén), who serves as a servant in a house. He introduces them to his master, Nandor (Kayvan Novak), a 760-year-old vampire, to whom Guillermo has served for ten years as his familiar. Two other vampires live with Nandor: Laszlo (Matt Berry) and his wife, Nadja (Natasia Demetriou). The vampires explain some of their backstories, which include Nandor serving as a warrior in the Ottoman Empire and Laszlo being turned into a vampire after being hypnotized by Nadja centuries ago.

The vampires receive a letter from Baron Afanas, an ancient vampire from the Old Country who believes vampires should rule the world, stating that he will visit their house. Their meeting is interrupted with the arrival of their other roommate, Colin Robinson (Mark Proksch), an energy vampire who drains people's energy by talking to them. As the vampires prepare to retrieve his casket, Guillermo is assigned to bring virgins for a feast. He brings two LARPers, Jenna (Beanie Feldstein) and Jonathan (Hayden Szeto) to the house. At night, Laszlo and Nadja stalk pedestrians to drink their blood. Unbeknownst to Laszlo, Nadja is stalking a man named Jeff (Jake McDorman), who is the reincarnation of her former lover, Gregor, a knight decapitated in each life.

The ceremony begins, with the Baron (Doug Jones) stepping out of his casket. After draining some of the offered humans, he expresses his disappointment upon seeing that they have not conquered their "New World", Staten Island. The Baron threatens to kill the vampires for good if they do not conquer Staten Island. To complicate matters, Jenna and Jonathan are now useless to the Baron, as they have been drained after listening to Colin Robinson. Nandor tells Guillermo he is giving him a gift for his ten years of service, delighting Guillermo as he has always wanted to be a vampire. Instead, Nandor gives him a glitter portrait, disappointing him. After placing Nandor in his casket to sleep, Guillermo considers leaving the sunlight pass through the window, but eventually decides against it and leaves the room. At the attic where the Baron sleeps in his casket, a board drops down, allowing the sunlight to enter the room.

== Production ==
=== Development ===
In February 2019, FX confirmed that the first episode of the season would be titled "Pilot", and that it would be written by series developer Jemaine Clement, and directed by executive producer Taika Waititi.

== Reception ==
=== Viewers ===
In its original American broadcast, "Pilot" was seen by an estimated 0.617 million household viewers with a 0.2 in the 18-49 demographics. This means that 0.2 percent of all households with televisions watched the episode.

With DVR factored in, the episode was watched by 1.56 million viewers with a 0.6 in the 18-49 demographics.

=== Critical reviews ===
"Pilot" received mostly positive reviews from critics. Katie Rife of The A.V. Club gave the episode a "B+" grade and wrote, "Waititi and Clement's fingerprints are all over the pilot, so it'll be interesting to see how the show settles into itself as the season unfolds and new writers and directors are introduced. For now, though, What We Do in the Shadows the TV series is both different and the same as What We Do in the Shadows the movie, and overall that's a good thing. As long as the series stays true to its predecessor's sense of humor and continues to focus on its characters, it should make the transition between mediums just fine."

Tony Sokol of Den of Geek gave the episode a 4 star rating out of 5 and wrote, "What We Do in the Shadows doesn't stay in the shadows. It only plays there. Much like Baron Afanas, they let it all hang out. These are flawed vampires who started out as flawed humans. They've faced and run from adversity. The worst thing they have to face now is each other, which they are doomed to do for eternity. The oddly assembled crew for Syfy's Mad Mad House only had to do it for a season and it simply drained them. The series' introduction is a fun sendup of the vampire mythos and the true crime in real time culture."

Lisa Babick of TV Fanatic gave the episode a 4.75 star rating out of 5 and wrote, "Overall, the premiere episode of What We Do in The Shadows was a lot of fun and I can't wait to again chuckle into the night with the ridiculous antics of this group of vampire misfits." Greg Wheeler of The Review Geek gave the episode a 4.5 star rating out of 5 and wrote, "While some may lament how slow-paced this one feels compared to the film, the serialized remake has a lot of positives, making it one of the best comedies of the year so far. Whether it can keep this up throughout the season remains to be seen but for now, What We Do In The Shadows gets off to a fantastic start."
