= Yasmine Akram =

Irish actress

- Born: 11 March 1982 (age 44); Sharjah, United Arab Emirates
- Education: Royal Academy of Dramatic Art
- Occupations: Actress; comedian; writer

Yasmine Akram (born 11 March 1982) is an Irish-Pakistani actress, writer and comedian. She has written comedy sketches for the BBC and Channel 4, and played Janine Hawkins in the third series of Sherlock.

== Early life and education ==
Yasmine Akram was born on 11 March 1982 in Sharjah in the United Arab Emirates. Her family settled in Drogheda, Ireland when she was 18 months old. Her father is originally from Pakistan. Her Irish mother Mona is from Drogheda and still lives in the town. She has a sister called Masooma.

From the age of 14, Akram collaborated with the Calipo Theatre and the Picture Company. She graduated from the Royal Academy of Dramatic Art where she studied acting.

== Career ==
After graduating from drama school, Akram wrote comedy sketches for the BBC and Channel 4, and hosted for BBC Radio. She wrote her first play, 10 Dates with Mad Mary, a monologue about a young woman's struggles after leaving prison, and performed the play at Project Arts Centre in Ireland in 2010. This was adapted into the feature film A Date for Mad Mary in 2016.

She writes and performs as half of London-based comedy duo Ford and Akram with English comedian Louise Ford. The duo's live show in 2011 was directed by Alistair McGowan for the Edinburgh Festival Fringe. In 2013, she co-wrote and co-presented BBC Radio 4's Irish Micks and Legends with Aisling Bea, with whom she worked on the Channel 4 sketch comedy LOL.

In 2014, she portrayed Janine Hawkins opposite Benedict Cumberbatch's Sherlock Holmes in two episodes of the third series of Sherlock. She reprised the role in the 2016 special, "The Abominable Bride", in which her character's name was Janine Donlevy.

== Filmography ==
=== Film ===
Year	Title	Role	Notes
2016	London Town	Nurse	
2018	Metal Heart	Anna	

=== Television ===
Year	Title	Role	Notes
2002	A Scare at Bedtime	Rita Quimbly	Episode: "Model Wife
2004	Love Is the Drug	Aisling	1 episode
2010	Peep Show	Yana	Episode: "St Hospitals"
2010	L.O.L	Various	1 episode
2013	Common Ground	Restaurant Manager	Episode: "William & Sinclair"
2013	It's Kevin	Various	2 episodes
2013	London Irish	Check-in Girl	1 episode
2014	The Midnight Beast	Jess	Episode: "Beast Holiday Ever"
2014	The Centre	Amanda Menton	Series regular
2014–2015	Stella	Parvadi	Recurring role
2014–2016	Sherlock	Janine Hawkins	Recurring role
2015	Count Arthur Strong	Gemma	Episode: "Still Life"
2015	Asylum	Rosa	Miniseries
2015	Undercover	Lara	Series regular
2015	Unforgotten	Kelly	2 episodes
2016	Murder in Successville	Nigella Lawson	Episode: "Head, Shoulders, Knees & Toes"
2016	Outsiders	Yasmine	Miniseries
2016–2018	Lovesick	Maria "Jonesy" Jones	Recurring role
2018	Damned	Hazel	1 episode
2018	Action Team	Gemma Stone	Episode: "Push the Button"
2018	Humans	Audrey Ballard	3 episodes
2018	Women on the Verge	Samara	3 episodes
2018–2019	The Reluctant Landlord	Julie	Series regular
2018–2020	There She Goes	Helen	Series regular
2019	Gold Digger	Elmear Day	Miniseries
2020	Avenue 5	Hannah	Recurring role
2020	Flack	Ashley Dillon	Episode: "Danny & Deepak"
2022–2024	Bad Sisters	Nora	Recurring role
2023	Beyond Paradise	Carol Meadows	1 episode

=== Theatre ===
Year	Title	Role	Venue	Notes
1998	Love Is The Drug	Foxy	Droichead Arts Centre, Drogheda	with "Calipo Theatre Company"
1999	Xaviers	Joanne	Droichead Arts Centre, Drogheda	with "Calipo Theatre Company"
2000	Makin' Hits	Various roles	Droichead Arts Centre, Drogheda	with "Calipo Theatre Company"
2001	Getting 2 Level 10	Helen	Droichead Arts Centre, Drogheda	with "Calipo Theatre Company"
2009	The Wicked Lady	Paulina	New Vic Theatre, Newcastle-under-Lyme	
2010	Ellamenope Jones		Project Arts Centre, Dublin	
2011	The Big Fellah	Karelma	Lyric Theatre, London	with Out of Joint Theatre Company
2017	The Retreat	Tara	Park Theatre, London	
