= Facejacker =

- Directed by: Ed Tracy; Kayvan Novak
- Starring: Kayvan Novak
- Country of origin: United Kingdom
- Original language: English
- No. of series: 2
- No. of episodes: 11

Production
- Running time: 23 min per episode (1 Advert Break)
- Production companies: Film4; Hat Trick Productions

Original release
- Network: Channel 4
- Release: 16 April 2010 – 1 May 2012

Related
- Fonejacker

Facejacker is a Channel 4 comedy series which started on 16 April 2010. It follows the similar show Fonejacker. Kayvan Novak adopts various disguises (with the aid of prosthetics), including several characters heard in Fonejacker. To promote the show, Novak appeared at Channel 4's Comedy Gala as Terry Tibbs on 5 April.

Series 2 finished filming in July 2011 and premiered on 27 March 2012. The series concluded on 1 May 2012. Novak planned to create a film based on the show's characters, and was in talks with Film4 and Hat Trick Productions.

== Characters ==
- Augustus Kwembe is a very polite Ugandan scammer from the Republic of Uganda. He is based on the Fonejacker character George Agdgdgwngo. His catchphrase is "Scam the UK, the Augustus way". He tries to gain people's bank account details by pretending to be a hypnotherapist, traffic warden, checkout assistant, Beefeater, and others.
- Brian Badonde is a charlatan art critic who ineptly presents his fictional television show Voyage into Art with Brian Badonde. Voyage into Art explores and demonstrates the wonders of the art world, delving into subjects ranging from pottery, glass blowing, wine tasting, and dancing. Brian is a parody of the art critic Brian Sewell. He suffers from a speech impediment called "Bourettes", which forces him to begin certain words with the letter B. He occasionally encounters a loss of vocal control and ends up spluttering out noises such as "Bwah", "Boh", and "Bah". He is an overt homosexual who often attempts to flirt with the men he meets in his journeys. His trademark pashmina and extravagant shirts are seen in a diverse range of bright colours. Throughout his appearances he has been involved in a life drawing class, throwing pottery, getting himself into a noisy "MC battle" with a street youth, writing poetry, and attempting to make a documentary about Andy Warhol. Brian also appeared in a mini-series promoting the web search engine Bing, titled The Art of Technology.
- Terry Tibbs is a bald, Cockney, second-hand car salesman from Rickmansworth. He makes a TV show, The Real Terry Tibbs, to make himself recognisable as the real Terry Tibbs and not the character from Fonejacker. He appeared on several TV shows such as Come Dine with Me, Secret Millionaire, Price-drop tv, and his own show Lizard's Lair (a parody of Dragon's Den). He originally wanted Lizard's Lair to be called Terry's Hole so that he could say, "Are you man enough to enter Terry's Hole?".
- Aziz Azizzi is a journalist working for a fictional show named World Modern Developments for Iraq TV. Similar to Mr. Doovdé from Fonejacker, he believes that acronyms and initialisms are how words are spelt and not pronounced and, as a result, he mistakes them for pronounceable words such as "Joovc" (JVC) and "Puck" (PC). He is accompanied by a man simply known as "Translator". The Arabic subtitles displayed onscreen are actually English words written in a faux-Arabic font reversed to make the text look authentic. Along with Patrick, he is one of only two Facejacker characters played by Novak without the use of prosthetics.
- Dufrais Constantinople is a disabled computist with interests in media. He is Jewish (he can be seen wearing a Yarmulke) and is extremely demanding of assistants and helpers. He is in a wheelchair because he was hit jousting in a historical re-enactment, claiming, "He didn't even say charge". He is based on the character of the same name from Fonejacker.
- Zulfi is a French fast food photographer, who likes every little detail of a dish to be perfect and treats fast food like models, giving them make-up and shouting commands at them during photo shoots.
- Dr. Ali is an Iraqi plastic surgeon who overreacts to his customers' appearances, telling them that they are ugly and will have to pay for beauty. He would also overcharge them after their surgery. He claims to be the former plastic surgeon of Saddam Hussein.
- Donald Donaldson is a director who tried to make it in Hollywood, but after a tragic accident that killed four extras on his 1966 film Three Kings of Zanzibar, he quit Hollywood and returned to England. He currently works with animals to try to make them into stars.
- Augustine Kwembe is the twin sister of Augustus. She is also from the republic of Uganda. In the first episode of the second series, she works as a minicab driver inspector, with unsuspecting trainees subjected to her inappropriate behavior. Later on in the series, she poses as a lollipop lady to help people recreate the Beatles' Abbey Road album cover (with a small charge).
- Ray Fakadakis is a Scouser who has just been released from Pentonville prison; he gives career advice to school leavers. He may have been based on Scouse Steve from Fonejacker.
- Patrick is a flamboyant contestant on Terry Tibbs' show The Apprentibbs. He was planted in one of the two teams competing for Terry Tibbs to hire them, and argued with the team's leader so much that he left the team before they could meet Terry Tibbs in person (this was actually done so that Kayvan Novak could appear as Terry Tibbs when the two teams pitched their finished ideas to him). Along with Aziz Azizzi, Patrick is one of only two Facejacker characters played by Novak without the use of prosthetics.

=== Voices ===
The Fonejacker voices characters that are heard, but not seen. He himself is seen performing the voices, usually hidden around the corner from the machine he is voicing. He voices Automated Machine, Mr. Providings, Janec, and other characters as part of the audio tour. He also adopts a Northern Irish accent for the scenes in 'Moira's Drive-through'.

- Automated Machine is a Northern Irish automated voice that has appeared on several occasions. It is similar to the Fonejacker character Irish Mike and has so far been heard in Moira's drive through, on a series of Cambridge, and as an elevator voice. In the second series, it appeared with both a Yorkshire accent and an American accent.
- Mr. Providings, is an Indian man based on Sajnu from Fonejacker who works at a fast food restaurant in Moira, County Down, Northern Ireland called American Fried Chicken. He is forced to take over from the Automated Machine after it has "technical difficulties," or "goes mad," as well as being a worker on a lift.
- Yanek is a Polish man who works as a maintenance worker for lifts.

=== App ===
On 7 March 2012, the Facejacker app was launched onto the iTunes store at the price of £1.49. On the app there is a sound board for various characters from the show, exclusive videos and other extra content. The app was launched around the same time as the second series was aired and all the content on the app is from the second series of the show.

== Episodes ==
=== Series 1 (2010) ===
Episode	Information	Air date
1	Terry Tibbs uses his selling techniques to sell exercise equipment to the unsuspecting crew and viewers of Price-Drop TV.	16 April 2010
2	Terry Tibbs hosts an evening for the popular Channel 4 programme Come Dine with Me. Brian Badonde takes on an art teacher, in a naked woman painting challenge, in an art class documentary.	23 April 2010
3	Terry Tibbs visits a dating agency to get some tips on how to relate to women more successfully, while Dufrais is allowed access to the set of N-Dubz' music video shoot.	30 April 2010
4	Budding entrepreneurs pitch their ideas to Terry Tibbs in his new TV show Lizard's Lair (A parody of the show "Dragon's Den"), while Augustus Kwembe charms and confuses the tourists disguised as a Beefeater outside the Tower of London and the Fonejacker gives audio tours of Cambridge.	7 May 2010
5	Brian Badonde gets himself into a rap battle with a street youth, and Terry Tibbs becomes the Secret Millionaire while the Fonejacker traps a man in a lift.	14 May 2010

=== Series 2 (2012) ===
The second series premiered on 27 March 2012. It is set in the UK and USA.

Episode	Information	Air date
1	The organisers of a beauty pageant in Philadelphia are in for a surprise when Terry Tibbs joins them as a judge. In the UK, Augustine Kwembe (Augustus's oversexed twin sister) poses as a minicab driver inspector to groom unsuspecting male candidates. Meanwhile, the Fonejacker takes over a UGO self-service checkout, causing a lot of inconvenience to shoppers.	27 March 2012
2	Dufrais Constantinople gets the chance to spend the day behind the scenes at a baseball game in LA with three other competition winners. New character Ray Fakadakis, who has recently been released from prison, offers career advice to school leavers. Augustus, in the guise of a river patrol officer, issues fines and extracts credit card details from fishermen and boatmen. Brian has a severe reaction to cheese in a gourmet food shop in LA.	3 April 2012
3	Dufrais visits the locations from Rocky in Philadelphia via a local bus tour. The Fonejacker takes over the GPS system of a special car for tourists in San Francisco, and Brian has a one-on-one poetry lesson in New York City. Back in London, Augustus tries to extract credit card details from members of the public as they try to rent "Boris bikes".	10 April 2012
4	Terry Tibbs hosts his own Jerry Springer-style chat show in America with his son Lionel. Dufrais wins a visit to the set of a glamour calendar photo shoot featuring "girls with guns" in LA, while Brian gets a lesson in hip hop from three rappers on Venice Beach. In London, Augustine is disguised as a lollipop lady at Abbey Road, helping tourists recreate the famous Beatles album cover by stopping traffic, then trying to charge them a ridiculously high fee.	17 April 2012
5	Brian Badonde visits Pittsburgh, the birthplace of his hero Andy Warhol, to make a documentary about Warhol. Dufrais wins a visit to the set of a Star Wars porn parody in LA. Ray Fakadakis continues to give career advice to school leavers. French fast food photographer Zulfi visits an ice cream parlour to photograph their specialities.	24 April 2012
6	Terry Tibbs launches his own American version of The Apprentice entitled The Apprentibbs in a bid to find a new business partner, but the search is undermined by Patrick, another Facejacker character. The Fonejacker hijacks an American fast food drive-thru, much to the frustration of the customers, and Brian Badonde bids farewell to America with a final fling at an art gallery.	1 May 2012

== Spin-off ==
On 16 August 2012 as part of Channel 4's Funny Fortnight, Novak in his real-life guise of Terry Tibbs hosted his own chat show titled Verry Terry.

The format was that of a chat show with a live audience present, with Mickey Rourke and Anthea Turner as guests. Terry's son as seen in the Facejacker series made an appearance, alongside for the first time his father being seen on a breathing mask in a wheelchair.

The episode was a pilot and was not commissioned as a series.
