= Animal Control (What We Do in the Shadows) =

- What We Do in the Shadows episode
- Episode no.: Season 1 Episode 5
- Directed by: Jackie van Beek
- Written by: Duncan Sarkies
- Cinematography by: DJ Stipsen
- Editing by: Shawn Paper; Tom Eagles
- Production code: XWS01008
- Original air date: April 24, 2019
- Running time: 23 minutes

Guest appearances
- Jake McDorman as Jeff Suckler; Siobhan Fallon Hogan as Animal Control Officer Karen; Anthony Atamanuik as Sean Rinaldi

Episode chronology
← Previous "Manhattan Night Club"	Next → "Baron's Night Out"

"Animal Control" is the fifth episode of the first season of the American mockumentary comedy horror television series What We Do in the Shadows, set in the franchise of the same name. The episode was written by Duncan Sarkies, and directed by Jackie van Beek. It was released on FX on April 24, 2019.

The series is set in Staten Island, New York City. Like the 2014 film, the series follows the lives of vampires in the city. These consist of three vampires, Nandor, Laszlo, and Nadja. They live alongside Colin Robinson, an energy vampire; and Guillermo, Nandor's familiar. The series explores the absurdity and misfortunes experienced by the vampires. In the episode, Laszlo is accidentally caught as a bat by animal control and taken to a shelter, forcing Nandor, Colin Robinson and Guillermo to release him. Meanwhile, Nadja goes on a date with Jeff.

According to Nielsen Media Research, the episode was seen by an estimated 0.320 million household viewers and gained a 0.13 ratings share among adults aged 18–49. The episode received mostly positive reviews from critics, who praised the humor, performances and character development.

== Plot ==
After feasting, Laszlo (Matt Berry) and Nadja (Natasia Demetriou) walk home. Seeing his neighbor Phil (Eric Andrews) across their house, Laszlo decides to turn into a bat to enter his house and hypnotize him, but Nadja is not interested and leaves. As Laszlo mocks Phil, his girlfriend hears his voice. Laszlo quickly turns back into a bat, but is beaten by the girlfriend.

Nandor (Kayvan Novak), Guillermo (Harvey Guillén) and Colin Robinson (Mark Proksch) witness the event and go to Phil's house, only to discover that animal control has taken Laszlo to a shelter. With few hours left until Laszlo is exposed to sunlight, Nandor and Colin Robinson visit the animal shelter, where Nandor is surprised to discover that his hypnosis does not work on the clerks. Nandor turns into a bat and enters the holding room, taking the bat outside. He releases it, but discovers that it was a rabid bat, while Laszlo awakens and turns back to human in his cage. Meanwhile, unaware of Laszlo's incident, Nadja decides to spend time with Jeff (Jake McDorman), who takes her to a carnival. Nevertheless, Nadja expresses disappointment when "Gregor" cannot master his archery.

Nandor turns himself into a dog, so he can get captured and placed next to Laszlo in their cages. However, Nandor has no plan on how to escape. Bored by Jeff's personality, Nadja restores his memories of his past lives. They steal a horse from a mounted police and roam through the city. As they prepare to make love, Nadja is forced to leave when Guillermo informs her of Laszlo. After she leaves, Jeff is arrested for stealing the horse. She goes to the animal shelter, hypnotizes the clerk to get the password and releases Laszlo and Nandor. Having promised to release them, Laszlo returns to release the rest of the animals and walks away as cats attach themselves to him.

== Production ==
=== Development ===
In March 2019, FX confirmed that the fifth episode of the season would be titled "Animal Control", and that it would be written by Duncan Sarkies, and directed by Jackie van Beek. This was Sarkies' first writing credit, and van Beek's first directing credit.

== Reception ==
=== Viewers ===
In its original American broadcast, "Animal Control" was seen by an estimated 0.320 million household viewers with a 0.13 in the 18-49 demographics. This means that 0.13 percent of all households with televisions watched the episode. This was a 28% decrease in viewership from the previous episode, which was watched by 0.439 million household viewers with a 0.15 in the 18-49 demographics.

With DVR factored in, the episode was watched by 1.02 million viewers with a 0.4 in the 18-49 demographics.

=== Critical reviews ===
"Animal Control" received mostly positive reviews from critics. Katie Rife of The A.V. Club gave the episode a "B+" grade and wrote, "After the events of this week's What We Do In The Shadows, I can only assume that once the vampires succeed in taking over Staten Island, the employees of the municipal Animal Control department will be paraded through the streets in shirts made of cat hair as they're pelted with feces by passers-by, before they're corralled into a giant blender and whipped up into a human smoothie upon which all the creatures of the night can feast. How else to repay the indignity visited upon Laszlo this episode, after gluttony for blood leads him on an adventure that ends with him running down the street while under attack from half a dozen yowling, scratching cats?"

Tony Sokol of Den of Geek gave the episode a 4 star rating out of 5 and wrote, "After the running display of vampire clichés feeding the show, this is something to look forward to. What We Do in the Showers isn't anemic when it comes to the laughs tonight, even if the episode is sweeter than a diabetic's blood." Greg Wheeler of The Review Geek gave the episode a 4 star rating out of 5 and wrote, "With only 22 minutes to play with, What We Do In The Shadows makes the most of its limited run-time with an episode chock full of drama and comedy. There's a great array of jokes here too, playing on the tropes inherent with the series, complete with fourth wall breaks and the continued mockumentary style."
