= List of Fonejacker episodes =

The following is an episode list for the E4 series Fonejacker. The series premiered on Comedy Lab with a pilot episode, and due to much popularity, a full series started on 5 July 2007, although the series was originally going to be aired in April at some point, but was delayed. A Christmas special was aired on 20 December of the same year. Then, in 2008, a second series began on 18 September. Both series have been released on DVD including special features such as Unseen Material and audio commentaries.

Each episode is approximately 23 minutes long.

== Comedy Lab Pilot: 2006 ==
Comedy Lab Pilot aired May 2006

#	Comedy Lab Pilot
Pilot	Mr Doovdé making three calls, calling someone asking for the number for "Hooomv" in Oxford Street calling for a Doovdé player and a loocada tiv, and calling a lady asking if her car is still for sale. When she replies yes, he says it's a shame, as if she said no.; A criminal (not Dave) calling a man for a getaway driver to rob a bank. The man does not accept the offer.; Jéan Pierre phoning a car Company to put a deposit on the "Phantom" Rolls-Royce only to have phone problems while he reveals his details. He phones the car company again later to leave his details, only to have phone problems again.; George Agdgdgwngo making three calls, phoning a man picked from his database (A Phone Book) to receive a cash prize monies (£82.57) from the 1ps and 2ps people forget about, phoning from a building society asking a bank manager for her bank details so her branch can be refurbished and steam cleaned, but she threatens to call the police, and the other calling from automated telephone banking.; The Mouse phones a vet after eating poison that's on a lump of cheese. The vet is too far away so he can't be seen.; Alan calls a rickshaw driver to pick him up from terminal 4 of Heathrow airport.; The Fonejacker phones a dentist receptionist with a mouth full, to give him a broken tooth style of talking, and asks to see a dentist, but then unknown to the receptionist he asks to perform some love acts on her, but she thinks he is still making an appointment.; Mr Miggins phones a shop claiming a genie popped out of a brass lamp his wife bought, he asks for advice but the shopkeeper believes the lamp was not bought at his shop.; The Fonejacker in a queue on the phone. He goes to his rooftop with a golf club and hits golf balls off it. The balls hit nearby traffic wardens.

== Series One: 2007 ==
Series 1 Aired: 5 July – 9 August 2007

#	Series One
1.1	Mr Doovdé asking for a phone number for "Duhfs" and phoning a shop about repairing Voocrés.; George Agdgdgwngo calling three victims, asking for account details, one involving a money ironer having a cardiac arrest inside the bank vault. The last of these calls is the shortest one ever made by the Fonejacker, where George asks if he can enter a man's bank account, to which he is curtly told 'Certainly not' before saying goodbye.; Donald calling a restaurant only to be told that his wife is having an affair with another woman, making the restaurant manager feel guilty.; Terry Tibbs enquiring about a Maserati 3200.; A man with a Welsh accent claiming to have lost both of his thumbs in a freak baking accident calling a mobile phone shop to enquire about the best mobile phone for him.; The Fonejacker calls a man holding up a sign in the street, and manages to persuade him to turn it to point in the opposite direction.; The Mouse calling a pet shop to catch a cat who ate his family.; Jafool asking for a job at BigArt, giving his details by beatboxing.; Mr Broadbandings persuading a man to join Internet Service Providings, his overly priced ISP service which is 42 "megabytings" fast. At the end he feels "upsettings".; Mike calling from "Lube Up Your Butthole and Dance The Fandango Entertainment Services Ltd".; A man trying to buy a flat using the Flat Line, a worthless "automated" telephone service.
1.2	Mr Doovdé asking for a number for "Pük World" and calling an electronic store asking for a "Joovcé Lucde Tiv" and a "Joovcé Doovdé Player".; George Agdgdgwngo asking for account details after problems with a man who has been placed inside a cash point, and is a human "card reader"; Mr Miggins calling the Odeon Cinemas line assuming the woman is an automated phone service and is shouting film names and locations at her.; Terry Tibbs calling about buying wooden ladders.; The Beatboxer phoning a clothes shop about buying a shirt, describing the shirts by beatboxing.; The Mouse phoning an entertainment service to get representation for his Oasis tribute act.; Mike calling from "Wear a thistle in your fanny and whistle something nice network solutions incorporated" inquiring about an electric kettle.; A man attempting to buy a property using the "automated" Flat Line.; Brian calling an art shop, trying to give his details, only to start talking incomprehensibly which confuses the shop assistant.; Mike calling a man from "Feed Spaghetti Through Your Japseye till your Balls turn Bluetooth Solutions Inc.".; The Chinese DVD Gang calling a cinema asking if it has room for a film crew to film a movie in the back of the cinema for a "student project".; Donald calling a hotel worker asking him to spank and whip him.; Mike asking a man about his toaster claiming to be from "Roll Your Cock in Filo & Serve It As a Main IT Solutions Inc.". He then passes the phone onto his wife and Mike says he's from "Dip Your Balls in Soy & Fry Them In a Wok IT Solutions Incorporated" and wants to know about her oven gloves, claiming she's on their oven glove database, yet she says she doesn't even have oven gloves.
1.3	Mr Doovdé asking for the number for Doovlah.; Terry Tibbs calling an elderly woman about an Italian fireplace. She asks him how he is going to get to North Wales to see the fire grate, only to reply "I dunno!.... speedboat!", before the call disconnects not making it clear who hung up.; Mike calling from "Dip Your Cock in Treacle and Wave It At A Tramp Network Analysis Incorporated" asking a man about the excessive use of condiments in American themed restaurants.; George Agdgdgwngo calling a man after discovering a pigeon in a bank vault. The man gives George his account number which are supposedly lottery numbers, and gives George the answer to his security question being "Jimmy Savile". It is revealed that George was a fan of Jim'll Fix It and wrote to him many times asking to have "lots of monies".; Roger Barker trying to put a deposit down for a car he hasn't even seen, only to have the phone connection break up, making it impossible for the salesman to write down the man's details.; The Mouse calling an exterminator about humans crawling on top of the floorboards, only to end up arguing with the woman on the other end of the phone, threatening to "shit in [her] tea".; Mike calling from "You've Got Huge Bosoms and I'd Like To Put My Head Between Them I.T. Solutions Incorporated" asking a woman about her lifestyle.; Mr Broadbandings calling a woman about upgrading her mobile phone contract which is, as usual, overly-priced. After arguing with the man, the woman is put through to his "manager" only to confuse her more and offer her a 'free ring ding', only to shout "Oh piss off!" and then hang up.; A man calling a shop asking for their telephone number.; Criminal Dave calling a locksmith asking about unlocking a safe whilst robbing a bank. Whilst talking to the locksmiths, she can hear an alarm bell, and a panicking bank manager who is being threatened by Dave.; A man calling about renting a property whilst doing his job which is announcing train times (Kayvan uses a megaphone), only to confuse and frustrate the woman on the other end of the line, ending in her putting the phone down, mainly because he asked for a flat with a pond, as long as the estate agents clean it for him. After the woman hangs up, Kayvan starts laughing.; Mr Miggins calling a computer helpline about opening a file sent by a friend, which he discovers after "clicking on the box" is a pornographic video. After being bedazzled by the video, Mr Miggins becomes frustrated as he doesn't know how to close the video, not to mention his wife trying to enter the room, all of which is heard by the man on the other end of the phone.; George Agdgdgwngo phoning a man who is in bed about missing credit card details, only to be told to "fuck off".
1.4	Mr Doovdé asking for a phone number for "Duhul".; Terry Tibbs calling a man about buying a Rolls-Royce and offering a much higher price (£25,000) as most export scammers do. The seller refuses believing Terry's offer to be an export scam after mentioning 'a gentleman in Uganda who might be interested' who is presumed to be George Agdgdgwngo.; George Agdgdgwngo calling a woman telling her she has won a "serious amount of monies", which turns out to be £6.82. George also gives a long description about how he chooses the winner, which includes a meeting of delegates. One of these appears to be Lionel Richie.; Mike calling a woman from "Lurpak Your A-hole and Sell the Story to The Sun IT Recruitment Services Ltd".; Mr Doovdé calling a record store selling classical music, explaining he wanted to buy a "classic" song, but only knows the tune of it. He sings "West End Girls" by the Pet Shop Boys but with nonsense lyrics. The man in the store laughs hard, and says he has no idea what it is.; The Mouse calling Pest Control after finding a mousetrap on the floor, and asking how to disable it, but ending up trapped and impaled in the mousetrap.; A man calling a wedding video company asking for a film to be made of his honeymoon, directing it as a pornographic movie. The lady on the phone declines saying they do not cater for those sort of films, only to hang up when the man keeps on saying it's a honeymoon video.; George Agdgdgwngo calling a woman from her Building Society asking her security questions, including her name ("my name" was the answer), favourite colour ("I don't know who I'm talking to" was the answer), and sort code, only to have the woman hang up.; A BT engineer calling a book shop checking to see if their phone line is "crackly", whilst he is scrunching a crisp packet next to the mouthpiece.; A member of the Chinese DVD Gang calling a lookalike agency asking to be a Samuel L. Jackson lookalike.; A woman calling the "automated" Flat Line asking for a flat, but accidentally selecting other properties. After saying she wants a "one bedroom garden flat" she selected it correctly on her first attempt. When asked where she wants the flat, being Swansea, she is told she has selected a "two bedroom garden house in Shropshire", followed by a "three bedroom house in Shropshire" whilst the "automated" service supposedly malfunctions.; A man called Steve calling a man running a hat stall in a market, asking him confusing questions about the fruit & veg stall, only to have the man completely lost.; Bijan calling a paparazzi service whilst chasing David Beckham offering pictures and videos of him, only to crash into him.; Donald calling a massage parlour saying he's found the number in his fourteen-year-old son's telephone. He gives the woman his son's description, being 6'2", having dark curly hair, is missing three fingers on his left hand, has a pineapple-shaped mole on his forehead, doesn't like to wear socks or shoes and is believed to have stolen one of his father's bowler hats. He also asks the woman to let his son know that his father he is "onto him".
1.5	Mike calling from "Tweak Your Mum By Her Nipples and Tell Her That You Love Her Wildlife Awareness Ltd" asking a woman about the tragic plight of the wrinkled ball sack, which she claims to know about. He asks if she is a bird lover.; Terry Tibbs calling a man who's selling a fridge freezer, initially offering £900, then £1000. He turns down Terry's offers saying he wants £1500. Terry thinks this is too much so offers £1250. The man says he will sell it for £1250 if Terry asks using a woman's voice. Terry then becomes angry and tells the man to fuck off.; George Agdgdgwngo calling a woman informing her she was selected to receive a "CPM" (cash prize monies), but declines the prize when required to give her bank account details. The jingle George plays on a tape player, is later heard again in the episode.; Mr Doovdé calling a shop asking if they sell the "Puss 3" or the "Puss 2". They also talk about the Dhuss. Mr Doovdé says he will just go and buy a pük.; Brian calling a café asking if his blind date has arrived, only to regret it after being told the man Brian is meeting is short and fat.; Criminal Dave calling for a minicab to pick him up at a bank, whilst an alarm bell is ringing in the background and Dave is shouting at hostages.; George Agdgdgwngo informing a man he was won £8.27, later £8.23, but declines as he does not want anything at all, as he claims to have everything he wants. Every time he reminds the man of the prize money, he plays a tape playing a jingle in which the soundsystem blows up on the third attempt. The man is seen to the audience, as someone who has been living on an island for many years due to a plane crash.; Mr Broadbandings offering a man internet "providings". The man asks Mr Broadbandings to repeat his script twice because he likes it, but then the man complains about his Indian accent and poor usage of English. He is later put through to the manager to complain in which he argues with him about the script used to sell the "providings". The man tells the manager that the customer is always right, but the manager says the customer is talking "bloody bollocks", and later sarcastically suggests that if he thinks he's now a script writer, he should come to Bollywood to write their scripts. The man says he doesn't want to switch his providings, he wants to switch his provider, but the manager says he can only switch his providings.; Brian calling a restaurant to book a table at a restaurant, only to have his unusual speech impediment pop up when he is trying to book it.; A circus act called Vishka Vishkovsky calling a circus agency about his dancing bear act.; A man calling a fishmonger because his wife complained that the fish he bought was a goldfish.; Mike calling from "Wet Look Gel Your Crotch and Make a Quiff With Your Pubes I.T. Recruitment Services Limited" asking a man about his love life to which the man says, "This is a Sunday night! Do you you think I'm silly?" Mike replies, "Abso-fucking-lutely!"; Detective Horace Von Khute from the Telephone Fraud Prevention Unit in Zimbabwe calling a woman asking her to call him if she receives a call from a man claiming to be Detective Horace Von Khute from the Telephone Fraud Prevention Unit in Zimbabwe, who has stolen his identity. He gives a very long direct number to Zimbabwe which reads (0042) 8146148040774281438145997. Horace also notably repeats his name and department many times during the call.
1.6	Mr Doovdé calling a computer store asking for a Hüp Pük with three üsb for word processing, surfing the Woo and burning Doovd.; George Agdgdgwngo calling from British Gas saying he overcharged a man by 36,000,000 Ugandan dollars. George offers to pay the man back as long as he gives his bank details before the man declines.; A hospitalised man on a breathing machine calling a company for life insurance, only to die during the call.; Mike calling from "Walk into Your Library and Fart as Loud As You Can I.T Communications PLC" asking about a woman's love life.; Donald calling the front desk of his company to invite the man up to his office to have champagne and "fuck like rabbits".; The Mouse calling a cheese shop asking about what cheese they sell whilst hiding in a pot of Vaseline, only to be turned on and have orgasms from the names of cheese. The Mouse then sets himself on fire after attempting to light a cigarette.; A man who has redialled the Fonejacker after being fonejacked by George. He is put through to Terry Tibbs who accuses him of trying to ring George back to give his bank details. Terry then offers the man a car. The man is actually from Essex, UK, and reports his mobile number was taken from MySpace and used for the show.; Mr Broadbandings calling from "Digital Multichannel Receivings" offering a free set-top box that costs a one-off payment of £182 with a continuing cost of £18.70. The man declines despite the fact that Mr Broadbandings claims it is better than Sky Digital as the channels are not good, compared to the four channels that Mr Broadbandings is offering, them being two sports channelsings, the free movie a month, and..... BBC Four.; Mr Miggins calling a tabloid newspaper claiming to have had a balloon ride with Cary Grant in the 1940s. The man refuses to take the story on, after asking why he waited all these years to tell a newspaper.; Brian calling a property developer asking to buy a bungalow, only to completely confuse the salesman with his strange speech impediment.; George Agdgdgwngo calling a woman from her bank. He asks her to answer a security question, which is "What is the day?". Her answer was Monday, after almost saying Thursday and Tuesday. George is forced to terminate the call as he takes her first answer, being Thursday, which is incorrect.; Detective Horace Von Khute calling from the Telephone Fraud Prevention Unit asking a man about a suspicious call. Surprising, it is revealed that the man received a call from George Agdgdgwngo the previous day being told he won 1,800,000 Ugandan dollars, with the offer to sell George his passport. Horace then plays a tape containing various Fonejacker characters (which Horace calls a "Telephone Identity Parade"), including George, Donald, Terry Tibbs and Mr Doovdé, saying "So if I could just take your bank account details and sort code, and we can wire you the monies as soon as possible". The man recognises the voice of George Agdgdgwngo and is informed that Horace will be in touch. Before this the man says its number four only for Horace to play number two with that being Terry Tibbs, the man then says that's not the one, before on the second attempt Horace correctly plays Georges voice.

== Series Two: 2008 ==
Series 2 Aired: 18 September – 22 October 2008

#	Series Two
2.1	Mr Doovdé asking for the phone number for Buzum.; Terry Tibbs enquiring about a brass sculpture. The lady he is talking to is not selling the sculpture and only put the advert up, Terry then asks if she's taking 20 per cent of the takings from the buyer, only for her to say she isn't then Terry asks if she's taking 10, with her also denying this, in reply Terry says "You're doing this all wrong!". Later on the lady says she'll get back to him after speaking to the artist who is selling the sculpture, but Terry says "You don't get back to Terry Tibbs, Terry Tibbs gets back to you!". At the end of the call Terry says "Love ya!", with the lady replying with "Love you too Terry!".; Fonejacker calls a mobile phone (supposedly belonging to a waiter) that has been left in a street cleaner's dustcart. Street cleaner picks up and Fonejacker pretends to be restaurant boss and asks why he is late for work.; Stanley ringing a model shop, enquiring about Hornby figures. Starting off with train drivers, he also asks if they do "the depressed man who steps in front of a twain", "the two homeless men drinking lager in the carriages who you hope get off at the next station but never do", "the gypsies playing the accordion and getting into a fight with the passengers" and "the old man who misses the red light at a level crossing and gets hit by the twain".; Dufrais Constantinople ringing about having an electric fence installed to "keep out his neighbours".; George Agdgdgwngo ringing from "ITV 1's Britain Has Got Very Much Talent". He asks a woman for passport & bank statements so that he can verify her identify, in order for her to watch the show live and have a "tea and a hot beverage" with Ant & Dec.; Fonejacker calls a butcher's shop enquiring about prices of various products, and pretending to be interrupted by another call, makes customer announcements over a megaphone about the lower prices at Morrisons for those products.; The Chinese DVD gang call an accountant enquiring whether they need to pay tax on their pirate DVDs. It is revealed in this segment that the leader of the gang is called Charlie Wong.; Barry Childs trying to book a magic act. Initially the act sounds keen and says he is free on the proposed date, until he learns that his close contact magic will be likely to provoke a violent response from the offenders, and that several previous bookings (including clown) were assaulted, after which the act politely declines while Barry says he "has already printed the posters" so he has to come, but still declines.; Fonejacker TV Phone-in competition. Calls charged at £10.50 per minute. Competition entrants have no chance of winning anything. This is a possible reference to ITV Play late-night call-in shows where very little people actually get through to the show. At peak times callers had a 1 in 8500 chance of getting through to the studio to play but were still charged regardless ("Just dial this number, pay this price and get fuck all! It's called telly. Get used to it!").
2.2	Mr Doovdé calls a travel agents enquiring about flights to the Oosa. He wishes to go to Jufk, Laks and Duhk with Bah.; Terry Tibbs talking to a young lady enquiring about a paddling pool for sale. This is the first time in Fonejacker history Terry makes a call outside of his used cars office, but is instead on a golf course making the call inside a buggy based on a Rolls-Royce. The series 2 trailer shows Terry Tibbs saying "surprise!" during the call, but on the broadcast a picture of a naked statue is shown instead of him. In the call itself Terry asks questions such as if the pool has a motif on it, before suggesting the lady's "Useless husband" is too lazy to install it as the reasons for its sale. He later asks her if she can cook because he can "do with the company", before saying his own wife "Can't cook for fucking shit". He says he's willing to pay £25 or less for it, otherwise he'll go to Argos Express. The lady can't go below 25, so ends the call with his "Goodbye and much love!" farewell before moving off in his buggy.; Ja Fool calls a restaurant to book a table by rapping.; Rodriguez the Cuban head louse calls a school to ask if he and his family can visit, as long as there is no school nurse.; Dufrais Constantinople calls a private investigator to complain he is being investigated. They are on to him and he is on to them (in his mind).; Mr Broadbandings from "Internet Relationship Providings" calls an elderly man with his special offerings. The man qualifies for an over-80s discount. When the man says he is not interested in the end, Mr Broadbandings goes back to the usual Internet Service Providing script, after saying he likes Angelina Jolie, and that his dream would be to "call her in the middle of the night" and show her his "offerings". In the fantasy, her real-life partner Brad Pitt is seen answering the phone.; Brian Bedonde calls a theatre box office to buy tickets, only for his unusual speech impediment to make it difficult for the man at the box office to understand his post code.; Mendoza calls to book a function room to hold an orgy, but finds the evening he wants is double booked with a bingo night.; A woman calling the automated Ticket Line to buy tickets for an Alanis Morissette concert, but the "computer" thinks she wants tickets for Disney on Ice, then Bon Jovi at Wembley Stadium, then Rick Astley at the Dome. The automated service finally "understands" the correct commands, only for the messages spoken to the caller to change speeds from high-pitched to low-pitch, which leads the caller to ask if it's a joke.
2.3	Mr Broadbandings calling from "Internet Relationship Findings", asking a man if he's in a relationship. He says he is, but Mr Broadbandings still urges him to join up, asking him if he wants "a bit on the sidings" - only for the man to threaten to report him to Trading Standards, which influences Mr Broadbandings to offer him a free gift. The man stops his car before the threat, only to be towed away for illegal parking.; The Chinese DVD gang leader telephones a T-shirt printing company, asking if he can have sweatshirts reading "Tommy Hilfiger", "Poro Sport" and caps reading "Giorgio Armani". The man he is talking to informs him they are illegal to sell on the market due to being a registered trademark, to which the Chinese man says he can sell them on the Internet.; The Fonejacker phones a florist, but uses a CD in an electrical shop which plays battleground effects, so it sounds like he's telephoning from the Afghanistan war.; Jimmy Jon is given a call back from a man he telephoned earlier in the day, only to miss the call. When he gets back to him he tells him he is interested in buying a bed he has for sale, only to make sexual references informing the caller what he wants to do with the bed.; Terry Tibbs telephones a funeral director, asking for a small coffin for his wife's dog. The lady he is talking to gets stunned, with Terry asking her if its "A monologue or a twosome?, talk to me!", then says that she's in shock. As he talks about having to pay for "another pooch", and how they'll say goodbye, she starts to crack up laughing. With this, Terry tells her to get a grip on herself, otherwise he'll "Bury the bluddy thing" himself.; Mr Doovdé telephones a hotel, informing the lady on reception that he was in the bar and heard a song. He sings "The Girl from Ipanema" to her using nonsense lyrics. After inviting her workmates to listen to him, she says she cannot recognise the song and puts him through to the bar.; A young Liverpudlian inmate named Stevie telephones for a job to be an au pair, only for the woman to refuse him due to his "guv" asking if he said to her what he's in jail for. The inmate has a tattoo reading "Acckrington Stanley".; The Mouse telephoning a locksmith to free him from a cage in London Zoo, which has a digital timer at the top, in which when it reaches zero, a hatch below him opens and then gets fed to the snakes. He informs the locksmith some of his family have died due to the same reason, only to fall into the snake pit himself while still on the phone. The singer Mika is shown as the zoo keeper in charge of the killings, who named the mouse "lunch".; Janec phones a record shop, applying for the position of keyboard player in a band, only to play sound effects heard on game shows, to indicate a correct and wrong answer due to claiming he "composed" the effects for a fictional show called Kraków 951. He later plays the sound heard on a supermarket tannoy, claiming he composed that also alongside a soundtrack for a murder scene in a Polish film, and the "fasten seatbelt" sound on Polish Airlines.
2.4	The Chinese DVD gang leader phoning an engravers, asking for an Elvis Presley dedication on a Rolex only to attempt to pass it off as genuine at an auction.; An Iraqi man phoning the British Army in an attempt to join them, but is told Iraq is not a commonwealth country.; The Fonejacker phoning a mobile phone left in a clothes shop, and claims to the man who finds it, that he is after a girl called Olga, only to start arguing with the man threatening to "put my foot in your arse".; George Agdgdgwngo phoning a woman, saying he's from ITV and claims that her phone has made many calls totalling 111,103 pounds, to phone vote lines involved in the ITV voting scam. He tries to get her bank details to send the "Rebate Cheque", and then starts making a speech about how important ITV is (while playing Hen Wlad Fy Nhadau as a backing track on a tape player). He then gets back to the point of the call, saying he wants to pay her the monies, and she says it's too good to be true. She creates an idea for Ant and Dec to send the money to her, George then says it can be arranged and will say hello to them for her.; Mr Broadbandings calling from "Internet Relationship Providings", asking a man the usual "Are you in a relationship at the moment?" question. He is interested in signing up, and gives details for the sort of girl he is looking for. Mr Broadbandings then puts his descriptions in a computer which acts like a slot machine, and shouts "I'm finding you datings!" every time he pulls the lever. He says the service is free, but starts the expensive prices announcement. After a while the man's partner is heard in the background telling him to put the phone down.; Donald Donaldson phoning Francis, who is a window cleaner to book an appointment, before talking to him using sexual innuendos, and singing him a tune in the same manner.; Janec phoning a neighbour from his bedsit asking for the Poland football match result, as there is no TV, the man says he is not watching it and Janec asks him to check the other channels. The man says a quiz show is on channel 4, Kraków 951 is played on the TV. Janec then asks him if he and his friends could listen to it. The man refuses as he's watching Coronation Street, Janec again asks to listen but the man refuses and tells him he is going to bed.; A posh man phoning a scrap yard trying to get another man's car scrapped, as the owner has been having sex with his wife. The scrapyard owner refuses to do so as the man does not have the documents, annoyed by this he smashes the window only to set the alarm off, and get assaulted by the man who owns the car.
2.5	A man phoning direct enquires requesting a telephone number, but does not have the address or a name, but still keeps on asking. He later says he is trying to track down his ex-girlfriend.; Stevie phoning an airport applying for a chef job. When he reveals he has a criminal record, the man refuses saying that BAA will not issue an airside pass.; Andrew calling a police station about the appearance of a series of gang members, only to pretend that the line is faulty, so the man on the other end of the line cannot hear the descriptions properly, nor his phone number.; Terry Tibbs phones a man named Anthony, from a fireworks display company, asking how long a display will last. Anthony says it lasts for seven minutes, with Terry asking in reply if they'll be the greatest seven minutes he'll see of fireworks. He then says the display is for a celebration of his divorce, and says he is thinking of having it round his house, his wife's or his father in-law's. Anthony then asks where he lives only to reply "Well, my house!". Terry then asks Anthony who the last person he spoke to was, with it being his girlfriend. Terry then asks him what they spoke about, and tells Terry they talked about sex. Terry then asks if they whispered or spoke loud, before Anthony says they did a bit of both, and then gets back on the subject of the fireworks. After a while Terry ends the call with his "Goodnight and much love!" farewell.; Mr Broadbandings receiving a call from a man, who is enquiring an advert he is running selling two tickets for Dolly Parton. Mr Broadbandings confuses the man by thinking he is after train tickets, and then offering tickets for flights, and Bon Jovi before the man hangs up, saying that he is no longer interested, despite Mr Broadbandings efforts to offer tickets for Take That.; Donald Donaldson phoning an estate agents for the viewing of a house. He asks about the hair colour of the man who does the viewings, before asking for more details of his appearance. Donald then asks in a sexual manner if he would like to spend time with him, only for the man he is talking with to hang up and hold his head in his hands, while the Fonejacker laughs.; Mendoza calls a drummer named Pierre, so he can bang a single drum at an orgy. Despite being offer 15,000 euros, then 30,000 euros, Pierre refuses the offer.; Mr Doovdé calling a local record store and singing nonsense lyrics to the Missy Elliott song "Get Ur Freak On". They also guess the name of the song correctly, after asking him to sing the first part again.; Janec calling a plumbing, gas and building site company for a job, only to give a very long Polish mobile phone number, and mention how many tea breaks he will take in comparison to the British workers (Janec says one, while he also says that he's seen the British take many with biscuits). The woman he is talking to says the workers do not take that many at all, and Janec then says he can be taken on for cheap labour, only for the woman to think he is aiming to compete with the workforce and hang up
2.6	Mr Doovde phoning a direct enquires line, for NCP's telephone number.; Janec phoning a modelling agency, in which he tries to trick the man into thinking he asked him for the time, after giving a height that was below the regulation. He later asks about for bringing his wife and children, and asks for the age limits before giving their ages. He mentions his mother, but the man dismisses this and says she is too tall when Janec says she is 7'2". The man Janec is talking to appears to be looking at Fonejacker clips on YouTube, with George Agdgdgwngo on the screen. Janec also claims to be Ukrainian.; The Fonejacker contacting an Algerian man named Kimahl on his phone, after finding his number on the last calls dialed directory. He says he spoke for 48 minutes, asking what he was speaking to his wife Joanne about, suspecting there is an affair taking place behind his back.; Dufrais calling the Met Office complaining about the weather being forecast incorrectly in a newspaper.; Terry Tibbs enquiring about buying a Hi-Fi cabinet. Terry later asks if she has anything else to sell, which is a Technics Hi-Fi, and a sofa.; Charlie Wong from the Chinese Piracy Gang, receiving a call back from Pathé, in which he is enquiring them to send him some films they have not yet released, pretending to be an employee of the BAFTA DVD department (which does not exist), so he can forward them to the voting panel. He is transferred to another department who does not know of him, and is asked by the other lady to e-mail her to confirm if he works for BAFTA. He later offers her to buy a DVD, only to hang up.; Donald Donaldson contacting a bouncer named Neil and enquires about frisking in a sexual context.; A fat gerbil telephones a fitness centre to lose weight.; A man contacting the automated Ticketline service for musical tickets to We Will Rock You, only for it to think he asked for Disney on Ice, and then on the second attempt it's recognised. The automated service also understands the caller wants two tickets, but on the first attempt instead. However, when the caller asks for upper tier tickets, it thinks he is asking for back of the venue tickets, but the caller says its correct. On the clarification announcement the automated service, says "57, back of venue tickets for The Lion King!", only for the caller to hang up after saying "Fuck you, man!".

== Christmas Specials ==
Christmas Message Aired: December 2006
Christmas Special Aired: 20 December 2007

#	Christmas Specials
Christmas Message	Mr Doovdé calling HMV asking for Christmas Prices for "Poospés"; Brian Bedonde calling a store asking if they sell baubles, only for his unusual speech impediment to make it a little difficult for the man at the store to understand him and think he means bourbon.; George Agdgdgwngo calling a man asking for his bank account details so he and his interior company can redecorate and refurbish the entire bank vault in the theme of Christmas. He soon refuses and hangs up.
Christmas Special	Mike making two calls, one calling from "Wrap a neighbours cat in cling film and throw it down a well Network Solutions Incorporated" asking a woman questions about the three wise men, and the other calling from "Tease your nipples with a Choc ice and whistle something fun Information Technology Services Limited" asking a woman a question about the baby Jesus. The question was "How much did the baby Jesus weigh when he was born?". The woman guesses 7 pounds, and according to Mike she answered the question correctly.; Mr. Broadbandings calling from All-in-One Multimedia Providings trying to offer a man a special Christmas offer including free internet service providings, free satellite dish upgradings, free mobile phones and free home telephonings, with no one-off payments, but the man is not interested, while telling Mr Broadbandings to "Stop talking!" and refusing to believe that the offer is "free for Christmas" believing that there is a catch.; A man calls a David & Goliath store in Carnaby Street asking about buying his daughter some clothes for Christmas whilst doing his job as an announcer at a railway station announcing train times (Kayvan uses a megaphone like before). He even goes as far as to threaten to smack a man around his "fucking face" if he doesn't put his cigarette out.; Terry Tibbs calling a man named Cameron enquiring about a Camper Van. He refuses to take any offer less than £4,200, so Terry sings his offer of £3,700 to convince Cameron but is not interested. Terry then pushes him further and thinks he is watching Neighbours, telling him to switch it off and buy his album How To Do Business With Terry Tibbs.; George Agdgdgwngo calling two victims, one involving a man winning 1,396,822 Ugandan dollars and 86 cents on the "Charitable Telephonic Scratchcard", and the other involving cyber thieves. The first 'victim' seems aware he is being given a prank or hoax call, as he seems aware he has to give a bank account number and sort code even before George requests this from him, and does not seem surprised he has won when George gets a penny to remove the silver panel on the card. The second 'victim' calls George a "fucking lunatic" and "The undesireable" when already being informed of the Cyber Thieves by George labelling them as "undesireables" himself. The man asks George where he is calling from just to amuse him, which makes George look stumped for a few seconds before saying "Solihull!" in a puzzled voice. The man asks him where it is only to reply "It is in the United Kingdom sir!", before saying "In the North!" to which the man replies that it isn't (when in fact it is in the West Midlands).; Mr. Doovde making two calls, one asking the number for Bup (BP), and the other calling a musical instrument store trying to find out the name of a Christmas Carol by singing it with nonsense lyrics, in the same way he sings "West End Girls" by the Pet Shop Boys in the first series.; Brian Betonde calling a store asking if they sell Baubles, only for his unusual speech impediment to make it difficult for the man and woman at the store to understand him.; A man calling the Property Line asking for a one-bed loft conversion in Brighton for £550 per calendar month. The Service thinks he is asking for a two-bedroom house in Borehamwood for £1,380 per calendar month. When he says his request again the service almost gets it right, but thinks he wants £3,920 per calendar month. When he tries saying it for the third time he is told by the service that he has exceeded his messaging limit. He has to choose the Property option again but the service thinks he asked for romance, he hangs up after saying "Fuck off" and the service supposedly malfunctions.

== Previously unseen DVD calls ==
#	Calls featured only on the DVD Releases
Exclusive to the DVD Releases	Series 1 DVD: The Chinese DVD Gang leader Charlie Wong phoning a Chinese takeaway for a supply of Prawn crackers worth two tonnes. When the woman on the phone refuses, she also refuses the amounts of 300 bags down to 25 bags, and angrily tells him that he has to go somewhere else for that amount and hangs up.; The Mouse caught in a mouse trap phoning the vet to see if the vet can save him.; Series 2 DVD: Bijan phones a man to double check his address to deliver pizza to him, but the man says he didn't order pizza.; Brian with his speech impediment asks a shop if they sell "burr".; Brian without his speech impediment asks a wine shop if they sell Chateau Musard, when the reply is "yes" he asks if he has tried it. The man says yes, then Brian asks "Do you do chat-on le floor?" The reply is no and Brian explains how refreshing it was when he tried it.; Jimmy phoning from the juicee juice company to a pub landlord and tries to persuade the landlord to take a sample of his juice, he sells apple, orange, spinach & avocado, ginger and cashew flavoured juice, but he says the walnut flavour should be avoided.
