= Ed Tracy =

British television writer and director

Ed Tracy is a British television writer and television director who collaborated with the comedian Kayvan Novak to create all of the Fonejacker and Facejacker television shows.

Initially working together on Tracy's short film Obscene in 2003, the pair co-created, wrote and directed the pilot episode of Fonejacker in 2005. This working partnership continued across two television series of Fonejacker and two series of Facejacker. Alongside writing and directing, Tracy took a lead role in editing, animation, design, camera, and music composition. The shows were produced by Hat Trick Productions.

Tracy was awarded a British Academy of Film and Television Award for best comedy television programme in 2008 for his work on Fonejacker, and was nominated for a British Academy of Film and Television Award for best television comedy programme in 2011 for his work on Facejacker. Other awards include a Broadcast Award for Best New Programme with Fonejacker, and three Royal Television Society awards for Editing and Design. Both Fonejacker and Facejacker were nominated for Golden Rose of Montreux comedy awards, and Facejacker for an International Emmy Award.

Tracy's previous work includes collaborating with street artist Banksy producing animation for the television show The Antics Roadshow, directing the music video for the Dizzee Rascal song "Flex", and directing two Channel 4 Comedy Lab pilot shows with Paddy McGuinness and Liam Hourican. Tracy also produced and directed a music promo for actor/rapper Riz MC / Riz Ahmed, titled "Dark Hearts".

Tracy wrote and directed the short film CAPTCHA for the British Film Institute and Film4. It was released in 2014, and starred Arthur Darvill, Amy Beth Hayes, Nigel Lindsay, Kayvan Novak, with the voice of Zoë Wanamaker.
