= Fonejacker =

British comedy programme

- Series 1 DVD or 'Doovdé' Cover
- Written by: Ed Tracy; Kayvan Novak
- Directed by: Ed Tracy; Kayvan Novak
- Starring: Kayvan Novak
- Country of origin: United Kingdom
- No. of series: 2
- No. of episodes: 14 + 2 Christmas specials (List of episodes)

Production
- Running time: 23 min per episode
- Production company: Hat Trick Productions

Original release
- Network: E4
- Release: 9 May 2006 – 22 October 2008

Related
- Facejacker

Fonejacker is a British sketch comedy television show aired on E4, featuring prank phone calls made by various characters, all voiced by British-Iranian actor Kayvan Novak. The show debuted in May 2006, with its popularity leading to a full series in 2007.

In 2005, Kayvan Novak and Ed Tracy created, wrote and directed Fonejacker, a prank call show, as part of Channel 4 Comedy Lab. After making the pilot together they were given a Christmas special and a six-part series which began airing in the UK on 5 July 2007 on E4 and lasted 6 episodes. They went on to make a second series which began airing on 17 September 2008 on E4, and started on Channel 4 on 6 November 2008. Kayvan Novak said that he was "not sure there will be a third series of Fonejacker" but despite this, several websites reported in October 2009 that a third series would air in May 2010.

In November 2009, the third series was officially announced, with the news that it would be called "Fonejacker 3D" and feature Kayvan Novak portraying both old and new Fonejacker characters face-to-face in the public domain. Renamed Facejacker, the new show began airing on 16 April 2010.

Fonejacker won the BAFTA award for the "Best Comedy Programme" in 2008. Novak plans to create a film based on the show's characters, and is currently in talks with Film4 and Hat Trick Productions.

== Synopsis ==
The show features a masked prank caller (Kayvan Novak) who phones unsuspecting members of the public under various guises, in an attempt to confuse or 'wind up' the recipient. The audio is accompanied by on-screen imagery, consisting of pictures of people with crudely animated moving mouths, or by undercover filming in which Novak is in a street calling a company nearby, usually from inside a public phone booth or from a rickshaw. Occasionally short videos with actors are used instead of images; examples include a sketch where a man is robbing a bank, or one where men in hazmat suits are removing a pigeon from a bank vault. Novak is always seen wearing a red and white balaclava (black in the pilot) and sunglasses. In a new pilot for series 2, he is seen wearing a woolly hat with the initials G.P.R. and a black Mitre Premier League coat. Although Novak's appearance is not seen as the Fonejacker, he appears during Mr Doovdé's calls as a model advertising various items.

Each episode begins with "fonejack" and the definition, to seize control of a telephone conversation by farce esp. to divert it from reason and logic, usually followed by Novak calling Directory Enquiries as Mr Doovdé on an American pay phone. The rooftop where the pre-title sequence fonejack takes place is on top of Guy's Hospital, in Central London.

The final episode of the first series revealed that Novak does not inform all victims that their calls were pranks. Two separate victims had made contact with Novak for the second time both reporting calls. One called Novak back after being fonejacked by George Agdgdgwngo, where he guised himself as Terry Tibbs, and the second incident occurred when a detective character rang a man informing him of an African scammer (George), and "coincidentally" the man reported a call from George. This also implies that not all calls are broadcast, as the people had not been seen in previous episodes. This was further established when on Soccer AM, Kayvan was interviewed on the show, and revealed that he tried a prank with Kidderminster Harriers in the guise of Terry Tibbs, but as the prank did not work due to the chairman being unavailable, the call was not broadcast.

== Broadcast ==
The show began as a pilot for Comedy Lab, a Channel 4 show that showcases new comic talent, in 2006. After much popularity, it was given a six-part series in October 2006 which was initially intended for broadcast on E4 in April in the following year. It was also given a Christmas special that was broadcast on 25 December 2006 entitled Fonejacker's Christmas Message which was a five-minute short version of the pilot. The end of the show displayed Fonejacker: Coming April 2007 – Don't Pick Up The Phone.

In March, a teaser trailer started to air on Channel 4 and E4, which consisted of clips of the pilot put together into a thirty-second advert, ending with e4.com/fonejacker, which redirected users to the Fonejacker MySpace page. However, for undisclosed reasons, the show was put on hold, and wasn't aired in April. New trailers aired in June which saw the Fonejacker in his own flat performing various calls, and a television tuned into the news reporting "new sightings of the Fonejacker". The advert ended with the catchphrase "Don't Pick Up The Phone" and finished with the same E4 website. This was followed a couple of days after by a newer alternative advert.

Hours before the show's first broadcast, Novak called into Big Brother's Little Brother as Terry Tibbs, talking to contestant Jonathan about distinctive eyebrows. However, there was no mention of Fonejacker as presenter Dermot O'Leary seemed puzzled. As part of the advertising for the show, "Fonejacker Tonight 10.30" was displayed throughout the night under E4's on-screen graphic.

A 2007 Christmas special was broadcast on 20 December 2007 and a second series for 2008 was commissioned.

== DVD releases ==
FoneJacker Series 1: The DVD of the first series of Fonejacker was released on 8 October 2007 and includes features such as behind the scenes, outtakes and character interviews. It also includes the pilot episode and the E4 Christmas Message.

Fonejacker Series 2: The DVD of the second series released on 27 October 2008 and includes an interview with Kayvan Novak, unseen footage, E4 Christmas Special Episode and commentaries.

A "Fonejacker Series 1 and 2" box set has also been released. It was released on the same date as Series 2.

A "Facejacker" series one DVD has been released, boxed with series one and two of "Fonejacker".

=== Release dates ===
DVD Title	Discs	Year	No. of Ep.	DVD release	Notes
DVD Title	Discs	Year	No. of Ep.	Region 2	Notes
Complete Series 1	1	2006–2007	7	8 October 2007	Includes Comedy Lab pilot
Complete Series 2	1	2007–2008	7	27 October 2008	Includes the 2007 Christmas special
Complete Series 1 – 2	2	2006–2008	14	27 October 2008	Includes the Comedy Lab pilot & the 2007 Christmas special

== Other appearances ==
Kayvan Novak had two interviews under the cover of his characters on the night show of Kerrang Radio, and then for what was believed to be a UK first, spoke out of character about various things.

On 6 September 2008, he also appeared on Sky Sports football show Soccer AM.

On 15 September 2008, he appeared on Kiss 100 radio station.

On 13 November 2008 Kayvan Novak appeared on the Channel 4 show 8 out of 10 Cats.

On 28 December 2008, Kayvan as the Fonejacker wearing his trademark balaclava provided on video the answer to a question, regarding Jeremy Clarkson publishing his bank account details in a newspaper, on the Channel 4 show The Big Fat Quiz of the Year.

Kayvan rang into the Big Brother fanzone show (Big Brother's Little Brother) in 2007 portraying his character of Terry Tibbs.

In 2010, Fonejacker took part in Channel 4's Comedy Gala, a benefit show held in aid of Great Ormond Street Children's Hospital, filmed live at the O2 Arena in London on 30 March.

On 6 May 2010, during Channel 4's Alternative Election Night, a series of Fonejacker clips were made for the show, mainly his Sajnu character phoning people on who they would like to vote for or trying to get them to vote for a party.

As of June 17, 2021 Fonejacker returned in the form of a podcast featuring all new prank calls, bringing back Kayvan's classic characters such as Terry Tibbs, Brian Badonde and Irish Mike. The initial release included 8 episodes, each running 10–14 minutes long.

== Characters ==
There are many characters on Fonejacker, some who make multiple appearances. Below is a list of the characters that have appeared on the show so far:

=== Recurring cast ===
- Mr Doovdé is a camel riding aficionado of electrical goods who constantly misinterprets initialisms as acronyms, believing that they represent how the terms are pronounced and not spelt, e.g. 'Hoomv' (HMV), 'Doovdé' (DVD), 'Joovc' (JVC), 'Poospé' (PSP), 'USBÉ' (USB) and 'bosom' (BSM). He is completely oblivious to the confusion he causes as a result of this. At the beginning of most episodes, he phones Directory Enquiries and asks for places in the same way as he does for the electrical goods. Examples that have been shown so far are: 'Duhfs' (DFS), 'Pük World' (PC World) and 'Doovlah' (DVLA). In the E4 Christmas Message, he asks about putting the 'hututupuh' (http) and woo.hoomv.co.uhk (www.hmv.co.uk). As he tells the sales people what he wants, Japanese, Indian or Bollywood-style adverts appear on screen that features Kayvan Novak himself. He appears to be riding his camel in front of inner-city Jerusalem. On some occasions he has also been used to phone various places asking the name of a tune (e.g., phoning a hotel to ask what music was played in the bar). He then sings the tune to the person on the phone, though due to his accent the tune sounds like an Arabian song. These segments are done using live action and a hidden camera, as opposed to animation like when he phones direct inquiries or stores.
  First appearance: Comedy Lab pilot
- George Agdgdgwngo (pronounced Ag-dug-a-dug-gwengo) is a very polite Ugandan scammer. He opens nearly every conversation with "Goooooood afternoon sir/madame!" and tries to trick people into believing that all electronically stored bank account money in fact physically exists in personal vaults. He tries to obtain people's bank account details in a variety of ways, such as needing the details to obtain access to a bank vault due to it being steam cleaned or decorated for Christmas, a man suffering cardiac arrest inside, or to remove a pigeon infected with bird flu. He claims to be a representative of several companies including Money Removal Plc, Bank Festive Redistribution Plc, Eastern Union Money Transfer (a word play on Western Union, often used by scammers) and British Gas. He is usually unsuccessful in obtaining people's details, believing one man's sort code was "fuck off". One man did give a number, although it transpired he was reading yesterday's lottery numbers out of a newspaper and the answer to his security question was "Jimmy Savile", who he claimed was his uncle. Another method George uses is to tell people they have won a cash prize or CPM aka "Cash Prize Monies!" that needs to be transferred to their bank account, but it is always a very small sum of money. George often quotes the amount in Ugandan dollars before converting to sterling on his vintage computer, which is next to a photo of Chris Eubank, although this was later replaced with Robert Mugabe along with George being pictured inside a security hut wearing a suit as opposed to an African hair salon wearing traditional African dress. The fictional 'Ugandan dollar' supposedly trades at about Ug$4,900 to £1 sterling (the genuine currency of Uganda, the Ugandan shilling, has a similar exchange rate). He usually opens with the line "Goooooood morning/afternoon/evening sir/madame!" regardless of who answers the phone or time of day. He is wanted by the Zimbabwe telephone fraud prevention unit. When asked by a victim how the money he has been rebated will be sent to them, he explains that it is transferred electronically ("wired") to them directly by his cousin Benson. Benson is portrayed by a real actor when he appears on-screen, whereas George himself is an animated illustration (although a live-action version of George when he was a child in the early 1980s has been shown). He is apparently 6′4″ in Detective Horace Van Khute's telephone identity parade.
  First appearance: Comedy Lab pilot
- Mr Miggins is a confused OAP who made his début asking about a Genie who popped out of a brass lamp, whose appearance has now changed, and is now as confused as the person on the other end of the phone line. In episode 6, it is revealed Mr Miggins' first name is Michael. He is not seen in Series 2.
  First appearance: Comedy Lab pilot
- Brian Badonde is a man who has a speech impediment where everything he says ends up starting with the letter 'B'. His accent is similar to that of art critic Brian Sewell. The impediment is prevented if Brian takes medication. Brian has made a call before without his speech affecting the call, when he rang a restaurant to ask about his blind date. It was also revealed that Brian is in fact homosexual in the same call. His appearance is revealed on Facejacker.
  First appearance: 2006 Christmas Message
- Donald Donaldson is a posh sounding bisexual gentleman who phones hotel receptions and security guards asking for sexual favours from males. He does have a wife and believes she is cheating on him. He is believed to enjoy champagne, nibbles, and 'fucking like rabbits'.
  First appearance: Series 1
- Terry Tibbs is a car salesman who calls various sellers about items on offer, and drives a hard bargain. He is a caricature of Cockney Geezers, and an ageing Spiv. He begins his phone calls with a description of the item in question, and then uses his catchphrase "talk to me" e.g. "Italian Fireplaces, talk to me". He never actually makes a deal, as he often ends his phone calls with a low offer and "Thank you and goodnight – much love", although sometimes he makes an extremely high offer, confusing the person he is talking to. He can often be heard between and during sketches saying other catchphrases such as: "She's a feisty one isn't she", "That's why they call me Terry Tibbs", "Beautiful Car, Beautiful", "Do something for fuck's sake!!" and "Hang about love". Items he has tried to buy include wooden ladders for Russian gentlemen and Maserati 3200s. It is indicated at one point that George Agdgdgwngo is his security guard. In many of Terry's phone calls, he usually mentions Siberia. During the calls themselves a series of pictures appear connected to what Terry is talking about. He is apparently only 5'0" in Detective Horace Von Khute's telephone identity parade.
  First appearance: series 1 episode 1
- The Mouse is a smart rodent who requires the regular help from local services, such as a vet because he's been poisoned after eating some cheese with green powder on it, or an exterminator to take care of a cat that ate his mother, father, brother and his cousin from the country. He is also an Oasis tribute artist playing on northbound platform 4 of Oxford Circus tube station and treats cheese as if it were pornography. At the end of every one of his sketches, he dies or it is implied that he will die.
  First appearance: series 1 episode 1
- Jafool alias (pronounced Jafooly) or The Beatboxer is a man who phones a company or shop and beatboxes to give details, confusing the 'victim'. These pranks are done using a hidden camera instead of animation.
  First appearance: series 1 episode 1
- Sajnu alias, ISP Man or Mr Broadbandings is an Indian man who works in a call centre in India for Internet Service Providings, a highly priced ISP that promises "42 megabytings" data speed and "a better dealings than your current dealings". He also works for Mobile Network Providings, Digital Multichannel Receivings and Internet Relationship Findings. His main excuse for his persistence is "I got family to feed." In the third episode of Season 2, he reveals that his name is Sajnu.
  First appearance: series 1 episode 1
- Mike is a Northern Irish tele-salesman who calls on the behalf of rudely named companies asking the victim questions about things such as their personal life or the tragic plight of the wrinkled ball sack. An example of his made up companies is "Good afternoon, sir, my name's Mike and I'm calling from 'wet look gel your crotch and make a quiff with your pubes IT recruitments limited', can I ask a few questions about your love life?"
  First appearance: series 1 episode 1
- The Flat/Ticket Line is an 'automated' service for people wanting to buy or rent properties around the country. Callers are usually unsuccessful in their efforts as the service selects the incorrect properties. At the start of the conversation, the 'automated' service will usually make a 'beep' to allow the caller to speak, but towards the end of conversations, delays the beep until the person actually speaks, forcing them into repeating the same word. One person did manage to select the correct property, only to have the service malfunction totally, saying it has been rented. This is the only time people have phoned the Fonejacker, rather than the other way around, aside from Episode Six of Series 1 where Terry Tibbs was seen to receive a phone call. The photo of the Flat Line representative is Hollywood film actor James Mason, the voice also bears a striking similarity. The fictional service, has twice been selling tickets under the name 'Ticket Line'.
  First appearance as the Flat Line: series 1 episode 1
  First appearance as the Ticket Line: series 2 episode 2
- The Chinese DVD Gang are a group of illegal, obese Chinese students who attempt to film films in cinemas and sell as DVDs. Their leader, Charlie Wong is the only member of the gang that speaks on the phone. He often says "You want buy DVD?". One of the members of the gang also claimed to be a Chinese Samuel L. Jackson lookalike.
  First appearance: series 1 episode 2
- The Manager is the head of the Indian telesales companies Internet Service Providings and Mobile Network Providings. He only appears if the victims Mr Broadbandings calls, request to be put through to him if they are not happy with Mr Broadbandings' actions. He is always seen in his office, in which the Taj Mahal can be seen though the window behind him. While talking to the customer, a series of adverts appear based on the company in the same way with Mr Broadbandings. He believes that 'The customer is not right, he is talking bloody bollocks'. He is not involved in any of Mr Broadbandings' calls in Series 2.
  First appearance: series 1 episode 3
- Criminal Dave is a bank robber who usually has quite large serious flaws in his plans. For example, he attempts to schedule a get-away in a minicab and to arrange for a locksmith to open the bank's safe. He is not seen in Series 2.
  First appearance: series 1 episode 3
- Detective Horace Von Khute is a telephone fraud prevention officer from Zimbabwe, and is known to ask victims questions pertaining to a previous prank call. He speaks in a gravelly, hushed South African tone, it appears his native language is Afrikaans as he typically says "ja" instead of "yes". Detective Horace has an unusually long telephone number, making it hard to give and confirm that it is correct. His office uses an assortment of old, outdated equipment to track fraudsters. His most wanted criminal is George Agdgdgwngo. He is not seen in Series 2.
  First appearance: series 1 episode 5
- Dufrais Constantinople is a complaining Jewish man (he is sometimes pictured wearing a yarmulke) who calls an electric fence company to ask if it will stop the kids from next door from kicking the ball into his garden; he also calls a P.I and asks why he is being followed only to enter into argument, and also the Met Office about an incorrect newspaper report of the weather. He gives his name in two of his three calls, by spelling it out using words by saying "D for Donald, U for up, F for Friday, R for raspberry, A for ah, I for is and S for stratosphere", with D once being for 'Derrick'. He always struggles to find a word starting with S, claiming his mind has gone blank.
  First appearance: series 2 episode 1
- Mendoza is a Russian man, who phones people who he wants to hire in order to hold an orgy, which he does not reveal at first to the "victims", until later on. He calls the orgies 'an event' beforehand, always has a drummer present, and people wearing masks.
  First appearance: series 2 episode 2
- Steve a young scouse male, with a remarkable similarity to Steven Gerrard, who phones from a prison about different jobs, such as babysitting or as a chef at an airport restaurant, stating he has experience with the jobs such as caring for his drug addict sisters children and cooking in the prison kitchen.
  First appearance: series 2 episode 3
- Janec is a Polish man who has moved from his homeland of Poland to Glasgow in Scotland, and lives in a bedsit with his other friends also from his homeland. Janec makes many calls applying for jobs, and once rang up a neighbour asking him to leave his phone near his TV, so they can hear it 'like a radio', as they do not have one themselves. He was commissioned to create the sound effects for a fictional Polish game show, supermarket announcement tannoys, the fasten seatbelt tone on Polish airlines and action scene music for a film, with all these played on a "Poland" keyboard. He once called a modelling agency asking to be a model. In that episode, he refers to himself being Ukrainian, despite saying he recorded music for a Polish game show. Like Horace Von Khute, he gave out an unusually very long telephone number in one of his calls.
  First appearance: series 2 episode 3

=== One-off ===
- Alan A man who called a rickshaw driver to pick him up from terminal 4 of Heathrow airport.
  Appearance: Comedy Lab pilot
- Man with a broken tooth style of talking (name unknown) is a man asking to see a dentist, but then unknown to the receptionist he asks to perform some love acts on her, but she thinks he is still making an appointment. The Fonejacker had his mouth full whilst making this call.
  Appearance: Comedy Lab pilot
- Jéan-Pierre is a French man phoning a Car Company to put a deposit on a Rolls-Royce Phantom, only to have phone problems while he reveals his details. He calls back later in the same episode, but has problems again.
  Appearances: Comedy Lab pilot
- Welsh Man (name unknown) A man with a Welsh accent claiming to have lost both of his thumbs in a freak baking accident calling a mobile phone shop to enquire about the best mobile phone for him.
  Appearance: series 1 episode 1
- Roger Barker is a posh English man with telephone problems who attempts to buy a Bentley.
  Appearance: series 1 episode 3
- BT Engineer (Tarquin) A BT engineer calling a book shop checking to see if their phone line is 'crackly' (the Fonejacker is actually crumpling a piece of paper next to the phone).
  Appearance: series 1 episode 4
- Oliver Sloam A Polish handyman who charges £30 an hour to change a lightbulb. When in Series 1 Episode 4 Oliver dropped some coleslaw on his £300 suit he threw it away to avoid washing it.
  Appearance: series 1 episode 4
- Bijan is an Iranian man who is seen riding a motorbike. He called a paparazzi service whilst chasing David Beckham and offered pictures and videos of him, only to crash during the call.
  Appearance: series 1 episode 4
- Vishka Vishkovski is a Russian circus act whose act involves an 'amazing dancing bear on the hot coals'. He phones up a circus agency to ask for a job, often repeating his name and act several times.
  Appearance: series 1 episode 5
- Hospitalised Man (name unknown) A hospitalised man on a breathing machine calling a company for life insurance, only to die during the call.

Appearance: series 1 episode 6

- Restaurant owner An Italian restaurant owner calling a phone that supposedly belongs to a waiter named Antonio, it is answered by a man who found it in his dustcart, the Restaurant owner asks why he is late for work.

Appearance: series 2 episode 1

- Stanley is a young boy who phoned a model shop from his school, asking the shop for "Hornby Railways" train sets and figures, some of which do not exist, for example: "Depwessed people who stand on the twack waiting to be killed".
  Appearance: series 2 episode 1
- Barry Childs is a man who is a chief executive in the 'Young Offenders Institute' trying to book a magic act. Initially the act sounds keen until he learns that his close contact magic will be likely to provoke a violent response from the offenders, and that several previous bookings (including clown) were assaulted, after which the act politely declines.
  Appearance: series 2 episode 1
- Rodriguez A Cuban hair louse who calls a school and asks if there is a school nurse who checks the children for lice.
  Appearance: series 2 episode 2
- Dan A soldier phoning a florist in order to buy some flowers. Just as he is reading out what he would like on the card the Fonejacker plays a CD of battle sound effects to make it seem like he is phoning from the Afghanistan War
  Appearance: series 2 episode 3
- Jimmy Jon is a bisexual Australian man who is given a call back from a man he telephoned earlier in the day, only to miss the call. When he gets back to him he tells him he is interested in buying a bed he has for sale, only to make sexual references informing the caller what he wants to do with the bed.
  Appearance: series 2 episode 3
- Steve's Guv is a man who Steve, when calling about an au pair position, passes the phone onto. He has a talk with the woman Steve was talking to, and later tells him he did not get the position.
  Appearance: series 2 episode 3
- Ali is an Iraqi man phoning the British Army in an attempt to join them, but is told Iraq is not a commonwealth country.
  Appearance: series 2 episode 4
- Posh Man (Name unknown) A posh man phoning a scrap yard trying to get another man's car scrapped, as the owner has been having sex with his wife.
  Appearance: series 2 episode 4
- Scottish Man (Name unknown) A man phoning directory inquiries requesting a telephone number to try and track down his ex-girlfriend.
  Appearance: series 2 episode 5
- Andrew is a character who phoned a police office to report a criminal gang. As he tries to describe the gang members, he is very similar to Roger Barker in terms of telephone problems.
  Appearance: series 2 episode 5
- The Gerbil an overweight rodent with a Scottish accent. He looks and sounds quite similar to the Mouse but survives his sketch.
  Appearance: series 2 episode 6
- Jimmy is a Guatemalan man working for the "Juicee Juice Company". He is not seen in any of the episodes, but is seen on the Series 1 DVD cover on the bottom between Bijan and Mr Miggins. His only call can be found on the Unseen Material section of the Series 2 DVD. This is the only character so far to have been seen only on a Fonejacker DVD release and not in the actual Series itself.
- Mrs Millins is an OAP who phones a corner shop, claiming to be the head of the Neighbourhood Watch Scheme. She tells the owner that there is a man walking a cat on a lead and to keep a look out for him. The male owner later calls her a "lunatic" a few times, says he is the one walking the cat and eventually hangs up when Mrs Millins apologises for making the call. She is the first character since Jimmy not to appear on the main series.
  Appearance: One-off prank call titled "Walking the Cat" as part of Channel 4's "Funny Fortnight". Screened on 22 August 2012.

== Episodes ==
The first standalone series started on 5 July 2007. Due to its popularity, it was repeated on Channel 4 from 7 September 2007. A Christmas Special was then aired on 20 December 2007, with a second series airing from 18 September – 22 October 2008.

== References and notes ==
General

- "Fonejacker". E4. Archived from the original on 15 September 2008.

Specific
