= Kayvan Novak =

British actor (born 1978)

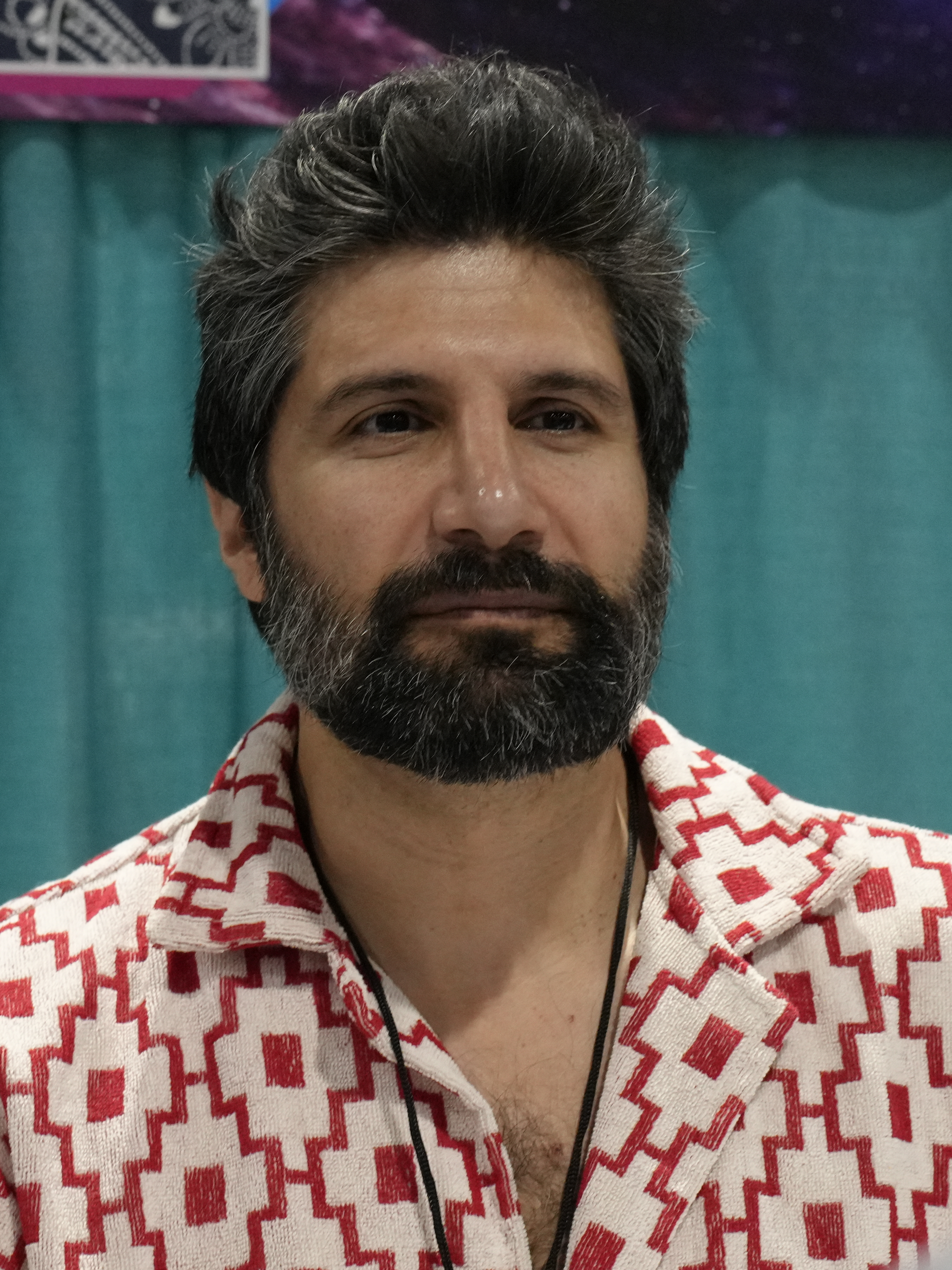
- Novak at GalaxyCon Richmond in 2025
- Born: 23 November 1978 (age 47); London, England
- Occupations: Actor; comedian
- Years active: 2002–present
- Spouse: Talitha Stone

Comedy career
- Medium: Television; film
- Genres: Character comedy; satire; sketch comedy
- Subject: Practical jokes

Kayvan Novak (born 23 November 1978) is a British actor and comedian. He co-created and starred in the comedy series Fonejacker (2006–2008) and Facejacker (2010–2012), winning the BAFTA Television Award for Best Comedy (Programme or Series) in 2008.

He is best known for his role as the vampire Nandor the Relentless in the mockumentary series What We Do in the Shadows (2019–2024). He also portrayed Waj in the comedy film Four Lions (2010) and Fabian Kingsworth in the animated sitcom Archer (2020–2023).

== Early life ==
Novak was born in London to Iranian parents. He was educated at Highgate School and the Fine Arts College in Hampstead, before attending the Webber Douglas Academy of Dramatic Art.

== Career ==
Novak initially appeared on various British shows, including Family Affairs, Holby City, and Spooks. In 2005, he and Ed Tracy created Fonejacker, a prank call show as part of Channel 4's Comedy Lab strand. After the pilot, he was given a Christmas special and a six-part series, which began airing on 5 July 2007 on E4; and 7 September 2007 on Channel 4. In November 2009, he appeared on the Channel 4 show The Increasingly Poor Decisions of Todd Margaret, playing a bomb-disposal officer. In April 2010, Novak began appearing in a spin-off of Fonejacker called Facejacker, in which he adopted various disguises, including several characters heard in Fonejacker. Novak announced on BBC Radio 1 in May 2012 that the character Terry Tibbs, a mainstay of both shows, would be getting a spin-off chat show; this aired in August 2012. Novak played Simon in the Channel 4 sitcom pilot Bad Sugar.

Novak filmed a scene for This Is England '86 which was cut from the final broadcast, but appears in the DVD extras. He was also one of the main characters in the television show Sirens, which began on 27 June 2011 on Channel 4 in the UK. Novak also featured in two episodes of Phone Shop, the first in Series 1, titled "The First Temptation of Chris", and the second in Series 2, titled "Revenge of the Razz". He played area manager Razz Prince. In addition to acting, Novak has made appearances as himself on shows Soccer AM, 8 out of 10 Cats, Celebrity Big Brother's Little Brother, and Never Mind the Buzzcocks.

Novak appeared as an intelligence officer in the Academy Award-winning film Syriana. In 2008, he appeared in micro-budget B-movie The Blue Tower. He also appeared in the 2010 comedy Four Lions, in which he played the dim-witted Waj, a role for which he won the award for Best Comedy Performance in a British Film at the 2010 British Comedy Awards, beating fellow actor Nigel Lindsay, who was nominated for his role in the same film.

Novak appeared as Alok in the first series of BBC Radio 4 comedy Fags, Mags and Bags. He has provided voice work for three video games: Wallace & Gromit: The Curse of the Were-Rabbit, Perfect Dark Zero and Kameo. He also voiced various characters in the ITV spoof sketch show Headcases, and in the 2012 Channel 4 animated series Full English. He lent his vocals to British band Beady Eye's 2013 song "Flick of the Finger".

In 2013, he appeared as Effy Stonem's boss in the Skins episode "Skins Fire". He voiced a Cyberman head called Handles in the Doctor Who 2013 Christmas special "The Time of the Doctor". He had a starring role in the last episode of the first series of Uncle as Mo, the boss of a fictional record label. In 2014, he played Paul in the second episode ("A Quiet Night In") of Inside No. 9. Also in 2014, he appeared in Episode 1, Series 3 of Rev. as the Imam, Yussef Hasan.

Since 2015, he has voiced the character of Brains in the revived ITV series Thunderbirds Are Go. In 2015, he featured in the sitcom Asylum as "Rafael". In May 2015, he appeared in a new comedy series called SunTrap on BBC1. In May 2017, Novak appeared in Channel 4's Britain Today, Tonight.

In 2019, Novak was cast as the vampire Nandor The Relentless in the mockumentary comedy horror television series What We Do In The Shadows. The show is based on the 2014 film of the same name.

Novak speaks fluent Persian, as seen on the second episode of Season 2 (“Ghosts”) of What We Do in the Shadows.

In 2021, he released eight episodes of "All New Fonejacker Podcast" on Audible and starred as Roger in Disney's Cruella.

== Filmography ==
=== Film ===
Year	Title	Role	Notes
2005	Syriana	Arash	
2010	A Turtle's Tale: Sammy's Adventures	Fluffy (voice)	
2010	Four Lions	Waj	
2014	Cuban Fury	Bejan	
2014	Captcha	Clarence	Short film
2014	The Last Sparks of Sundown	Seven	
2014	Paddington	Grant the Animal Supplier	
2016	Prevenge	Tom	
2018	Early Man	Dino, Jurgend (voice)	
2019	The Day Shall Come	Reza	
2019	Men in Black: International	Vungus, Nasr, Bassam	
2021	Cruella	Roger Dearly	

=== Television ===
Year	Title	Role	Notes
2002	The American Embassy	Ahmed Rallah	Episode: "China Cup"
2002	Judge John Deed	Ali Abdul Moncheri	Episode: "Political Expediency"
2002	Family Affairs	Amir Sadati	1 episode
2003	Trial & Retribution	Craig Board	2 episodes
2004	Holby City	Reza Abbassi	5 episodes
2004	Spooks	Sevilin Ozal	1 episode (uncredited)
2004	A Line in the Sand	Vahid	TV movie
2004	She's Gone	Arto Fazouk	TV movie
2005	Murphy's Law	Masud	Episode: "Boy's Night Out"
2005	The Government Inspector	Qasim Hamdani	TV movie
2006	Comedy Lab	Fonejacker	1 episode (voice)
2007	Be More Ethnic	Ranjit Pradesh	TV movie
2007–2008	Fonejacker	The Fonejacker	Main cast; 13 episodes BAFTA Television Award for Best Comedy (Programme or Series) in 2008
2008	Headcases	Various roles	1 episode (voice)
2008	The Big Fat Quiz of the Year	The Fonejacker	
2009	Comedy Showcase	Bomb Disposal Officer	1 episode
2010	The Increasingly Poor Decisions of Todd Margaret	Bomb Disposal Officer	Episode: "In Which Claims Are Made and a Journey Ensues"
2010	Channel 4's Comedy Gala	Terry Tibbs	
2010–2011	PhoneShop	Razz Prince	2 episodes
2010–2012	Facejacker	Terry Tibbs, various characters	Main cast; 7 episodes
2011	Sirens	Rachid Mansaur	Main cast; 6 episodes
2012	Hacks	Rav	TV movie
2012	Verry Terry	Terry Tibbs (Host)	TV movie
2012	Bad Sugar	Simon	TV movie
2012	Full English	Dusty Johnson, Jason Johnson, Squidge	Main cast
2013	10 O'Clock Live	Pat Putterson	3 episodes
2013	Skins	Jake Abbasi	Series 7, episodes 1–2, "Fire"
2013	Doctor Who	Handles	Episode: "The Time of the Doctor"
2013	Homeboys	Sergio	TV movie
2014	Inside No. 9	Paul	Episode: "A Quiet Night In"
2014	Uncle	Mo	Episode: "Nephew"
2014	Rev.	Yussef Hasan	1 episode
2014	Puppy Love	Phil Evans	1 episode
2014	Walter	DS Mike Minorsky	TV movie
2015–2020	Thunderbirds Are Go	Brains, Ned Tedford	Main cast; 21 episodes
2015–2019	Danger Mouse	Dr Loo-cifer, Isambard King Kong Brunel	Recurring role
2015	Asylum	Rafael & Creator	3 episodes
2015	SunTrap	Woody	6 episodes
2015	Top Coppers	Gerard Cliché	1 episode
2016	Counterfeit Cat	Betty, Throckmorton, various characters	
2017	Quacks	Kapoor	Episode: "The Mesmerist"
2017	Britain Today, Tonight	Various characters	
2019–2024	What We Do in the Shadows	Nandor the Relentless	Main cast
2019	A Christmas Carol	Ali Baba	Miniseries
2020	Robot Chicken	Albus Dumbledore, Native American (voice)	Episode: "Max Caenen in: Why Would He Know If His Mother's A Size Queen"
2020–2023	Archer	Rex, Fabian Kingsworth (voice)	13 episodes
2021	Mickey Mouse Funhouse	Trolland the Troll (voice)	2 episodes
2022	Toast of Tinseltown	Des Wigwam	Episode: "Anger Man"
2025	StuGo	Thurstavius "Thurst" Brinkman Throop (voice)	Episode: "Unquenchable Thurst"
2025	Krapopolis	Man O'Horse (voice)	Episode: "Love Week"

=== Video games ===
Year	Title	Role	Notes
2005	Wallace & Gromit: The Curse of the Were-Rabbit	Lord Victor Quartermaine	
2005	Kameo	Additional voices	
2005	Perfect Dark Zero	Additional voice talent	
2008	Haze	Additional voice talent	
