= Flight of the Conchords discography =

Band discography

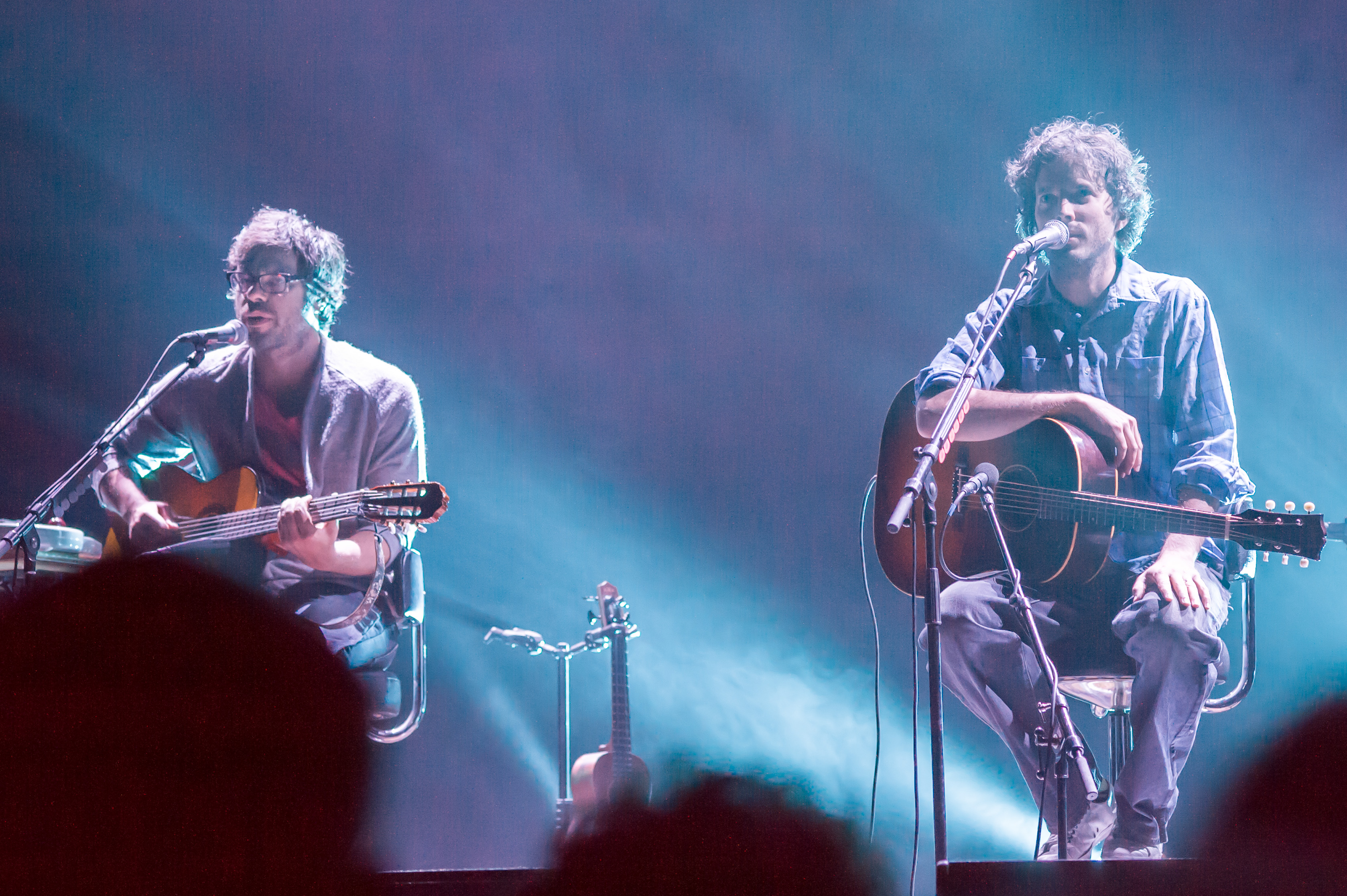
- Jemaine Clement (left) and Bret McKenzie (right) performing in 2010.
- Studio albums: 2
- EPs: 1
- Live albums: 2
- Compilation albums: 2
- Singles: 7
- Music videos: 11

The discography of Flight of the Conchords, a New Zealand-based comedy band, consists of two studio albums, one live album, two compilation albums, one extended play (EP) and seven singles. Jemaine Clement and Bret McKenzie formed Flight of the Conchords in Wellington in 1998. Their first release was the live album Folk the World Tour, which the duo self-released in 2002. In 2006, the band signed with American independent label Sub Pop; they released the EP The Distant Future the following year, which reached number eight in New Zealand.

Clement and McKenzie began starring in the Flight of the Conchords TV series on HBO in June 2007. After the conclusion of the first season of the show, the band's self-titled debut full-length album was released in April 2008, which topped the New Zealand Albums Chart and reached number three on the US Billboard 200. Similarly, following the conclusion of the show's second season, I Told You I Was Freaky was released in October 2009, reaching the top ten in New Zealand and the top 20 in the US. The lead single from the album, "Hurt Feelings", became the band's first to chart when it reached number 36 on the New Zealand Singles Chart.

Flight of the Conchords returned in 2012 with the release of "Feel Inside (And Stuff Like That)", a charity single recorded to benefit the New Zealand children's charity Cure Kids. The single topped the New Zealand Singles Chart. The compilation album The Complete Collection, featuring The Distant Future, Flight of the Conchords, I Told You I Was Freaky and "Pencils in the Wind", was released in 2013. Their live album, Live in London, was released in March 2019.

== Albums ==
=== Studio albums ===
List of studio albums, with selected chart positions and certifications
Title	Album details	Peak chart positions										Certifications
Title	Album details	NZ	AUS	UK	US	US Alt.	US Com.	US Dig.	US Indie.	US Rock	US Taste.	Certifications
Flight of the Conchords	Released: 21 April 2008; Label: Sub Pop (#715); Formats: CD, LP, DL	1	37	32	3	1	1	3	1	1	2	RMNZ: 2× Platinum; RIAA: Gold
I Told You I Was Freaky	Released: 20 October 2009; Label: Sub Pop (#800); Formats: CD, LP, DL	7	69	47	19	4	1	8	4	6	2	

=== Live albums ===
List of live albums
Title	Album details	Peak chart positions
Title	Album details	UK
Folk the World Tour	Released: 14 November 2002; Label: self-released (FLIGHT01); Format: CD	—
Live in London	Released: 8 March 2019; Label: Sub Pop (#1275); Formats: 2CD, 3LP, DL	71

=== Compilation albums ===
List of compilation albums
Title	Album details
The Complete Radio Series	Released: 2006; Label: BBC Audiobooks (1846 070708); Format: 3CD
The Complete Collection	Released: 9 July 2013; Label: Sub Pop; Format: DL

== Extended plays ==
List of extended plays, with selected chart positions
Title	EP details	Peak chart positions					
Title	EP details	NZ	US	US Com.	US Dig.	US Heat.	US Indie.
The Distant Future	Released: 7 August 2007; Label: Sub Pop (#746); Format: CD	8	116	1	136	1	11

== Singles ==
List of singles, with selected chart positions, showing year released and album name
Title	Year	Peak positions			Album
Title	Year	NZ	NZ. Digi.	US Com. Digi.	Album
"Business Time"	2008	—	—	25	Flight of the Conchords
"Ladies of the World"	2008	—	—	—	Flight of the Conchords
"Hurt Feelings"	2009	36	—	—	I Told You I Was Freaky
"We're Both in Love with a Sexy Lady"	2009	—	—	—	I Told You I Was Freaky
"Carol Brown"	2009	—	—	—	I Told You I Was Freaky
"Pencils in the Wind"	2009	—	—	—	Non-album single
"Feel Inside (And Stuff Like That)"	2012	1	1	14	Non-album single
"—" denotes a release that did not chart in that territory.

== Other charted songs ==
List of songs, with selected chart positions, showing year released and album name
Title	Year	Peaks	Album
Title	Year	US Com. Digi.	Album
"Hiphopopotamus vs. Rhymenoceros"	2008	21	Flight of the Conchords
