= Moana Leota =

- Also known as: MOZIE
- Born: February 7, 1999 (age 27); Wairarapa, New Zealand
- Genres: Soul, RnB
- Occupations: Singer, Songwriter, Actor, Artist, Vocalist

Moana Leota a.k.a. MOZIE (born February 7, 1999) is a singer-songwriter, actor and vocalist of Samoan and New Zealand European descent based in Wellington, New Zealand. Leota has been performing in New Zealand's commercial, arts and music industries from a young age. She was the voice of the Interislander ad (2013) for a decade and has been an active soloist for community and national events as well as a backing vocalist for national and international touring artists. As an actor, Leota toured internationally to the US and Mexico with Le Moana Productions as the lead in Fatu Na Toto and as a vocalist (2014, 2016, 2018). She recently toured New Zealand, UK and US with Bret McKenzie as a backing vocalist for his most recent album.

Under her stage name MOZIE, Leota released her debut single Not Done Loving (2022), and was praised for her original Soul / RnB sound. Leota received funding for a second single through NZ On Air's Pasifika Music Single funding grants.

== Early life ==
Born in Wellington in 1999, Leota grew up in a family of strong singers in the Wairarapa. Her father is Samoan and her mother, an artist, is New Zealand European. Her early musical influences were Lauryn Hill, The Fugees, Sinead O'Connor, and her own mother and aunts.

Leota was a returning solo act for the Sarah Lilli Family Concert (2010, 2012.) She was also a returning soloist for the annual Christmas Carols show held at the Government House (2014, 2015.) Her first professional work was as the voice of the Interislander ad (2013) which ran for 10 years. Leota recorded the jingle when she was 11. She went onto lend her voice to Tip Top Real New Zealand Summer Commercial (2013) that same year.

Moana Takes Flight (2014) was a fundraising concert initiated by 13-year-old Leota to raise money to visit her grandparents in Malawi with the plan of giving out 10 ukuleles to local children and teaching them to play. The concert featured Leota, Little Bushman, Warren Maxwell and Wellington International Ukulele Orchestras Steve Jessup. Leota herself learned to play the ukulele by watching YouTube on the family computer and joining her community ukulele group, with a majority of elderly attendees, at the age of 10. In the end, she took 30 ukuleles to Malawi and gave them out to the village children of the Nyika Plateau.

Fatu Na Toto (2014) was Leota's first live theatre role in which she was the lead. The live theatre show was a Le Moana Production directed by Tupe Lualua. The show was first performed at the Wellington Fringe Festival. Leota would go on to work for Le Moana Productions throughout her youth as an actor, vocalist and team member going on tour nationally and internationally. Leota and Le Moana took Fatu Na Toto to the Tempo Dance Festival (2016), San Diego International Fringe Festival (2018) and throughout the US and Mexico (2018).

== Education ==
Leota moved back to Wellington, New Zealand to study commercial music at Massey University (2018), where she met and started writing music with her long-time collaborator, Hunter Paranihi. After a year studying commercial music both Leota and Paranihi decided that a change of course was needed to explore their artistry in depth. Both found courses at Te Auaha in 2019, Leota began her study into the Musical Theatre course and Parahini went into the Music course. There she gained a diploma in Performing Arts and in her further studies gained a Bachelor in Creativity (2020.) While at Te Auaha Leota and Paranihi continued to write and collaborate together producing work Leota is very proud, including work on her debut single Not Done Loving (2022.). Moreover, during her time at Te Auaha Leota acted in two productions. She played Pepper Walker in Cry Baby (2019) and Judas in Jesus Christ Superstar (2020).

Leota's show Poets Before Me was created for her 3rd year Body of Work which was her final and largest assignment at university. The show celebrated the poetry of highly acclaimed songs like Hallelujah, A Deal with God by Kate Bush, River by Joni Mitchell as well as some of Leota's original work. Through this Leota explores how selected artists and their poetry have influenced her life and her artistic practice as a singer-songwriter. Her band for the show consisted of Leonardo Coghini on Keys, Seth Boy on Double Bass, Sam Mackenzie on Drums and Emily Paterson on Cello.

== Career ==
Leota was a backing vocalist for Ella Monnery's concert, Powerhouse (2019) and was the solo vocalist for New Zealand's Chinese New Year Festival (2019), Otago Tour for Samoan Language week (2019) as well as the opening ceremony for the Wellington International Pride Festival (2020).

Leota accompanied Louis Baker on his national tour as a backing vocalist for his EP Love Levitates (2021). They performed at the Hollywood Theatre in Auckland, Theatre Royal in Nelson, James Hay Theatre in Christchurch and Opera House in Wellington. Leota was connected with Louis Baker through another New Zealand vocalist Lisa Thomlins, she needed cover for a gig with him and approached Leota for the role. One of the performance's Leota did with Louis Baker was on RNZ. At the time Bret McKenzie was searching for a backing vocalist for his upcoming international solo tour, his wife had watched Baker's RNZ performance, seen Leota and recommended her to Mckenzie who then reached out to her.

Leota accompanied Bret McKenzie of the Flight of the Conchords on his international tour providing backing vocals for his latest solo album Songs without Jokes (2022.) The tour was 3 months long and spanned 46 different locations over New Zealand, UK and US. She also recorded backing vocals for the album.

Under her stage name MOZIE, Leota released her debut single Not Done Loving (2022). Her original Soul / RnB sound was well received and released onto New Zealand's top radio stations. The single was written alongside her long-time collaborator Hunter Paranihi and is a song about 'the one that got away.' Paranihi also produced the single. Her band for the single consisted of: James Illinworth on keys, Johnny Lawrence and Bass, Hunter Parahini on Guitar and Ato Baido on drums and percussion. The single was mastered by Mike Gibson and Munki Music. Throughout the process she was guided and mentored by Kirsten Te Riho as well as Kate Orgias. The music video Not Done Loving was fillmed in Waiorongomai, South Wairarapa. It was self-directed by Leota with a crew of family and friends.

Leota's influences for her music include Cleo Soul, Lauryn Hill, Joy Crookes, Inflo, and James Blake, among others.

== Personal life ==
Leota welcomed her first-born son with her partner Brett Taefu who is an actor and artist, in early 2023. The two met at a Barbershop workshop while in high school.

== Notable works ==
Discography
Released	Title	Collaborators
2022	Not Done Loving	Prod. & co-written by Hunter Paranihi

Vocalist & Soloist Work
Year	Role	Production	Production company / Director
2014	Soloist	Moana Takes Flight	Solo Concert with Guests
2014	Soloist	Government House	Christmas Carols
2015	Soloist	Government House	Christmas Carols
2018	Vocalist	Measina Festival	Eighteen
2018	Solo Vocalist	World Beats Centre	Le Moana Productions US & Mexico Tour
2019	Solo Vocalist	Opening Ceremony	Chinese New Year Festival
2019	Solo Vocalist	Otago Tour	Samoan Language Week
2019	Vocalist	Powerhouse	WITCH
2020	Solo Vocalist	Opening Ceremony	Wellington International Pride Parade
2021	Vocalist	Louis Baker Love Levitates Tour	National Tour for Louis Baker Love Levitates EP
2022	Vocalist	Bret Mckenzie Songs without Jokes Tour	Bret Mckenzie NZ, UK and USA Tour for his album Songs without Jokes

Theatre
Year	Role	Production	Production company / Director
2014	Lead	Fatu Na Toto for Wellington Fringe Festival	Le Moana Productions
2016	Rizzo	Grease	Rongotai College
2016	Lead	Tempo Dance Festival	Le Moana Productions
2018	Lead	San Diego International Fringe Festival	Le Moana Productions
2019	Pepper Walker	Cry Baby	Te Auaha
2019	Captain Fantastic	Heroes and Villains	Orchestra Wellington
2020	Judas	Jesus Christ Superstar	Te Auaha

Commercial
Year	Role	Production	Production company / Director
2013	Lead Vocalist	Interislander	Colenso BBDO
2013	Vocalist	Tip Top Ice Cream	Colenso BBDO
2021	Various Female Characters	Tick for Governance	VOOTN Voice & Video
