= Team Ball Player Thing =

Single by #KiwisCureBatten
- Released: 11 September 2015
- Recorded: 2015; Auckland and Los Angeles
- Genre: Pop; parody music; charity song
- Length: 4:08
- Label: Collusion
- Songwriters: Joel Little; Brooke Howard-Smith; Jesse Griffin; Tom Furniss; Joseph Moore
- Producer: Joel Little

Cure Kids charity singles chronology
"Feel Inside (And Stuff Like That)" (2012)	"Team Ball Player Thing" (2015)

"Team Ball Player Thing" is a 2015 charity single and the official supporters' song of the All Blacks in the 2015 Rugby World Cup. The song is performed by the charity supergroup #KiwisCureBatten and is in aid of research into Batten disease via the New Zealand charity Cure Kids. The day after it was released, the song debuted at number six on the New Zealand Top 40.

The song is officially credited as featuring Lorde, Kimbra, Brooke Fraser, Gin Wigmore, Broods, Daniel Bedingfield, The Naked and Famous, Sam McCarthy, Sahara Adams, Jemaine Clement, Savage, Jon Toogood, Jason Kerrison, Dave Dobbyn, Matiu Walters, Dave Baxter, Hollie Smith, Jupiter Project, Boh Runga, Jamie Curry, K.One, Lizzie Marvelly, Carly Binding, Jesse Griffin, Brooke Howard-Smith, Tom Furniss, Joseph Moore, PNC, Peter Urlich and Julia Deans. The music video features these and other artists, as well as New Zealand actors, comedians and rugby players.

== Background ==
The project was organised by Brooke Howard-Smith and comedian Jesse Griffin, who approached film-maker Taika Waititi and songwriter/producer Joel Little. Like Cure Kids' 2012 charity single "Feel Inside (And Stuff Like That)", the lyrics of the song were based on ideas from young children. The song's title comes from a young girl who says the All Blacks "should just pass to the other team, ball, player... thing". The song is intended to be both a parody of sports anthems and an actual sports anthem. Vocal parts were recorded at Little's studio in Los Angeles and at a studio in Auckland.

== Music video ==
The music video was directed by Taika Waititi and Jesse Griffin. As well as featuring the performers of the song, the video also includes appearances from members of the All Blacks, New Zealand actors and comedians and the children who contributed the lyrics. The full-length video starts with a 10-minute skit based around a meeting where the song is planned.

=== Full music video appearances ===
Singers

- Alisa Xayalith (The Naked and Famous)
- Boh Runga
- Brooke Fraser
- Caleb Nott (Broods)
- Daniel Bedingfield
- Dave Baxter
- Dave Dobbyn
- Gavin Correia (Jupiter Project)
- Georgia Nott (Broods)
- Gin Wigmore
- Hollie Smith
- James Reid (The Feelers)
- Jason Kerrison
- Joel Little
- Jon Toogood
- Jordan Luck
- K.One
- Kimbra
- Lorde
- Marty Rich (Jupiter Project)
- Matiu Walters (Six60)
- Peter Urlich
- Sahara Adams
- Sam McCarthy (Kids of 88)
- Savage
- Thom Powers (The Naked and Famous)

Rugby players

- Brodie Retallick
- Colin Slade
- Cory Jane
- Hika Elliot
- Jerome Kaino
- Julian Savea
- Ryan Crotty
- Stephen Donald

Actors and other personalities

- Brooke Howard-Smith
- David de Lautour
- Jamie Curry
- Kieren Hutchison
- Madeleine Sami
- Melanie Lynskey
- Sir Peter Jackson
- Taika Waititi
- Zoë Bell

Comedians

- Bret McKenzie
- Jemaine Clement
- Jesse Griffin
- Joseph Moore
- Rhys Darby
- Tom Furniss

== Charts ==
Chart (2015)	Peak position
New Zealand (Recorded Music NZ)	2
