= Flight of the Conchords (disambiguation) =

Flight of the Conchords is a musical comedy duo from New Zealand. It's also the title of three of the duo's works:

- Flight of the Conchords (album), their debut album
- Flight of the Conchords (radio series), their BBC radio series
- Flight of the Conchords (TV series), their HBO television series
