= Freak Out City =

Studio album by Bret McKenzie
- Released: 15 August 2025
- Studio: EastWest (Los Angeles); Sunset Sound (Los Angeles); Massey (Wellington); Surgery (Wellington)
- Length: 35:15
- Label: Sub Pop
- Producer: Bret McKenzie; Mickey Petralia

Bret McKenzie chronology
Songs Without Jokes (2022)	Freak Out City (2025)

Singles from Freak Out City
- 1. "All I Need" Released: 5 June 2025

Freak Out City is the second studio album by New Zealand actor and musician Bret McKenzie. It was released on 15 August 2025 via Sub Pop in LP, CD and digital formats. Produced by McKenzie and Mickey Petralia, the album was recorded in Los Angeles and New Zealand. "All I Need" was released as the lead single of the album on 5 June 2025.

== Reception ==
Professional ratings
Review scores
Source	Rating
Beats Per Minute	67%
God Is in the TV	9/10
Spectrum Culture	60%

Loz Etheridge of God Is in the TV called the album "even better than the debut" and "superbly crafted with a nod to the greats."

Beats Per Minute's Ray Finlayson noted it as "more vibrant than its predecessor" and the album "lulls when the mood does, despite the colourful production and instrumentation."

Writing for Spectrum Culture, Eoghan Lyng commented, "Freak Out City shows the artist largely abandoning comedy for more conventional pop, a decision which works in its favor just as often as it doesn't."

== Track listing ==
All tracks are written by Bret McKenzie, except "That's the Way That the World Goes 'Round" written by John Prine.

Freak Out City track listing
No.	Title	Length
1.	"Bethnal Green Blues"	4:12
2.	"Freak Out City"	4:51
3.	"The Only Dream I Know"	2:30
4.	"All the Time"	5:06
5.	"That's the Way That the World Goes 'Round"	3:10
6.	"All I Need"	4:07
7.	"Eyes on the Sun"	3:05
8.	"Too Young"	4:30
9.	"Highs and Lows"	3:44
10.	"Shouldna Come Here Tonight"	3:48
Total length:		35:15

== Personnel ==
Credits adapted from the album's liner notes.

- Bret McKenzie – lead vocals, guitars, arrangements, production
- Moana Leota – backing vocals
- Iris Little – backing vocals
- Drew Erickson – keyboards, string arrangements
- Chris Caswell – keyboards
- Leo Coghini – keyboards
- Justin Clarke – guitars
- Dean Parks – guitars
- Ben Lemi – drums
- Joey Waronker – drums
- Jacqui Nyman – bass
- Leland Sklar – bass
- Bryn van Vliet – saxophone
- Louisa Williamson – saxophone
- Kaito Walley – trombone
- Andrew Bulbrook – violin
- Wynton Grant – violin
- Sarena Hsu – viola
- Christine Kim – cello
- Lee Prebble – bottle smashing, chief engineering
- Mickey Petralia – production, chief engineering
- Michael Harris – mixing, chief engineering
- Darrell Thorp – chief engineering
- Troy Kelly – chief engineering
- Chaz Sexton – assistant engineering
- Jacob Kell – assistant engineering
- Tucker Andrew – assistant engineering
- Carter Shepstone – assistant engineering
- Logan Taylor – assistant engineering
- Mike Gibson – assistant engineering
- George Janho – assistant engineering
- Zack Zajdel – assistant engineering
- Dusty Summers – art direction, design
- Ardneks – illustrations
