= Figwit =

Fan-name for a minor character in the Fellowship of the Ring movie

Bret McKenzie as "Elf Escort" in The Lord of the Rings: The Return of the King.

Figwit is a fan-created name for a then-unnamed Elf Escort in Peter Jackson's The Lord of the Rings film series, played by Bret McKenzie of the musical duo Flight of the Conchords. The name Figwit derives from an acronym for "Frodo is great...who is THAT?!?" [sic]. The character quickly and unexpectedly became popular among the Tolkien fandom, and is perceived as an example of famous for being famous, a view shared by the character's actor himself.

== Background ==
Bret McKenzie, half of the musical comedy duo Flight of the Conchords, first landed a small role as an extra in The Lord of the Rings: The Fellowship of the Ring. He appears sitting next to Aragorn during the council in Rivendell scene. The elf was dubbed "Figwit" by fan Iris Hadad; after seeing Frodo agree to take the ring, saying "I will take it", the film switches to a shot where Figwit can be seen standing on the far right, and Hadad's initial reaction was "Frodo is great...who is THAT?!?" Later, Hadad corresponded with her university friend Sherry de Andres, and the two created the first Figwit fan website, www.figwitlives.net, calling him "Legolas for the thinking woman".

McKenzie appeared again in the third film, The Lord of the Rings: The Return of the King, where he was credited as "Elf Escort". He appears in the scene where Arwen is leaving for the Grey Havens and has a vision of her future son, Eldarion, this time with two lines warning her not to delay and then exclaiming as she turns around. Director Peter Jackson stated in the DVD commentary for The Return of the King that Figwit was called back and given dialogue in the third film "just for fun for the fans" because "so much fuss has been made about him over the last couple of years".

McKenzie played another elf in The Hobbit: An Unexpected Journey, Lindir, who has a brief appearance in the novel The Fellowship of the Ring. McKenzie has stated that Lindir and Figwit are different characters.

== Popularity ==
Though he only appeared for about three seconds in Fellowship of the Ring, Figwit's popularity soon blossomed, with Hadad stating that "[the fan site] got a lot of e-mails from people who thought they were the only ones who had noticed that handsome, dark-haired elf". Figwit's physical appearance and demeanor are the source of much of his popularity: he has been noted for his "lithe and graceful" movement, "enigmatic broodiness", "haughty demeanor", and "pouty" looks. His fan website proclaims him "in a word, gorgeous. Or another, stunning... hypnotic... stupendous... captivating... take your pick."

McKenzie has stated that the Figwit obsession is "weird," though he is "flattered." He has remarked that "it's so hilarious because it's been propelled by so little ... I'm famous for doing nothing."

A Topps Authentic Autograph card featuring 'Figwit' and Bret McKenzie's signature.

=== In other media ===
Figwit does not appear in Tolkien's writings and was created exclusively for the films; thus there is little authentic information regarding him, save that he is a royal escort. The only "official" place where the name Figwit is used is on several Topps trading cards, including a The Return of the King series card, titled "Return to Rivendell," and an Authentic Autographs card featuring the signature of actor Bret McKenzie. In The Lord of the Rings Trading Card Game he was assigned the name of Aegnor, one of Galadriel's brothers in The Silmarillion. A Figwit action figure was also created, though it was named "Elven Escort," as in the film.

Figwit has been a subject of poetry, art, and fiction, in particular in the slash genre of Tolkien fan fiction, where he is named Melpomaen. This is a chimera translation of "figwit" from two of Tolkien's Elvish languages: melpo, Quenya for "fig", and maen, Noldorin for clever or skilled.

=== Documentary ===
In 2004, a 57-minute documentary on the Figwit phenomenon was created by McKenzie's fiancée (and now wife) Hannah Clarke and friends Stan Alley and Nick Booth. Entitled Frodo Is Great... Who Is That?!!, it premiered at the Auckland International Film Festival on July 23. Meant to "[unravel] Bret's identity", it follows McKenzie to the Edinburgh Festival Fringe, where he meets the fans of his trademark pout and "elvish good looks", and features extensive interviews with fans behind various Figwit fan sites as well as with Peter Jackson, Barrie Osborne, Mark Ordesky, Ian McKellen, and other cast members. Booth stated that their film was "much more irreverent and strange" compared to other behind-the-scenes documentaries of the film trilogy, which were "very much driven around the production and the cast and Tolkien".
