= Live in London (Flight of the Conchords album) =

2018 comedy special

- Film poster
- Also known as: Flight of the Conchords: Live in London
- Written by: Jemaine Clement; Bret McKenzie
- Directed by: Hamish Hamilton
- Music by: Jemaine Clement; Bret McKenzie
- Country of origin: New Zealand

Production
- Producers: Jemaine Clement; Bret McKenzie; Jim Parsons
- Editors: James Collett; Guy Harding
- Running time: 88 minutes

Original release
- Release: 6 October 2018

Flight of the Conchords: Live in London is a 2018 stand-up comedy and music special by Flight of the Conchords. The special was recorded live in July 2018 at the Eventim Apollo in London, and released by HBO on 6 October 2018. The special was released as a double album as Live in London by Sub Pop in March 2019.

Outside of sets on shows like Just for Laughs and One Night Stand, recorded in 2004 and 2005 respectively, Live in London is the duo's first comedy special. The album release was their fifth overall, and fourth that was widely distributed.

== Background and release ==
Flight of the Conchords launched a sold-out tour of the United Kingdom and Ireland in March 2018 titled Flight of the Conchords Sing Flight of the Conchords Tour; many of the dates were rescheduled to June–July 2018 following Bret McKenzie breaking his hand mid-tour. The reunion tour featured a sixteen song set which was a mix of their classics, songs from their television show, and six new songs.

Flight of the Conchords played four nights at the end of the tour at the Eventim Apollo in London during which they recorded their performances with director Hamish Hamilton for HBO. The special premiered on HBO in October 2018. Ahead of the premiere, they performed the song "Father and Son" on The Late Show with Stephen Colbert.

The duo said that they were interested in producing their first full-length comedy special to capture the essence of their live show, with McKenzie explaining, "I like the idea of capturing what we do live, because it doesn’t really exist on tape. We’ve spent so many years touring, but we’re more well known for the TV show, which is actually quite different from what we really do." They have indicated that this would likely be their only Flight of the Conchords project of this scope for some time.

== Album ==
Live in London

Live album by Flight of the Conchords
- Released: 8 March 2019
- Recorded: July 2018
- Venue: Eventim Apollo, London
- Genre: Comedy
- Label: Sub Pop
- Producer: Mickey Petralia

Flight of the Conchords chronology
I Told You I Was Freaky (2009)	Live in London (2019)

Singles from Live in London
- 1. "Father and Son (Live in London)" Released: 2018; 2. "Iain and Deanna (Live in London)" Released: 2019

The album version of the special, titled Live in London, on 8 March 2019. It was released as a double album by Sub Pop, their fourth release with the label and their first in ten years. The album premiered in the United States in February on NPR's First Listen.

Live in London album features six new songs by the band, “Iain and Deanna”, “Father and Son”, “Summer of 1353”, “Stana”, “Seagull”, and “Back on the Road”, as well as the first album version of “Bus Driver.” Additionally, the release includes versions of “Carol Brown” and “The Most Beautiful Girl (In The Room)" which were edited out of the HBO special due to time constraints.

== Track listing ==
Credits adapted from the album's liner notes.

All tracks are written by Bret McKenzie and Jemaine Clement.

Live in London – Disc one
No.	Title	Length
1.	"Father and Son"	6:22
2.	"Band Reunion" (banter)	4:29
3.	"Iain And Deanna"	4:35
4.	"Inner City Pressure"	3:03
5.	"New Zealand Symphony Orchestra" (banter)	1:17
6.	"Summer Of 1353"	7:41
7.	"Complimentary Muffin" (banter)	3:47
8.	"Stana"	9:22
9.	"Stuck In A Lift" (banter)	2:47
10.	"Foux Du Fafa"	6:47
11.	"Seagull"	5:40
12.	"Mutha'uckas - Hurt Feelings"	6:24

Live in London – Disc two
No.	Title	Length
1.	"One More Anecdote" (banter)	4:56
2.	"Back On The Road"	2:44
3.	"Thank You London" (banter)	0:45
4.	"Bowie"	4:17
5.	"Bus Driver"	5:03
6.	"Tuning" (banter)	0:36
7.	"Robots"	4:57
8.	"Shady Rachel"	4:27
9.	"Carol Brown"	3:27
10.	"The Most Beautiful Girl (In The Room)"	3:57
Total length:		1:37:01

== Personnel ==
Musicians

- Bret McKenzie – vocals, guitar, bass guitar, piano, recorder, percussion
- Jemaine Clement – vocals, guitar, bass guitar, synthesizer, flute, percussion
- Nigel Collins – cello, bass guitar, vocals (as "The New Zealand Sympathy Orchestra")

Production

- Mickey Petralia – producer, mixing engineer
- Mike Leach – FOH engineer
- Matt Shane – monitor engineer, backline

Management & Art

- Bret McKenzie – art direction
- Jemaine Clement – art direction
- Sasha Barr – art direction
- Jennifer McCord – photography
- Rebecca Travis – tour manager
- Marc Janowitz – production manager, lighting designer
- Red Light Management (Eric Mayers, Jay Barnings, Mike Martinovich, Olivia Harrington) – management
- Mark Kaplan – business management
- Doug Mark – legal
- Jeff Endlich – legal
- Hamish Hamilton – other contributions
- James Merryman – other contributions
- Jim Parsons – other contributions
- Rachel French – other contributions
- Simon Pizey – other contributions
