= Folk the World Tour =

Live album by Flight of the Conchords
- Released: 14 November 2002
- Recorded: April 2001 at BATS Theatre, Wellington; May 2002 at The Classic, Auckland; June 2002 at Cable Street Studio, Wellington
- Genre: Comedy, folk, acoustic
- Length: 47:58
- Label: Flight of the Conchords Music
- Producer: Flight of the Conchords

Flight of the Conchords chronology
| Folk the World Tour (2002) | The Distant Future (2007) |

Folk the World Tour is the debut live album by New Zealand comedy folk band Flight of the Conchords. Self-released on 14 November 2002, the album was recorded at two shows in New Zealand, in April 2001 at the BATS Theatre in Wellington and in May 2002 at The Classic in Auckland. The album also includes two studio tracks, "Hotties" and "Frodo", recorded in June 2002 at Cable Street Studio in Wellington.

== Track listing ==
All tracks are written by Jemaine Clement and Bret McKenzie

| No. | Title | Recording details | Length |
|---|---|---|---|
| 1. | "Petrov, Yelyena, and Me" | May 2002 at The Classic, Auckland | 6:07 |
| 2. | "K.I.S.S.I.N.G" (part A) | May 2002 at The Classic, Auckland | 1:46 |
| 3. | "K.I.S.S.I.N.G" (part B) (also known as "A Kiss Is Not a Contract") | May 2002 at The Classic, Auckland | 1:12 |
| 4. | "Pencils in the Wind" | May 2002 at The Classic, Auckland | 4:04 |
| 5. | "Bus Driver's Song" | May 2002 at The Classic, Auckland | 4:51 |
| 6. | "Angels" | April 2001 at BATS Theatre, Wellington | 2:57 |
| 7. | "Bowie" | April 2001 at BATS Theatre, Wellington | 4:02 |
| 8. | "Albi" | May 2002 at The Classic, Auckland | 2:06 |
| 9. | "Mermaid" (part A) | May 2002 at The Classic, Auckland | 3:23 |
| 10. | "Mermaid" (part B) | April 2001 at BATS Theatre, Wellington | 4:11 |
| 11. | "Nothin' Wrong" | May 2002 at The Classic, Auckland | 2:51 |
| 12. | "Something Special for the Ladies" (also known as "Ladies of the World") | May 2002 at The Classic, Auckland | 3:38 |
| 13. | "Hotties" | June 2002 at Cable Street Studio, Wellington | 3:12 |
| 14. | "Frodo" (2000 L.O.T.R rejected demo version) | June 2002 at Cable Street Studio, Wellington | 3:33 |

== Personnel ==
Flight of the Conchords

- Jemaine Clement – vocals, acoustic guitar, production
- Bret McKenzie – vocals, acoustic guitar, production

Additional musical personnel

- Adrian Pryor – electric guitar
- Stephen Jessup – lap steel guitar
- Tim Jaray – bass, double bass
- Paul Hoskins – drums
- Chris Yeabsley – keyboards
- Toby Laing – synthesizers, trumpet
- Nigel Collins – cello
- Andrew Johnson – didgeridoo

Production personnel

- Michael Cole – engineering on tracks 1, 2, 3, 4, 5, 8 and 9
- Tristan Nelson-Hauer – engineering on tracks 1, 2, 3, 4, 5, 8 and 9
- Lee Prebble – engineering on tracks 6, 7 and 10
- Mike Gibson – mastering
