= Brooke Howard-Smith =

New Zealand broadcaster

- Born: Brooke Howard-Smith; 6 October 1972 (age 52); Auckland, New Zealand
- Occupation: Tv Presenter / Entrepreneur
- Years active: 1999–present
- Spouse: Amber Peebles (m. 2009)
- Children: 0

Brooke Howard-Smith (born 6 October 1972) is an entrepreneur, New Zealand broadcaster, television presenter and artist having most recently exhibited at 42 Below's space in Auckland.

== Action sports ==
At age 21 Brooke and Arlo Eisenberg started skate company Senate industries The company became one of the world's largest makers of inline accessories, turning over in excess of 13 million dollars in 1997. In 1996 he founded England Clothing. In 1999 he started a shoe company called Poynter Footwear. Known more for his OTT personality and crashes than his skating, he is commonly thought of as the inventor of several tricks, including the Royale. Brooke is credited with being instrumental in the birth of Street and vert inline skating. Over a period of 11 years he competed in multiple X Games and world championships and toured with the likes of Matt Hoffman and Tony Hawk. In 1996 he was featured in the finale of the closing ceremony of the Atlanta Olympics with Hawk, Hoffman and a small group of action sport heroes.

Howard-Smith won the bronze medal at the X Games Rhode Island in 1995.

== TV and radio ==
Brooke is a New Zealand television personality, well known for his role presenting TV3's Target consumer affairs show, as well as Celebrity Joker Poker and TV2's XSTV an extreme sports show and Brooke was a part of the presenting line up for the 2007 Rugby World Cup in France. He also presented NZ Performance Car TV series 5 as well as the television coverage of the 2008 Coca-Cola Christmas in the Park, TV3's Big Night In telethon and Māori Television's Rise Up Christchurch telethon.

Brooke was a judge for a challenge on the New Zealand television show The Block in September 2012 and in 2014, he hosted the reality show, Cadbury Dream Factory.

Howard-Smith featured as a contestant on The Traitors season 1 in New Zealand.

== Philanthropy ==
Brooke organised Rise up Christchurch in 2011 for the Christchurch earthquake. The event raised $2.7 million for the Prime Minister's Fund. Brooke and Jesse Griffin produced Comedy for Cure Kids for TV3. as a part of the 2012 event he created the charity single "Feel Inside (And Stuff Like That)" with the Flight of the Conchords. The song won the 2012 Tui for highest selling single.

The team returned in 2015 to produce a charity supporters song for the All Blacks titled "Team Ball Player Thing". The song reached number 1 and has over a million views on Facebook and YouTube.

In 2022 he led a team at Non Fungible Labs to raise $1.1 million for Auckland City Mission.

Brooke is co-founder of the Futureverse Foundation alongside artist Alexandra Grant and actor Keanu Reeves. The foundation aims to invest in underrepresented artists, creatives and communities in order to build more diverse, equitable, and inclusive spaces in both the real world and the metaverse.

== Business ==
Brooke has co-founded over 20 businesses including Senate Industries, England Clothing, Poynter Footwear, Holistic purpose focused talent agency WeAreTENZING, Social campaign software platform Otterfish and Metaverse creation leader Non Fungible Labs

== Personal life ==
Brooke is married to former Miss New Zealand and actress/television presenter, Amber Peebles. Between 2005 and 2010 he owned and ran the Auckland nightclub The Pony Club.

== See also ==
- List of New Zealand television personalities
