= The Mysterious Secrets Of Uncle Bertie's Botanarium =

Historical fiction podcast by Stitcher

The Mysterious Secrets Of Uncle Berties Botanarium Podcast

The Mysterious Secrets Of Uncle Bertie's Botanarium is a historical fiction podcast produced by South Coast Shenanigans and Stitcher and hosted by Jemaine Clement.

== Background ==
The podcast was originally intended to be a film, which had a video trailer released in 2011, but creating a film was too expensive so the creators considered making a graphic novel or radio program instead. They decided on creating a podcast, which debuted March 16, 2016 exclusively on Howl.fm. The show was released on February 1, 2017 for free on other platforms. The podcast was a 24 episodes series. The podcast stars Jemaine Clement as Lord Joseph Banks and the show was written and produced by Duncan Sarkies, Stephen Templer, and James Milne. Milne, also known as Lawrence Arabia created the music for the podcast. The podcast is a story about the British botanist Joseph Banks in a parallel world with an alternate history. The show contains elements of historical fiction, fantasy, adventure fiction, and comedy.

== Reception ==
Karl Puschmann wrote in The New Zealand Herald that the podcast is a "lavishly produced, epic-sized, comedy-adventure". Diana Brown wrote in Black Information Network that the show is "Lush, fantastical, and very funny".
