= So You're a Man =

Five-man comedy troupe

So You're a Man were a five-man comedy troupe, who performed in the mid-90s in both New Zealand and Australia. Members were Bret McKenzie, Jemaine Clement, Taika Waititi, actor Carey Smith and theatre director David Lawrence.

They met as members of the Drama Club at Victoria University of Wellington, (where Clement, Waititi and Lawrence were studying theatre and film, and McKenzie classics and music) and first appeared as a quintet in a segment of a show called 'Bodyplay', conceived and directed by Duncan Sarkies.

'So You're A Man' premiered at The Basement Theatre in Auckland in May 1996, played a sell-out season at BATS Theatre in Wellington in October/November 1996, and then a month at the Last Laugh in Melbourne, Australia in March/April 1997, with one-off performances and university Orientation gigs in between. The show was a 1950s-style mockumentary guide to coping with manhood, covering such topics as proper urinal etiquette, interactions with women, facial hair, personal grooming and how to find the clitoris. The five actors performed in flesh-coloured 'nudie-suits' and all played the guitar.

This group was a precursor to both The Humourbeasts and Flight of the Conchords. The group has been mentioned in a number of media articles about the Flight of the Conchords, in both the New York Times and Sydney Morning Herald.

After the Melbourne comedy festival, where they played on the same bill as Simon Pegg, Ed Byrne, Tommy Tiernan and Peepolykus, the group broke up to pursue other interests.

== Sources ==
- http://www.nzonscreen.com/person/jermaine-clement/biography
- http://www.hwwilson.com/Currentbio/cover_bios/cover_bio_3_08.htm
