= Lizzie Marvelly =

New Zealand singer (born 1989)

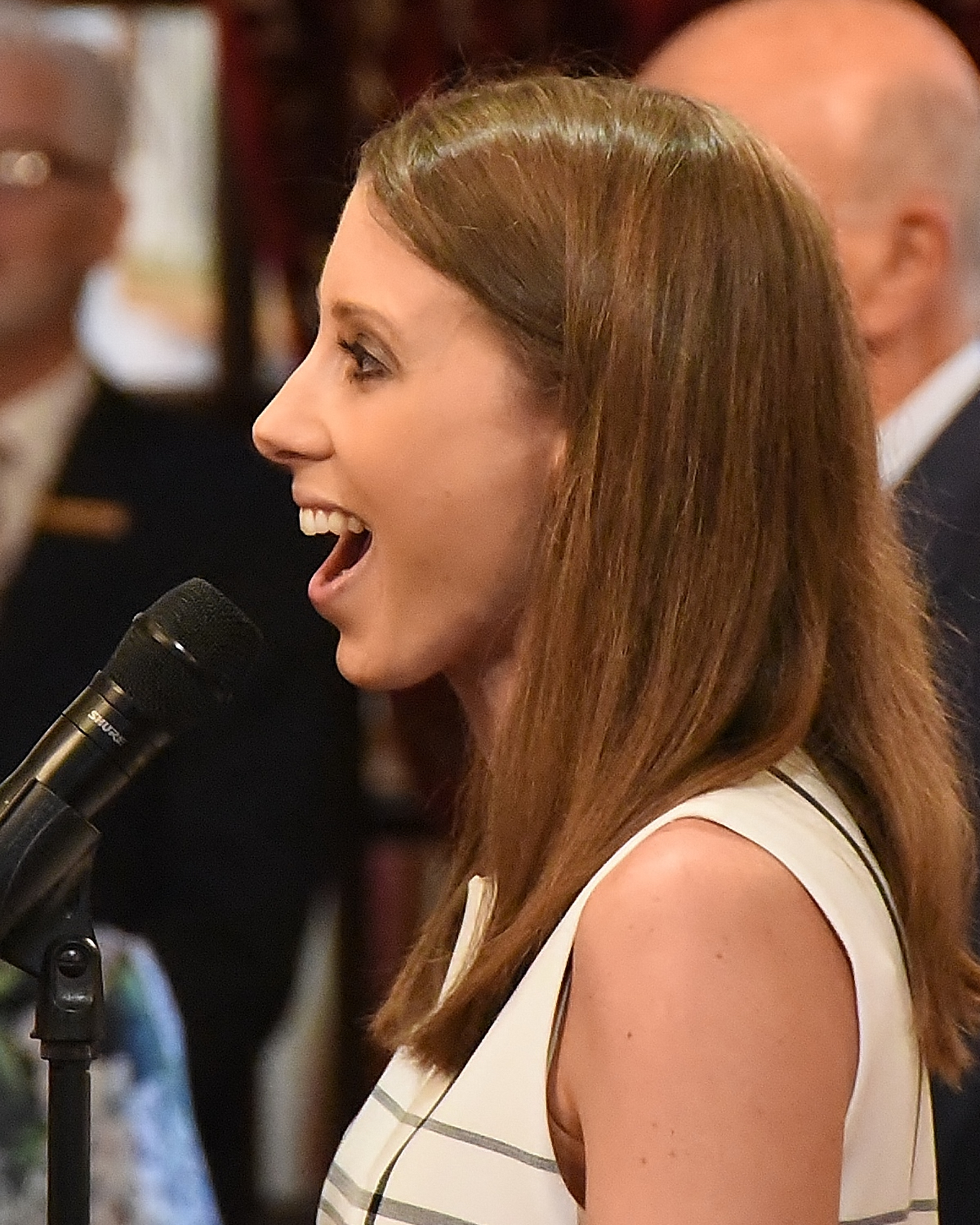
- Marvelly in 2018

Background information
- Born: Elizabeth Lillian Marvelly; 5 July 1989 (age 37); Rotorua, New Zealand
- Origin: Auckland, New Zealand
- Genres: Classical crossover, operatic pop, pop
- Occupations: Singer, songwriter
- Years active: 2006–present
- Website: lizziemarvelly.com

Elizabeth Lillian Marvelly (born 5 July 1989) is a singer, songwriter and social commentator from Rotorua, New Zealand. She first achieved success as a classical crossover vocalist before switching to pop music. She ran the website Villainesse until 2021, and has written for the New Zealand Herald, discussing feminist issues. From July 2020 to 2021, she was director of the Rotorua Museum. She became Chief Executive of Girl Guiding New Zealand in 2024.

== Background ==
Marvelly was born in Rotorua and is the only child of Brett Marvelly and Vlasta Marvelly née Bartunek. Her maternal grandfather was from Czechoslovakia, escaping from Prague during World War II. Her maternal grandmother Jean Kerrigan was from Ohinemutu and through her Marvelly affiliates to Ngāti Whakaue. She is related to entertainer Howard Morrison, who was her maternal grandfather's best friend. Marvelly grew up in the Prince's Gate Hotel, built in 1897, which her parents owned. She attended Rotorua Girls' High School, and then won a senior scholarship at King's College in Auckland for her seventh form year. She graduated from Massey University with a Bachelor of Arts in English and Psychology in 2015.

== Music career ==
=== Classical crossover music ===
She released her debut album under the name Elizabeth Marvelly on 3 December 2007 in New Zealand, and on 31 March 2008 in Australia. The self-titled pop-classical album was produced by Carl Doy. On the album Marvelly sings songs taken from a range of different genres and includes two original pieces. Her song "When You Are Sad" was reportedly written after a recent case of child abuse in her hometown Rotorua shocked the nation.

Marvelly's second classical crossover album, Home, was recorded with Grammy-nominated producer Nick Patrick. The album featured the New Zealand Symphony Orchestra and a duet with Britain's Got Talent winner Paul Potts. As it was released on 21 February 2011, one day before the 2011 Christchurch earthquake, Marvelly announced that she would be donating a portion of record sales to the Christchurch Earthquake Appeal.

=== Pop music ===
In 2012, Marvelly sang as part of Flight of the Conchords supergroup charity single "Feel Inside (And Stuff Like That)". The song reached number one in the New Zealand charts.

In 2013, Marvelly announced that she would be pursuing a pop career, as she had become dissatisfied with her classical crossover career, and also wanted to sing her own compositions. She said, "I just thought music is my life and if it's going to be my life long-term, then it has to be music that I actually love everything about."

In January 2014, Marvelly launched her pop career, using the name Lizzie Marvelly. Her first pop single, "Generation Young", was also released in January, with her EP Collisions released in July, peaking at number 14 on the charts.

In August 2015, Marvelly released her first single with New Zealand hip hop DJ P-Money. Entitled 'Made For You', the song featured in New Zealand hip hop film 'Born To Dance'. In October the same year Marvelly released a remix of 'Made For You' featuring New Zealand rapper K.One.

=== Live performances ===
Since 2006, Marvelly has performed in a number of high-profile concerts in New Zealand, supporting artists such as Sir Howard Morrison, Dame Malvina Major and Amici Forever star Geoff Sewell. She also supported Paul Potts on his New Zealand and Australian tour in 2008, later joining him on further international dates.

Marvelly is also well known in New Zealand for her performances singing the New Zealand national anthem at rugby test matches in New Zealand and abroad. She performed the national anthem at the 2011 Rugby World Cup final.

== Social commentary ==
In May 2015, Marvelly launched Villainesse, a feminist website for young women. In September that year she launched the first Villainesse project, "#MyBodyMyTerms", a global campaign to spark conversation about sexual violence, victim-blaming, revenge porn and consent.

From January 2016 to April 2020, she wrote a regular column in the New Zealand Herald where she commented on social issues. In a February 2017 column she criticised the conservative Christian lobby group Family First New Zealand for opposing transgender individuals for using toilets not reflecting the sex of their birth. In 2015, Marvelly was a finalist of the Wintec Press Club's Best Writer in New Zealand Award.

== Career outside music ==
In July 2020 she was appointed the director of Rotorua Museum. She stepped down from this role in December 2021. In 2024, she was appointed Chief Executive of GirlGuiding New Zealand.

== Personal life ==
In May 2018, Marvelly revealed publicly that she was bisexual. She had earlier come out to friends, then her family, then colleagues. She said that while 'it shouldn't be a big deal' in 2018, it had not been easy. 'I didn't know I was bi until my early 20s. I didn't know if the people I loved would be okay with it. 'I'm a very private person when it comes to my personal life, and I didn't know whether I could deal with the scrutiny of having my sexuality highlighted in the media.' In mid-2021, Marvelly announced with her partner on Instagram that she was pregnant with her first child. Marvelly announced the birth of her daughter on Twitter (now X) in early 2022.

== Discography ==
=== Albums ===
Year	Title	Details	Peak chart positions	Certifications
Year	Title	Details	NZ	Certifications
2007	Elizabeth Marvelly	Released: 3 December 2007; Label: EMI Music New Zealand	8	NZ: Gold
2009	Home	Released: 21 February 2011; Label: EMI Music New Zealand	6	
"—" denotes a recording that did not chart or was not released in that territory.

=== EPs ===
Year	Title	Details	Peak chart positions
Year	Title	Details	NZ
2014	Collisions	Released: 4 July 2014; Label: Marvellous Music	14
"—" denotes a recording that did not chart or was not released in that territory.

=== Singles ===
Year	Title	Peak chart positions	Album
Year	Title	NZ	Album
2014	"Generation Young"	—	Collisions EP
2014	"My Own Hero"	—	Collisions EP
2015	"Made for You"	—	Non-album single
2015	"Team, Ball, Player, Thing" (#KiwisCureBatten featuring Lorde, Kimbra, Brooke Fraser, et al.)	—	Non-album single
"—" denotes a recording that did not chart or was not released in that territory.
