= Wellington International Ukulele Orchestra =

New Zealand musical group

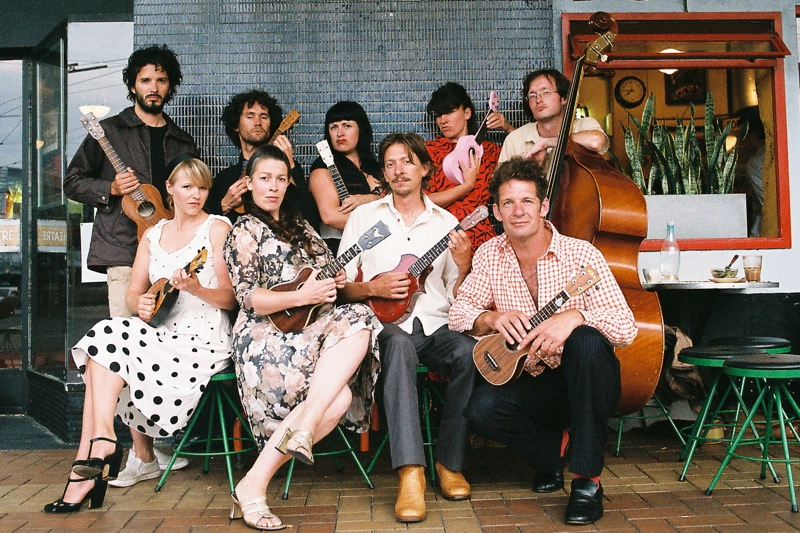
- Members of the Wellington International Ukulele Orchestra outside the Deluxe Cafe in Wellington, New Zealand.

Background information
- Origin: Wellington, New Zealand
- Genre: Various
- Years active: 2005–2020?
- Past members: Age Pryor; Bret McKenzie; Gemma Gracewood; Sam Auger; Steve Jessup; Francis Salole; Megan Salole (Hosking); Andy Morley-Hall; Dan Yeabsley; Carmel Russell; Nigel Collins; Bek Coogan

The Wellington International Ukulele Orchestra is an ensemble of ukulele players based in Wellington, New Zealand. Apart from a double bass the band is composed entirely of ukuleles. Their repertoire consists mainly of covers of modern popular music and some ukulele and New Zealand standards. Costumes and comic banter are also part of the WIUO appeal.

== Description ==
The increased public profile of one of their members Bret McKenzie — one half of the Flight of the Conchords — combined with the use of their songs for a nationwide advertising campaign for New Zealand bookstore chain Whitcoulls in late 2008 resulted in an increase in their national profile. On 15 December 2008 their Little Bit Wonderful EP reached no. 32 in the Official NZ Music Chart. The same recording topped the NZ Indie Music Chart for January 2009.

Until November 2008, the band played a weekly early morning gig at the tiny Deluxe Cafe in downtown Wellington, which was also featured in their first music video directed by Tim Capper for their cover of the song "It's a Heartache".

The band made occasional tours of New Zealand and has performed in festivals including Womad New Zealand, Cuba Street Carnival, New Zealand International Comedy Festival, Big Day Out Auckland and arts festivals in Christchurch, Nelson, Tauranga and Taupo.

The WIUO is one of New Zealand's most popular live acts, touring throughout Australia, United Kingdom and the United States. The band has performed sold-out shows at the Edinburgh Fringe Festival, the Melbourne Comedy Festival and the New Zealand International Comedy Festival where they won the Best Local Act award.

The band recorded the theme music for the TV comedy Diplomatic Immunity, a documentary series about renowned New Zealand entertainer Sir Howard Morrison and a documentary about NZ war songs.

In 2009, the band recorded their third EP, The Dreaming EP, at Neil Finn's Roundhead Studios. In 2011, the third EP, The Dreaming EP, was recorded in the lounge of one of the band members and was mixed by Lee Prebble. In 2014, the band recorded their first full-length CD, Be Mine Tonight, at an undisclosed location in Wellington. It was mixed by Wellington sound engineer Neil Maddever in his mobile sound studio. This recording was documented in a radio diary for the public radio station Radio New Zealand National by producer and band member Gemma Gracewood.

The band's musical leader Age Pryor has producing credits on all of the recordings.

In January 2016 the WIUO toured the United States for the third time, but without several original members – Nigel Collins, Sam Auger, Gemma Gracewood, Carmel Russell and Dan Yeabsley. Bass player Hal Strewe and singer/ukulele player Deanne Krieg stepped in to bring the touring party up to eight members.

In June 2017, the group announced they were taking a break while members pursued other projects.

By January 2020, the group's website (www.ukelele.co.nz) was no longer available, and by August 2021 the domain was being occupied by an Indonesian blog. Their Facebook page remains sporadically active, with occasional posts about other ukulele related events or people. As of March 2022, the most recent post was from September 2020. Their MySpace page is no longer available.

In early November 2026, the band announced it was getting back together. A new website is operational at https://ukuleles.co.nz/ and two live shows were announced for March 2027 as part of the celebrations of the re-opening, after nearly 14 years, of Wellington Town Hall.

== Discography ==
=== Albums ===
List of studio albums
Title	Track listing
Be Mine Tonight: Released: 2014; Own record label (CD)	1. "Be Mine Tonight" (4:23); 2. "Wake Up" (5:22); 3. "Counting the Beat" (2:54); 4. "Team" (2:38); 5. "Long Ago" (4:07); 6. "Today Is Gonna Be Mine" (3:11); 7. "Howzat " (3:15); 8. "Jezebel" (2:59); 9. "E Ipo" (3:25); 10. "Slippin' Away" (2:52); 11. "Something in the Water" (3:04); 12. "Second Chance" (3:38); 13. "Till We Kissed" (3:18); 14. "Hine E Hine" (2.15)

=== Extended plays ===
List of extended plays
Title	Track listing
The Heartache EP: Released: 2007; Own record label (CD)	1. "The Bucket" (3:22); 2. "Weather With You" (3:10); 3. "It's a Heartache" (4:46); 4. "New Zealand Christmas Tree" (2:25); 5. "Hoki Mai" (2:01)
A Little Bit Wonderful EP: Released: 2008; Own record label (CD)	1. "Ruby, Don't Take Your Love to Town" (2:54); 2. "Israelites (3:15); 3. "Feliz Navidad (2:32); 4. "Sophie" (3:25); 5. "Walk in the Park" (2:25)
The Dreaming EP: Released: 28 September 2009; Own record label (CD)	1. "Africa" (4:13); 2. "Dreaming of You" (2:19); 3. "Blue Smoke" (4:08); 4. "I Could Never Take the Place of Your Man" (3:27); 5. "That's Amore" (2:48)
I Love You... EP: Released: 2011; Own record label (CD)	1. "Afternoon Delight" (2:59); 2. "Boogey Man" (3:47); 3. "This Charming Man" (2:49); 4. "All Through the Night" (4:35); 5. "Raylene" (3:13); 6. "Jolene (3:26); 7. "Cry Me a River" (5:05)
