= Jemaine Clement =

New Zealand actor, musician and filmmaker (born 1974)

- Clement at the 2026 Tribeca Festival
- Born: Jemaine Atea Mahana Clement; 10 January 1974 (age 52); Masterton, New Zealand
- Other names: Hiphopopotamus, J-Dog, Mad Dog
- Education: Victoria University of Wellington (BA)
- Occupations: Actor; comedian; musician; filmmaker
- Years active: 1994–present
- Spouse: Miranda Manasiadis (m. 2008)
- Children: 1
- Musical career
- Genres: Comedy; folk; acoustic
- Instruments: Bass guitar; guitar; percussion; keyboards; ukulele; omnichord; drums; flute; xylophone; accordion; vocals
- Label: Sub Pop
- Member of: Flight of the Conchords

Comedy career
- Medium: Stand-up; film; television; music; theatre; books
- Genres: Observational comedy; satire; black comedy; self-deprecation; musical comedy; cringe comedy; deadpan
- Subjects: New Zealand culture; race relations; human sexuality

Jemaine Atea Mahana Clement (born 10 January 1974) is a New Zealand actor, comedian, musician, and filmmaker. He has released several albums with Bret McKenzie as the musical comedy duo Flight of the Conchords, and created the comedy television series of the same name (2007–2009) for both the BBC and HBO, for which he received six Primetime Emmy nominations.

He has had featured parts in films including Eagle vs Shark (2007), Gentlemen Broncos (2009), Men in Black 3 (2012), People Places Things (2015), The BFG (2016), Avatar: The Way of Water (2022), and A Minecraft Movie (2025). He has also done voice work for Rio (2011) and its sequel Rio 2 (2014), Moana (2016), The Lego Batman Movie (2017), Thelma the Unicorn (2024), Minions & Monsters, and Wildwood (both 2026). In 2014, he made his directorial debut with What We Do in the Shadows, which he co-wrote, co-directed, and co-starred in with Taika Waititi. He later adapted the film into the FX television series What We Do in the Shadows (2019–2024).

== Early life ==
Jemaine Atea Mahana Clement was born on 10 January 1974 in Masterton in Wairarapa, and was raised there in a working-class family by his mother and grandmother Maikara with his two brothers. Clement is of Māori (Ngāti Kahungunu) descent through his mother, and a direct descendant of the rangatira (chief) Iraia Te Ama-o-te-rangi Te Whaiti, who is his great-great-great grandfather. His Pākehā father, Robert, was employed at the freezing works and struggled with alcoholism, leaving home when Clement was a child. Robert became a stained glass artist in Midhirst, Taranaki; Clement would later reconnect with his father as an adult and now enjoys a "strong and loving" relationship with him.

Clement's mother and grandmother were strong influences on him as a child, inspiring his sense of humour. Despite having a strong connection to his Māori ethnicity through visiting relatives regularly on trips to various marae, bans on the Māori language being spoken in schools meant Clement grew up in an almost entirely English-speaking environment. He has talked of his regrets about this and has emotionally spoken of the physical abuse his grandmother suffered at school for speaking te reo Māori.

He attended Makoura College in Masterton. After finishing school he moved to Wellington, where he studied drama and film at Victoria University of Wellington. There he met Taika Waititi, with whom he went on to form So You're a Man and The Humourbeasts. In 2004, the Humourbeasts toured New Zealand in a stage show titled The Untold Tales of Maui, a reworking of the traditional Maori legends of Māui. The duo received New Zealand's highest comedy honour, the Billy T Award. During his time in university, he also met Bret McKenzie, with whom he performed in Edinburgh, thus forming Flight of the Conchords.

== Career ==
=== Music ===
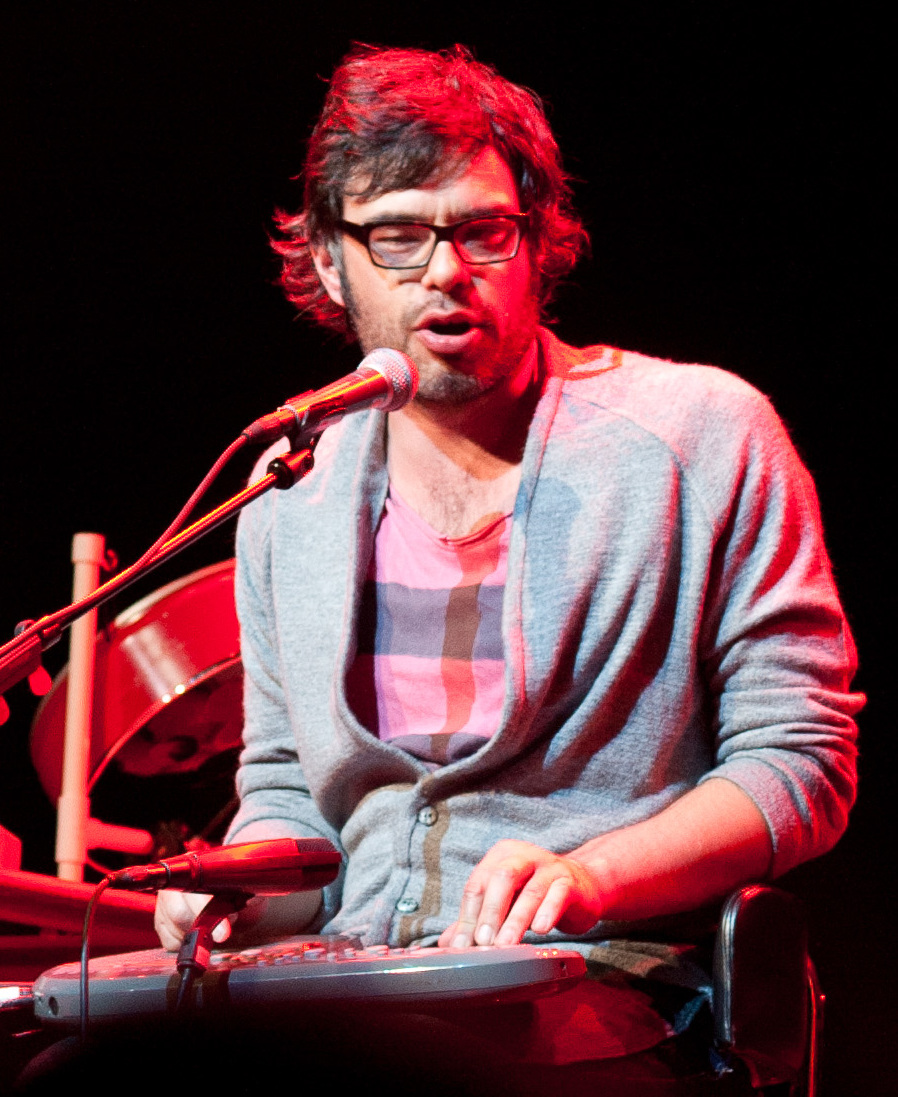
Clement in 2010

Clement and McKenzie have toured internationally and released four CDs: Folk the World Tour in 2002, The Distant Future EP in 2007 (winner of 2008 Grammy for Best Comedy Album), Flight of the Conchords in 2008 and I Told You I Was Freaky in 2009. In 2005 the Conchords produced Flight of the Conchords, a six-part comedy radio programme on BBC Radio 2. They appeared on Late Night with Conan O'Brien, the Late Show with David Letterman and The Late Late Show. After appearing in 2005 on HBO's One Night Stand, the Conchords were offered their own 12-part HBO series, Flight of the Conchords, which was based on their earlier BBC radio series. Its first season ran from June to September 2007, and was renewed for a second season, which aired on HBO in the US from January to March 2009. In December 2009, the Conchords announced the show would not have a third season.

=== Film and television ===
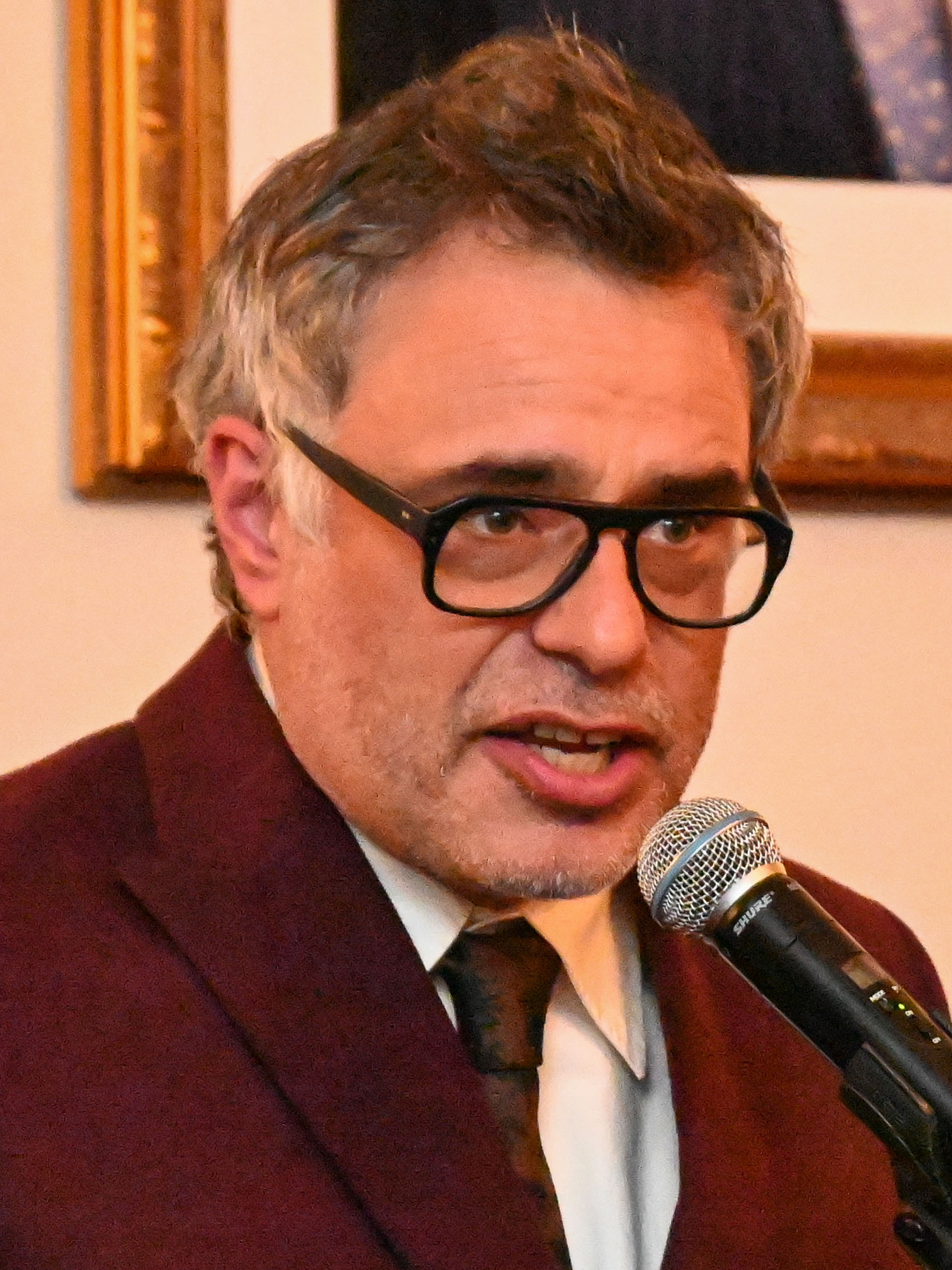
Clement in 2024

Clement has appeared in several feature films. His debut was in the kung fu comedy Tongan Ninja, directed by New Zealander Jason Stutter. He has worked with Stutter on two more films to date: the low budget ghost comedy Diagnosis: Death and the drama Predicament, based on the book by late New Zealand novelist Ronald Hugh Morrieson. Clement also has a role in American comedy Gentlemen Broncos, directed by Napoleon Dynamite's Jared Hess. This role landed him a nomination for the Independent Spirit Award for Best Supporting Male. Though Gentlemen Broncos was almost universally panned by critics, some singled out Clement's performance for praise. In 2010, he voiced Jerry in Despicable Me and appeared in the film Dinner for Schmucks. In 2011, he voiced Nigel in Rio, and in 2012 he appeared as the primary antagonist Boris the Animal in Men in Black 3. In 2012, Jemaine co-wrote, co-directed, and starred in a vampire mockumentary titled What We Do in the Shadows with Taika Waititi. It premiered at the Sundance Film Festival on 19 January 2014. He also reprised his role as Nigel in Rio 2.

Clement has starred in television commercials internationally and provided voiceovers for many others in New Zealand. On 5 February 2006, Outback Steakhouse began running a series of television commercials starring Clement during Super Bowl XL in which Clement pretends to be Australian and feigns an Australian accent. One of the long-running gags of Flight of the Conchords is the traditional rivalry between New Zealand and Australia and the differences between their accents. The campaign ended in July 2006.

Clement has been involved in award-winning radio work. In 1999, Clement was a Radio Awards Winner as writer for Trashed, for Channel Z, Wellington. In 2000, he was given a Special Radio Awards Commendation for The Sunglass Store.

Besides his television work on Flight of the Conchords, Clement was a writer and cast member of the television shows Skitz and Tellylaughs in New Zealand. Clement, with fellow Conchord member Bret McKenzie, guest starred as a pair of camp counselors in "Elementary School Musical", the season premiere of the 22nd season of The Simpsons, which aired on 26 September 2010.

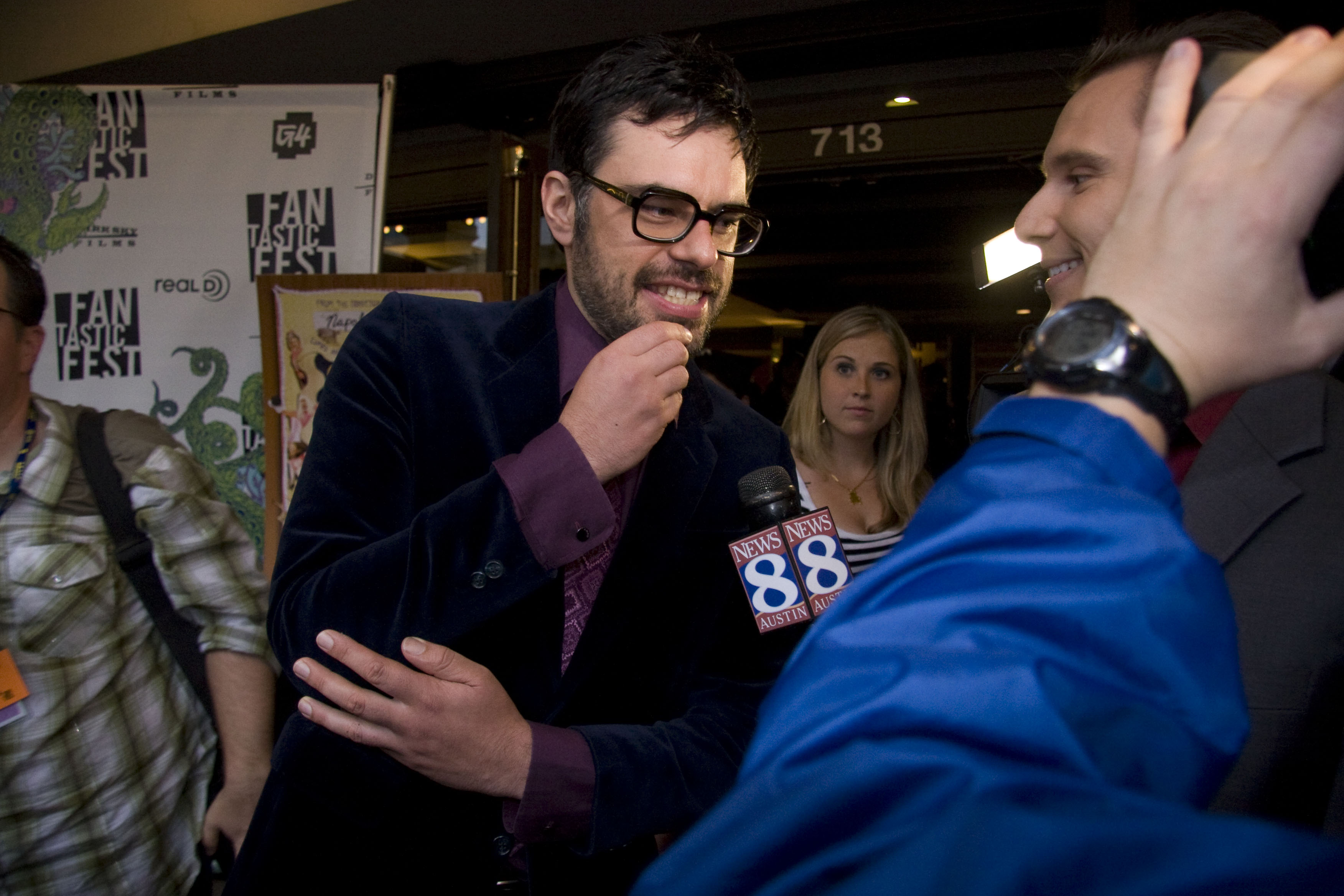
Clement at Fantastic Fest in 2009

Clement also played the role of a prisoner in a Russian gulag in the 2014 film Muppets Most Wanted, a sequel to The Muppets (2011).

Clement was featured as one of 2008's "100 Sexiest People" in a special edition of the Australian magazine Who. Fellow Conchord member McKenzie appeared on the same list.

In 2015, Clement voiced a "mind-reading fart" on an episode of the Adult Swim animated series Rick and Morty, where he performed the song "Goodbye Moonmen". Clement also starred in the independent film, People Places Things, which received positive reviews.

In 2016, Clement lent his voice to Tamatoa, a giant coconut crab, in the Disney animated film Moana, both in English, and the Māori dub. He based the character's voice on that of David Bowie.

In 2017, Clement played Oliver Bird in the FX TV series Legion. He also voiced Sauron in The Lego Batman Movie. In 2019, Clement played the role of a musician in the Belgian film Patrick. His character, a touring musician visiting a naturist camp, was one of the few characters in full clothes for the duration of the film. In 2024, he played a supporting role in the Australian television drama series Plum.

== Personal life ==
In August 2008, Clement married his longtime girlfriend, theatre actress and playwright Miranda Manasiadis. Their son, Sophocles Iraia, was born in October 2008 in New York City and is named after Manasiadis's Greek great-grandfather Sophocles, and Clement's ancestor Iraia Te Ama-o-te-rangi Te Whaiti. They live in Wellington.

== Filmography ==
Key
†	Denotes films that have not yet been released

=== Film ===
Year	Title	Role	Notes
2002	Tongan Ninja	Action Fighter (Marvin)	Also writer
2004	Futile Attraction	Editor	
2007	Eagle vs Shark	Jarrod	
2009	Gentlemen Broncos	Ronald Chevalier	Nominated — Independent Spirit Award for Best Supporting Male
2009	Diagnosis: Death	Garfield Olyphant	
2010	Despicable Me	Jerry the Minion	Voice role
2010	Predicament	Spook	
2010	Dinner for Schmucks	Kieran Vollard	
2011	Rio	Nigel	Voice role; Nominated — Annie Award for Voice Acting in a Feature Production
2012	Men in Black 3	Boris the Animal	Nominated — Teen Choice Award for Choice Movie Villain
2012	Rhys Darby: This Way to the Spaceship	Spaceship	Recorded voice role
2014	What We Do in the Shadows	Vladislav	Also director, writer and co-producer
2014	Muppets Most Wanted	Prison King	Cameo appearance
2014	Rio 2	Nigel	Voice role
2015	People Places Things	Will Henry	
2016	Ratchet & Clank	Dallas Wannamaker	Voice role
2016	The BFG	The Fleshlumpeater	Voice and motion capture
2016	Moana	Tamatoa	Voice role; also voiced the character in the 2017 Māori dub
2017	The Lego Batman Movie	Sauron	Voice cameo
2017	Humor Me	Nate Kroll	
2017	Brad's Status	Billy Wearsiter	
2018	An Evening with Beverly Luff Linn	Colin Keith Threadener	
2018	The Breaker Upperers	Tinder Date	Cameo appearance
2018	The Festival	Robin	
2019	Patrick	Dustin	
2020	I Used to Go Here	David Kirkpatrick	
2022	Nude Tuesday	Bjorg Rasmussen	
2022	Don't Make Me Go	Dale Angelo	Streaming film
2022	DC League of Super-Pets	Aquaman	Voice role
2022	Avatar: The Way of Water	Dr. Ian Garvin	
2023	The Moon Is Upside Down	MacIntosh	
2024	Thelma the Unicorn	Vic Diamond	Voice role; streaming film
2024	Harold and the Purple Crayon	Gary	
2024	Moana 2	Tamatoa	Voice cameo; Mid-credits scene
2025	A Minecraft Movie	Daryl, Voice of Bruce	Double role as Lead role and Voice role
2025	M3GAN 2.0	Alton Appleton	
2025	Avatar: Fire and Ash	Dr. Ian Garvin	
2026	Rogue Trooper	Mr. Brass	
2026	Moana	Tamatoa	Voice role; also contributed to the film's soundtrack
2026	I, Object	Pop	
2026	Wildwood	Roger Swindon	Voice role

=== Television ===
Year	Title	Role	Notes
1996	The Enid Blyton Adventure Series	MIS Guard	Episode: "Circus of Adventures"
2002	The Tribe	VR Cowboy No. 2	Episode #4.24
2007–2009	Flight of the Conchords	Himself	22 episodes Also co-creator, writer and executive producer
2008	The Drinky Crow Show	Alien	Voice role, 2 episodes
2009	Tim and Eric Awesome Show, Great Job!	Eric's Tennis Double	Episode: "Tennis"
2010	Radiradirah	Sheep	3 episodes
2010	The Simpsons	Ethan Ballantyne	Voice role, episode: "Elementary School Musical"
2012	Napoleon Dynamite	Professor Koontz	Voice role, episode: "Scantronica Love"
2013	Out There	Tenebres	Voices role, episode: "Enter Destiny"
2013	#7DaysLater	Ms. Lockett's Father	Voice role, episode: "Portrait"
2014	Short Poppies	—N/a	Director
2014–2016	TripTank	Sir Ian / Alistair / Caller / Erebos / Judge Bluetail / Man in Line	Voice role, 7 episodes
2015	Rick and Morty	Fart	Voice role, episode: "Mortynight Run"
2016	Regular Show	Ziggy	Voice role, episode: "California King"
2016	Inside Amy Schumer	DJ	Episode: "Psychopath Test"
2016	Divorce	Julian Renaut	6 episodes
2016–2018	Another Period	Father Black Donahue	4 episodes
2016–2019	Milo Murphy's Law	Orton Mahlson / Dr. Zone	Voices role, 5 episodes
2017–2019	Legion	Oliver Bird	14 episodes
2017	American Dad!	Magunga	Voice role, episode: "Bazooka Steve"
2017	Wrecked	Luther	3 episodes
2017	Robot Chicken	Narrator	Voice role, episode: "Freshly Baked: The Robot Chicken Santa Claus Pot Cookie Freakout Special: Special Edition"
2018–2022	Wellington Paranormal	Mobot	Voice role, episode: "Mobot"; Also co-creator, director, writer and executive producer
2018	We Bare Bears	Courtney	Voice role, episode: "Rescue Ranger"
2018	Flight of the Conchords: Live in London	Himself	Special; Also writer and producer
2019–2024	What We Do in the Shadows	Vladislav	Also co-creator, director, writer and executive producer 2 episodes
2019–present	Kiri and Lou	Lou	Voice role, main role
2019	Year of the Rabbit	Tall Man	Episode: "Framed Rabbit"
2020	Steven Universe Future	Kerry Moonbeam	Voice role, episode: "Mr. Universe"
2020–2022	Tig n' Seek	This Guy	Main voice role
2021	Big Mouth	Simon Sex	Voice role, episode: "Best Friends Make the Best Lovers"
2022–2023	Human Resources	Simon Sex	Voice role, 2 episodes
2023	Koala Man	Principal Bazwell	Main voice role
2024	Time Bandits	Pure Evil	Also co-writer, executive producer, and director of several episodes
2026	Alice and Steve	Steve	

=== Theater ===
Year	Title	Role	Notes
2024	The Rover (Studio 77)	Himself	Episode: "The Rover"

== Discography ==
Year	Title	Notes
2002	Folk the World Tour	Flight of the Conchords
2007	The Distant Future	Flight of the Conchords
2008	Flight of the Conchords	Flight of the Conchords
2009	I Told You I Was Freaky	Flight of the Conchords
2011	"Pretty Bird"	Rio soundtrack
2014	"I Will Survive"	Rio 2 soundtrack
2016	"Shiny"	Moana soundtrack
2018	"Goodbye Moonmen"	Rick and Morty soundtrack
2019	Live in London	Flight of the Conchords
2020	"Mr. Universe"	Steven Universe Future
2025	"Cold Iron"	The Crooked Moon soundtrack

== Radio ==
Year	Title	Role	Notes
2005	Flight of the Conchords	Jemaine	Also writer
2016	The Mysterious Secrets Of Uncle Bertie's Botanarium	Lord Joseph Banks	Podcast

== Awards and nominations ==
Award	Year (Note: Indicates the year of ceremony. Each year is linked to the article about the awards held that year, wherever possible.)	Nominated work	Category	Result	Ref.
Annie Awards	2010	The Simpsons: "Elementary School Musical"	Music in a Television Production	Nominated	
Annie Awards	2011	Rio	Voice Acting in a Feature Production	Nominated	
Emmy Awards	2008	"Yoko"	Outstanding Writing for a Comedy Series	Nominated	
Emmy Awards	2008	"Inner City Pressure"	Outstanding Original Music and Lyrics	Nominated	
Emmy Awards	2008	"The Most Beautiful Girl (In the Room)"	Outstanding Original Music and Lyrics	Nominated	
Emmy Awards	2009	Flight of the Conchords	Outstanding Comedy Series	Nominated	
Emmy Awards	2009	Flight of the Conchords	Outstanding Lead Actor in a Comedy Series	Nominated	
Emmy Awards	2009	"Prime Minister"	Outstanding Writing for a Comedy Series	Nominated	
Emmy Awards	2009	"Carol Brown"	Outstanding Original Music and Lyrics	Nominated	
Emmy Awards	2019	"Father & Son"	Outstanding Original Music and Lyrics	Nominated	
Emmy Awards	2020	What We Do in the Shadows	Outstanding Comedy Series	Nominated	
Emmy Awards	2022	What We Do in the Shadows	Outstanding Comedy Series	Nominated	
Grammy Awards	2007	The Distant Future	Best Comedy Album	Won	
Grammy Awards	2008	Flight of the Conchords	Best Comedy Album	Nominated	
Grammy Awards	2010	I Told You I Was Freaky	Best Comedy Album	Nominated	
New Zealand Music Awards	2008	Flight of the Conchords	Album of the Year	Won	
New Zealand Music Awards	2008	Flight of the Conchords	Best Group	Won	
New Zealand Music Awards	2008	Flight of the Conchords	Breakthrough Artist of the Year	Won	
New Zealand Music Awards	2008	Flight of the Conchords	International Achievement	Won	
New Zealand Music Awards	2013	"Feel Inside (And Stuff Like That)"	Highest Selling New Zealand Single	Won	
New Zealand Television Awards	2019	Wellington Paranormal	Best Script: Comedy	Nominated	
Nickelodeon Australian Kids' Choice Awards	2008	Flight of the Conchords	Funniest Duo	Nominated	
Satellite Awards	2007	Flight of the Conchords	Best Television Series – Musical or Comedy	Nominated	
Satellite Awards	2009	Flight of the Conchords	Best Television Series – Musical or Comedy	Nominated	
Satellite Awards	2009	Flight of the Conchords	Best Actor – Television Series Musical or Comedy	Nominated	
TCA Awards	2008	Flight of the Conchords	Outstanding Achievement in Comedy	Nominated	
TCA Awards	2008	Flight of the Conchords	Outstanding New Program	Nominated	
Teen Choice Awards	2012	Men in Black 3	Choice Movie Villain	Nominated	
Writers Guild of America Awards	2007	Flight of the Conchords	Comedy Series	Nominated	
Writers Guild of America Awards	2007	Flight of the Conchords	New Series	Nominated	
Writers Guild of America Awards	2007	"Sally Returns"	Episodic Comedy	Nominated	
Writers Guild of America Awards	2019	What We Do in the Shadows	New Series	Nominated	
