= Louis Baker =

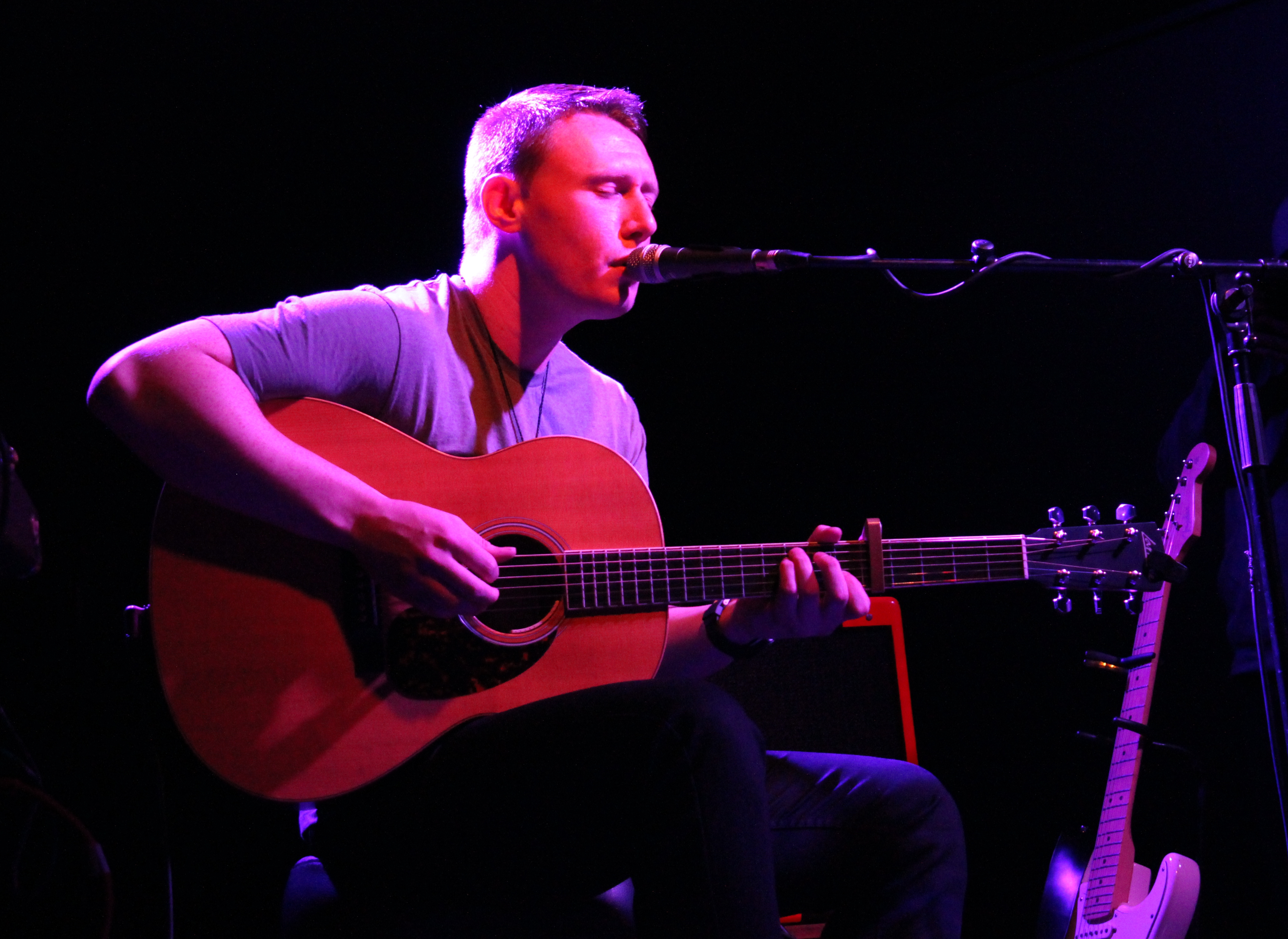
- Louis Baker photographed in 2019.

Background information
- Born: c.1989 Newtown, Wellington
- Genres: Folk; soul; Blue-eyed soul; Neo soul
- Occupations: Musician; singer; songwriter
- Instruments: Vocals; guitar; bass guitar; drums; percussion
- Years active: 2013–present
- Label: Aston Road
- Website: www.louisbaker.co.nz

Louis Baker (born circa 1989 in Newtown, Wellington) is a New Zealand soul musician and singer-songwriter, best known for his live shows and singles (Rainbow, Black Crow and Addict) leading into his debut album (Open), released in 2019. One of Wellington and New Zealand's highest profile independent artists, he has seen success both locally and internationally.

Baker was born and raised in the suburb of Newtown in Wellington, Baker began writing songs at age 11, and at age 17 was a finalist in a national songwriting competition. In 2014, he recorded his self-titled EP in North London with Andy Lovegrove, who has produced for Breaks Co-Op and Supergrass. The EP reached No. 3 on the New Zealand Albums chart, and was well received critically. Baker's music has been influenced by the diverse culture of Wellington, especially Newtown, and acts such as Fat Freddy's Drop and Trinity Roots.

== Early life ==
Louis Baker grew up in a "tight-knit" working-class Ngāpuhi family in Coromandel Street, Newtown, and has two sisters. His mother worked in cleaning jobs before eventually starting an art teaching business, and his father has worked as a firefighter for 43 years in the nearby suburb of Brooklyn. He was heavily influenced by American musicians growing up, such as Marvin Gaye and Curtis Mayfield, as well as dub and reggae music as part of a cultural renaissance in Wellington in the 2000s, with acts such as Fat Freddy's Drop and Trinity Roots becoming successful.

Baker spoke of his childhood in an interview with fondness, saying "I remember a honeysuckle tree and sucking the ends of the flowers, dancing in the living room to Michael Jackson. I remember listening to Rubber Soul, by the Beatles, on vinyl. It was me, my sister and my Mum and my Dad. We had a huge oak tree where in Autumn the leaves would form a huge pile on the ground and as kids, we’d run and dive into them."

At the age of 17 Baker entered Play It Strange, a national songwriting competition organised by Split Enz's Mike Chunn. His first song, 'Three Ladies', was dedicated to the experiences of his mother and two sisters. The track saw him place top five, with his prize being an acoustic guitar that he still records and travels with today.

== Career ==
From 2010 – 2014, Baker was part of nine piece Neo-Soul, Experimental, Hip-Hop collective Brockaflower Saurus Rex. With a reputation for energetic and infectious live shows, the band self-released their debut album, (Build It) in 2014.

Originally desiring to be a cricket player, Baker gave up the sport before he started at university, quipping that he "got worse and worse because music took over". Baker studied a BMus Jazz Performance degree at Victoria University of Wellington, and, in 2012, won a scholarship to the Red Bull Music Academy in New York City, the programme, of which only 60 candidates out of 4,000 were selected, saw Baker have a studio session with Just Blaze and included lectures from Brian Eno, Questlove, and Q-Tip of A Tribe Called Quest.

He spent the summer following his time at the Red Bull Academy in London, and recorded his debut EP, producing a standalone single 'Even in the Darkness', and 5 other tracks. They sparked critical acclaim in New Zealand, and led Baker to be nominated for the APRA Silver Scroll for his song 'Back on My Feet'. From 2014 onwards Baker released a number of singles (including a collaboration with Jordan Rakei) and then found greater stardom with his track Rainbow. Written in Wellington and recorded at the Red Bull Studios in England with The Nextmen's Brad Ellis it performed well on the NZ charts, and on Spotify, and was critically acclaimed in New Zealand and overseas. Rainbow was followed up by the singles Fade, Gave it All Away, Addict and Black Crow, in which Baker demonstrated his "introspective, "honest" and sincere" songwriting skills and "soulful crooning"

His debut album, Open, was released in 2019 to critical acclaim along with nominations for Best Soul / RnB Artist and Te Māngai Pāho Best Māori Artist at the 2019 New Zealand Music Awards. It was one of ten finalists in the 2020 Taite Music Prize. The lead single from the album, The People, speaks to peace and unity, and was written before the Australian-committed Christchurch mosque shootings. Baker spoke of the song's place in the aftermath of the tragedy; "We’re living in uncertain times. I hope people choose love over fear more and more."

== Personal life ==
Baker lives in Wellington. He also works as a mentor for the NZ Music Commission, Mentoring in Schools programme.

== Discography ==
=== Studio albums ===
List of studio albums, with selected details
Title	Details	Peak chart positions
Title	Details	NZ
Open	Released: June 2019; Format: LP, digital; Label: Louis Baker (LB001)	—
Trouble	Released: 9 October 2026; Format: digital; Label: Louis Baker	12

=== Extended plays ===
List of EPs, with selected details
Title	Details	Peak chart positions
Title	Details	NZ
Louis Baker	Released: March 2014; Format: CD, Digital; Label: Louis Baker (LBKR01)	8
Love Levitates	Released: June 2021; Format: Digital; Label: Louis Baker	—
Medicine	Released: October 2024; Format: LP, Digital; Label: Louis Baker	39

== Awards and nominations ==
- 2007: Play It Strange – Top 5 Finalist
- 2009: Primal Youth National Songwriting Competition – 1st
- 2014: APRA Silver Scroll award – Top 5 Finalist / Back on My Feet
- 2016: APRA Silver Scroll award – Top 20 / Rainbow
- 2018: ISC Comp, Singer-Songwriter Top 12
- 2018: APRA Silver Scroll award – Top 20 / Black Crow
- 2019: New Zealand Music Awards – Best Soul / RnB Artist (Nominee)
- 2019: New Zealand Music Awards – Te Māngai Pāho Best Māori Artist (Nominee)
- 2020: Taite Music Prize – Finalist

== See also ==
- Music of New Zealand
