= Nigel Collins (musician) =

New Zealand musician, actor, playwright

- Origin: New Zealand
- Occupations: Musician, Actor and Playwright

Nigel Collins is a New Zealand musician, actor and playwright. A long time collaborator of Bret McKenzie and Jemaine Clement of Flight of the Conchords, he appears in their live shows as a string section of one, 'The New Zealand Sympathy Orchestra' playing cello, and also bass, keyboards, percussion, drums and singing backing vocals. He's featured in tours of North America, the UK, Europe, Australia and New Zealand from 2001 to 2018. Collins graduated from Toi Whakaari: New Zealand Drama School in 1999 with a Bachelor of Performing Arts (Acting).

He was a founding member of the Wellington International Ukulele Orchestra (also featuring Bret McKenzie), recording and touring with the band in New Zealand, the UK and Australia from 2006 - 2013 and generating a series of best-selling EPs. He contributed lead vocals to their versions of Toto's Africa and Jose Feliciano's Feliz Navidad.

A new recording project with Wellington songwriting collective Congress of Animals began in 2016, with Fly My Pretties' Justin Firefly Clarke and Age Pryor (also from the Wellington International Ukulele Orchestra) and Ben Lemi of Trinity Roots. Recordings from the project released in 2018 include his song Depends on you.

Other music collaborations include cello on Ed Sheeran's I See Fire, Fat Freddies Drop's Based On a True Story, Age Pryor's City Chorus and David Yetton's (The Stereo Bus) Blow out your candles.

His play Wheeler's Luck, co-written with actor Toby Leach and director Damon Andrews, was performed by Collins and Leach in New Zealand, the UK and Australia between 2004 and 2007, and has since become a staple of the New Zealand high school drama and youth theatre curriculum, with 50 schools mounting productions of the piece.
