= Aotearoa Music Awards for Highest Selling New Zealand Artist =

Annual New Zealand music award

The Highest Selling New Zealand Artist is an Aotearoa Music Awards award which is presented annually to the New Zealand artist with the highest sales in the awards period. The awards are presented annually by Recorded Music NZ at the annual New Zealand Music Awards. Nominations are not normally announced in this category. Before 2018, the Highest Selling New Zealand Album and Highest Selling New Zealand Single awards were presented.

== Highest Selling New Zealand Album ==
Year	Winner	Album	Ref.
2003	Bic Runga	Beautiful Collision	
2004	Hayley Westenra	Pure	
2005	Yulia	Into the West	
2006	Fat Freddy's Drop	Based on a True Story	
2007	Brooke Fraser	Albertine	
2008	Opshop	Second Hand Planet	
2009	The Feelers	The Best of: '98–'08	
2010	Gin Wigmore	Holy Smoke	
2011	Brooke Fraser	Flags	
2012	Six60	Six60	
2013	Peter Posa	White Rabbit: The Very Best of Peter Posa	
2014	Sol3 Mio	Sol3 Mio	
2015	Sol3 Mio	Sol3 Mio	
2016	Sol3 Mio	On Another Note	

- While nominees are not normally announced for this category, in 2015 nominees were included. The non-winning nominees for 2015 were: Broods – Evergreen, Devilskin – We Rise, Lorde – Pure Heroine and Six60 – Six60.

== Highest Selling New Zealand Single ==
Year	Winner	Album	Ref.
2003	Katchafire	"Giddy Up"	
2004	Ben Lummis	"They Can't Take That Away"	
2005	Dei Hamo	"We Gon' Ride"	
2006	Rosita Vai	"All I Ask"	
2007	Atlas	"Crawl"	
2008	Opshop	"One Day"	
2009	Smashproof featuring Gin Wigmore	"Brother"	
2010	Stan Walker	"Black Box"	
2011	Brooke Fraser	"Something in the Water"	
2012	Six60	"Don't Forget Your Roots"	
2013	Flight of the Conchords	"Feel Inside (And Stuff Like That)"	
2014	Lorde	"Royals"	
2015	Savage and Timmy Trumpet	"Freaks"	
2016	Six60	"White Lines"	

- While nominees are not normally announced for this category, in 2015 nominees were included. The non-winning nominees for 2015 were: Broods – "Mother & Father", Lorde – "Yellow Flicker Beat", Six60 – "Special" and Six60 – "So High".
