= Bret McKenzie =

New Zealand actor and musician (born 1976)

Bret McKenzie ONZM
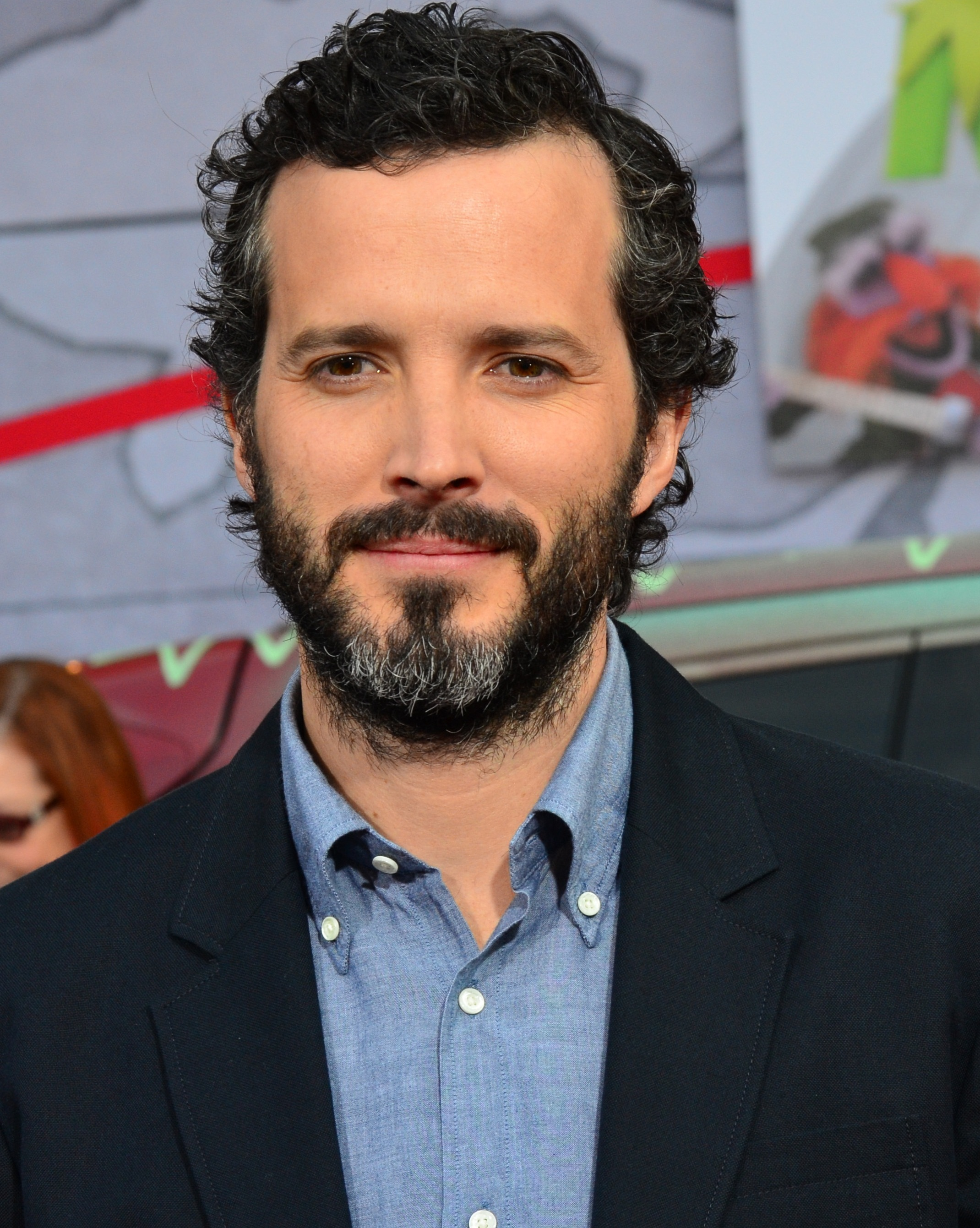
- McKenzie at the Muppets Most Wanted premiere on 11 March 2014

Background information
- Also known as: Rhymenoceros
- Born: Bret Peter Tarrant McKenzie; 29 June 1976 (age 50); Wellington, New Zealand
- Genres: Comedy; folk; acoustic
- Occupations: Musician; songwriter; comedian; actor; music supervisor
- Instruments: Guitar; keyboard; bass guitar; drums; vocals; ukulele
- Years active: 1994–present
- Label: Sub Pop
- Member of: Flight of the Conchords
- Relatives: Deirdre Tarrant (mother); Peter McKenzie (father)

Bret Peter Tarrant McKenzie ONZM (born 29 June 1976) is a New Zealand musician, comedian, music supervisor, and actor. He is best known as one half of musical comedy duo Flight of the Conchords along with Jemaine Clement. In the 2000s, the duo's comedy and music became the basis of a BBC radio series and then an oft-lauded American television series, which aired for two seasons on HBO. Active since 1998, the duo released their most recent comedy special, Live in London, in 2018.

Primarily a musician, McKenzie has worked as a songwriter and music supervisor for film and television since the 2010s. He served as music supervisor for two Muppet films, The Muppets (2011) and Muppets Most Wanted (2014), the former of which won him an Academy Award for Best Original Song for the song "Man or Muppet". In the 2000s, McKenzie was part of reggae fusion band The Black Seeds and Wellington International Ukulele Orchestra, and, in the 2010s, he began performing solo material. His debut album Songs Without Jokes was released in August 2022.

As an actor, he portrayed elves in Peter Jackson's The Lord of the Rings and The Hobbit film trilogies: in the first he remained unnamed with fans naming him Figwit, a character originally cast as an extra who gained attention thanks to the trilogy's fan community. He later appears in The Hobbit as Lindir, a minor character who originally appears in the book of The Fellowship of the Ring.

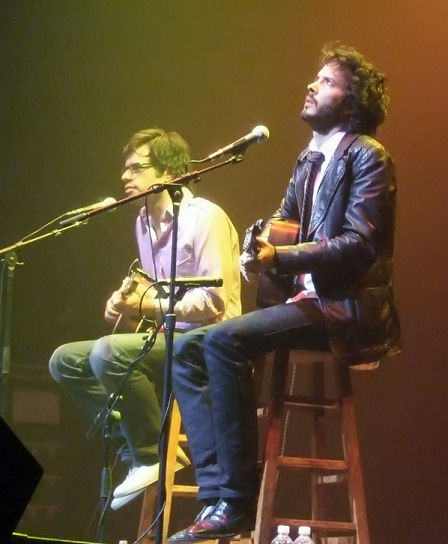
Bret McKenzie with collaborator Jemaine Clement performing as Flight of the Conchords in 2007

== Early life ==
McKenzie was born in Wellington to Peter McKenzie, a part-time actor, and Deirdre Tarrant, a contemporary dance teacher. He was raised in Kelburn with his brothers Justin and Jonny. McKenzie attended Clifton Terrace Model School between 1982 and 1987 ("model" refers to a standard school for training teachers as opposed to modelling). His classmates at the school included Antonia Prebble and Age Pryor.

McKenzie then went on to Wellington College where he was a prefect and won the Wellington regional heats of the Smokefree Rockquest with his jazz and funk band, The Blue Samanthas.

== Career ==
=== Flight of the Conchords ===
While studying at Victoria University of Wellington, McKenzie met Jemaine Clement, a fellow student who was also studying film and theatre. They didn't complete their degrees but ended up living together and first were members of So You're a Man, and then later forming Flight of the Conchords.

As Flight of the Conchords they have toured internationally and released four CDs: Folk the World Tour in 2002,The Distant Future (which won the Grammy Award for Best Comedy Album) in 2007, the Grammy nominated Flight of the Conchords in 2008, and I Told You I Was Freaky in 2009. The Conchords produced a six-part improvisational comedy radio programme for the BBC and have appeared on Late Night with Conan O'Brien, the Late Show with David Letterman and The Late Late Show with Craig Ferguson.

After a successful appearance in 2005 on HBOs One Night Stand, the Conchords were offered their own 12-part HBO series Flight of the Conchords. Its first season ran from June to September 2007, and its second season premiered on HBO 18 January 2009. Along with Clement, McKenzie was featured as 2007 Salon "Sexiest Man Living" and 2008's "100 Sexiest People" in a special edition of the Australian magazine Who. More recently, the duo toured in 2012, 2016, and 2018.

=== Acting ===
McKenzie has acted periodically since making his professional acting debut in 2000, a small role in the UK series Dark Knight which was filmed in Wellington. Outside the Flight of the Conchords television adaption, he is most notable for his appearances in the first and third films in Peter Jackson's The Lord of the Rings trilogy. His silent role in the first film as Figwit achieved some minor internet fame, which led to Jackson giving him a line in the third film. His father Peter McKenzie played the role of Elendil in Lord of the Rings. In April 2011, McKenzie was cast as the elf Lindir for The Hobbit.

McKenzie, together with Australian comedian Hamish Blake, starred in a New Zealand feature film, Two Little Boys, finished in late 2011 and released in New Zealand in March 2012. He had a supporting role in the 2013 film Austenland.

Guest starring roles include him and fellow Conchord Clement as a pair of camp counselors in "Elementary School Musical", the season premiere of the 22nd season of The Simpsons, which aired on 26 September 2010, and other comedies.

=== Music and songwriting for screen ===
McKenzie has contributed to a number of projects outside of Flight of the Conchords. In the late 1990s, McKenzie joined the reggae fusion group The Black Seeds; he put out four albums with band before leaving around 2007. The Black Seeds had some minor radio hits during his tenure, and continue to be regionally successful. In the mid-2000s, he released music under the name The Video Kid, including his album Prototype. In 2005, he helped form the Wellington International Ukulele Orchestra which was active into the 2010s.

In the late 2010s, he began writing and recording solo material again, and later toured New Zealand in 2018 with a collective that included musicians Age Pryor and Nigel Collins.

During the summer of 2010, McKenzie flew to Los Angeles to serve as the music supervisor for The Muppets. He went on to write four of the five original songs from the film's soundtrack including "Man or Muppet" and "Life's a Happy Song" both of which were nominated for Broadcast Film Critics Association Awards and Satellite Awards for Best Original Song. At the 84th Academy Awards in 2012 his song, "Man or Muppet", won the Academy Award for Best Original Song.

McKenzie then wrote the original songs for the 2014 movie Muppets Most Wanted, as well as songs for other children's films like The Pirates! Band of Misfits and Dora and the Lost City of Gold. Other credits include the 2016 Sainsbury's Christmas advert featuring James Corden on vocals. He has written songs for The Simpsons on numerous occasions.

McKenzie released his debut solo album, Songs Without Jokes, on Sub Pop in August 2022. The release will be followed with an extensive tour in New Zealand, Great Britain, Ireland, and North America. The album is inspired by the songwriting of Steely Dan, Randy Newman, and Harry Nilsson.

== Personal life ==
He is married to New Zealand publicist Hannah Clarke and currently maintains residences in Los Angeles, New York City, and Wellington. They have three children and mainly live in Wellington.

In the 2012 Queen's Birthday and Diamond Jubilee Honours, McKenzie was appointed an Officer of the New Zealand Order of Merit, for services to music and film.

== Filmography ==
=== Flight of the Conchords ===
Year	Title	Format	Notes
2004	Stand Up!	TV series	ABC TV comedy series
2005	The BBC Radio Series: Flight of the Conchords	Radio	Broadcast 2005; released 2006
2005	One Night Stand: Flight of the Conchords		HBO half-hour comedy special
2006	Flight of the Conchords: A Texan Odyssey		TV3 documentary; also producer
2007–2009	Flight of the Conchords	TV series	Also creator, co-writer, and executive producer
2009	Flight of the Conchords: On Air		NZ On Air documentary
2018	Flight of the Conchords: Live in London	TV special	TV special; Also writer and producer

=== As actor ===
Year	Title	Role	Format	Notes
2001	The Lord of the Rings: The Fellowship of the Ring	Elf Escort	Film	Commonly known as "Figwit".
2003	The Lord of the Rings: The Return of the King	Elf Escort	Film	Commonly known as "Figwit".
2008	The Drinky Crow Show	Rob, the Alien (voice)	TV series	2 episodes
2009	Tim and Eric Awesome Show, Great Job!	Tim's Tennis Double	TV series	Episode: "Tennis"
2009	Bro'Town	Voice	TV series	
2009	Diagnosis Death	Dr. Cruise	Film	
2010	The Simpsons	Kurt Hardwick (voice)	TV series	Episode: "Elementary School Musical"
2012	Outback	Hamish (voice)	Film	
2012	Two Little Boys	Nige	Film	
2012	The Hobbit: An Unexpected Journey	Lindir	Film	Cameo
2013	Austenland	Martin	Film	
2017	Bajillion Dollar Propertie$	Huck	TV series	Episode: "Looking Forward"
2021	Luca	—N/a	Film	Additional story contributions
2025	Anchor Me: The Don McGlashan Story	Himself	Film	Documentary
2025	The Horne Section	Himself	TV Series	
2025	Firebuds	Uncle Hugh (voice)	TV series	
2026	New Zealand Spy	Boss	TV series	Also writer
2026	Guy Montgomery's Guy Mont-Spelling Bee	Himself	TV series	Series 3, Episode 7

=== As composer and music director ===
Year	Title	Format	Notes
2010–2025	The Simpsons	TV series	Songwriter for the episodes "Elementary School Musical," "Friend with Benefit," "Panic on the Streets of Springfield," "Homer's Adventures Through the Windshield Glass," and "The Flandshees of Innersimpson."
2011	The Muppets	Film	Music supervisor and writer of original songs Academy Award for Best Original Song
2014	Muppets Most Wanted	Film	Music supervisor and original songwriter
2016	Sainsbury's: The Greatest Gift	Short	Composer
2019	Dora and the Lost City of Gold	Film	Writer and producer: "Hooray! We Did It"
2025	Plankton: The Movie	Film	Original songwriter
2025	A Minecraft Movie	Film	Original songwriter and performer
TBA	Bob the Musical	Film	Songwriter
TBA	Moonland	Film	Writer, songwriter
TBA	Emmet Otter's Jug-Band Christmas	Film	Writer, songwriter

== Discography ==
=== Solo ===
- Prototype (2004) (as The Video Kid)
- Songs Without Jokes (2022) – No. 40 New Zealand
- Freak Out City (2025)

=== Collaborative ===
The Black Seeds

- Keep On Pushing (2001)
- On the Sun (2004)
- Into the Dojo (2006)
- Sometimes Enough EP (2007)

Flight of the Conchords

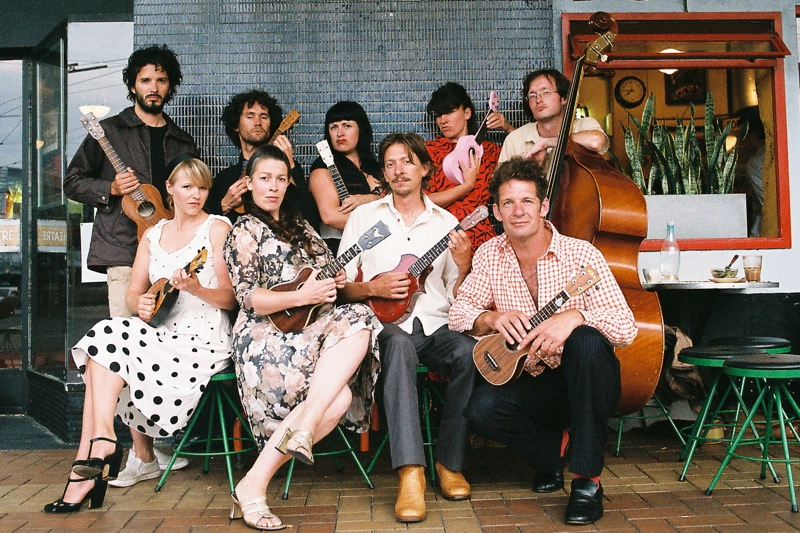
Wellington International Ukulele Orchestra in 2008 outside Delux Cafe in Wellington. McKenzie on the far left.

- Folk the World Tour (2002)
- The Distant Future (2007)
- Flight of the Conchords (2008)
- I Told You I Was Freaky (2009)
- Live in London (2019)

Wellington International Ukulele Orchestra

- The Heartache EP (2007)
- A Little Bit Wonderful EP (2008)
- The Dreaming EP (2009)
- I Love You... EP (2010)

== Awards and nominations ==
Award	Year (Note: Indicates the year of ceremony. Each year is linked to the article about the awards held that year, wherever possible.)	Recipient(s) and nominee(s)	Category	Result	Ref.
Academy Awards	2011	Bret McKenzie for "Man or Muppet" from The Muppets	Best Original Song	Won	
Annie Awards	2010	Tim Long, Alf Clausen, Jemaine Clement and Bret McKenzie for The Simpsons: Elementary School Musical	Music in a Television Production	Nominated	
Critics' Choice Movie Awards	2011	Bret McKenzie for "Life's a Happy Song" from The Muppets	Best Song	Won	
Critics' Choice Movie Awards	2011	Bret McKenzie for "Man or Muppet" from The Muppets	Best Song	Nominated	
Emmy Awards	2008	James Bobin, Jemaine Clement and Bret McKenzie for "Yoko"	Outstanding Writing for a Comedy Series	Nominated	
Emmy Awards	2008	Bret McKenzie, Jemaine Clement and James Bobin for "Inner City Pressure"	Outstanding Original Music and Lyrics	Nominated	
Emmy Awards	2008	Bret McKenzie and Jemaine Clement for "The Most Beautiful Girl (In the Room)"	Outstanding Original Music and Lyrics	Nominated	
Emmy Awards	2009	Stu Smiley, James Bobin, Troy Miller, Jemaine Clement, Bret McKenzie, Tracey Baird and Anna Dozoka for Flight of the Conchords	Outstanding Comedy Series	Nominated	
Emmy Awards	2009	James Bobin, Jemaine Clement and Bret McKenzie for "Prime Minister"	Outstanding Writing for a Comedy Series	Nominated	
Emmy Awards	2009	James Bobin, Bret McKenzie and Jemaine Clement for "Carol Brown"	Outstanding Original Music and Lyrics	Nominated	
Emmy Awards	2019	Bret McKenzie and Jemaine Clement for "Father & Son"	Outstanding Original Music and Lyrics	Nominated	
Grammy Awards	2007	Flight of the Conchords for The Distant Future	Best Comedy Album	Won	
Grammy Awards	2008	Flight of the Conchords for Flight of the Conchords	Best Comedy Album	Nominated	
Grammy Awards	2010	Flight of the Conchords for I Told You I Was Freaky	Best Comedy Album	Nominated	
Grammy Awards	2012	Bret McKenzie for "Man or Muppet" from The Muppets	Best Song Written for Visual Media	Nominated	
Hollywood Music in Media Awards	2014	Bret McKenzie for "I'll Get You What You Want (Cockatoo in Malibu)"	Best Original Song in a Feature Film	Nominated	
New Zealand Film Awards	2012	Bret McKenzie in Two Little Boys	Best Actor	Nominated	
New Zealand Music Awards	2008	Flight of the Conchords for Flight of the Conchords	Album of the Year	Won	
New Zealand Music Awards	2008	Flight of the Conchords for Flight of the Conchords	Best Group	Won	
New Zealand Music Awards	2008	Flight of the Conchords for Flight of the Conchords	Breakthrough Artist of the Year	Won	
New Zealand Music Awards	2008	Flight of the Conchords	International Achievement	Won	
New Zealand Music Awards	2013	Flight of the Conchords for "Feel Inside (And Stuff Like That)"	Highest Selling New Zealand Single	Won	
Nickelodeon Australian Kids' Choice Awards	2008	Flight of the Conchords	Funniest Duo	Nominated	
Satellite Awards	2007	Flight of the Conchords	Best Television Series – Musical or Comedy	Nominated	
Satellite Awards	2009	Flight of the Conchords	Best Television Series – Musical or Comedy	Nominated	
Satellite Awards	2011	"Life's a Happy Song" from The Muppets	Best Original Song	Nominated	
Satellite Awards	2011	"Man or Muppet" from The Muppets	Best Original Song	Nominated	
Satellite Awards	2014	"I'll Get You What You Want (Cockatoo in Malibu)" from Muppets Most Wanted	Best Original Song	Nominated	
TCA Awards	2008	Flight of the Conchords	Outstanding Achievement in Comedy	Nominated	
TCA Awards	2008	Flight of the Conchords	Outstanding New Program	Nominated	
Writers Guild of America Awards	2007	Damon Beesley, James Bobin, Jemaine Clement, Eric Kaplan, Bret McKenzie, Iain Morris, Duncan Sarkies, Pauls Simms, and Taika Waititi for Flight of the Conchords	Comedy Series	Nominated	
Writers Guild of America Awards	2007	Damon Beesley, James Bobin, Jemaine Clement, Eric Kaplan, Bret McKenzie, Iain Morris, Duncan Sarkies, Pauls Simms, and Taika Waititi for Flight of the Conchords	New Series	Nominated	
Writers Guild of America Awards	2007	James Bobin, Jemaine Clement and Bret McKenzie for "Sally Returns"	Episodic Comedy	Nominated	
