= Flight of the Conchords (radio series) =

2005 BBC radio series

The BBC Radio Series: Flight of the Conchords

Studio album by Flight of the Conchords
- Released: 1 May 2006
- Recorded: September 2005
- Genre: Comedy rock
- Label: BBC
- Producer: Will Saunders

Flight of the Conchords chronology
Folk the World Tour (2002)	The BBC Radio Series: Flight of the Conchords (2006)	The Distant Future (2007)

Flight of the Conchords is a radio series broadcast on BBC Radio 2 in 2005, starring the New Zealand musical comedy duo Flight of the Conchords. A three-CD set containing all the episodes was released in 2006 by the BBC. Each disc consisted of two episodes.

At the 2006 Sony Radio Academy Awards, the series won bronze in the Comedy Award. The later HBO television series of the same name was a spin-off from this radio series.

The series is frequently repeated on BBC Radio 4 Extra.

A Director's Cut release was planned by BBC, which was set to include "outtakes and full-length songs from the duo", and was initially set to be released on 13 November 2008 and was available for pre-order from the BBC Shop. However, the release date was then pushed back to 31 December 2009 and later 31 December 2010. The title has not been released, and the BBC Shop eventually removed their product page for the item.

== Credits ==
- Performers: Jemaine Clement, Bret McKenzie, Rhys Darby and Neil Finn
- Presenter: Rob Brydon
- Producer: Will Saunders
- Writers: Joel Morris, Jemaine Clement, Bret McKenzie, Rhys Darby
- Music: Bret McKenzie, Jemaine Clement, Mark Allis, David Catlin-Birch, Anna-Maria La Spina
- Sound: Nigel Acheson, Clair Wordsworth, Neil Pickles, Chris Morris, Rob Capocchi
- Broadcast Assistant: Hayley Nathan

== Episode listing ==
=== Episode 1 – Tower of London ===
1. Hello, I'm Rob Brydon
2. Think Think About It
3. Mikey's Flat
4. Flat Tour
5. Brian Books a Gig
6. Band Meeting #1
7. Frodo
8. The Tower of London
9. Brian and Neil #1
10. Is That an Arrow?
- Guest Performers: Mike Sengelow, Andy Parsons
- Songs: "Think About It, Think, Think About It" (aka "Junkies with Monkeys"); "Frodo, Don't Wear The Ring"

=== Episode 2 – Dan & the Panda ===
1. Hello, I'm Rob Brydon
2. Bowie
3. My Name's Tim
4. The Room Incident
5. Brian and Craig
6. Body Image
7. Bernard from EMI
8. You Got It Goin On
9. Brian and Neil #2
10. The Confession
- Guest Performers: Dan Antopolski, Daniel Kitson
- Songs: "Bowie", "Hiphopopotomus & Rhymenocerus", "You Got It Goin On", "Business Time"

=== Episode 3 – The Fans Proposition ===
1. Hello, I'm Rob Brydon
2. Click on This One
3. Orange Dinosaur Slide
4. Contest Winners
5. Sing for Supper
6. Photo Book
7. Anything Tri
8. Band Meeting #2
9. Guys!!!
10. Trevor Is Angry
- Guest Performers: Nina Conti, Jimmy Carr
- Songs: "Jenny", "Ladies Of The World", "A Kiss Is Not A Contract"

=== Episode 4 – Pop Song ===
1. Hello, I'm Rob Brydon
2. Bret Sets Off for a Pie
3. Business Time
4. Brian Can Barely Contain Himself
5. In the Pie Shop Again
6. Nearly a Woman
7. The Coffee Cart
8. What the Fuck
9. Whambi Turns Up Everywhere
10. Nearly a Woman (At The Pig & Whistle)
- Guest Performers: Whambi, Mark Goodier, Greg Proops, Emma Kennedy
- Songs: "Business Time", "Nearly A Woman"

=== Episode 5 – Suzanne ===
1. Hello, I'm Rob Brydon
2. Creative Juices
3. Waterloo Bridge
4. What You're Into
5. I'm Not Crying
6. After the Gig
7. Disharmony
8. Sue Is Trying to Split the Band
9. The Band's Broken Up
10. The Humans Are Dead
- Guest Performers: Emma Kennedy
- Songs: "Robots" (aka "The Humans Are Dead"), "If You're Into It" (aka "What Your Into"), "I'm Not Cryin'"

=== Episode 6 – Neil Finn Saves The Day! ===
1. Hello, I'm Rob Brydon
2. All in the Toilet
3. A Bret-Shaped Hole
4. Jemaine's Going to Do It
5. The Royal Albert Hall
6. The Folk Parody Duo
7. Community Fete Board
8. Sticky Situation
9. Work Permit Violation
10. What of the Legacy
- Guest Performers: Justin Edwards, Jarred Christmas, Beth Chalmers, Jimmy Carr, Emma Kennedy
- Songs: "Think About It", "Boom", "Hiphopopotomus & Rhymenocerus", "Foux Du Fafa",
