= Mickey Petralia =

- Genres: Pop/Rock
- Occupation(s): Record producer, Engineer, Mixer
- Years active: 1994–present

Mickey Petralia is an American producer, engineer, and mixer. He has worked with Rage Against the Machine, Peaches, Beck, and Flight of the Conchords.

== Awards ==
In 2001, Petralia was nominated for the album of the year with his work on Midnite Vultures at the Grammy Awards. A few years later in 2008, Petralia won the Best Comedy Album at the Grammy Awards in collaboration with The Distant Future.

== Discography ==
- 2018 – The Deconstruction by Eels
- 2014 – Muppets Most Wanted: Original Soundtrack
- 2011 – The Muppets: Original Soundtrack
- 2009 – "The Last Day on Earth" – Kate Miller-Heidke
- 2009 – I Told You I Was Freaky – Flight of the Conchords
- 2008 – Curiouser – Kate Miller-Heidke
- 2007 – The Rise and Fall of Love and Hate – Oslo
- 2007 – The Distant Future – Flight of the Conchords
- 2006 – Impeach My Bush – Peaches
- 2006 – Be He Me – Annuals
- 2004 – Dangerous Dreams – Moving Units
- 2003 – "Dig It" D-Tent Boys Holes (film)
- 2003 – The New Folk Implosion – The Folk Implosion
- 2002 – Reanimation – Linkin Park
- 2002 – Light & Magic – Ladytron
- 2000 – "Testify" – Rage Against the Machine
- 1999 – Midnite Vultures – Beck
- 1999 – Freelance Bubblehead – 1000 Clowns
- 1999 – I Oughtta Give You a Shot in the Head for Making Me Live in This Dump – Shivaree
- 1999 – Electric Honey – Luscious Jackson
- 1998 – Electro-Shock Blues – Eels
- 1997 – ...The Dandy Warhols Come Down – The Dandy Warhols
- 1995 – Don Knotts Overdrive – Safety Dance featuring Earl Ph.Dog
