= Feel Inside (And Stuff Like That) =

2012 single by Flight of the Conchords

Single by Flight of the Conchords
- Released: 24 August 2012
- Genre: Pop; parody music
- Length: 3:57
- Label: Collusion
- Songwriters: Bret McKenzie; Jemaine Clement

Cure Kids charity singles chronology
"Pencils in the Wind" (2009)	"Feel Inside (And Stuff Like That)" (2012)	"Team Ball Player Thing" (2015)

"Feel Inside (And Stuff Like That)" is a 2012 charity single and comedy song by New Zealand comedy duo Flight of the Conchords. The Conchords are joined by a charity supergroup made up of New Zealand singers. Proceeds of the song benefited the New Zealand children's health research charity Cure Kids. The song debuted at number one on the New Zealand Top 40.

== Background ==
The project was created and produced by Brooke Howard-Smith and Jesse Griffin and was written by Jemaine Clement, Bret McKenzie, and American producers Printz Board and Sleep as part of TV3's charity special Red Nose Day: Comedy for Cure Kids. In writing the song, Clement and McKenzie interviewed a group of 5- and 6-year-old children from Clyde Quay School in Wellington and Grey Lynn School in Auckland, asking them about sick children and charity fundraising. The Conchords used the children's often nonsensical responses to build the lyrics of the song. As well as serving as a bona fide charity single, the song also parodies the charity supergroup songs of the 1980s, such as "Do They Know It's Christmas?".

== Featured singers ==
In order of appearance:

- Flight of the Conchords (Jemaine Clement and Bret McKenzie)
- Brooke Fraser
- Dave Dobbyn
- Savage
- Boh Runga
- Sam Scott and Luke Buda
- Ruby Frost
- Zowie
- Rikki Morris
- Nathan King
- Victoria Girling-Butcher
- Peter Urlich
- Elizabeth Marvelly
- Cherie Mathieson
- Massad
- Moana Maniapoto
- Young Sid, PNC, Tyree, Deach
- Kids of 88

== Charts ==
Chart performance for "Feel Inside (And Stuff Like That)"
Chart (2012)	Peak position
New Zealand (Recorded Music NZ)	1
