= The Distant Future =

The Distant Future [EP]

EP by Flight of the Conchords
- Released: August 7, 2007
- Recorded: 2007
- Genre: Comedy
- Length: 22:55
- Label: Sub Pop
- Producer: Flight of the Conchords, Mickey Petralia

Flight of the Conchords chronology
The BBC Radio Series: Flight of the Conchords (2006)	The Distant Future [EP] (2007)	Flight of the Conchords (2008)

Professional ratings
Review scores
Source	Rating
IGN	8/10 stars
Prefix Magazine	6.5/10 stars
AllMusic	3.5/5 stars
Robert Christgau	(choice cut)

The Distant Future is an EP by New Zealand folk-parody duo Flight of the Conchords, released on August 7, 2007. It was certified Gold in New Zealand on May 11, 2008, selling over 7,500 copies.

The album was produced by Mickey Petralia and recorded in LA and New York by Petralia and engineer Matt Shane. The live portions were taken from concerts at Comix Comedy Club in New York City.

The EP won Best Comedy Album at the 2008 Grammy Awards.

== Track listing ==
All tracks are written by Jemaine Clement and Bret McKenzie.

1. "Business Time" - 4:05
2. "If You're Into It" - 1:46
3. "Not Crying" - 3:24
4. "The Most Beautiful Girl (In the Room) (Live)" - 5:10
5. "Banter (Live)" - 3:33
6. "Robots (Live)" - 5:00
