= Flight of the Conchords =

New Zealand musical comedy duo

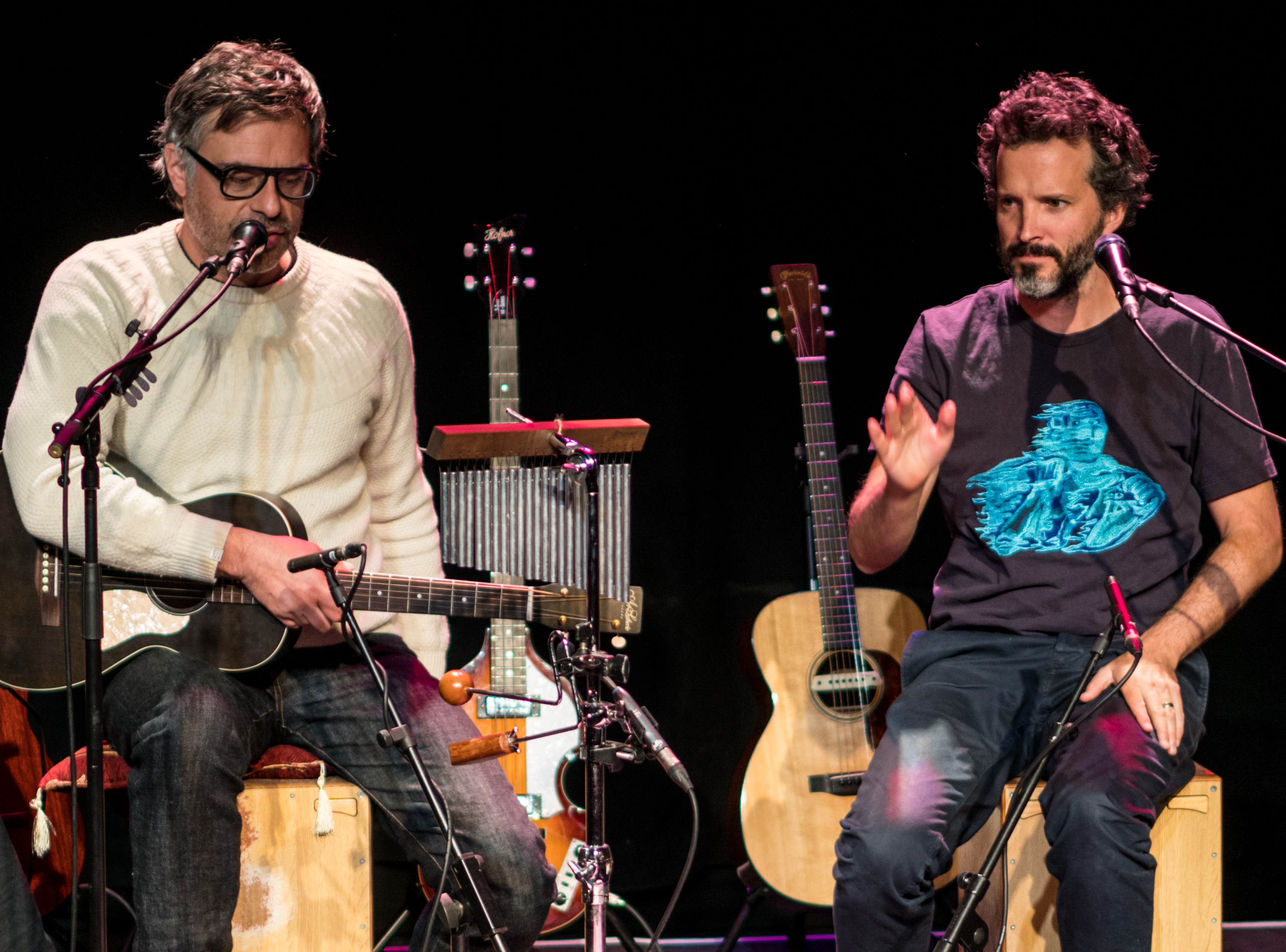
- Jemaine Clement (left) and Bret McKenzie (right) performing in London in 2018

Background information
- Origin: Wellington, New Zealand
- Genres: Comedy; alternative rock; acoustic; parody folk; hip hop
- Years active: 1998–present
- Labels: Sub Pop; Flight of the Conchords Music; BBC Audiobooks
- Members: Jemaine Clement; Bret McKenzie
- Website: flightoftheconchords.co.nz

Flight of the Conchords are a New Zealand musical comedy duo formed in Wellington in 1998. The band consists of multi-instrumentalists Bret McKenzie and Jemaine Clement. The duo began as a popular live comedy act in the early 2000s, and their blend of comedy and music subsequently became the basis of the self-titled BBC radio series (2005) and, later, the HBO series Flight of the Conchords (2007–2009). They released their first full-length comedy special, Live in London, in October 2018 on HBO, followed by a live album release through Sub Pop in March 2019.

The duo's live performances combine skits, audience interactions, and songs, and they continue to tour periodically. They received a nomination for the Perrier Comedy Award at the 2003 Edinburgh Festival Fringe, were named Best Newcomer at the 2003 Melbourne International Comedy Festival, and were named Best Alternative Comedy Act at the 2005 US Comedy Arts Festival. They have been nominated three times for a Grammy Award—winning Best Comedy Album in 2008—and have received eight Primetime Emmy Award nominations.

== Career history ==
=== 1998–2006: Early years ===
McKenzie and Clement were flatmates at Victoria University of Wellington, where they studied film and theatre before forming Flight of the Conchords in 1998. They first performed as part of a five-man group called So You're a Man, which included Taika Waititi and debuted at Wellington's BATS Theatre, garnering a small but loyal following in New Zealand and Australia.

The band first performed on television on Newtown Salad, a show on Wellington's short-lived local TV station Channel 7 (later renamed WTV). They played two songs on the premiere episode in 1999 and appeared over four nights from 3 to 6 May 2000; the songs, in order, were "Bowie", "Ladies of the World", "Petrov, Yelyena and Me", and "Hotties".

They performed at the Edinburgh Festival Fringe in 2002, 2003—when they were nominated for the Perrier Award—and 2004. They also performed at the Melbourne International Comedy Festival, where they won the Best Newcomer Award. They were later featured in a 2004 campaign for British mobile phone retailer Phones 4U and in the show Stand Up! on Australia's ABC TV.

In 2005, HBO gave the group a special on their Friday-night half-hour comedy series One Night Stand. They then headlined during the opening weekend of the Comix comedy club in New York City in September 2006.

During this period, they had television development deals in the United Kingdom, NBC in the United States, and TVNZ in New Zealand, but no shows were ultimately produced. In 2006, they performed at the South by Southwest Music Festival in Austin, Texas. While in Texas, they recorded a documentary titled Flight of the Conchords: A Texan Odyssey, which aired on New Zealand's TV3 in late 2006.

==== BBC radio series ====
In 2004, the band created a six-part radio series for BBC Radio 2. Largely improvised, the series was broadcast in September 2005 and based on the band's search for commercial success in London. It featured Rob Brydon as their narrator, Darby as their manager and Jimmy Carr as a devoted fan called Kipper. The radio series served as a direct progenitor of the television series: it shared a similar premise—the band arriving in a foreign country to make their fortune, Darby playing their manager and calling band meetings—and many of the songs were later used in the television series.

The BBC Radio 2 series won the duo the Bronze Sony Radio Academy Award for comedy.

=== 2007–2010: HBO television sitcom and further acclaim ===
==== TV sitcom ====
The duo starred in a television sitcom for HBO, titled Flight of the Conchords, which premiered in the United States in June 2007. The series simultaneously premiered in Canada on The Movie Network and Movie Central, and was also shown on The Comedy Network.

The series revolves around a fictional version of the pair as they achieve success as a band in New York City and develop an American fan base. The regular cast includes fellow comedians Rhys Darby as Murray, Arj Barker as Dave, and Kristen Schaal as their obsessed fan Mel. The program also features many other comedians in guest-starring roles. Their songs are woven into the plot of each episode. The show received a Primetime Emmy Award for Outstanding Comedy Series nomination. It was shot primarily in the Two Bridges neighbourhood of Manhattan.

The first season consisted of 12 episodes. The second season started on HBO on 18 January 2009 and consisted of 10 episodes. On 10 December 2009, the duo and co-creator and director James Bobin announced that the show would not return for a third season.

==== Albums ====
The band's first studio release was the 2007 EP The Distant Future, which included three studio recordings and three live tracks; on 10 February 2008, they were awarded the Grammy Award for Best Comedy Album for the record. Produced by Mickey Petralia and recorded in Los Angeles and New York by Petralia and engineer Matt Shane, it was released on 7 August 2007 on Sub Pop; the live portions were taken from their Comix comedy club performances. Following their signing with Sub Pop in 2007, they released their self-titled debut studio album, Flight of the Conchords, in 2008. Following the second season of the show in 2009, the band released their second album, I Told You I Was Freaky.

==== Appearances ====
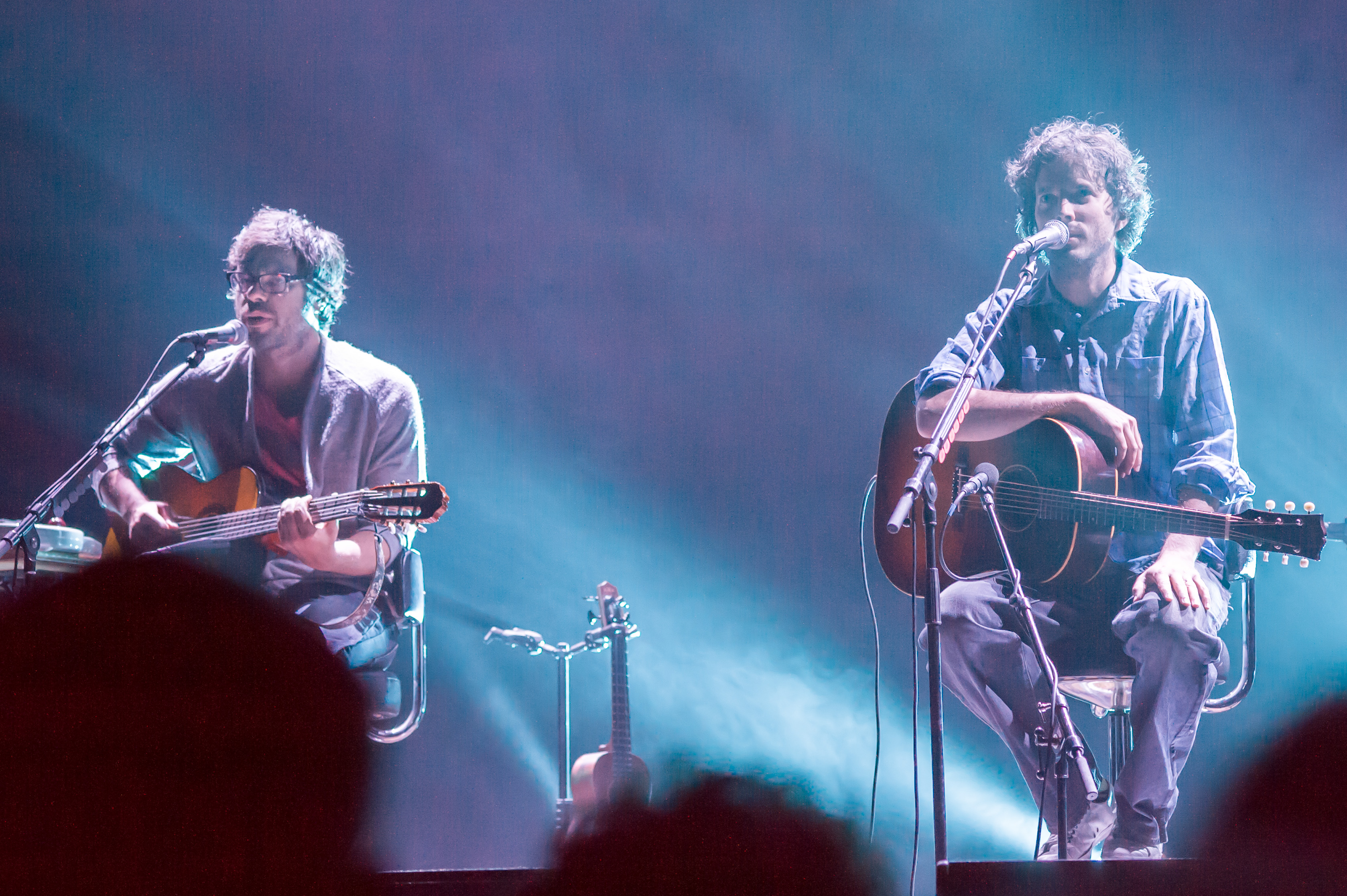
Flight of the Conchords performing at Cirkus in Stockholm, Sweden, in May 2010

In June 2007, the band performed on the Late Show with David Letterman and were interviewed by Terry Gross on the NPR radio show Fresh Air. They appeared at the 2007 Bonnaroo Music Festival in Manchester, Tennessee. On 19 June 2007, they appeared as the musical guests on Late Night with Conan O'Brien.

In January 2008, the band spoke and performed as part of Comcast's presentation at CES 2008. On 13 February 2008, Flight of the Conchords had their first post-Grammy concert, a free show, at a small video store called Aro Video. On 5 March 2008, they performed at a private show at The Depot in Salt Lake City, Utah, for the 2008 Omniture web analytics conference, and the following day at Cahn Auditorium at Northwestern University. On 24 April 2008, they gave a free show at Amoeba Music in Hollywood, California. They performed on the main stage of the Sasquatch! Music Festival on 26 May 2008 at The Gorge Amphitheatre in central Washington state. On 28 May 2008, they performed at the Google I/O conference in San Francisco. On 12 July 2008, they performed at Sub Pop's 20th Anniversary Music Festival.

The duo made a special guest appearance as the aliens in two episodes of The Drinky Crow Show on Cartoon Network's late-night television programming block Adult Swim. On 31 March 2009, the duo performed in Masterton, New Zealand, to 2,000 locals as a benefit for Clement's former secondary school, Makoura College, raising around NZ$80,000 prior to embarking on a 37-date North American tour. They also appeared on the season four finale of Tim and Eric Awesome Show, Great Job!, briefly replacing Tim and Eric during a high-stakes game of tennis. The duo guest-starred as a pair of camp counsellors in "Elementary School Musical", the season premiere of the 22nd season of The Simpsons, which aired 26 September 2010.

=== 2011–present: Reunion, tours, and film ===
In an interview with Vulture on 28 November 2011, McKenzie said that plans were in the works for a reunion tour in 2012 and that he and Clement were discussing a Flight of the Conchords movie, stating: "We're going to try and do a movie. We just need a story." However, HBO stated that it had no plans for such a film. In an interview published in IndieWire in August 2015, Clement said that a Flight of the Conchords movie was being written, although he indicated that it was still in the early phases.

It was confirmed in March 2012 that a full 10-show tour of larger New Zealand venues was in place for June 2012. Tickets went on sale on 23 March, with the premium seats at each venue available only in person at the box office, to prevent scalping. All original shows sold out within 10 minutes once they were released on general sale.

For Red Nose Day 2012, the duo recorded a charity single composed of lyrics volunteered by Auckland and Wellington schoolchildren, titled "Feel Inside (And Stuff Like That)". The song features performances from other New Zealand celebrities, including Dave Dobbyn, Brooke Fraser, Boh Runga, Samuel Flynn Scott, Luke Buda, Savage, Young Sid, Tyree, Deach, PNC, Zowie, Ruby Frost, Kids of 88, Rikki Morris, Moana Maniapoto, Nathan King, Maitereya, Victoria Girling-Butcher, Elizabeth Marvelly, Peter Urlich and Cherie Mathieson. The song entered at number one on the New Zealand Singles Chart, becoming their first number-one single, and was certified Platinum, selling over 15,000 copies in its first week.

On 23 August 2013, Flight of the Conchords co-headlined the Oddball & Curiosity Festival with Dave Chappelle, kicking off the tour in Austin, Texas. In 2016, the duo performed new songs alongside old favourites on a North American tour; they also appeared at the 2016 Newport Folk Festival in Newport, Rhode Island.

In 2018, Flight of the Conchords reunited for Flight of the Conchords: Live in London, a one-hour TV special on HBO. The special was preceded by a tour in the United Kingdom and Ireland that year.

After an eight-year hiatus from live performances, the duo reunited in 2026 for four sold-out warm-up shows at Meow Nui in Wellington before headlining two nights at the Greek Theatre in Los Angeles as part of the Netflix Is a Joke Festival, their first Los Angeles appearance since 2016.

== Related projects ==
Clement and Darby appeared in the horror comedy Diagnosis: Death, though not as Flight of the Conchords. The film was released on 2 November 2009. The song "I'm Not Crying" appears in the film The Pirates! In an Adventure with Scientists!

In 2014, Clement and Darby starred in the horror comedy mockumentary What We Do in the Shadows, directed by Clement and Waititi.

== Style and instrumentation ==
Traditionally, the duo both play acoustic guitar in live performances, with McKenzie almost always playing a standard grand concert-style acoustic guitar and Clement playing a parlour guitar and occasionally a classical or acoustic bass guitar.

They commonly employ 1980s-era novelty instruments like the Casio DG-20 guitar synthesizer and Omnichord, in addition to glockenspiel, bongos, and autoharp, among others. In the 2010s, they expanded their instrumentation; performances during their 2018 tour of the United Kingdom and Ireland saw both playing electric bass guitar (with Clement playing a Höfner 500/1) and using effect pedals. Since 2008, they have collaborated with musician Nigel Collins, who plays cello, keyboards, and percussion, for both studio and live performances.

== Discography ==
=== Albums ===
- The Distant Future (EP, 2007)
- Flight of the Conchords (2008)
- I Told You I Was Freaky (2009)
- Live in London (live album, 2019)

=== Radio ===
- The BBC Radio Series: Flight of the Conchords (2006); broadcast 2005, 6 episodes

== Filmography ==
- One Night Stand: Flight of the Conchords (2005); HBO half-hour comedy special
- Flight of the Conchords: A Texan Odyssey (2006); TV3 documentary
- Flight of the Conchords (2007–2009); HBO TV series, 22 episodes
- The Drinky Crow Show (2008); 2 episodes
- Flight of the Conchords: On Air (2009); NZ On Air documentary
- Tim and Eric Awesome Show, Great Job! (2009); 1 episode
- The Simpsons (2010); 1 episode
- Flight of the Conchords: Live in London (2018); HBO comedy special

== Tours ==
Tours, excluding one-off performances and mini tours, from 2008 on:

- North America (March–July 2008)
- North America (March–May 2009)
- Europe (March–May 2010)
- New Zealand & Australia (June–July 2012)
- United States (August–September 2013)
- North America (June–July 2016)
- United Kingdom & Ireland (March, June–July 2018)

== Awards ==
Selected accolades
| Year | Ceremony | Award | Work | Result |
|---|---|---|---|---|
| 2003 | Edinburgh Festival Fringe | Perrier Comedy Award | Folk the World | Nominated |
| 2003 | Melbourne International Comedy Festival | Best Newcomer | Flight of the Conchords | Won |
| 2005 | US Comedy Arts Festival | Best Alternative Act | Flight of the Conchords | Won |
| 2006 | Sony Radio Academy Awards | Comedy Award | Flight of the Conchords (radio) | Bronze |
| 2007 | Welly Awards | Arts | Jemaine Clement & Bret McKenzie | Won |
| 2007 | Welly Awards | Wellingtonian of the Year | Jemaine Clement & Bret McKenzie | Won |
| 2007 | 12th Satellite Awards | Best Television Series, Comedy or Musical | Flight of the Conchords (TV) | Nominated |
| 2008 | 50th Annual Grammy Awards | Best Comedy Album | The Distant Future | Won |
| 2008 | New Zealand Music Awards | Album of the Year | Flight of the Conchords (album) | Won |
| 2008 | New Zealand Music Awards | Best Group | Flight of the Conchords | Won |
| 2008 | New Zealand Music Awards | Breakthrough Artist of the Year | Flight of the Conchords | Won |
| 2008 | New Zealand Music Awards | International Achievement Award | Flight of the Conchords | Won |
| 2008 | 60th Primetime Emmy Awards | Outstanding Writing for a Comedy Series | James Bobin, Jemaine Clement & Bret McKenzie (Episode: "Yoko") | Nominated |
| 2008 | 60th Primetime Emmy Awards | Outstanding Original Music and Lyrics | "The Most Beautiful Girl (In the Room)" | Nominated |
| 2008 | 60th Primetime Emmy Awards | Outstanding Original Music and Lyrics | "Inner City Pressure" | Nominated |
| 2009 | 51st Grammy Awards | Best Comedy Album | Flight of the Conchords (album) | Nominated |
| 2009 | 61st Primetime Emmy Awards | Outstanding Comedy Series | Flight of the Conchords (TV) | Nominated |
| 2009 | 61st Primetime Emmy Awards | Outstanding Lead Actor in a Comedy Series | Jemaine Clement (Episode: "Unnatural Love") | Nominated |
| 2009 | 61st Primetime Emmy Awards | Outstanding Writing for a Comedy Series | James Bobin, Jemaine Clement & Bret McKenzie (Episode: "Prime Minister") | Nominated |
| 2009 | 61st Primetime Emmy Awards | Outstanding Original Music and Lyrics | "Carol Brown" | Nominated |
| 2009 | 14th Satellite Awards | Best Television Series, Comedy or Musical | Flight of the Conchords (TV) | Nominated |
| 2009 | 14th Satellite Awards | Best Actor in a Series, Comedy or Musical | Jemaine Clement | Nominated |
| 2011 | 53rd Grammy Awards | Best Comedy Album | I Told You I Was Freaky | Nominated |
| 2013 | New Zealand Music Awards | Highest Selling New Zealand Single | "Feel Inside (And Stuff Like That)" | Won |
| 2019 | 71st Primetime Emmy Awards | Outstanding Original Music and Lyrics | "Father & Son" (from Live in London) | Nominated |
