= Flight of the Conchords (album) =

Studio album by Flight of the Conchords
- Released: 21 April 2008
- Recorded: 2006/2007
- Genres: Comedy rock; anti-folk; alternative rock
- Length: 42:06
- Label: Sub Pop
- Producer: Mickey Petralia

Flight of the Conchords chronology
The Distant Future (2007)	Flight of the Conchords (2008)	I Told You I Was Freaky (2009)

Professional ratings
Aggregate scores
Source	Rating
Metacritic	79/100 link
Review scores
Source	Rating
AbsolutePunk	(83%) link
AllMusic	link
Robert Christgau	(2-star Honorable Mention)
NME	(8/10) link
Paste Magazine	link
Pitchfork	(7.2/10) link
Sputnikmusic	link

Flight of the Conchords is the debut full-length studio recorded album by New Zealand folk parody duo Flight of the Conchords, released 21 April 2008 by Sub Pop. Two songs, "Business Time" and "The Most Beautiful Girl (In the Room)", have been released as downloadable content for the video game Rock Band.

== Track listing ==
All tracks are written by Jemaine Clement and Bret McKenzie.

No.	Title	Length
1.	"Foux du Fafa"	2:47
2.	"Inner City Pressure"	3:27
3.	"Hiphopopotamus vs. Rhymenoceros"	2:09
4.	"Think About It"	3:15
5.	"Ladies of the World"	3:57
6.	"Mutha'uckas"	2:27
7.	"The Prince of Parties"	1:49
8.	"Leggy Blonde" (feat. Rhys Darby)	2:42
9.	"Robots"	3:43
10.	"Boom"	2:18
11.	"A Kiss Is Not a Contract"	1:55
12.	"The Most Beautiful Girl (In the Room)"	4:02
13.	"Business Time (from The Distant Future)"	4:05
14.	"Bowie"	3:16
15.	"Au Revoir"	0:22

iTunes bonus track
No.	Title	Length
16.	"Bret, You've Got It Going On" (pre-order only)	1:43

== Personnel ==
- All songs written and performed by Jemaine Clement and Bret McKenzie
- Sara Johnston - vocals on "Foux du Fafa"
- Robin Lynn - keys on "Foux du Fafa," "Think About It" and "The Most Beautiful Girl (In the Room)"
- Gus Seyffert - bass on "Think About It" and "Business Time"
- Danny Frankel - percussion on "Think About It," "The Prince of Parties" and "Business Time"
- Mickey Petralia - drums on "Ladies of the World" and "Leggy Blonde;" percussion on "The Prince of Parties" and "A Kiss is Not a Contract"
- Mark Lewis - drums on "Ladies of the World" and "The Most Beautiful Girl (In the Room)"
- Kyle O'Callaghan - co-writer and guitar on "The Most Beautiful Girl (In the Room)"
- Rhys Darby - vocals on "Leggy Blonde"
- Scott Seiver - drums on "Business Time" and "Bowie"
- David Ralicke - horns on "Bowie"

== Sales and chart performance ==
The album debuted at number three on the U.S. Billboard 200 chart, selling about 52,000 copies in its first week. In their home country of New Zealand, the album debuted at number two, beaten to the top spot by Shihad's Beautiful Machine. The following week it jumped to the number one spot. The album was certified 2× Platinum in New Zealand on 23 August 2009, shipping over 30,000 copies.

== Appearances on the TV show ==
All of the tracks on the album, with the exception of track 15, were featured in an episode of the TV series Flight of the Conchords.

- Tracks 9 and 12 were featured in the episode Sally.
- Tracks 2 and 10 were featured in the episode Bret Gives Up the Dream.
- Tracks 3 and 4 were featured in the episode Mugged.
- Track 13 was featured in the episode Sally Returns.
- Tracks 14 and 16 were featured in the episode Bowie.
- Tracks 6 and 8 were featured in the episode Drive By.
- Tracks 1 and 11 were featured in the episode Girlfriends.
- Tracks 5 and 7 were featured in the episode New Fans.

Many tracks are rerecorded or slightly remixed versions of those featured in the television program.

"Business Time" previously appeared on The Distant Future EP, along with live versions of "Robots" and "The Most Beautiful Girl (In the Room)".

== Music videos ==
A music video for the song "Ladies of the World" has been released by Sub Pop records. It is available on the Sub Pop YouTube channel.

In the video, Bret and Jemaine skate around a beach (mostly in slow motion) in a parody of "cheesy" 70's music videos. When they reach the hermaphrodite lyrics, the camera zooms in on a bulge in a woman's swimsuit. When the music fades back in at the end of the song, Bret and Jemaine "fly" into space; Bret flaps his arms and Jemaine uses his vest as wings.

== Awards ==
Award	Awarded at	Other Contenders in Category
Album of the Year	New Zealand Music Awards 08	Anika Moa, Liam Finn, Scribe, Tiki Taane
Best Group	New Zealand Music Awards 08	Shihad, The Phoenix Foundation
Breakthrough Artist of the Year	New Zealand Music Awards 08	Cut Off Your Hands, Tiki Taane
International Achievement	New Zealand Music Awards 08	Savage

== Charts ==
=== Weekly charts ===
Chart (2008)	Peak position
Australian Albums (ARIA)	37
New Zealand Albums (RMNZ)	1
US Billboard 200	3
US Soundtrack Albums (Billboard)	1

=== Year-end charts ===
Chart (2008)	Position
US Soundtrack Albums (Billboard)	21

== Certifications ==
Region	Certification	Certified units/sales
New Zealand (RMNZ)	2× Platinum	30,000^{^}
United States (RIAA)	Gold	500,000^{‡}
^{^} Shipments figures based on certification alone.^{‡} Sales+streaming figures based on certification alone.
