= The New Cup =

- Flight of the Conchords episode
- Bret raps about his "Sugalumps." The song and video received praise from critics.
- Episode no.: Season 2 Episode 2
- Directed by: James Bobin
- Written by: Duncan Sarkies
- Production code: 202
- Original air date: January 25, 2009
- Running time: 30 minutes

Guest appearances
- David Costabile as Doug; Eugene Mirman as Eugene; Frank Wood as Greg; Michael Potts as Nigel Saladu; Mary Catherine Garrison as Jemaine's client; Karen Gerstman as Potential client one; Anjali Bhimani as Potential client two; Antonio Suarez as Policeman; Nancy Ticotin as Policewoman; Kelly Taffe as Policewoman

Episode chronology
| ← Previous "A Good Opportunity" | Next → "The Tough Brets" |

"The New Cup" is the second episode of the second season of the HBO comedy series Flight of the Conchords, and the series' fourteenth episode overall. This episode first aired in the United States on January 25, 2009. The episode was directed by James Bobin and written by Duncan Sarkies. In this episode, Bret and Jemaine's fortunes unravel after Bret buys a new teacup. With emergency band funds unavailable, Jemaine takes desperate measures in hopes of supplementing their income.

"The New Cup" received largely positive reviews from critics, with many noting that both the episode's plot and songs were particularly strong. According to Nielsen Media Research, on its initial broadcast, "The New Cup" was watched by over 500,000 people. Two songs from the episode, "Sugalumps" and "You Don't Have to be a Prostitute", received positive critical acclaim and were later included on the band's second album I Told You I Was Freaky.

== Plot ==
Bret buys a new cup for $2.79 so that he and Jemaine no longer have to share one cup. A month later, they find out that their check for the phone bill bounced because their account was short $2.79. The phone company charges them a $30 overdraft fee, causing the cheque for their gas bill to bounce, and both services are scheduled to be cut off. Immediately after finding this out, their power goes off. Bret ends up selling his guitar to pay the bills, and he performs on stage with Jemaine while playing air guitar and making guitar sounds. Murray writes up his negative opinion of the show in the New Zealand consulate newsletter, giving them "two stars out of 100". When Bret asks Murray for some of the emergency band fund, Murray tells him that he invested the money with a Nigerian man named Nigel Seladu who contacted him over the internet. Nigel promised Murray his money back with "a thousand percent interest" and "a share of his family fortunes". Jemaine and Bret are certain that this is merely a scam.

Later on, Bret and Jemaine are confronted by Mel. When she learns they're having money troubles, she offers to pay them for a massage. Both Bret and Jemaine awkwardly try to give her a minimal contact massage while her husband, Doug, is nearby watching. Jemaine later suggests to Bret that they become male prostitutes, similar to the film Pretty Woman. They then launch into a parody of "My Humps" by The Black Eyed Peas called "Sugalumps". Trying their idea out, Jemaine approaches women on the street and asks them if they want to pay money to have sex with Bret, who is standing across the street. They then switch roles, but are unable to drum up any business. At night, their apartment is still without power and Jemaine ends up selling his bass guitar. This results in them playing a gig with both members on air guitar performing "Robots".

Jemaine, meanwhile, calls up an old girlfriend and leaves a message on her answering machine asking her if she wants to pay him for the sex they previously had during their relationship. He later ends up meeting his landlord, Eugene, who found his posting for a male prostitute service on the apartment's bulletin board. Eugene advises him to go to a fancy hotel and try his luck. At a band meeting, Murray introduces Nigel Seladu, whose investment offer has turned out to be legitimate and not a scam, and results in Murray earning more than enough money for the Conchords to pay their bills and buy back their guitars. Jemaine is noticeably absent and Bret tells Murray that he is out trying to prostitute himself. Both Murray and Nigel tell Bret to go and stop him. On his way, Bret sings a song called "You Don't Have to be A Prostitute", similar to The Police's "Roxanne".

He finds Jemaine in a hotel room about to have sex with a "pretty woman". He starts telling Jemaine that he doesn't need to do this any more but is interrupted by a knock on the door. Bret explains that he called the police to come and save Jemaine. When they enter, they ask Jemaine and Bret if they are prostitutes, to which Jemaine replies "Yes" and Bret replies "No, no. I'm just the guy that wears the big condom". They are both put in jail. Murray comes to bail them out, telling them that he had to spend all of their newly acquired investment return on bail. In the closing scene, a desk-fan knocks over the new cup, causing it to smash on the floor.

== Production ==
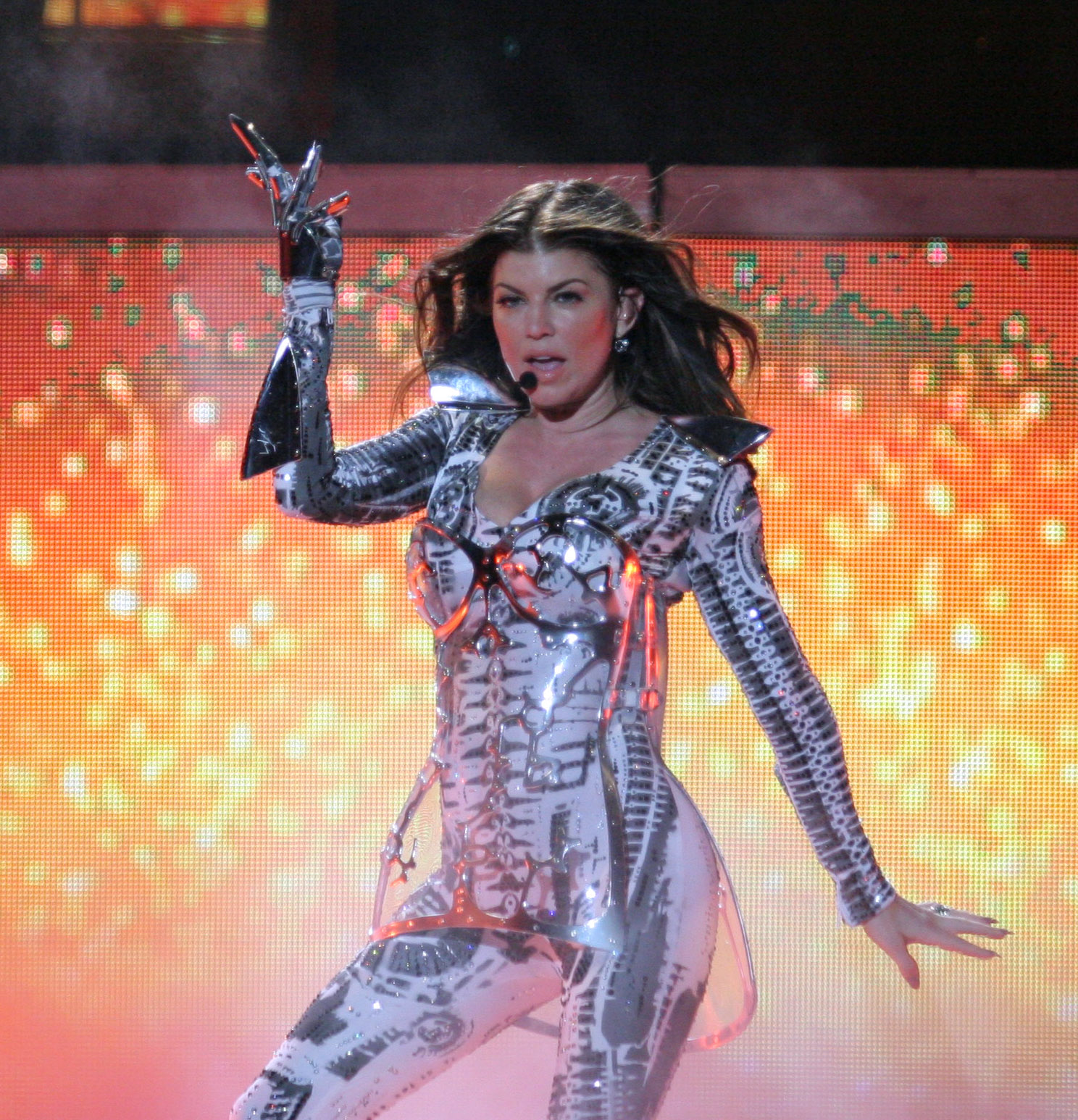
The episode features the song "Sugalumps," which stylistically lampoons The Black Eyed Peas hit single "My Humps" (Fergie shown)

"The New Cup" was written by writer Duncan Sarkies, his second writing credit for the series after season one's "New Fans." The episode was directed by series co-creator James Bobin. The episode makes several noticeable references to the film Midnight Cowboy. In the scene wherein Jemaine and Bret ask women if they want to pay money to have sex with them, Bret quotes Enrico "Ratso" Rizzo's (Dustin Hoffman) line "I'm walking here, I'm walking." Earlier in the episode, Jemaine suggested that Bret should wear a cowboy hat to be more attractive to women. In the video for "You Don't Have to be A Prostitute", Jemaine wears a leather cowboy waistcoat and cowboy shoes, and wears a cowboy hat during the credits.

Further cultural references are made throughout the episode. During the band meeting scene, Murray asks the duo if they can think of "any successful musicians with no instruments?" Jemaine names off The Mormon Tabernacle Choir, Boyz II Men, Bobby McFerrin and Luciano Pavarotti before Murray tells them that "there are none." While deliberating whether to become prostitutes, Bret and Jemaine reference Pretty Woman, erroneously believing Richard Gere portrayed a male prostitute in the film. Near the end of the episode, Murray tells Bret and Jemaine about a Nigerian man who is seeking money via email. This is a play on the actual Advance-fee fraud that swept the internet in the latter part of the 20th century.

=== Songs ===
The first song featured in the episode is "Sugalumps". This song is a stylistic parody of The Black Eyed Peas' hit "My Humps" which The Yale Herald wrote was based around the premise that "balls are significantly more hilarious than boobs". In addition, the song was later described as a "New Zealanders version of" Kelis's "Milkshake." Bret briefly appears as The Prince of Parties, a reference to a song from the season one episode "New Fans." Dave sings his portion of the rap in a style very similar to the opening theme of the TV series The Fresh Prince of Bel-Air. The second song featured in the episode is "You Don't Have to Be a Prostitute." In an interview with The A.V. Club, Jemaine explained that the song was inspired by The Police's hit single "Roxanne". However, the duo wished to make a "judgmental" version that "makes a lot of assumptions about the profession. Singing a song about prostitution, like 'I'll stop you from being a prostitute with this song'".

== Broadcast and reception ==
"The New Cup" debuted on HBO on January 25, 2009. The episode received over 500,000 viewers. This made the episode the third highest rated premium cable episode on Sunday, coming in after an episode of United States of Tara and ranking before an episode of The L Word.

Critical reception to the episode was largely positive. The A.V. Club reviewer Genevieve Koski awarded the episode an A− rating and, while noting that the episode was a "rehash" of the season one episode "Bret Gives Up the Dream, wrote, "after getting off to a somewhat shaky start with last week’s season premiere, Flight Of The Conchords seems to be settling back into its groove this week, with a couple of memorable songs to match a memorable plot." IGN reviewer Matt Fowler gave it an 8.4 out of 10 rating and noted that Flight of the Conchords is at its best when "the antics remain tightly between [Bret and Jemaine], and this episode sticks with that," noting that the episode "winds up being rather great." Noted television critic Alan Sepinwall wrote, "Taken on its own, though, this [episode] was perfection, as both comedy and as musical." Furthermore, he called the episode "magnificently constructed".

Many reviews complimented the episode's songs. Huffington Post reviewer Mike Moody noted that both the dry humor in the episode and its songs were humorous, writing, "I usually find myself heading to the kitchen when the songs come on -- but I usually glance back at the TV to see if Jemaine is making a funny face – and I rush back to the couch once the last note drops. But I can't wait to download tonight's Police-inspired ['You Don't Have to be a Prostitute'] jam." The Guardian named "Sugalumps" one of the top five best season two Flight of the Conchords songs.
