= Sally (Flight of the Conchords) =

- Flight of the Conchords episode
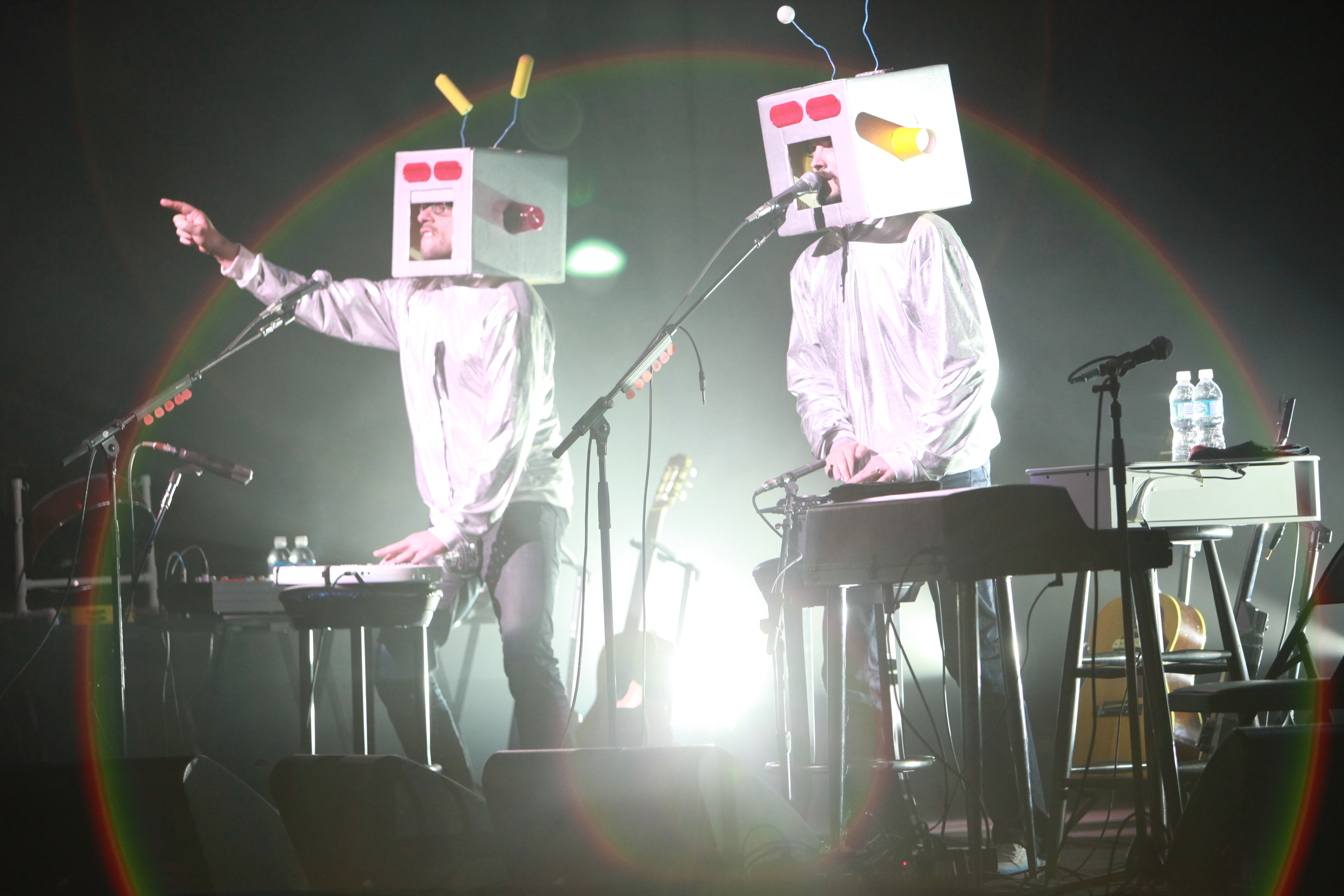
- The episode marked the television debut of the Flight of the Conchords song and single "Robots."
- Episode no.: Season 1 Episode 1
- Directed by: James Bobin
- Written by: James Bobin; Jemaine Clement; Bret McKenzie
- Production code: 101
- Original air date: June 17, 2007

Guest appearances
- Rachel Blanchard as Sally; Eugene Mirman as Eugene; David Costabile as Doug; Judah Friedlander as Man with cake; Frank Wood as Greg

Episode chronology
← Previous —	Next → "Bret Gives Up the Dream"

"Sally" is the pilot episode of the American television sitcom Flight of the Conchords. It first aired on HBO on June 17, 2007. In this episode, New Zealanders Jemaine Clement and Bret McKenzie of the band Flight of the Conchords have moved to New York City to try to make it in the United States. At a party, Jemaine falls for, and subsequently begins dating, Sally—Bret's former girlfriend. As Jemaine's attentions focus on Sally, a lonely Bret is forced to deal with the advances of Mel (Kristen Schaal), the band's obsessed—and only—fan. Meanwhile, Murray (Rhys Darby), the band's manager, helps the band film their first music video, although they cannot afford decent costumes or proper video equipment.

"Sally" received largely positive reviews from critics. According to Nielsen Media Research, "Sally" drew over 1.2 million viewers. Several of the songs from the episode, most notably "Robots", "Not Crying", and "Most Beautiful Girl (In the Room)" received critical acclaim. All three songs were released on the band's EP The Distant Future, although "Robots" appeared in a live form. "Robots" later was re-recorded and released on the band's debut album Flight of the Conchords, along with "Most Beautiful Girl (In the Room)." The latter was later nominated for an Emmy Award for Outstanding Original Music And Lyrics.

== Plot ==
Jemaine (Jemaine Clement) and Bret (Bret McKenzie) attend a party thrown by their friend Dave (Arj Barker). In the crowd Jemaine spots a beautiful woman, Sally (Rachel Blanchard), inspiring him to sing "Most Beautiful Girl (In the Room)". Jemaine and Sally leave the party and eventually go back to the band's apartment, but just as they begin kissing, Bret disturbs them by turning on the light, and an embarrassed Sally leaves. The next morning, Jemaine blames her departure on "the whole situation with the light". However, Bret suggests it was because he used to date her himself.

Bret and Jemaine go to a band meeting with their manager Murray (Rhys Darby) in his office in the New Zealand Consulate. Murray criticizes Jemaine for dating his bandmate's ex, and discusses the need to increase the group's fan base, which currently consists of only one person: the obsessive Mel (Kristen Schaal). Bret suggests they film a music video. However, unable to afford real video equipment and robot costumes like Daft Punk, they are forced to rely on a camera phone and disappointing cardboard costumes made by Murray. Regardless, they manage to film a video for "Robots".

Over the following week, Jemaine spends more time with Sally, leaving Bret feeling lonely and neglected. When Bret suggests hanging out sometime, Jemaine invites him along on a dinner date with Sally, but they all feel a "bit weird" and Bret leaves early. On the way home, Mel tries to cheer him up but fails miserably. Immediately after dinner, Sally breaks up with Jemaine, leading him to sing "Not Crying" with Bret.

== Production ==
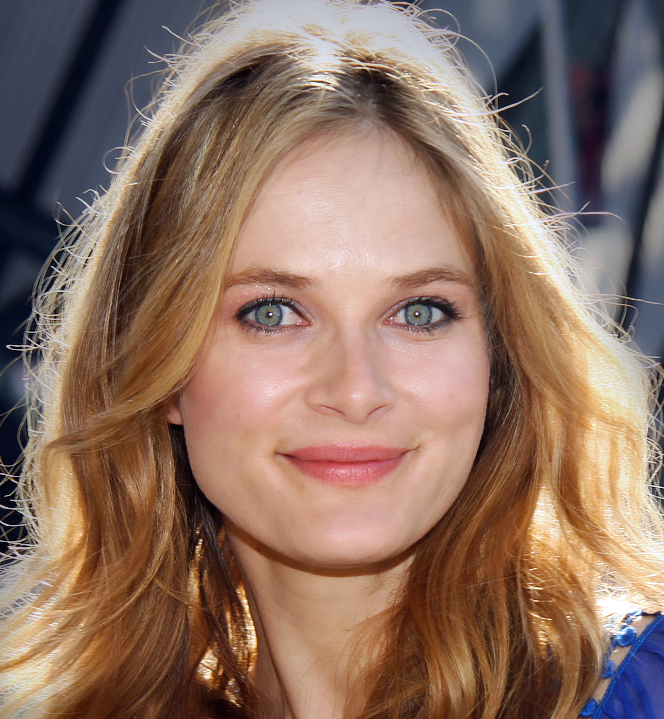
Rachel Blanchard guest starred as the titular Sally

"Sally" was written by series co-creators James Bobin, Jemaine Clement, and Bret McKenzie, the latter two starring as the titular Flight of the Conchords. Bobin directed the episode. The episode is the first of the series to feature Rachel Blanchard as Sally. The character returns to disrupt Bret and Jemaine's lives in the fifth episode, "Sally Returns". In "Sally", the character Mel shows Bret that she carries around a picture of Jemaine's lips in her wallet. This was inspired by an incident that happened to the band during the filming of their documentary A Texan Odyssey which covered their trip to the 2006 South by Southwest (SXSW) festival in Austin, Texas. The incident was caught on camera and is included in the documentary. Judah Friedlander has a cameo appearance in this episode, playing the role of the man who tries to sell Dave a cake.

=== Songs ===
The episode features three songs: "The Most Beautiful Girl (In the Room)", "Robots", and "Not Crying". The first (also known as "Part-Time Model") was based on the conceit of a man "who's not very good at compliments." This song was voted number 60 in the 2008 Triple J Hottest 100. Later, the song was nominated for an Emmy award for Outstanding Original Music And Lyrics. The second song, "Robots" (also known as "Humans Are Dead"), is sung by both Bret and Jemaine. It is set in a post-apocalyptic "distant future" (anachronistically stated to be the year 2000), in which all humans are dead and robots have taken over the world. Within the context of the show, it is the band's first music video; since the band has very limited funds, Murray constructs the robot costumes himself and films the video using a cell phone. The episode's final song is "Not Crying", which Jemaine sings in response to Sally breaking up with him. In the song's lyrics, Jemaine denies that he is crying by claiming that "it's just been raining on my face". All three of the songs were released on The Distant Future EP in 2007, however, "The Most Beautiful Girl (In the Room)" and "Robots" appeared in live form. The two were subsequently re-recorded in studio form for the band's debut album, Flight of the Conchords in 2008.

== Cultural references ==
Murray is wearing a New Zealand All Blacks rugby shirt when the band is in Dave's pawn shop obtaining a camera. In the same scene, Murray and Bret have a conversation about the band Fleetwood Mac, which culminates in a joke about their album "Rumours" and the widely-discussed relationship troubles that inspired the album. Rhys Darby, who played Murray, later asked Mick Fleetwood (the drummer for Fleetwood Mac), if he had heard the joke and whether he enjoyed it. Fleetwood responded that he appreciated it, adding: "We have a humour about the fact that our lives were incredibly public", he noted during the interview. "Really we were stupid enough to do interviews like this and talk openly about who we are and what we are." During the filming of the video for "Robots", Jemaine tells Murray that he wanted robot costumes "like Daft Punk" rather than the amateur versions hand-crafted by Murray. Murray replies with a characteristic lack of musical knowledge: "I don't know who he [i.e., Daft Punk] is."

== Broadcast and reception ==
"Sally" debuted on the internet, a month before the show premiered on HBO. The network, in conjunction with MySpace, iTunes, Yahoo! TV, Movielink, Comcast.net and Roadrunner.com, allowed a promotional version of the episode to be streamed as part of an online marketing campaign to build up word-of-mouth for the series. On television, "Sally" debuted on the HBO in the United States at 10:30 PM on Sunday, June 17, 2007, in the time slot preceded by Entourage, and vacated by the last episode of the final season of The Sopranos. The episode received over 1.2 million viewers.

The episode received largely positive reviews from critics. IGN, in an advanced review of the episode, awarded "Sally" an "amazing" 9.2 out of 10 rating and called the series "The funniest show you haven't seen yet." The review noted that, "Flight of the Conchords deserves the buzz it is slowly building. This is a very funny show." Blogcritics reviewer Daniel J. Stasiewski noted that the series was different for HBO, writing, "Flight of the Conchords isn’t Entourage or Sex in the City or even Extras. It’s different. And sometimes different is just good." Stasiewski, however, did note that the availability of the band's music on video sites like YouTube meant that watching the series was not worth the cost of a cable subscription. Further more, Stasiweski noted that while "the fun, quirky music videos that pop-up can make this long half-hour worth watching [...] the 10 or so minutes in between numbers aren’t groundbreaking comedy." Chris Schonberger from Entertainment Weekly gave the episode a largely positive review. He called the new series "the funniest hour of comedy on television" and noted that the performance of Rhys Darby as Murray Hewitt was excellent, calling his character "scene-stealing". Finally, Schonberger positively compared the episode to the 2004 comedy film Napoleon Dynamite, writing, "Indeed, the whole pilot vaguely reminded me of Napoleon in the way that the characters just sort of lurk around and pour their limited energy into absurd activities".
