= Bowie (Flight of the Conchords) =

- Flight of the Conchords episode
- David Bowie (in the form of Jemaine) appears in Bret's dream
- Episode no.: Season 1 Episode 6
- Directed by: Troy Miller
- Written by: James Bobin; Jemaine Clement; Bret McKenzie
- Production code: 106
- Original air date: 22 July 2007

Guest appearances
- Frank Wood (Greg); David Costabile (Doug); John Hodgman (David Armstrong)

Episode chronology
← Previous "Sally Returns"	Next → "Drive By"

"Bowie" is the sixth episode of the HBO comedy series Flight of the Conchords. The episode first aired in the United States on Sunday, 22 July 2007.

After a photo session, Bret develops body image issues and gets some dream advice from his idol, David Bowie. Jemaine plots to cheer him up and Murray tries to get one of the band's tunes used for a musical greeting card.

== Plot ==
Bret starts suffering body image issues after Murray accuses him of being small during a photo session. He then gets visited in a dream by a Ziggy Stardust-era David Bowie (performed by Jemaine, whose resemblance is acknowledged by Bret) telling him not to worry about his body image and advising him to get an eyepatch.

Murray announces that he has arranged a meeting with a company who are interested in using one of the band's songs in a musical greeting card. Jemaine visits Mel and asks her to cheer Bret up complimenting him next time she sees him. Later Jemaine tries to cheer Bret up himself by singing him a song he has written, "Bret, You've Got It Going On".

After Bowie's eyepatch suggestion causes accidents, Bret is visited again in a dream, this time by Bowie dressed as he appears in the "Ashes to Ashes" music video. Bowie advises him to do something "absolutely outrageous" when the "time is right". The next day they see Mel on the street who compliments Bret profusely at the expense of Jemaine who now starts to doubt his own body image.

At the greeting card meeting the owner, David Armstrong (played by John Hodgman), tries to explain the workings of the audio card to technically challenged Murray, Jemaine and Bret. When Armstrong says that he feels that the band are not really interested in the opportunity, Bret sees it as the cue to do something outrageous. He leaps onto the manager's desk and exposes himself, featuring "lightning bolts down his wanger." On the bus ride home, Murray and Jemaine express their disappointment with Bret for ruining the business opportunity and Murray becomes depressed that his management skills were not good enough to prevent the incident or spin it well.

That night Bret gets visited again. This time it is Bowie as Jareth the Goblin King from the movie Labyrinth. A disappointed Bowie tells Bret that he is out of advice and has lost confidence in his ability to help people. The scene ends with a song and music video, "Bowie", that mimics various performance styles and roles from David Bowie's career.

Later, Bret drinks a cup of coffee with Jemaine and Dave (Arj Barker) outside of Dave's pawn shop, where he concludes that if even David Bowie sometimes loses self-confidence, then he should not have to be so insecure about his body image. Murray arrives and tells them that despite the disastrous meeting, the greeting card company decided to produce the card anyway, but because the chosen design is "Happy 80th Birthday, Son" very few cards are made and the band ends up earning only 50¢.

== Songs ==
This episode features the following songs, both adapted from previous material by the duo:

=== "Bret, You've Got It Going On" ===
Jemaine sings "Bret, You've Got It Going On" to Bret as a way to cheer him up after he starts to feel insecure about his body. The song is meant as a tribute to Bret, although Jemaine insecurely asserts throughout the song that he is not gay and has no physical attraction to Bret, and concludes with Jemaine revealing that he once put a wig on Bret while he was sleeping in the same bed with him and pretended Bret was a woman.

The song is one of the few in the television series to have no accompanying montage or fantasy sequence and is performed primarily by Jemaine on guitar and vocals. It had previously been used in the second episode of the Flight of the Conchords radio series and was later released as an iTunes-only bonus track for pre-orders of their soundtrack album.

=== "Bowie" ===
"Bowie" (a.k.a. "Bowie's in Space") begins after Bret's last dream encounter with David Bowie. It is a parody of the many musical styles and visual aesthetics that Bowie has used in his career and features a long fantasy sequence that takes place in outer space.

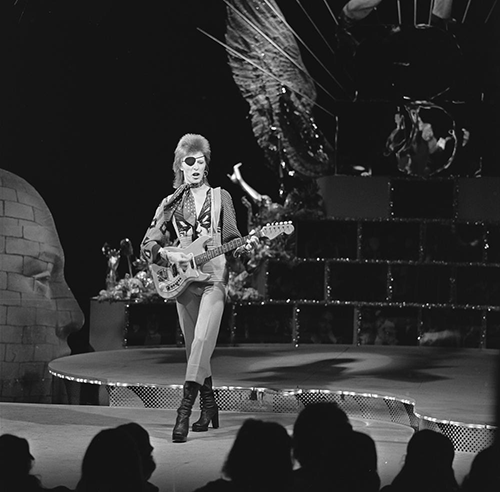
Bowie performing "Rebel Rebel" on AVRO's TopPop.

The song mimics the style of "Space Oddity", "John, I'm Only Dancing", "Let's Dance" and "Sound and Vision" and also briefly references "Changes" and "Life on Mars?" in the lyrics.

The accompanying music video includes imagery from many aspects of David Bowie's career, including elements of the original video for "Space Oddity" from his 1969 promotional film Love You till Tuesday and Bowie's costume from his 1974 appearance on AVRO's TopPop performing "Rebel Rebel", as well as references to his interests in mime and sci-fi imagery. The extreme close-ups and profile images of Bret and Jemaine's faces against black backgrounds are similar to those of David Bowie and Candy Clark in The Man Who Fell to Earth.

During the credits, a reprise of the song plays featuring a short clip mimicking the music video to "Let's Dance".

== Cultural references ==
Bret is reading a magazine called "Novelty Music Scene", early in the episode. On the cover is "Weird Al" Yankovic. When Murray shows the duo their photo that was featured in the magazine, the caption reads "New Zealand Novelty Duo: Tenacious Dundee?". This is a reference to another famous comedy musical pairing Tenacious D, and also to Crocodile Dundee, a fictional character created by Australian filmmaker Paul Hogan.

When David Bowie visits Bret for a second time, Bret tells him that his previous suggestion of wearing an eyepatch caused him to lose his depth perception. David Bowie had limited depth perception due to an eye injury that caused his left pupil to remain permanently and visibly dilated. David Bowie had worn an eyepatch in accompanying promotional videos for his songs "Rebel Rebel" and "Little Wonder". Also, this could be a reference to one of Bowie's stage personas Halloween Jack, who wore an eye patch, from the album Diamond Dogs. Bret also later dresses like Halloween Jack in the video for Bowie's In Space. The robot on the birthday card is a robot from the Doctor Who serial Robot.

The space-helmet-wearing band that appears during the bridge of "Bowie" is a reference to the 1977 video for "Magic Fly" by the French electronic music band Space.

There is a Sub Pop sticker on Bret's guitar case.
