= I Told You I Was Freaky =

Studio album by Flight of the Conchords
- Released: October 20, 2009
- Recorded: 2008/09
- Length: 33:44
- Label: Sub Pop
- Producer: Mickey Petralia

Flight of the Conchords chronology
Flight of the Conchords (2008)	I Told You I Was Freaky (2009)	Live in London (2019)

Singles from I Told You I Was Freaky
- 1. "Hurt Feelings" Released: September 2009

Professional ratings
Aggregate scores
Source	Rating
Metacritic	66/100
Review scores
Source	Rating
Allmusic	3.5/5 stars
BBC	(favourable)
CHARTattack	3.5/5 stars
NME	(8/10)
Paste	(41%)
Pitchfork Media	(6.7/10)
Rolling Stone	3/5 stars
Slant Magazine	2.5/5 stars
Spin	2.5/5 stars
Toro	3.0/5 stars

I Told You I Was Freaky is the second studio album by New Zealand folk parody duo Flight of the Conchords. It features 13 songs. Out of those 13, ten were released as singles on the American iTunes Store following their television debut. It was released on 20 October 2009 in the US and 2 November in the UK. One of the songs, "Demon Woman", was released as part of a downloadable track pack for the video game Rock Band.

== Track listing ==
All tracks are written by Jemaine Clement and Bret McKenzie, except "Carol Brown", written by James Bobin, Jemaine Clement and Bret McKenzie.

No.	Title	Length
1.	"Hurt Feelings"	2:38
2.	"Sugalumps"	2:11
3.	"We're Both in Love with a Sexy Lady"	2:49
4.	"I Told You I Was Freaky"	3:14
5.	"Demon Woman"	1:59
6.	"Rambling Through the Avenues of Time"	2:43
7.	"Fashion Is Danger"	2:20
8.	"Petrov, Yelyena, and Me"	2:28
9.	"Too Many Dicks (On the Dance Floor)"	2:28
10.	"You Don't Have to Be a Prostitute"	2:49
11.	"Friends"	2:03
12.	"Carol Brown"	3:26
13.	"Angels"	2:36

iTunes Bonus Track
No.	Title	Length
14.	"Pencils in the Wind"	3:05

== Personnel ==
Flight of the Conchords

- Bret McKenzie – lead vocals, guitars, keyboards, piano, Wurlitzer electric piano, drum programming
- Jemaine Clement – lead vocals, guitars, bass guitar

Other contributors

- Arj Barker – rapping on "Sugalumps" and "Too Many Dicks (On the Dance Floor)"
- Gus Seyffert – guitar on "We're Both in Love With a Sexy Lady"
- Josh Schwarz – guitar on "Demon Woman"
- David Ralicke – bass clarinet on "Rambling Through the Avenues of Time"
- Kristen Schaal and David Costabile – vocals on "Petrov, Yelyena, and Me"
- Shani Meivar – violin on "Petrov, Yelyena, and Me"
- Sam Scott – percussion on "Petrov, Yelyena, and Me"
- Mickey Petralia – drums on "You Don't Have to Be a Prostitute"
- Rhys Darby – vocals on "Friends"
- Jim Gaffigan – vocals on "Friends"
- Alison Sudol, Inara George, & Nadia Ackerman – backing vocals on "Carol Brown"
- Jo and Victoria Bobin – backing vocals on "Carol Brown" and "Angels"
- Jamie Sampson – backing vocals on "Angels"
- Sia Furler – backing vocals on "Carol Brown" and "You Don't Have to Be a Prostitute"

== Charts ==
Chart (2009)	Peak position
Australian Albums (ARIA Charts)	69
New Zealand Albums Chart	7
UK Albums Chart	47
US Billboard 200	19
