= The Tough Brets =

- Flight of the Conchords episode
- Jemaine expresses his "Hurt Feelings." The song received positive critical acclaim.
- Episode no.: Season 2 Episode 3
- Directed by: James Bobin
- Written by: James Bobin, Jemaine Clement, & Bret McKenzie
- Production code: 203
- Original air date: February 1, 2009

Guest appearances
- Seymour Cassel (Johnny Boy); Adam Garcia (Obnoxious Australian); Alan Dale (Australian Ambassador); David Costabile (Doug); Frank Wood (Greg); Feng Lui (Mr. Lee); Wai Ching Ho (Mrs. Lee); Jamie Jackson (Australian); Benjamin Howes (Australian); Gregory Ippolito (Tagger); Michael Chen (Tagger); Victor Williams (Policeman)

Episode chronology
| ← Previous "The New Cup" | Next → "Murray Takes It to the Next Level" |

"The Tough Brets" is the third episode of the second season of the HBO comedy series Flight of the Conchords, first broadcast in the United States on February 1, 2009.

== Plot ==
The Conchords are playing a gig at a local public library. During the performance Bret disses every rapper that comes to mind. At the band meeting the next day, Bret and Jemaine are criticized by Murray for making too much noise at the library, and for dissing the rappers. They proceed to launch into a rap about "Hurt Feelings". The meeting concludes with Murray warning the duo about the rappers hurting them back.

Dave tells Bret and Jemaine that American rappers hold grudges and seek retribution. This worries Bret so much that he begins to recruit a gang for protection. The members include "Johnny Boy" an elderly man with a history of gang involvement, Mr. and Mrs. Lee, two Asian Internet cafe owners who want retribution against vandals, and Dave (who claims to have been a Navy Seal).

Murray is harassed by several Australian men who work at the Australian consulate. Bret's gang has its first meeting. They figure out a timetable for guarding against any rapper attacks. Outside the apartment, Jemaine is accosted by Mel, who has painted a hideous portrait of him. Upon entering the apartment Jemaine is ambushed by the gang. Jemaine complains about this at the next band meeting, and Murray tries to persuade Bret to disband the gang. Bret refuses, but an argument is averted by the arrival of Greg, who informs Murray that they are invited to a function at the Australian consulate.

Mel finds her painting in the garbage. Jemaine claims that he had to throw it out because Bret was jealous. Mel promptly leaves to remedy this. Jemaine and Murray go to the function at the Australian consulate, which is much more posh than the New Zealand consulate. They are once again harassed by the Australians, who call Jemaine "Miss New Zealand". Even the ambassador joins in on the needling. The cast launches into another round of "Hurt Feelings".

Dave and Bret are keeping an eye out for ambushes by rappers. Murray, Greg, and Jemaine run into the Australians from the consulate. Bret is called on by the Lees to stop some kids from vandalizing their cafe. Both the gang and Murray launch into a West Side Story style dance off with their foes, complete with snapping. Bret ends up kicking one of the vandals, and Johnny takes him and Dave to hide at his old hideout. Upon discovering that it is no longer there, Johnny quits the gang.

That evening, Jemaine discovers that Mel has returned the painting, and now Bret is included. Jemaine tries to get rid of it, but Mel catches him and not wanting to offend, says that he is simply showing it to the neighborhood. Meanwhile, the police show up to question Bret about him kicking the boy. While Bret gets off with a warning, Dave falls off the windowsill while trying to escape. He winds up in the hospital, and quits the gang. Murray and Jemaine join, but after Jemaine and Bret quit, Murray is the only remaining member. The episode ends with Mel and Jemaine showing the horrendous painting around.

== Songs ==
The following songs are heard in this episode:

=== "Hurt Feelings" ===
A rap song in which Bret and Jemaine describe occasions on which they experienced hurt feelings. The accompanying music video includes a shot in which Bret and Jemaine are dressed as Mozart.

=== "Hurt Feelings" (Reprise) ===
An alternative version of "Hurt Feelings" featuring Murray, Mel, Doug, Greg, and Jemaine (with Bret doing background vocals) in which they hurtfully describe slights made against them by other characters in the episode resembling the song 'Wise Up' from Magnolia (film).

=== "Stay Cool" ===
Stay Cool features lyrics and choreography mimicking the performance of "Cool" from the musical West Side Story. Bret, Murray and their respective "gangs" confront their tormentors, dance style.

=== Other songs ===
At the very beginning of the episode, the Conchords are seen singing a brand new rap song at their library gig. Each line of the song consists of the name of a famous rapper followed by the words "is not very good". The exceptions are the announcement of the beginning and end of Jemaine's "bass solo" and the preceding line: "but the Rhymenoceros is very, very good", Rhymenoceros being Bret's rapping name.
