= What Goes on Tour =

- Flight of the Conchords episode
- Episode no.: Season 1 Episode 9
- Directed by: Paul Simms
- Written by: Paul Simms
- Production code: 109
- Original air date: August 12, 2007

Guest appearances
- Betsy Morgan (Blonde Girl); Emily Swallow (Becky); David Costabile (Doug); Kate Pierson (Club Owner)

Episode chronology
← Previous "Girlfriends"	Next → "New Fans"

"What Goes on Tour" is the ninth episode of the HBO comedy series Flight of the Conchords. This episode first aired in the United States on Sunday, August 12, 2007.

== Plot synopsis ==
At a band meeting, Murray has some really good news: a gig in Central Park. Since they will, in Murray's opinion, need to be at the top of their game, he has organised a warm-up tour for them. When Bret asks how they can afford to go on tour, Murray says he has dipped into the band's "emergency fund". He flashes an envelope of cash but won't tell them where he got the money.

In the car on the way to their first gig, Murray gets a call from his wife Shelley. They had been separated but are back together now. Bret learns from his phone conversation that the 'emergency fund' came from their joint cheque account, and that Murray hadn't told his wife that he had taken it to use for the tour. They also find out that Mel and Doug have been following their car.

The first gig of the tour turns out to be in dark lounge of a hotel next to LaGuardia Airport. After the gig, Murray gives the boys a per diem but is annoyed when he discovers they have spent all the money on leather suits. He intended the "per diem" to last all week. They try to give Murray a gift they had bought for him, but an annoyed Murray refuses without looking at it.

Up in the hotel room, Jemaine is trying to watch TV; however, Bret has to hold it in the air in order to get a decent reception. When his arms tire, he puts the TV down on the window sill, but it falls out the window. This results in Murray having to pay for a new TV out of the tour funds. Later at the next gig in Passaic, Jemaine clumsily damages a club amplifier, leaving Murray further out of pocket.

When they turn up at their next gig, they find their reputation for damaging equipment has preceded them and the club owner turns them away.

That night at the bar, Bret and Jemaine are invited to sit with the members of the North Jersey University Women's Water Polo team. After finding out they are in a band, the women ask for their autographs and suggest partying in the boys' room. Bret and Jemaine head upstairs first and, on the way up to their room, sing "Mermaid".

The guys wait all night, with Murray banished to sleep in the bathroom, but the women do not show up. The next morning, they discover that the team has used their autographs and room number to charge a large bar bill to the band's room. To make things worse, Bret fails to put the parking brake on in Murray's car after parking it, causing it to slide into a swimming pool.

A furious Murray quits as manager and storms off to walk home. Left without a way home, Bret and Jemaine are forced to ask Mel and Doug for a lift. When they catch up with Murray on the highway, they successfully manage to make up with him by giving him the gift they had bought for him earlier. It turns out to be a leather suit just like theirs.

The happy threesome head for their final gig in 'Central Park'. The band discovers, however, that Murray has misled them. The gig turns out to be in "a central park" in Newark.

The concert is titled Newark Summer Jam '07.

Over the end credits, we see Murray on his mobile phone trying to explain to his boss why he has been absent from work all week.

== Notes ==
- Bret reveals his 'secret' last name - McClegnie - a scrambled version of the actor's real name.
- We learn that the name of Murray's wife is Shelley.
- Becky of the water polo team has the same trouble with Bret's first name that Coco does in the "Bret Gives Up the Dream" episode.
- The name of the band is misspelt on the information board at the gig in the lounge of a hotel at LaGuardia Airport. It is "Flight of the Concordes."

== Songs ==
The following songs are featured in this episode:

=== "Mermaid" ===
There was only one full song in this episode, "Mermaid" (a.k.a. Mermaids). The boys imagine the girls of the water polo team are mermaids and sing an ode to the mythical creatures in a lounge act vocal style.

=== Other songs ===
Bret and Jemaine play a fragment of "Rock the Party" at the gig in the hotel lounge. In the park at the end of the episode, when Murray is on the phone, we can see the boys on stage in the background playing the intro music for "Robots".

== Cultural references ==
The club owner that turns the band away is played by Kate Pierson, founder and lead singer of The B-52's.

When blaming Jemaine for dropping the TV out the window, Murray likens him to Keith Moon, drummer for The Who and notorious destroyer of hotel rooms. There is also a famous, possibly apocryphal, tale where Moon drove a car into a swimming pool — as Bret ends up doing later in the episode.

Midway through the episode, during a montage of tour scenes, a piano piece can be heard playing that is almost identical to the piano intro to the Mötley Crüe song "Home Sweet Home". The music video for "Home Sweet Home" also features scenes of a band on tour.

== Filming locations ==
- LaGuardia Airport Hotel
