= Hurt Feelings (Flight of the Conchords song) =

Single by Flight of the Conchords

from the album I Told You I Was Freaky
- Released: 2 February 2009
- Genre: Comedy
- Length: 2:38
- Songwriter(s): Jemaine Clement; Bret McKenzie

Flight of the Conchords singles chronology
"Business Time" (2008)	"Hurt Feelings" (2009)	"Pencils in the Wind" (2009)

"Hurt Feelings" is the first single from I Told You I Was Freaky, the second album from Flight of the Conchords. The song was released digitally through iTunes on February 2, 2009, after the song premiered on the television series, Flight of the Concords, on the previous night.

"Hurt Feelings" is a rap song in which Bret McKenzie and Jemaine Clement describe occasions on which they experienced hurt feelings. The accompanying music video includes a shot in which McKenzie and Clement are dressed as Mozart. An alternative version of "Hurt Feelings" (the reprise) featuring Murray, Mel, Doug, Greg, and Clement (with McKenzie doing background vocals) in which they hurtfully describe slights made against them by other characters in the episode.

== Charts ==
Chart	Peak position
New Zealand Singles Chart	36
Triple J Hottest 100 2009	30
