= A Dog's Show =

- Presented by: John Gordon
- Opening theme: "Flowers on the Wall"
- Country of origin: New Zealand

Original release
- Network: TVNZ 1
- Release: 1977 – 1992

A Dog's Show is a New Zealand television series featuring sheepdog trials, presented by John Gordon. For many years it screened on TV ONE on Sundays at 6pm (before the evening news). It was broadcast between 1977 and 1992. The series was replaced in 1993 with Tux Wonder Dogs, which screened until 1999, and again from 2004 to 2005, and was hosted by Mark Leishman. Repeats were later screened on TVNZ 6 at 11pm.

== Theme Music ==
The theme music was an instrumental version of the Statler Brothers song Flowers on the Wall.

== In popular culture ==
In Drive By, the seventh episode of the HBO comedy series Flight of the Conchords, A Dog's Show is the first show on the tape of New Zealand television programmes that Murray received from his mother. Bret McKenzie has stated that he is a fan.
