= Murray Takes It to the Next Level =

- Flight of the Conchords episode
- Episode no.: Season 2 Episode 4
- Directed by: Troy Miller
- Written by: James Bobin, Jemaine Clement, and Bret McKenzie
- Production code: 204
- Original air date: February 8, 2009

Guest appearances
- Jim Gaffigan (Jim); Frank Wood (Greg)

Episode chronology
← Previous "The Tough Brets"	Next → "Unnatural Love"

"Murray Takes It to the Next Level" is the fourth episode of the second season of the HBO comedy series Flight of the Conchords. This episode first aired in the United States on February 8, 2009. In the episode, Murray tries to elevate Bret and Jemaine on his friendship graph, bringing his questioning pal Jim in on the plan. Mel demands an apology from Bret for inappropriate behavior that she dreamed about.

== Plot ==
At a band meeting, Murray (Rhys Darby) invites Jemaine (Jemaine Clement) and Bret (Bret McKenzie) to take it to the "next level" on his friendship graph — to go beyond their current status of "work mates" and surpass the status of "colleagues" (such as Greg (Frank Wood)) to become "friends." Murray also alludes to his "best friend" Jim many times. After attempting activities together such as watching a movie, making a fort and "having a sleep," Bret and Jemaine rise up the graph to attain the status of friends. Murray deems it time they meet Jim, and invites the three to a barbecue, where the inquisitive Jim (Jim Gaffigan) meets Bret and Jemaine, and questions them extensively.

Telephoning Bret and Jemaine later to ask if they want to hang out, Jim takes offense when Bret relays Jemaine's statement that Jim is a "dick." A series of further mishaps, such as turning Murray's desk into a table tennis table, sees Bret and Jemaine relegated down the graph, ending up below their original status of "work mates," as "strangers." Murray says he will see them at the next band meeting, although they will "not know each other." He then introduces himself and departs with Jim (whose inquisitive nature suits Murray fine).

Meanwhile, Mel (Kristen Schaal) finds Bret and Jemaine and thanks Bret for an unspecified thing he did in her dream last night. Later, however, she reproaches Bret for something else (unheard by the viewer, but which disgusts and horrifies Jemaine) that he did in her next dream. Mel demands that Bret apologizes for his dream behavior, but it continues, and at Murray's martial arts club, Bret and Jemaine receive minor injuries from the furious Mel and Jim, respectively.

Despite Jim being Murray's best friend, he is not seen or mentioned again for the rest of the series.

== Songs ==
The following songs appear in this episode:

=== "Dreams" ===
Sung by Mel, "Dreams" is a wistful imagining of what life might be like if the world were more like Mel's dreams. Not unexpectedly, the accompanying video reveals that her dreams are dominated by images of Bret and Jemaine.

=== "Friends" ===
"Friends", an a capella song sung by Bret, Jemaine, Murray and Jim, describes the sorts of things friends do for each other.

== Filming location ==
The scene where Mel meets Bret and Jemaine on their bicycles and she sings "Dreams" was filmed on the corner of South 6th Street and Berry Street near the Williamsburg Bridge in Brooklyn.

Portions of the song "Friends" were filmed at a bowling alley called The Gutter Bar in Williamsburg, Brooklyn.

== Cultural references ==
Murray offers to show them the film The World's Fastest Indian (2005), a movie about the life of New Zealand motorcycle builder and racer Burt Munro.
