= Yoko (Flight of the Conchords) =

- Flight of the Conchords episode
- Episode no.: Season 1 Episode 4
- Directed by: Troy Miller
- Written by: James Bobin; Jemaine Clement; Bret McKenzie
- Production code: 104
- Original air date: July 8, 2007

Guest appearance
- Sutton Foster (Coco)

Episode chronology
← Previous "Mugged"	Next → "Sally Returns"

"Yoko" is the fourth episode of the HBO comedy series Flight of the Conchords. It first aired in the United States on Sunday, July 8, 2007.

This episode received an Emmy Award nomination in 2008 for "Outstanding Writing For A Comedy Series".

== Plot synopsis ==
Murray tries to interest Bret and Jemaine in his tour of New York band rotundas. However, Bret has a date with Coco, the girl he met at his sign-holding job. Jemaine tags along on the date, and quickly makes a habit of inviting himself along on all their dates. When Bret finally tells Jemaine that he doesn't want him to come on the dates any more, Jemaine and Murray's conclusion is that Coco is pulling a "Yoko Ono" and trying to break up the band. Bret takes Coco's side and quits the band. Ultimately, though, Murray and Jemaine come to realize they miss Bret again, and Jemaine convinces him to rejoin the band.

== Songs ==
=== "If You're Into It" ===
"If You're Into It" is a rewritten version of "Coco's Song". At Jemaine's insistence, the song's lyrics are simple and direct, describing what Bret would realistically like to do with Coco if she were "into it". These suggestions begin innocently, but quickly escalate to sexual fantasies, finally ending with a proposed threesome in a kitchen. Bret sings "If You're Into It" for Coco while sitting on the ledge of the Unisphere while Jemaine, who has tagged along on their date, sings the chorus.

=== "Pencils in the Wind" ===
"Pencils in the Wind" (also known as "Sellotape") is a heartfelt ode to the similarities between love and adhesive tape — generically referred to as Sellotape in many countries including New Zealand. It begins with Bret and Jemaine singing separately and in different locations — using split screen — and ends with most of the cast (Coco, Mel and Dave) and a large chorus of extras singing together in a night-time street scene, and concludes with Bret and Jemaine rising from the ground, in a similar manner to the end of Grease and the music video for "It's Oh So Quiet" by Björk. The long coda, with scat singing, is of a similar style to Hey Jude.

=== Other songs ===
"Coco's Song" is Bret's love song for Coco. Though only pieces of the song are featured in the episode, it is mentioned that the song is two hours long. Jemaine questions the commitments Bret makes, such as to "climb the highest mountain", and suggests that he rewrite the song with more realistic promises.

The song "She-Wolf" is only seen briefly as a song Jemaine is writing. It expresses his obvious dislike for, and mistrust of, Coco.

== Filming locations ==
- The giant metal sphere that can be seen in the background when Coco gets serenaded is the Unisphere in Flushing Meadows Park in Queens, New York.
- The amphitheatre in which Murray and Jemaine discuss Yoko Ono is the Corlears Hook Pavilion in East River Park on the Lower East Side of Manhattan, at coordinates 40°42′40.3″N 73°58′40.4″W.
- After Jemaine asks Bret to rejoin the band, the bus they (and Coco) are on drives down Court Street in Cobble Hill, Brooklyn
