= Hurt Feelings =

Hurt feelings may refer to:

- "Hurt feelings", a subtype of social pain
- "Hurt Feelings" (Flight of the Conchords song), 2009
- "Hurt Feelings" (Mac Miller song), 2018
- "Hurt Feelings", a song by Halsey from her album The Great Impersonator (2024)

== See also ==
- "Hurting the feelings of the Chinese people", a Chinese political catchphrase
