= Unnatural Love =

- Flight of the Conchords episode
- Episode no.: Season 2 Episode 5
- Directed by: Michel Gondry
- Written by: Iain Morris & Damon Beesley
- Production code: 205
- Original air date: February 15, 2009

Guest appearances
- Sarah Wynter (Keitha); Dena Kaplan (Keitha's housemate); Victoria Cesarski (Keitha's housemate); José Ramón Rosario (Hansom Cab driver)

Episode chronology
← Previous "Murray Takes It to the Next Level"	Next → "Love Is a Weapon of Choice"

"Unnatural Love" is the fifth episode of the second season of the HBO comedy series Flight of the Conchords, and the seventeenth episode overall. It first aired on February 15, 2009. The episode was directed by Michel Gondry and written by Iain Morris and Damon Beesley. Jemaine Clement and Bret McKenzie of the band Flight of the Conchords star as fictional versions of themselves. The plot focuses on Jemaine's forbidden romance with the Australian Keitha (Sarah Wynter), which chagrins his fellow New Zealanders Bret and Murray (Rhys Darby), the band's manager.

"Unnatural Love" was well received by critics. It earned Clement a 2009 Emmy nomination for Best Comedy Actor and received two Creative Arts Emmy nominations, one for Outstanding Sound Mixing and one for Outstanding Original Music and Lyrics for the song "Carol Brown". The two songs featured in the episode, "Too Many Dicks (On the Dancefloor)" and "Carol Brown", were well received critically and subsequently appeared on the album I Told You I Was Freaky.

== Plot ==
Jemaine with Keitha (Sarah Wynter)

Murray (Rhys Darby) brings a reluctant Bret (Bret McKenzie) and Jemaine (Jemaine Clement) to a nightclub to experience "dancing music", recruiting their friend Dave (Arj Barker) to compel them inside. Finding the club overpopulated with men, the three sing "Too Many Dicks (On the Dancefloor)". Jemaine goes home with a woman (Sarah Wynter), but when he awakes the next morning, he finds himself surrounded by Australian memorabilia. He suspects he has slept with an Australian, a major taboo for New Zealanders, and attempts to sneak out, calling Bret for help when he cannot unlock the door. However, the woman catches him and introduces herself as Keitha, a rough, crude Australian.

Keitha asks Jemaine to stay longer, but he leaves and goes straight to the doctor to get tested for sexually transmitted diseases. Later, at a band meeting with Murray, Bret reveals Jemaine's escapade. Bret and Murray express their shock and dismay, even contemplating temporarily ejecting Jemaine from the band. Jemaine realizes he has left his wallet in Keitha's apartment and goes back to retrieve it; while there, he questions Keitha over tea about her family background to determine exactly how Australian she is. She explains that she is quite Australian, proudly descended from criminals, and invites him back to bed.

Jemaine and Keitha start dating. He introduces her to Bret and Murray, but they refuse to accept her. Later, Bret unsuccessfully attempts to fool Jemaine by poorly mimicking Keitha's voice and leaving a fake break-up message on the answering machine. Jemaine goes to Keitha's apartment, where he learns her two Australian housemates similarly disapprove of him (though Keitha states this is not because he is from New Zealand, but because they consider him a "dick" and not attractive enough for her), but that she likes him regardless. Jemaine sings "Carol Brown" to express his desire for a long-term relationship with her.

Jemaine and Keitha decide to elope to New Jersey, with the assistance of Dave, who approves of their forbidden love. However, Keitha fails to show up at their predetermined meeting spot. Jemaine realizes something is amiss when the carriage driver explains he cannot go to New Jersey, despite Keitha's earlier claims. Jemaine rushes home, where he discovers Keitha and her friends have cleaned out the apartment and duct taped Bret to the door. Jemaine hugs Bret while the latter is still taped to the door, and Bret reluctantly comforts him as he cries.

== Production ==
"Unnatural Love" was written by Iain Morris and Damon Beesley, who also wrote the Season 1 episode "The Actor". It was directed by Michel Gondry, who brought his characteristic visual style to the episode, particularly the music scenes.

The bouncer at the night club who leads the conga line during "Too Many Dicks on the Dance Floor" is Randy Jones, the original cowboy from the disco group Village People.

The khaki shirt and shorts that Jemaine is wearing when Bret and Murray first meet Keitha is a reference to Steve Irwin.

When Jemaine calls Bret the morning after sleeping with Keitha, Bret is reading A. W. B. Powell's Native Animals of New Zealand, a commonly used reference book in New Zealand classrooms. The book is an iconic piece of kiwiana and is frequently cited as an inspiration by New Zealand visual artists.

== Songs ==
The following songs appear in this episode:

=== "Too Many Dicks (On the Dance Floor)" ===
After Dave asks Bret and Jemaine to give him more space on the dance floor, the band sings this dance track about a nightclub populated by too many men. Arj Barker as Dave provides a guest rap.

Flight of the Conchords included "Too Many Dicks" on their 2009 album I Told You I Was Freaky, and several reviewers singled it out for praise. Jamie Crossan of NME called the song "undeniably the highlight" of the album. Jason Lymangrover of AllMusic similarly considered it one of the album's stronger tracks. David Gassman of PopMatters particularly praised Arj Barker's guest appearance as elevating the song's humor. Zach Kelly of Pitchfork approvingly called "Too Many Dicks" a "trashy B-more club bounce" that worked even outside the context of the episode. Similarly, Maddy Costa of The Guardian found it one of the songs that holds up well regardless of prior knowledge of its musical references or the episode. On the other hand, Genevieve Koski of The A.V. Club considered the song "hilarious in the context of the T.V. show", but believed it ran together with other similar songs when devoid of the visuals.

=== "Carol Brown" ===
Jemaine's budding romance with Keitha inspires him to sing "Carol Brown". In the lyrics Jemaine details the various ways his previous girlfriends left him, including the titular Carol Brown, who "just took a bus out of town". He is accompanied by a chorus of all his ex-girlfriends, who appear in video projected behind him to sing about his many deficiencies as a boyfriend. Jemaine and Bret play contraptions consisting of guitar necks attached to video editing equipment; Bret's device affects the scene as he moves its controls.

The song was written by Clement and McKenzie with series co-creator James Bobin. Sia, Alison Sudol, Inara George, Nadia Ackerman, Jo Bobin, and Victoria Bobin provide vocals for the chorus of ex-girlfriends.

"Carol Brown" earned Flight of the Conchords a Creative Arts Emmy nomination for Outstanding Original Music and Lyrics in 2009. Television critic Alan Sepinwall enjoyed both songs, but considered the "Carol Brown" sequence "perfection", finding that director Michel Gondry's handling of the visuals complemented the music particularly well. The Conchords included "Carol Brown" on I Told You I Was Freaky, and several reviewers identified it as a highlight of the album. Sarah Rodman of The Boston Globe called it "the album's masterpiece", writing that its "fun mash-up of lo-fi alterna-folk Casio tones and swell Burt Bacharach backing vocals" humorously undercut the downbeat subject matter. Huw Jones of Slant Magazine called the song "conceivably the Conchords' most formidable piece of songwriting to date". Genevieve Koski of The A.V. Club called it one of Flight of the Conchords' "best individual tracks". Mike Diver of BBC Music found it one of the album's better songs, calling it "subdued of arrangement and all the more delightful for it". Jamie Crossan of NME praised it as "lush LOLsome twee pop". Zeth Lundy of the Boston Phoenix commended "Carol Brown" for emphasizing songwriting more than other "Weird Al-style" musical parodies on the album.

== Broadcast and reception ==
"Unnatural Love" first aired on HBO February 15, 2009. It received over 826,000 viewers. The episode was well received by critics. Time television critic James Poniewozik gave it an "honorable mention" in his list of the best television episodes of 2009, the only Flight of the Conchords episode he included. Critic Alan Sepinwall wrote in The Star-Ledger that both the comedy and music in "Unnatural Love" represented Flight of the Conchords "functioning at peak level", finding that the strong songs and their associated video sequences set the episode above others of the second season. He also appreciated Gondry's direction and the humorously stereotyped characterization of Keitha, as well as the "unexpected judgmental side" she exposed in Bret. Similarly, Kyle Ryan of The A.V. Club considered the music to be an improvement over previous Season 2 episodes. He further praised the Australian jokes and the contributions of Gondry and Arj Barker, giving the episode an A−. Matt Fowler of IGN rated the episode 9 out of 10, praising the over-the-top portrayal of the Australian-New Zealand discord and the song "Carol Brown".

"Unnatural Love" earned Clement a nomination for Outstanding Lead Actor in a Comedy Series at the 61st Primetime Emmy Awards in 2009. It also earned two Creative Arts Emmy nominations, one for Outstanding Original Music and Lyrics for "Carol Brown", and a second for Outstanding Sound Mixing for a Comedy or Drama Series (Half-Hour) and Animation.
