= Girlfriends (Flight of the Conchords) =

- Flight of the Conchords episode
- Episode no.: Season 1 Episode 8
- Directed by: James Bobin
- Written by: Eric Kaplan
- Production code: 108
- Original air date: August 5, 2007

Guest appearances
- Eliza Coupe (Lisa); June Raphael (Felicia); Adrian Martinez (A.J. Jones); Eugene Mirman (Eugene); Megan Neuringer (Lisa's friend)

Episode chronology
| ← Previous "Drive By" | Next → "What Goes on Tour" |

"Girlfriends" is the eighth episode of the HBO comedy series Flight of the Conchords. This episode first aired in the United States on Sunday, August 5, 2007.

== Plot synopsis ==
Jemaine has his eye on a woman that works at the bakery. He wants Bret to go in the shop with him, but Bret is reluctant because he doesn't like croissants. Eventually, Jemaine convinces him to be his 'wingman'. While speaking to the woman and her colleague, Jemaine tries speaking a bit of French and they launch into a 1960s French style music video singing "Foux du Fafa".

Later, on a double date at a nightclub, Jemaine is having trouble getting Lisa, the woman he liked at the croissant shop, interested in him. He convinces Bret to swap partners, but has no better luck with Felicia. Meanwhile, Bret is uncomfortable with Lisa's aggressive advances.

At a band meeting, Jemaine tells Murray about their new 'girlfriends'. At first a concerned Murray tells them that he thinks bands shouldn't have girlfriends, citing Wham! as an example of a successful band that followed that principle. But then he interrogates the guys for the juicy details. He then tells them that he has some good news. He has met A.J. Jones, supposedly the brother of Quincy Jones, who has sold him a high-end stereo system for $50.

Back at the apartment, Bret finds a message from Lisa on the answerphone. At first he is reluctant to go out with her again, but Jemaine and Eugene convince him to go. Eugene suggests that he show less skin.

Murray meets with A.J. to pick up the stereo. The very dodgy-looking A.J. is clearly no relation to Quincy Jones, but Murray is oblivious to the clues. Murray asks A.J. if he can arrange a meeting with Quincy to play him a demo of the band. After hearing the track A.J. offers to use his contacts to get some CDs made and Murray eagerly accepts the offer.

On another double date, Lisa aggressively comes onto Bret once again while Jemaine tries awkwardly to make headway with a clearly uninterested Felicia. When Bret tries to leave, Lisa goes with him and invites herself up to the apartment. Lisa demands sex, but Bret refuses. Another music video begins, and Bret sings "A Kiss Is Not A Contract".

The next morning Jemaine queries Bret as to how he managed to get Lisa wanting sex from him. Bret tells him that all he did was say he didn't want it. Meanwhile Murray has received the new CDs from A.J. and sets up a street stall to sell them. The only person who buys one however is an excited Mel.

Bret and Jemaine visit Dave for some advice. Bret wants to know how to deal with Lisa. Dave tells him it is his duty to give in to her demands.

On their next date, Lisa tells Bret that she is a Delta Force sniper and that she is being deployed to Iraq the next day. She successfully convinces him that the least he can do is sleep with her on her last night before going to war. The sex that results leaves Bret feeling violated. Elsewhere Jemaine tries out Bret's technique on Felicia, telling her that he doesn't want to have sex. However it backfires when she agrees that she doesn't want to sleep with him either.

Murray reports to the band on his disappointing sales. When they examine the boxes of CDs, they discover that A.J. has cheated them: all but one are filled with sawdust. Later Bret and Jemaine see Lisa back working at the bakery. When Bret questions her, she dumps him. There is some good news however. Murray has found a way to recoup some of the money they lost on the CD deal. He sells them to Dave, who plans to delete the music tracks and resell them as blank CDs.

== Songs ==
The following songs are featured in this episode:

=== "Foux du Fafa" ===
"Foux du Fafa" (a.k.a. Foux Da Fa Fa), is sung in French but consists almost entirely of beginner French phrases such as "Où est la bibliotheque?" (Where is the library?) that the Conchords try to make sound seductive, many of which contain grammatical errors. Their efforts are stopped short when Jemaine cannot understand the phrase "Où est la piscine?" (Where is the swimming pool?). The title itself, "Foux du Fafa", is a nonsense phrase and has no meaning in French. The visuals that accompany this song are in the style of a 1960s Scopitone music video.

=== "K.I.S.S.I.N.G." ===
'"K.I.S.S.I.N.G." (a.k.a. A Kiss Is Not a Contract) is sung by Bret after Lisa wakes him to solicit sex. The song talks about how kissing shouldn't necessarily lead to anything else. The video that accompanies the song mimics the style of the video for the Serge Gainsbourg song "Ballade De Melody Nelson".

Also, there is an instrumental version of "Rock the Party" heard at the beginning of Bret and Lisa's second date.

== Cultural references ==
The episode contains several references to the film Top Gun and the concept of a 'wingman' where one friend helps another get dates, although Jemaine claims not to know the film.

At one point, Murray asks for examples of records Quincy Jones made. Bret then mentions Michael Jackson's Off the Wall, which Murray mistakes as a comment about Michael Jackson's legendary antics.

== Filming locations ==
The cafe scenes were filmed at Fabiane's Cafe and Pastry in Williamsburg, Brooklyn.

The outdoor scenes during the song "Foux du Fafa" were filmed in McGolrick Park in Greenpoint, Brooklyn.
