= Drive By (Flight of the Conchords) =

- Flight of the Conchords episode
- The fruit vendor insults Bret and Jemaine
- Episode no.: Season 1 Episode 7
- Directed by: Taika Waititi
- Written by: Taika Waititi
- Production code: 107
- Original air date: July 29, 2007

Guest appearances
- Aziz Ansari (Sinjay); Kevin Allison (Customer); Joan Hess (Jessica); Jon Budinoff (Boy on bus); Sylvia Kauders (Lady on bus); Frank Wood (Greg)

Episode chronology
← Previous "Bowie"	Next → "Girlfriends"

"Drive By" is the seventh episode of the HBO comedy series Flight of the Conchords. The episode first aired in the United States on Sunday, July 29, 2007.

== Plot synopsis ==
A sidewalk fruit vendor, Sinjay (Aziz Ansari), refuses Bret and Jemaine service due to the fact that they are New Zealanders. He disinfects the fruit they touch, and they leave empty handed.

They visit the consulate for a band meeting, where Bret is clearly upset about the incident. There they meet Jessica (Joan Hess), the pretty blonde tech support lady who is upgrading the consulate's computers from aging VIC-20s to newer IBM PCs. After she leaves, Murray tells the band that he is in love with her. Bret asks Murray about his wife, Shelley, and Murray reminds them that they are separated. Bret receives a package from home — his favorite cardboard box — and Murray lends them a tape of New Zealand TV shows that he received from his mother.

At their apartment, the pair discuss the incident while they watch some of the recorded shows on Murray's tape. One of the shows is episode six of a children's program called "Albi The Racist Dragon". Bret, still upset about the vendor's attitude, watches from the comfort of his cardboard box.

At Mohumbhai & Son, Bret and Jemaine consult Dave about the racism they experienced. Dave informs them of the great amount of "prejudism" against the English that exists in America. Ignoring their insistence that they are not English, Dave admits that even he hates them sometimes. A montage of scenes follow in which we see Jemaine and Bret being jostled on the street, being denied entry to a nightclub, getting cheated by a hot dog vendor, and being forced to ride at the back of a bus.

They try once more to buy fruit from Sinjay but are chased off again. The frustrated pair ride off on their bicycles singing "Mutha Uckas".

At another band meeting, Murray fakes a computer problem in order to see Jessica again. He asks the band to help him with a love song he is writing for her (so far he has written one word — "Hi" — which Jemaine admits is better than he expected).

Back at their place, Bret, Jemaine and Dave try to come up with ideas for dealing with Sinjay. Dave suggests that they frame him for murder by poisoning his fruit, but settles for merely teaching Bret and Jemaine how to "flip the bird".

After Sinjay escalates the conflict by nailing a kiwi fruit to their door, the boys storm to his fruit stand to confront him. They furiously flip him the bird and chastise him for his racism. However they soon realize that he has New Zealanders and Australians mixed up, and it is actually Australians that he hates. Realizing his mistake, the vendor apologizes and gives them some free fruit.

Back at the consulate, Murray learns from Greg that Jessica is gone, as her upgrade work is complete. A despondent Murray sings "Leggy Blonde" to his lost love.

Over the end credits, we see shots of Bret, Jemaine and Sinjay flipping the bird to the guard at the Australian consulate.

== Notes ==
- We learn that Murray is married, which explains the wedding ring that he has been wearing in the preceding episodes.
- We discover that Dave is of Indian descent, as is Arj Barker, the actor who plays him.
- This is the only episode of the series in which Kristen Schaal (Mel) does not appear.

== Songs ==
Titles of fictitious program Albi

The following songs are featured in this episode:

=== "Albi the Racist Dragon" ===
"Albi the Racist Dragon", sung by Jemaine, concerns the eponymous dragon's persecution by an angry mob and subsequent redemption, through the companionship of one of his victims, a "badly-burned Albanian boy." It is mostly spoken word set to an animated sequence in a children's TV style. The animated sequence was directed by Oliver Dear, a storyboard artist and illustrator. The plot parodies the simplistic and ridiculous resolutions that occur in plots of children's TV shows.

As of December 2025, the song “Albi the Racist Dragon” has been removed from Spotify but it is still available on Apple Music.

=== "Mutha'uckas" ===
"Mutha'uckas" features Jemaine and Bret singing about their frustration with the racist vendor and other annoyances of daily life.

=== "Leggy Blonde" ===
"Leggy Blonde" is a love song, sung by Murray, about Jessica, the tech support lady. Bret and Jemaine sing backup, and other consulate staff provide percussion using office supplies.

== Cultural references ==
The first TV show we see them watch on Murray's video tape is A Dog's Show. This is a real New Zealand television show from the 1980s that broadcast sheepdog trial competitions.

After this, we hear an ad for What Have You Done to My House?, another TV show. This show is fictional, but satirizes a number of shows with the same premise.

In the advertisement for the New Zealand's Library telephone service, the man (Taika Waititi — the writer and director of this episode) asks to reserve the new Gipsy Kings album. The Gipsy Kings are a French band.

Dave makes reference to the film Escape from Alcatraz.

== Filming locations ==
- The scenes during the song "Mutha Uckers" with Bret and Jemaine on bicycles were filmed on Ludlow Street, between Canal Street and Hester Street in Manhattan. The bicycle-bouncing shots were filmed nearby at the Worth St end of Columbus Park.
- Bret and Jemaine confront Sinjay with their "offensive hand gestures" on the corner of Mosco Street and Mulberry Street in front of Columbus Park.
