= Prime Minister (Flight of the Conchords) =

- Flight of the Conchords episode
- Episode no.: Season 2 Episode 7
- Directed by: James Bobin
- Written by: James Bobin; Jemaine Clement; Bret McKenzie
- Production code: 207
- Original air date: March 1, 2009

Guest appearances
- Patton Oswalt as Elton John Impersonator; Mary Lynn Rajskub as Karen; Art Garfunkel as himself; Brian Sergent as the Prime Minister; Louis Ortiz as Barack Obama impersonator

Episode chronology
← Previous "Love Is a Weapon of Choice"	Next → "New Zealand Town"

"Prime Minister" is the seventh episode of the second season of the HBO comedy series Flight of the Conchords. originally aired in the United States on March 1, 2009.

== Plot ==
Brett and Jemaine arrive at the New York New Zealand in New York Consulate over the impending arrival of the Prime Minister of New Zealand. Murray also announces that he has arranged a gig for Bret and Jemaine as Simon and Garfunkel impersonators. The pair object to playing other people's music, which Murray comments is better than theirs; they sell out for $50 each. At the nightclub, they perform an out-of-sync "Scarborough Fair", socialise with various musical impersonators, and Jemaine is picked up by an Art Garfunkel fanatic (Mary Lynn Rajskub).

The following day the Prime Minister of New Zealand, Brian, arrives and Murray has Jemaine and Bret give him a cultural tour of New York City. The subsequent tour of New York only shows them at the Pawn Shop discussing what reality is as per the movie The Matrix, the movie having only just come out in New Zealand (a decade after its USA release). Both Dave and Brian believe that the Matrix exists and that déjà vu is evidence of a glitch in it.

Jemaine goes on his dinner date with the Art Garfunkel fan, despite Mel's warnings that the other woman is deranged. The fan demands that he dress up as Art Garfunkel again for sex. The scene cuts out to the song "Demon Woman" in the music video style of Judas Priest.

Murray, Bret and Brian take the White House Tour in Washington, D.C., but are denied entry to see the president. The second song entitled "Oh, Dance, Baby" is performed by Bret in a Korean karaoke style.

Brian chews out Murray for his failure to set up a presidential meeting, but accepts Murray's formal apology. This leads to a party-planning discussion with the original Prime Ministerial BBQ becoming a rooftop fondue party. Murray hires a Barack Obama impersonator (Louis Ortiz) to attend, which is a success in fooling the Prime Minister. However, the Prime Minister spots two Elton John impersonators sneaking off together, believes this to be a glitch in the Matrix and runs to jump off the roof of the building.

Meanwhile, at his new girlfriend's house, Jemaine is shocked when the real Art Garfunkel turn ups and asks her to take him back, which she does. Whilst walking along the street Jemaine notices Mel and Doug, who is dressed in a Bret costume, making out in a parked car. He returns home to find Bret performing Paul Simon's 1980s solo work backed by a Ladysmith Black Mambazo-esque African vocal group.

== Songs ==
=== Demon Woman ===
Bret and Jemaine perform a song about Karen's psychotic behavior while wearing flashy shirts and skeleton costumes. This musical number is a spoof of the song "Devil Woman" by Cliff Richard.

=== Oh, Dance, Baby(오 그대여 춤추자) ===
Bret sings a Korean song about love in the form of karaoke. The video is a parody of the music videos produced specifically for karaokes; in this case, Bret sings in front of a karaoke screen with Engrish lyric subtitles and images of scenery (and Jemaine on a carousel) run in the background.

The song was originally a Mandarin song called "往事只能回味 (Wang Shi Zhi Neng Hui Wei)", composed by Taiwanese musician 刘家昌 (Liu Jia-Chang).
