= Duncan Sarkies =

New Zealand writer

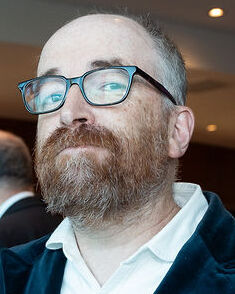
- Born: New Zealand
- Notable work: Two Little Boys (novel); Two Little Boys (film)

Comedy career
- Medium: Stand-up, screenwriter, playwright, novelist

Duncan Sarkies is a New Zealand screenwriter, playwright, stand-up comic, and novelist. He is best known for having co-written the script of Scarfies with his brother Robert Sarkies, who directed the film.

== Early life and education ==
Duncan Sarkies grew up in the South Island city of Dunedin.

He is the brother of film director and screenwriter Robert Sarkies.

== Career ==
Sarkies' is known for his creation of "eccentric plots and darkly comic portrayals of 'the outsider' and the disturbed".

He co-wrote, with his brother Robert, the script for Scarfies, a black comedy-crime thriller released in 1999.

In 1999 he also published a collection of short stories, Stray Thoughts and Nosebleeds.

He also wrote New Fans, the tenth episode of the comedy series Flight of the Conchords.

Sarkies debut novel, Two Little Boys was published in March 2008, and was made into a film of the same name, released in 2012.

In 2013 he published his second novel, Demolition of the Century. In 2025 he published his third novel, Star Gazers.

Sarkies took the part of Declan the Werewolf in Taika Waititi's 2014 film What We Do in the Shadows. Also in 2014, he was script editor on the 2014 ABC Television (Australia) series Soul Mates. He contributed to the writing of four episodes of Maximum Choppage, which aired on the ABC in 2015.

He directed, wrote, and co-created the 12-episode fantasy podcast series The Mysterious Secrets of Uncle Bertie's Botanarium, released in 2016 through Howl.

He has been a contributor to the American TV series, What We Do in the Shadows since 2019.

Sarkies assisted with story development for the documentary Wilbur: The King in the Ring, Julia Parnell's feature film that premiered at Doc Edge in 2017, after starting life as a short film in 2015 for Loading Docs.

== Other activities ==
As part of the 2022 Aotearoa New Zealand Festival of the Arts, Duncan hosted a series of online talks with New Zealand writers Pip Adam, Kirsten McDougall, and Rose Lu.

== Recognition and awards ==
Sarkies' work has been praised by critics for its originality.

His awards and fellowships include:

- 1994: Sunday Star-Times Bruce Mason Playwriting Award
- 1995: Chapman Tripp Theatre Award for Best New Zealand Play, for his 1994 work Saving Grace
- 1998: Louis Johnson New Writers' Bursary
- 2000: Montana New Zealand's Hubert Church NZSA Best First Book of Fiction Award, for his book of short stories Stray Thoughts and Nose Bleeds
- 2015: Grimshaw Sargeson Fellowship
- 2023: Residency at the Michael King Writers Centre in Auckland
- 2026: Star Gazers longlisted for the Jann Meddlicott Fiction Award at the Ockham New Zealand Book Awards.

== Personal life ==
As of 2026 Sarkies was living in Wellington.

== Selected works ==
=== Plays ===
- The Ceramic Camel (1993)
- Lovepuke (1993)*
- Saving Grace (1994)
- Snooze (1997)
- Twelve (1997)
- Blue Vein (1997)
- Special (1997)
- Bystander (1998)

*Published in Eleven Young Playwrights (1994)

=== Podcasts ===
- The Mysterious Secrets of Uncle Berties Botanarium

=== Novels ===
- Two Little Boys (2008)
- Demolition of the Century (2013)
- Star Gazers (2025)

=== Films ===
- Scarfies
- Two Little Boys

=== Television ===
- "New Fans" (2007), s1 e10 of Flight of the Conchords
- "The New Cup" (2009), s2 e2 of Flight of the Conchords
