= Love Is a Weapon of Choice =

- Flight of the Conchords episode
- Episode no.: Season 2 Episode 6
- Directed by: James Bobin
- Written by: Paul Simms
- Production code: 206
- Original air date: February 22, 2009

Guest appearance
- Kristen Wiig (Brahbrah)

Episode chronology
← Previous "Unnatural Love"	Next → "Prime Minister"

"Love Is A Weapon of Choice" is the sixth episode of the second season of the HBO comedy series Flight of the Conchords. This episode first aired in the United States on February 22, 2009.

== Plot synopsis ==
Bret and Jemaine both fall for a woman whose missing dog has epilepsy, leading to a duel, a canine benefit and a couple of new tunes.

== Plot ==
Jemaine and Bret are out for a jog when they are stopped by a woman (Kristen Wiig) who is searching for her epileptic terrier, Charlie. After they go on their way, the scene transitions into the song "We're Both in Love with a Sexy Lady." They meet up with the woman again, having "found" several dogs of varying breeds. She tells them that none of the dogs are hers, and shows them a picture of Charlie, who is wearing a kitten costume. She introduces herself by name, which Jemaine hears as "Barbara" and Bret hears as "Brahbrah." Jemaine informs Bret that there is no such name as "Brahbrah." The woman gives the boys her phone number, in case they find her epileptic terrier.

Both Jemaine and Bret decide to write a song about epileptic dogs. Bret continually mispronounces the word "epileptic" as "pepileptic" and Jemaine says "prophylactic" by mistake. The woman calls Bret to make a date, then asks to speak to Jemaine. Dates are set for both 7 and 8 o'clock respectively. While on the date with Bret, the woman tells him that she thinks Jemaine's glasses make him look intelligent. Bret lets her know of the song he is writing, while Jemaine shows up 15 minutes early for his date, carrying flowers. When Bret protests, the woman tells him that they can spend 15 minutes together another time, and Jemaine commences his date with her. He tells the woman that Bret is no good, but she says that she really likes Bret's beard, as he reminds her of a little puppy dog. Jemaine also tells her of his plan to write a song for epileptic dogs, and, not to be outdone by Bret, to hold a fundraiser for them.

On a second date, Bret shows up wearing a pair of Jemaine's glasses, and tells the woman that he is creating an antidote for epilepsy. She asks him if he's a veterinarian or doctor, and he says that he isn't, but he has thus far had no seizures. When the woman points out that he doesn't have epilepsy to begin with, Bret tells her that he thinks it is because of the antidote. The woman receives a call from someone saying they found Charlie, and gets up to leave. When she passes by the bar, Jemaine is there with a pasted-on beard. He was the one who called her, but she soon leaves to look for Charlie.

The boys are in the studio with Murray to record their song for epileptic dogs. Murray pauses the recording to ask who is playing the piano, confused by the idea of a backing track. They begin recording again when the woman shows up. Jemaine and Bret each try to outdo the other, and steal the mic back-and-forth before commencing a low-intensity physical altercation, which Murray breaks up. Bret challenges Jemaine to a duel, and Jemaine slaps him across the face with a glove he picked up from the floor. They then perform the song "Love Is a Weapon of Choice."

At the canine epilepsy fundraiser, the woman tells the boys that she has found Charlie. She is holding a little dog, but it appears not to be a terrier. The dog's rightful owner approaches and tells them that the dog's name is "Mocha," as stated on its dog tag. The woman relinquishes Mocha, and both boys fight to comfort her. They finally take the stage and perform their song, "Epileptic Dogs," accompanied by a slide presentation from Murray. They break into the "remix" portion of the song and strobe lights begin to flash, which triggers seizures in all the epileptic dogs in attendance.

Afterwards, Jemaine and Bret quarrel. Murray breaks it up and tells the woman that both of his lads fancy her, and she needs to choose one of them. He adds that she may also choose him if she prefers, and then departs. The woman tells Bret and Jemaine that she thought they were gay. As they stand stunned that she would think that, Mel shows up, desiring to show them an artwork she has created. It is a depiction of Bret and Jemaine as a couple, and what their baby might look like. Nonplussed, the woman tells them that she felt obligated to spend equal amounts of time with them because they were gay, but if they're straight, she'd rather spend time with Bret. She asks Bret to coffee. Bret asks if Jemaine may join them. Finally, the woman reveals that her name is in fact Brahbrah, and she spells it out. Bret and Brahbrah walk away from Jemaine, as Brahbrah reveals that Charlie has actually been missing for six years.

== Songs ==
The following songs appear in this episode:

=== "We're Both in Love with a Sexy Lady" ===
This is sung after the boys meet Brahbrah, and is how they each describe how they have fallen in love with a girl, before realizing they are both in love with the same girl. The song is a parody of R. Kelly's "Same Girl". Also influenced by "The Girl Is Mine", a duet by Michael Jackson and Paul McCartney in which the singers argue about a girl, both insisting repeatedly that 'the dog gone girl is mine'.

=== "Love Is a Weapon of Choice" ===
This is sung when Bret challenges Jemaine to a duel for the love of Brahbrah. Some of the images in the sequence are similar to those in the video for Bonnie Tyler's "Total Eclipse of the Heart."

=== "Epileptic Dogs" ===
This song is sung by the boys at a charity concert for epileptic dogs. The song is a success, until the end when they perform a "remix" and the stage is lit up with flashing lights, causing the dogs to have epileptic seizures.
