= New Fans =

- Flight of the Conchords episode
- Episode no.: Season 1 Episode 10
- Directed by: Taika Waititi
- Written by: Duncan Sarkies
- Production code: 110
- Original air date: August 19, 2007

Guest appearances
- Daryl Hall (Host); Sarah Burns (Summer); Heather Lawless (Rain); David Costabile (Doug); Inca Son (Themselves); Lisa Valenzuela (Herself); Frank Wood (Greg)

Episode chronology
← Previous "What Goes on Tour"	Next → "The Actor"

"New Fans" is the tenth episode of the HBO comedy series Flight of the Conchords. This episode first aired in the United States on Sunday, August 19, 2007.

== Plot synopsis ==
A performance at a local "World Music Jam" results in the Conchords gaining two new fans, but Mel is suspicious of the newcomers and their motives. Murray encourages the band to adopt a more "rock star" attitude.

== Plot ==
At a band meeting at a local restaurant, Murray and the band discuss ways to improve their 'rock' image. Murray announces that Mel has won the fan competition — the prize is to cook the guys dinner at her place.

After the meeting they head off to a gig which turns out to be a 'World Music Jam'. When it is their turn on stage they begin to perform "Rock The Party", but the show MC is unimpressed and stops them early.

Their performance has interested two girls at the bar though, Summer and Rain. They introduce themselves and flirt with the boys, much to Mel's displeasure. Murray encourages the guys to be seen drinking beer to improve their image despite the fact that Bret and Jemaine both dislike it.

Bret and Jemaine stop by Dave's place to borrow some "cool and sexy" clothes from him. Jemaine requests clothes that project a "casual Prince" image. Dave complains about his room-mates whom he vehemently denies are his parents.

At the consulate, Murray shows them how he answers the band's emails for them and demonstrates the webcams that he has had installed in their apartment without their knowledge. Murray is pleased that the girls from the gig have joined the fan club. He reminds them about the dinner with Mel but the guys have a double date with the two new fans. Murray insists that they go and implores them not to upset their old fans "like Zed Zed Top did".

Bret and Jemaine take Summer and Rain to dinner at Mel's place. Mel is hostile towards the new women and is defensive when asked about her husband, who Bret discovers has been banished to the basement. Mel tells Bret that she thinks the new fans are only interested in sex, which leads them to cut the dinner short and leave with Summer and Rain.

At Summer's place the girls offer the boys acid tabs which they are reluctant about, but they end up agreeing to take a sixteenth of a tab each. Afterwards, Summer suggests to Jemaine and Bret — separately — that they have a threesome, so each tries to send the other bandmate home. They soon discover that Summer meant her and the two guys. That idea doesn't appeal to the guys much, so they attempt to sneak out but Summer catches them.

When they tell Murray about the new fans giving them drugs and wanting to have a threesome, he is impressed. He thinks it is very "rock and roll." Unfortunately it turns out that Summer and Rain have now dropped out of the fan club. So has an upset Mel, leaving them fanless.

During the end credits, Bret and Jemaine are talking in bed about the threesome the night before. It turns out that Summer "dropped out early" and Jemaine went to bed, so it was just Brett "for a while." Murray rings them to tell them to get some sleep. He has been watching on the webcam — and so, it seems, has Mel.

== Notes ==
- We learn that Dave lives with his parents.
- The host of the "World Music Jam" is played by singer Daryl Hall of Hall & Oates.
- In Mel's bathroom, she has a picture of Bret and Jemaine's head on the same naked body (polycephaly). Bret later hallucinates this same image during his "Prince of Parties" LSD trip.
- Director Taika Waititi and writer Duncan Sarkies have worked together before. Sarkies was the writer of the 1999 New Zealand film Scarfies, in which Waititi starred.

== Songs ==
The following songs are featured in this episode:

=== "Ladies of the World" ===
"Ladies of the World" (a.k.a. "Something Special for the Ladies") is an ode to all the women of the world and a plea to make love, not war. Bret and Jemaine begin singing this song after they notice that there are a lot of hot women at the world music gig. Part of the song in which Bret and Jemaine rap is similar to MC Miker G. and Deejay Sven's "Holiday Rap".

=== "The Prince of Parties" ===
After taking some acid, the hallucinating boys sing "The Prince of Parties", a song with appropriately trippy lyrics and a video featuring Bret, Jemaine, Mel, Summer and Rain dancing around a forest glade tempted by a satyr played by Murray. The song is reminiscent of the later work of the Beatles (including a reference to Sitar guru Ravi Shankar), as is the imagery shown while the song is playing, which appears to be inspired by the video for Rain. Also the psychedelic music made by Donovan in the late 1960s, complete with trippy wordplay, and fey vocals is clearly an inspiration on the song.

=== Other songs ===
The band begins to play "Rock the Party" at the world music gig, but are cut short by the MC.
