= Bret Gives Up the Dream =

- Flight of the Conchords episode
- Bret as a human billboard
- Episode no.: Season 1 Episode 2
- Directed by: James Bobin
- Written by: James Bobin; Jemaine Clement; Bret McKenzie
- Production code: 102
- Original air date: June 24, 2007

Guest appearances
- Sutton Foster (Coco); Eugene Mirman (Eugene); David Costabile (Doug); Frank Wood (Greg); Eddie Pepitone (Eddie); James Smith (Maxwell)

Episode chronology
← Previous "Sally"	Next → "Mugged"

"Bret Gives Up the Dream" is the second episode of the HBO comedy series Flight of the Conchords. The episode first aired in the United States on Sunday, June 24, 2007.

A song in this episode, "Inner City Pressure", received an Emmy Award nomination in 2008 for "Outstanding Original Music And Lyrics".

== Plot synopsis ==
Starved for cash, Bret and Jemaine apply for jobs as human billboards. Only Bret gets the job however, which causes problems when the band finally gets a gig at a travel expo. Murray and Jemaine confront Bret at his new job, and this leads to a debate on the chicken/egg causality dilemma. Unable to attend because of his job, Bret records his part onto a cassette tape for Jemaine to play along with. Murray decides the tape is as good as the real thing and fires Bret. At the travel fair, Murray and Jemaine's efforts to promote New Zealand are ridiculed by a smug Australian official, Maxwell (James Smith), and his contingent of bikini girls. Meanwhile, Bret develops a crush on Coco, a new arrival to the sign holding team.

Dave (Arj Barker) is not credited in this episode, even though he is seen in a shot in the song "Inner City Pressure."

== Songs ==
The following songs are featured in this episode.

=== "Inner City Pressure" ===
"Inner City Pressure" begins near the start of the episode, after Bret and Jemaine lament their poor financial state upon having to resort to eating food Bret has found on the street. The song and video are performed in the style of "West End Girls" by the Pet Shop Boys.

=== "Boom" ===
"Boom" is an inner monologue sung by Bret while conversing with Coco, the attractive new sign holder. The song is performed in an electronic/dancehall style similar to that of Jamaican artist Shaggy. The lyrics centre around his attraction to Coco but are distinguished by the fact that nearly all nouns are replaced by the word "boom". The accompanying video features Bret and Coco dancing in front of an animated background and has strong similarities to The Black Eyed Peas' "Hey Mama" video. Also featured prominently during this sequence is a 1980s Casio DG20 digital guitar (set to mandolin).

=== Other songs ===
The end of "Rock the Party" is seen being performed by Jemaine at the Travel Expo. Bret is not present, but he provides musical accompaniment and back-up vocals via a pre-recorded cassette tape. This song, whose lyrics consist mostly of the words "rock the party", makes an appearance in several future episodes.

== Cultural references ==
The Toothbrush fence that Murray refers to is an existing attraction. It can be found near Te Pahu, a small town 30 km southwest of the city of Hamilton, New Zealand. It is one of a number of other novelty fence tourist attractions that can be found in New Zealand, such as the Cardrona Bra Fence.

== Broadcast and reception ==
"Bret Gives Up the Dream" debuted on HBO on June 24, 2007. The episode received over 973,000 viewers, a decrease from the first episode's 1.2 million views.
