= Sally Returns =

- Flight of the Conchords episode
- Jemaine bumps into Sally at a laundromat
- Episode no.: Season 1 Episode 5
- Directed by: James Bobin
- Written by: James Bobin; Jemaine Clement; Bret McKenzie
- Production code: 105
- Original air date: July 15, 2007

Guest appearances
- Rachel Blanchard (Sally); Sutton Foster (Coco); Eugene Mirman (Eugene); Frank Wood (Greg); Ramsey Faragallah (Doorman); Murray Bartlett (Mark)

Episode chronology
← Previous "Yoko"	Next → "Bowie"

"Sally Returns" is the fifth episode of the HBO comedy series Flight of the Conchords. It first aired in the United States on Sunday, July 15, 2007.

This episode received an Emmy Award nomination in 2008 for "Outstanding Directing For A Comedy Series".

== Plot synopsis ==
After a chance meeting at the laundromat, Jemaine reconnects with Sally. She is interested in resuming their relationship but tells him that they have no future while he remains roommates with Bret. Jemaine immediately announces that he is moving out but refuses to tell a perplexed Bret that it is because of Sally.

At a band meeting, Murray announces that he has started a "band investment portfolio". He has been creaming a bit off the band income and has purchased some real estate — three stars for fifty dollars each. Bret is pleased but Jemaine thinks it's a waste of money. Later in the episode they learn that Jemaine's star has gone supernova.

Jemaine takes Bret and Murray to see his new apartment. It turns out to be an empty cleaning cupboard, which Murray dubs a "compartment". When Jemaine announces he has to leave on a date, Bret quickly works out that it is with Sally. A jealous Bret takes Coco on a date to the same restaurant to which Jemaine has taken Sally. After dinner we learn that Sally is having a birthday party which happens to conflict with Jemaine's housewarming.

In the week leading up to the parties, the two band-mates launch into an escalating competition to craft the most thoughtful and beautiful birthday present for Sally.

At the housewarming, Jemaine learns that Bret has gone to Sally's party instead, so he abandons it also and rushes to Sally's place. However at Sally's party they both get a shock — she tells them that she is engaged to Mark, an Australian former boyfriend. Mark has given her a BMW, which vastly outshines the creepy gifts that Bret and Jemaine have made. The two are heartbroken.

Walking home, Bret asks Jemaine to move back in. Jemaine agrees and then passes on a message from Coco — she has decided to dump Bret due to his obsession with Sally.

== Notes ==
- This episode is the conclusion of both the Sally and Coco story lines.
- When Bret and Jemaine arrive at Jemaine's new apartment, the doorman greets them with "Welcome back Mr. Clemaine (apparently, a portmanteau of Jemaine Clement's first and last names)". This is the first time in the series that we have heard the surname of either of the two main characters.

== Songs ==
This episode features the following songs.

=== "Business Time" ===
In the song "Business Time", Jemaine fantasizes about married life with Sally. The premise of the song is that Wednesday is the night of the week that they "usually make love". After some "foreplay" (brushing their teeth) and a couple of false starts, the objective is completed within two minutes, resulting in an unsatisfied Sally and a "sleepy" Jemaine. The song is performed in a bassy spoken voice interspersed with singing, similar to the style of Barry White. The guitar Bret uses in the song is seen hanging in Dave's shop in other episodes.

=== "Song for Sally" ===
"Song for Sally" is Bret and Jemaine's response to Sally announcing her engagement. In this duet, they each competitively describe their love for her and how each wishes that she'd come back to him. This sequence is shown at 60 frames per second instead of the usual 24.

== Cultural references ==
During Bret's interrogation of Jemaine as to why he is moving out, Bret refers to Jemaine getting a "hickey from Judy Bailey". He is referring to veteran New Zealand news reader Judy Bailey.

In the same conversation, Bret mentions his mould collection. He refers to one mould by name, which he pronounces 'Aspergillius Finigus'. This appears to be a made-up name, although Aspergillus (no 'i') is a real genus of fungus. It is possible he is just mispronouncing the word 'fungus', or the real mould 'Aspergillus fumigatus'.
