= David Costabile =

American actor (born 1967)

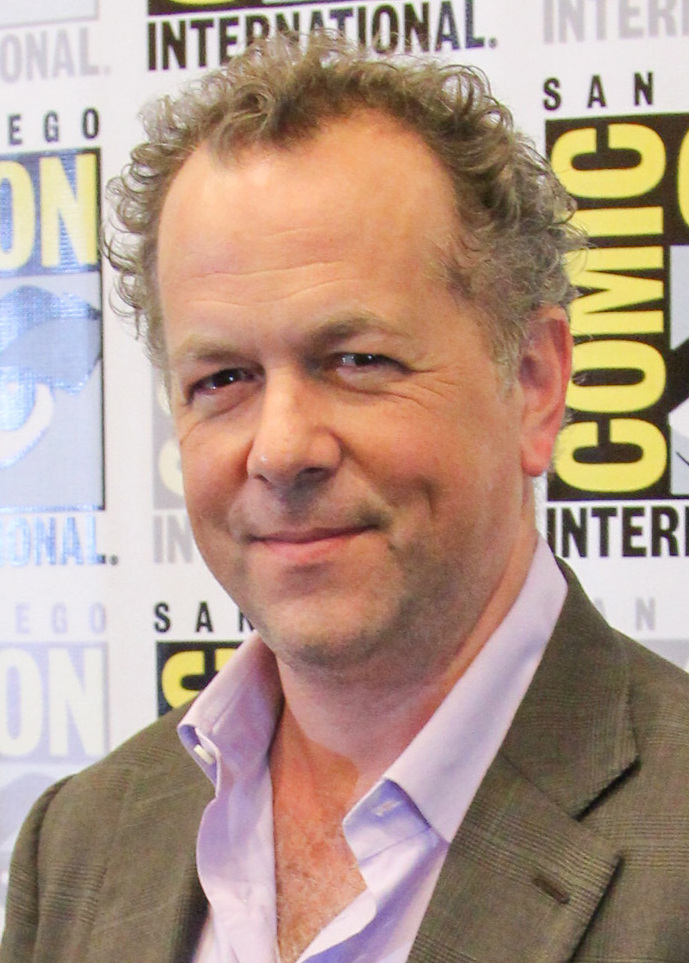
- Costabile in 2014
- Born: January 9, 1967 (age 59); Washington, D.C., U.S.
- Education: Tufts University; New York University (MFA)
- Occupation: Actor
- Years active: 1997–present
- Spouse: Eliza Baldi (m. 2012)
- Children: 2

David Costabile (/ˈkɒstəbəl/; born January 9, 1967) is an American actor. He is best known for his television work, with his roles including Rick Messer in Damages (2007–2010), Doug in Flight of the Conchords (2007–2009), Thomas Klebanow in The Wire (2008), Gale Boetticher in Breaking Bad (2010–2011) and Better Call Saul (2018), Daniel Hardman in Suits (2012–2019) and Suits LA (2025), and Mike "Wags" Wagner in Billions (2016–2023).

He has also acted on film and in Broadway theatre.

== Early life and education ==
Costabile was born in Washington, D.C., and is of Italian descent. Costabile earned his undergraduate degree from Tufts University in 1989 and an MFA from New York University in 1998.

== Career ==
=== Stage ===
Costabile has appeared on Broadway in Manhattan Theatre Club's revival of Translations in 2007, the musical Titanic in 1997, and The Tempest in 1995. In 2005, he appeared as Launce in The Two Gentlemen of Verona as part of the Public Theater's Shakespeare in the Park. For Caroline, or Change, the Drama Desk Award–winning musical by Tony Kushner and Jeanine Tesori (2003–2004), Costabile workshopped and performed in the original production and its Broadway transfer.

=== Television ===
Costabile is best known for his recurring television roles on The Wire (as Thomas Klebanow, managing editor of The Baltimore Sun), Flight of the Conchords (as Doug), Damages (as Detective Rick Messer), Suits (as Daniel Hardman, former senior partner of the law firm of Pearson Hardman), Breaking Bad and Better Call Saul (as Gale Boetticher), and the Showtime production Billions (as Mike "Wags" Wagner).

Costabile also appeared in season six of The Office, as a banker sent from Sabre to evaluate Dunder Mifflin, and in the House episode "Changes" as a limousine driver. During the second series of Franklin & Bash, he guest-starred as a senior partner of the Infeld Daniels New York office, investigating Franklin and Bash because of a complaint filed against them by a former client. He had a minor guest star role in a season 3 episode of The Good Wife, playing the defendant's lawyer in a lawsuit against Lockhart and Gardner, and in a two episode story arc on BBC One's Ripper Street. Costabile also played Mr. Braddock, an attorney to the primary suspect in an episode of The Closer titled "Unknown Trouble", the first episode of season 7.

He has appeared in several television commercials, including ads for Microsoft and FedEx. In 2011, he appeared in Lie to Me as Dr. Mitch Grandon, the head doctor of a psychiatric institution in the Season 3 episode "Funhouse". In 2013, he appeared in Elementary as Danilo Gura, a custodian of a hospital in the Season 1 episode "Lesser Evils". Costabile appeared as Internal Affairs investigator Simon Boyd in the 2013 TV show Low Winter Sun. He appeared in Person of Interest in Season 1 as Samuel Gates. He appeared in The Blacklist in Season 2 as Dr. Linus Creel. He starred in the television series Dig.

In 2025, Costabile reprised his role as Daniel Hardman in an episode of NBC's spinoff series Suits LA. Hardman, a co-founder of the fictional firm Pearson Hardman, previously appeared as a recurring character in Suits seasons 2, 4, 5, and 8, often serving as an antagonist to lead character Harvey Specter.

In an April 2013 article about television, Wired magazine called Costabile "a performer who inhabits his characters so perfectly as to consistently be a fan favorite" and "one of the best things about" every television show in which he has appeared.

=== Film ===
Costabile appeared in 2009's Solitary Man as Gary, the husband of Jenna Fischer's character. He played Jennifer Aniston's attorney in the 2010 film The Bounty Hunter. In 2012, he appeared in the film Lincoln as Republican representative James Ashley. In 2013, he appeared in Steven Soderbergh's film Side Effects as Carl Millbank and as Professor Horstein in Runner Runner. In 2016, he appeared as the Chief in 13 Hours: The Secret Soldiers of Benghazi. In 2019 he appeared in The Dirt as Doc McGhee.

== Personal life ==
In 2012, Costabile married Eliza Baldi in Bucks County, Pennsylvania. They have two children.

== Filmography ==
=== Film ===
Year	Title	Role	Notes
1998	The Siege	Fingerprint Expert	
1999	Cradle Will Rock	Federal Theatre – Beaver Man	
2000	Isn't She Great	Junior editor	
2000	How the Grinch Stole Christmas	Biker Who	
2002	Stolen Summer	Doctor	
2005	Prime	Jason	
2008	Afterschool	Mr. Anderson	
2009	Notorious	Mr. Webber	
2009	Solitary Man	Gary	
2010	The Bounty Hunter	Attorney	
2010	Henry's Crime	Arnold	
2012	Lincoln	James Ashley	
2013	Side Effects	Carl Millbank	
2013	Somewhere Slow	Robert Thompson	
2013	Runner Runner	Professor Horstein	
2016	13 Hours: The Secret Soldiers of Benghazi	The Chief	
2017	The Post	Art Buchwald	
2019	The Dirt	Doc McGhee	
2024	Snack Shack	Judge	
TBA	Hershey †	Tobias Thornhill	Filming

=== Television ===
Year	Title	Role	Notes
2007–2009	Damages	Detective Rick Messer	16 episodes
2007–2009	Flight of the Conchords	Doug	Recurring role
2008	The Wire	Managing Editor Thomas Klebanow	Recurring guest role (season 5)
2010	Law & Order	Glen Dolan	Episode: "Immortal"
2010	The Office	Eric Ward	Episode: "The Banker"
2010–2011	Breaking Bad	Gale Boetticher	7 episodes
2011	Lie to Me	Dr. Mitch Grandon	Episode: "Funhouse"
2011	Law & Order: Special Victims Unit	Bruce Clarkson	Episode: "Bully"
2011	House, M.D.	Phil	Episode: "Changes"
2011	Person of Interest	Samuel Gates	Episode: "Judgment"
2012–2019	Suits	Daniel Hardman	16 episodes
2012	The Good Wife	Zachary Hines	Episode: "Gloves Come Off"
2013	Ripper Street	Daniel Judge	2 episodes
2013	Low Winter Sun	Simon Boyd	10 episodes
2013	Elementary	Danilo Gura	Episode: "Lesser Evils"
2014	The Blacklist	Dr. Linus Creel	Episode: "Dr. Linus Creel"
2015	Dig	Tad Billingham	Main role
2016–2023	Billions	Mike "Wags" Wagner	Main role
2018	Better Call Saul	Gale Boetticher	Episodes: "Something Beautiful" and "Winner"
2018	Murphy Brown	Ed Shannon	Episode: "Three Shirts to the Wind"
2019	Robot Chicken	Itzhak Stern, Gandalf (voice)	Episode: "Garfield Stockman in: A Voice Like Wet Ham"
2020	Soulmates	David	Episode: "The Lovers"
2020	Little Birds	Grant Savage	5 episodes
2020	The Gene: An Intimate History	Narrator	2 episodes
2023	Waco: The Aftermath	Judge Walter Smith	5 episodes
2023	Obliterated	Maddox	4 episodes
2024	Last Week Tonight with John Oliver	Boeing employee	Episode: "Airplanes"
2024	Interview with the Vampire	Leonard Michael	Episode: "And That's The End of It. There's Nothing Else"
2025	Suits LA	Daniel Hardman	Episode: "Bat Signal"
2026	Chicago Med	James Frost	2 episodes
2026	Percy Jackson and the Olympians	Dr. Thorn / Manticore	
