= Frank Wood (actor) =

American actor

- Born: May 6, 1960 (age 66)
- Education: Wesleyan University (BA); New York University (MFA)
- Occupation: Actor
- Years active: 1998–present
- Father: Robert Coldwell Wood
- Relatives: Maggie Hassan (sister)

Frank Wood (born May 6, 1960) is an American actor who has appeared in various television, film, and theatre roles.

== Early life and education ==
Wood is the son of Margaret (Byers) and Robert Coldwell Wood, a political scientist who briefly served as United States secretary of housing and urban development in the Lyndon Johnson administration. His sister is U.S. senator and former governor of New Hampshire, Maggie Hassan. Wood attended the Buxton School. He earned a Bachelor of Arts degree from Wesleyan University in 1984 and a MFA from the New York University Tisch School of the Arts.

== Career ==
Wood won a Tony Award in 1999 for Best Featured Actor in a Play for Side Man. He played Bill in August: Osage County on Broadway. From September 14, 2010, to March 27, 2011, Wood starred as the character Roy Cohn in the acclaimed off-Broadway revival of Tony Kushner’s Pulitzer Prize-winning play Angels in America staged by the Signature Theatre Company in Manhattan. Wood played Gary Lucas in Greetings from Tim Buckley, a film on Tim and Jeff Buckley, which premiered at the 2012 Toronto International Film Festival.

In 2016, Wood played the Night Clerk in Eugene O'Neill's play Hughie opposite Forest Whitaker's Broadway debut at the Booth Theatre in New York City, directed by Michael Grandage.

Wood is on the faculty of HB Studio in New York City.

== Filmography ==
=== Film ===
Year	Title	Role	Notes
2000	Down to You	Doctor	
2000	Small Time Crooks	Oliver	
2000	Pollock	Frank Pollock	
2000	Thirteen Days	McGeorge Bundy	
2001	The Royal Tenenbaums	Hotel Manager	
2002	In America	Paediatrician	
2002	People I Know	Michael Wormly	
2004	Winter Solstice	Bill Brennan	
2004	King of the Corner	Anthony Berenson	
2004	Keane	Assaulted Commuter	
2004	The Undeserved	Alex Montgomery	
2007	Flakes	Bruce	
2007	The Favor	Lawrence	
2007	Michael Clayton	Gerald	
2007	Dan in Real Life	Howard	
2008	Lucky Days	Dr. Ginger	
2008	Changeling	Ben Harris	
2008	Synecdoche, New York	Evaluative Services Doctor	
2009	The Missing Person	Harold Fullmer	
2009	The Taking of Pelham 123	Police Commissioner Sterman	
2012	Greetings from Tim Buckley	Gary Lucas	
2014	St. Vincent	Maggie's Attorney	
2016	The Phenom	Richard Boyer	
2016	Custody	Uncle Frank	
2016	Gold	Scottie Nevins	
2017	Detroit	Robert Edward DeMascio	
2018	Isle of Dogs	Simul-Translate Machine	Voice
2019	Joker	Dr. Benjamin Stoner	
2020	Lapsis	John	
2022	She Said	Matt Purdy	

=== Television ===
Year	Title	Role	Notes
1998	Law & Order	Dr. Rutland	Episode: "Scrambled"
2001	The Sopranos	Dean Ross	Episode: "Second Opinion"
2001	Third Watch	Third Watch	Episode: "Honor"
2002	Law & Order: Criminal Intent	George Weems	Episode: "Chinoiserie"
2004	Medium	Crazed Man	Episode: "Pilot"
2007–2009	Flight of the Conchords	Greg	17 episodes
2010	Bored to Death	Dr. O'Connor	Episode: "Escape from the Castle!"
2011	Lights Out	Dr. Stuart Wexler	Episode: "The Comeback"
2012	Modern Family	Reporter	Episode: "Election Day"
2012	Grey's Anatomy	Frank Wheeler	Episode: "The Girl With No Name"
2012	The Good Wife	Dr. Joseph Lidera	Episode: "And the Law Won"
2012–2021	Law & Order: Special Victims Unit	Dr. Truman / Andrew Lennox	4 episodes
2013	Elementary	EROC Supervisor	Episode: "Snow Angels"
2013	The Newsroom	Shep Pressman	2 episodes
2013	Blue Bloods	Father Markhum	Episode: "Lost and Found"
2014	The Divide	Griffen Donleavey	Episode: "I'm for Justice"
2014–2015	The Knick	Mr. Havershorn	10 episodes
2016	Younger	Dr. Kigner	Episode: "Un-Jaded"
2016	Girls	Charlie's Client	Episode: "The Panic in Central Park"
2016	The Night Of	Medical Examiner	4 episodes
2016–2017	The Get Down	Ed Koch	6 episodes
2018	Mozart in the Jungle	Keith Rutledge	2 episodes
2019	The Blacklist	Gerald Klepper	Episode: "The Ethicist (No. 91)"
2019	Prodigal Son	Dr. Carl Mitchell	Episode: "Fear Response"
2021	Bull	Dr. Edwin Pruitt	Episode: "Cloak and Beaker"
2021	Evil	Brother Jacob	Episode: "S Is for Silence"
2023	The Crowded Room	Dean Martin Hughs	2 episodes

=== Stage ===
Year	Title	Role	Notes
1990	The Last Good Day of Lily Baker	Bob Baker	People's Light and Theatre Company
1998	Side Man	Gene	Criterion Center Stage Right, Broadway
2000	Light Up the Sky	Owen Turner	Williamstown Theatre Festival
2001	Rosencrantz and Guildenstern Are Dead	Rosencrantz	Long Wharf Theatre
2001	The Wax	Christopher	Playwrights Horizons, Off-Broadway
2002	Hollywood Arms	Jody	Cort Theatre, Broadway
2005	Hamlet	Player King	McCarter Theatre
2005	Three Sisters	Vershinin	American Repertory Theater
2005	The Caucasian Chalk Circle	Azdak	South Coast Repertory
2006	The Rainmaker	File	Arena Stage
2006	Spring Awakening	Adult Men	Atlantic Theater Company, Off-Broadway
2007	Spalding Gray: Stories Left to Tell	Family	Minetta Lane Theatre, Off-Broadway
2008	August: Osage County	Bill Fordham (Replacement)	Imperial Theatre, Broadway
2009	Three Sisters	Baron Tuzenbach	Cincinnati Playhouse in the Park
2011	Angels in America	Roy Cohn	Pershing Square Signature Center, Off-Broadway
2011	Born Yesterday	Ed Devery	Cort Theatre, Broadway
2011	King Lear	Duke of Cornwall	The Public Theater, Off-Broadway
2012	Clybourne Park	Russ/Dan	Walter Kerr Theatre, Broadway
2013	A Public Reading of an Unproduced Screenplay About the Death of Walt Disney	Roy Disney	Soho Repertory Theatre, Off-Broadway
2014	Marjorie Prime	Jon	Mark Taper Forum
2015	The Nether	Sims	Lucille Lortel Theatre, Off-Broadway
2016	Signature Plays	Daddy	Pershing Square Signature Center, Off-Broadway
2016	Hughie	Night Clerk	Booth Theatre, Broadway
2016	The Babylon Line	Jack Hassenpflug	Lincoln Center Theater Off-Broadway
2017	Can You Forgive Her?	David	Vineyard Theatre, Off-Broadway
2017	In The Blood	Doctor	Pershing Square Signature Center, Off-Broadway
2017	Tartuffe	Orgon	Huntington Theatre Company
2018	The Iceman Cometh	Cecil Lewis	Bernard B. Jacobs Theatre, Broadway
2018	Network	Nelson Chaney	Belasco Theatre, Broadway
2019	A Human Being, Of A Sort	William Temple Hornaday	Williamstown Theatre Festival
2019	The Great Society	Sen. Everett Dirksen/Deke DeLoach/Colonel Al Lingo/Clark Clifford	Vivian Beaumont Theater, Broadway
2020	The Perplexed	Joseph	Manhattan Theatre Club, Off-Broadway
2023	The Best We Could	Lou	New York City Center, Off-Broadway
2023	Toros	Tica	Second Stage Theater, Off-Broadway
2024	The Meeting: The Interpreter	The Interpreter	Theatre at St. Clements, Off-Broadway
2024	Hold On to Me Darling	Mitch	Lucille Lortel Theatre, Off-Broadway
2026	Indian Princesses	Greg	Atlantic Theater Company, Off-Broadway
