= James Bobin =

British filmmaker

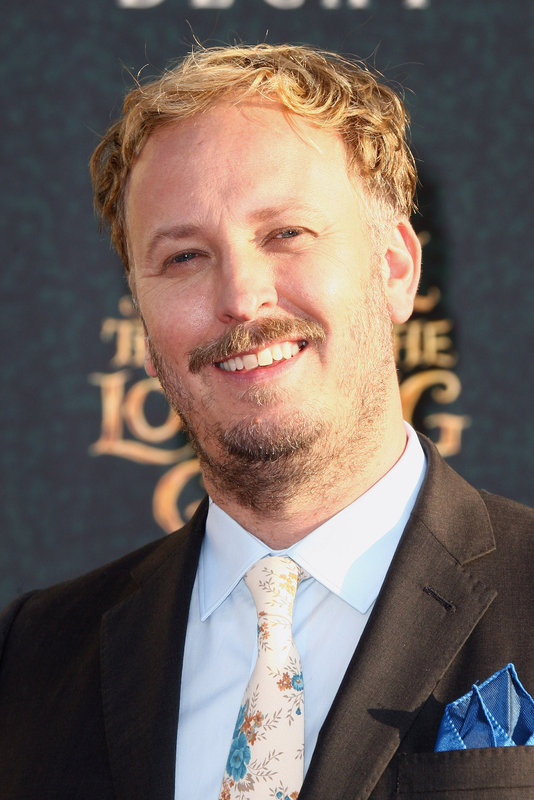
- Bobin in 2016
- Occupations: Film director, screenwriter, producer
- Years active: 1998–present
- Spouse: Francesca Beauman
- Children: 3
- Father: David Bobin
- Family: Joanna Bobin (sister)

James Bobin (born 1 January 1972) is a British filmmaker. He worked as a director and writer on Da Ali G Show and helped create the characters of Ali G, Borat and Brüno. With Bret McKenzie and Jemaine Clement, he co-created Flight of the Conchords. He directed the feature films The Muppets (2011), Muppets Most Wanted (2014), and Alice Through the Looking Glass (2016) from Disney, and Dora and the Lost City of Gold (2019) from Paramount Pictures and Nickelodeon Movies.

== Career ==
Bobin worked as a director and writer on The 11 O'Clock Show and Da Ali G Show, and helped create the characters of Ali G, Borat and Brüno. In 2003 and 2004, he directed and co-wrote all 12 episodes of Ali G in da USAiii for HBO.

With Bret McKenzie and Jemaine Clement, he co-created, wrote and directed Flight of the Conchords, also for HBO. Bobin had previously seen Clement and McKenzie perform and signed on to co-create the show. In 2011, he signed a deal with HBO.

His feature film directorial debut, The Muppets, a musical-comedy film written by Jason Segel and Nicholas Stoller, was released in 2011 and became a critical and commercial hit and won an Oscar for Best Original Song. The film earned him his second BAFTA nomination at the 66th British Academy Film Awards. He wrote (with Nicholas Stoller) and directed a follow-up, Muppets Most Wanted, which was released in 2014. Bobin next directed the sequel Alice Through the Looking Glass (2016). In February 2016, it was announced that he would direct a Jump Street–Men in Black crossover film; however, plans for the movie fell through. In 2011, he signed a first-look deal with HBO.

His most recent film, Dora and the Lost City of Gold, is a live-action adaptation of TV series Dora the Explorer with Isabela Moner as the title character. The film was theatrically released in the United States on 9 August 2019, by Paramount Pictures. In 2020, it was announced that Bobin was in talks to direct a remake of Clue. In October 2021, it was announced that Bobin would direct and executive produce an adaptation of Percy Jackson & the Olympians for Disney+.

== Awards and nominations ==
Bobin received his first BAFTA nomination (British Academy of Film and Television Award) for Best Comedy Series in 2000 for his work on The 11 O'Clock Show. He also won an award from the Royal Television Society, as well as a Silver Rose from the Montreux Television Festival. He won a Writers Guild of America Award in 2007.

Bobin was nominated for Outstanding Writing and Directing Emmys for Da Ali G Show in 2003, and again in 2005. In 2008 and 2009, he was nominated for Outstanding Writing, Directing, and Original Music for Flight of the Conchords, and in 2009, also received an Outstanding Comedy Series nomination for his work as executive producer.

In 2011, Bobin's first feature film, The Muppets, won an Oscar for Best Original Song for the song "Man or Muppet" written by Bret McKenzie. Bobin himself was nominated for the BAFTA Award for Outstanding Debut by a British Writer, Director or Producer.

Year	Award	Category	Work	Result	Ref.
2013	BAFTA Awards	Outstanding Debut by a British Writer, Director or Producer	The Muppets	Nominated	
2020	Imagen Awards	Best Director – Feature Film	Dora and the Lost City of Gold	Won	
2024	Directors Guild of America Awards	Outstanding Directing – Children's Programs	Percy Jackson and the Olympians (for "I Accidentally Vaporize My Pre-Algebra Teacher")	Nominated	
2025	Children's and Family Emmy Awards	Outstanding Directing for a Single Camera Live Action Series	Percy Jackson and the Olympians (for "I Accidentally Vaporize My Pre-Algebra Teacher")	Won (Note: Tied with Alex Ranken for A Real Bug's Life)	

== Reality TV ==
Bobin appeared as himself in one episode of a British documentary series Modern Times. He was one part of a household in search of a flatmate.

== Filmography ==
Short film

- Spyz (2003)

Feature film

- The Muppets (2011)
- Muppets Most Wanted (2014) (Also writer)
- Alice Through the Looking Glass (2016)
- Dora and the Lost City of Gold (2019)

Television

Year	Title	Director	Writer	Producer
1998	The 11 O'Clock Show	Yes	Yes	Associate
2000 (UK); 2003–2004 (US)	Da Ali G Show	Yes	Yes	No
2004	Comedy Lab	Yes	No	Yes
2007–2009	Flight of the Conchords	Yes	Yes	Executive
2011	Enlightened	Yes	No	No
2021	The Mysterious Benedict Society	Yes	No	Executive
2023–present	Percy Jackson and the Olympians	Yes	No	Executive

== Personal life ==
In 2005, Bobin married Francesca Beauman, with whom he has three children. They live in Bath, Somerset.
