= Carthew Neal =

New Zealand television producer

- Occupation: Producer
- Years active: 2007–
- Notable work: Hunt for the Wilderpeople, Tickled, Jojo Rabbit

Carthew Neal is an Academy nominated film, television and interactive producer.

Neal produced Taika Waititi's satire Jojo Rabbit for Fox Searchlight, which received six Academy Award nominations, including Best Picture. He also produced Waititi's adventure comedy film Hunt for the Wilderpeople. It is based on best selling novel Wild Pork & Watercress written by Barry Crump. Hunt for the Wilderpeople premiered at the 2016 Sundance Film Festival. It became New Zealand's number #1 at the box office and sold out to all territories worldwide.

He also produced David Farrier and Dylan Reeve's feature documentary Tickled, which also premiered at the 2016 Sundance Film Festival. It was released by Magnolia and HBO in the US and sold by Magnolia worldwide. Neal executive produced Farrier's Dark Tourist (television series) for Netflix.

He also produced Madeleine Sami and Jackie van Beek's movie The Breaker Upperers which premiered at 2018 South by Southwest. It is distributed by Piki Films and Madman Entertainment in New Zealand and Madman Entertainment in Australia. It screens on Netflix in the rest of the world.

Through Piki Films Carthew executive produced Damon Fepulea'i's Red, White & Brass Aotearoa's #1 local film in 2023, Rachel House (actress)'s The Mountain (2024_film), Josephine Stewart Te Whiu's We Were Dangerous which premiered at SXSW and won the Jury Prize for filmmaking and Curtis Vowell's 2020 film Baby Done starring Rose Matafeo and Matthew Lewis (actor).

He also produced cartoons, Aroha Bridge, written by Coco Solid and executive produced Badjelly based on the Spike Milligan book Badjelly the witch.

Carthew was associate producer on Walt Disney Pictures film Pete's Dragon, working under Barrie M. Osborne.

He produced Tanu Gago's AR project Atua which premiered at Sundance Film Festival and then toured the world's art galleries and interactive documentary FAFSWAGvogue.com with RESN, and Justin Pemberton's interactive documentary Ispydoc.com; a co-production with Canadian digital company Jam3. An early pioneer in interactive web storytelling, he produced and directed pick-a-path comedy 5 Minute Call in 2002 and London Calling in 2003.

Previously he conceived and produced two seasons of THREE's Wa$ted! environmental make-over series, which was remade around the world, including Wa$ted! in America.

He was named Independent Producer of the Year in 2016 at the New Zealand SPADA conference. He was also named in Variety's 2016 Producers to Watch.

== Filmography ==
=== Film ===
Year	Film	Role
2016	Hunt for the Wilderpeople	Producer
2016	Tickled	Producer
2016	Pete’s Dragon	Associate Producer
2018	The Breaker Upperers	Producer
2019	Jojo Rabbit	Producer
2020	Baby Done	Executive Producer
2023	Red, White & Brass	Executive Producer
2024	The Mountain	Executive Producer
2024	We Were Dangerous	Executive Producer
2025	Picking Crew	Executive Producer

=== Television ===
Year	Program	Role
2007	Wasted	Producer/Creator
2009	Super City	Producer
2016	I Spy with my 5 eyes	Producer
2017	Aroha Bridge	Producer
2017	The Tickle King	Producer
2018	Dark Tourist	Executive Producer
2018	Fafswag Vogue	Producer
2022	Atua	Executive Producer
2025	Badjelly	Executive Producer
2026	Small Town Scandal	Executive Producer
