= List of 2024 box office number-one films in New Zealand =

This is a list of films which have placed number one at the box office in New Zealand during 2024.

== Number-one films ==
†	This implies the highest-grossing movie of the year.

#	Weekend end date	Film	Weekend gross	Top 10 openings
1	7 January 2024	Aquaman and the Lost Kingdom	NZ$547,937	Ferrari (#6), Night Swim (#8), The Boys in the Boat (#10)
2	14 January 2024	Wonka	NZ$306,298	The Beekeeper (#2), The Holdovers (#10)
3	21 January 2024	Mean Girls	NZ$318,451	
4	28 January 2024	Fighter	NZ$322,129	The Iron Claw (#9)
5	4 February 2024	Argylle	NZ$334,557	Priscilla (#6)
6	11 February 2024	Argylle	NZ$173,479	Teri Baaton Mein Aisa Uljha Jiya (#2), Force of Nature: The Dry 2 (#3), Pegasus 2 (#10)
7	18 February 2024	Bob Marley: One Love	NZ$574,585	Madame Web (#2), Bramayugam (#9)
8	25 February 2024	Bob Marley: One Love	NZ$427,358	Demon Slayer: Kimetsu no Yaiba – To the Hashira Training (#2), The Zone of Interest (#5), Baghead (#6)
9	3 March 2024	Dune: Part Two	NZ$1,684,930	Manjummel Boys (#3)
10	10 March 2024	Dune: Part Two	NZ$1,100,908	The Great Escaper (#2), YOLO (#4), Shaitaan (#5), Imaginary (#6)
11	17 March 2024	Dune: Part Two	NZ$761,946	The Convert (#2), Exhuma (#4), Yodha (#6)
12	24 March 2024	Dune: Part Two	NZ$439,845	Ghostbusters: Frozen Empire (#2), Wicked Little Letters (#3), Immaculate (#7)
13	31 March 2024	Godzilla x Kong: The New Empire	NZ$1,254,830	Crew (#5), The Mountain (#6), Aadujeevitham (#7)
14	7 April 2024	Godzilla x Kong: The New Empire	NZ$472,412	Kung Fu Panda 4 (#2), Monkey Man (#6), The First Omen (#9), Love Lies Bleeding (#10)
15	14 April 2024	Kung Fu Panda 4	NZ$386,725	Civil War (#3), Bade Miyan Chote Miyan (#6), Aavesham (#9)
16	21 April 2024	Kung Fu Panda 4	NZ$722,582	Challengers (#4), Abigail (#9), Varshangalkku Shesham (#10)
17	28 April 2024	The Fall Guy	NZ$589,879	The Roundup: Punishment (#10)
18	5 May 2024	The Fall Guy	NZ$330,589	Back to Black (#2), Golda (#7)
19	12 May 2024	Kingdom of the Planet of the Apes	NZ$786,415	Shinda Shinda No Papa (#8)
20	19 May 2024	Kingdom of the Planet of the Apes	NZ$527,782	IF (#2), The Way, My Way (#5), The Strangers: Chapter One (#8), Joika (#10)
21	26 May 2024	Furiosa: A Mad Max Saga	NZ$521,933	Twilight of the Warriors: Walled In (#7)
22	2 June 2024	The Garfield Movie	NZ$442,263	Haikyu!! The Dumpster Battle (#6), Unsung Hero (#7), Freud's Last Session (#8), Mr. & Mrs. Mahi (#10)
23	9 June 2024	Bad Boys: Ride or Die	NZ$423,702	
24	16 June 2024	Bad Boys: Ride or Die	NZ$327,187	The Watchers (#5)
25	23 June 2024	Despicable Me 4	NZ$1,406,626	The Road to Patagonia (#7)
26	30 June 2024	Inside Out 2	NZ$2,031,479	A Quiet Place: Day One (#3), Ka Whawhai Tonu (#4), Jatt & Juliet 3 (#5), Kalki 2898 AD (#6), The Taste of Things (#8)
27	7 July 2024	Inside Out 2	NZ$939,524	The Bikeriders (#5)
28	14 July 2024	Inside Out 2	NZ$1,100,000	Twisters (#4)
29	21 July 2024	Inside Out 2	NZ$1,050,813	Longlegs (#4), Bad Newz (#7), Horizon: An American Saga Chapter One (#9)
30	28 July 2024	Deadpool & Wolverine	NZ$2,334.416	
31	4 August 2024	Deadpool & Wolverine	NZ$1,607,130	Trap (#3), Daaru Na Peenda Hove (#6), The Fabulous Four (#8), Successor (#9)
32	11 August 2024	Deadpool & Wolverine	NZ$894,315	It Ends With Us (#2), Borderlands (#4), Bookworm (#5)
33	18 August 2024	It Ends With Us	NZ$700,824	Alien: Romulus (#3), Stree 2 (#4), Coraline: 15th Anniversary (#8), Khel Khel Mein (#10)
34	25 August 2024	It Ends With Us	NZ$398,091	We Were Dangerous (#4), Blink Twice (#6), Un/Happy for You (#10)
35	1 September 2024	Deadpool & Wolverine	NZ$283,497	Andre Rieu's 2024 Maastricht Concert: Power of Love (#2), The Forge (#7)
36	8 September 2024	Beetlejuice Beetlejuice	NZ$697,147	The Greatest of All Time (#4), Thelma (#6)
37	15 September 2024	Beetlejuice Beetlejuice	NZ$467,737	Ardaas Sarbat De Bhalle Di (#5), Ajayante Randam Moshanam A.R.M (#7)
38	22 September 2024	Beetlejuice Beetlejuice	NZ$270,649	The Substance (#3), KishKindha Kaandam (#8)
39	29 September 2024	The Wild Robot	NZ$268,826	Transformers One (#2), Devara Part 1 (#4), Harold and the Purple Crayon (#7), Megalopolis (#10)
40	6 October 2024	The Wild Robot	NZ$565,464	Joker: Folie a Deux (#2), Runt (#6)
41	13 October 2024	The Wild Robot	NZ$501,035	Mittran Da Challeya Truck Ni (#7), Vettaiyan (#8), Vicky Vidya Ka Woh Wala Video (#9), The Apprentice (#10)
42	20 October 2024	Smile 2	NZ$202,823	Shichinin no samurai (#7), Bougainvillea (#9)
43	27 October 2024	Venom: The Last Dance	NZ$696,628	
44	3 November 2024	Venom: The Last Dance	NZ$334,435	Bhool Bhulaiyaa 3 (#2), Singham Again (#3), The Critic (#8), Here (#9), Amaran (#10)
45	10 November 2024	Red One	NZ$302,700	Andrea Bocelli 30: The Celebration (#9)
46	17 November 2024	Gladiator II	NZ$973,192	Hello, Love, Again (#3)
47	24 November 2024	Wicked	NZ$778,000	Goodrich (#4)
48	1 December 2024	Moana 2 †	NZ$3,134,582	Heretic (#4), Sookshma Darshini (#6), Her Story (#8), There’s Still Tomorrow (#9)
49	8 December 2024	Moana 2 †	NZ$1,405,366	Pushpa: The Rule - Part 2 (#3), Andre Rieu’s Christmas Concert: Gold and Silver (#4), The Last Dance (#9), Solo Leveling -ReAwakening (#10)
50	15 December 2024	Moana 2 †	NZ$780,075	Kraven the Hunter (#3), The Lord of the Rings: The War of the Rohirrim (#5), For King + Country: A Drummer Boy Christmas (#9)
51	22 December 2024	Mufasa: The Lion King	NZ$422,181	
52	29 December 2024	Sonic the Hedgehog 3	NZ$794,147	Baby John (#7), A Real Pain (#8), Anora (#9)

== Highest-grossing films ==
Highest-grossing films of 2024
Rank	Title	Distributor	Domestic gross (NZ$)
1	Moana 2	Disney	NZ$10,192,400
2	Inside Out 2	Disney	NZ$9,096,008
3	Deadpool & Wolverine	Disney	NZ$8,577,412
4	Despicable Me 4	Universal	NZ$6,625,290
5	Dune: Part Two	Universal	NZ$6,405,142
6	Wicked	Universal	NZ$6,284,486
7	Mufasa: The Lion King	Disney	NZ$4,542,882
8	Kung Fu Panda 4	Universal	NZ$4,249,365
9	Sonic the Hedgehog 3	Paramount	NZ$4,023,987
10	Godzilla x Kong: The New Empire	Universal	NZ$3,972,423

5 highest-grossing New Zealand films of 2024
Rank	Title	Distributor	Domestic gross
1	Ka Whawhai Tonu	Transmission	NZ$883,997
2	The Mountain	Piki, Madman	NZ$737,618
3	The Convert	Kismet	NZ$573,750
4	We Were Dangerous	Madman	NZ$544,407
5	Bookworm	Rialto	NZ$468,325

== Records ==
5 biggest openings
Rank	Title	Distributor	Opening weekend
1	Moana 2	Disney	NZ$3,134,582
2	Deadpool & Wolverine	Disney	NZ$2,334.416
3	Inside Out 2	Disney	NZ$2,031,479
4	Dune: Part Two	Universal	NZ$1,684,930
5	Despicable Me 4	Universal	NZ$1,406,626

5 best second weekend holds for movies playing in more than 70 theatres
Rank	Title	2nd week hold
1	Wicked Little Letters	-2%
2	Kung Fu Panda 4	-3%
3	Mufasa: The Lion King	-16%
4	The Beekeeper	-20%
5	The Great Escaper	-22%

Worst second weekend hold for movie playing in more than 70 theatres
Rank	Title	2nd week hold
1	Joker: Folie a Deux	-75%

Best per theater opening
Rank	Title	Per theater gross
1	Moana 2	$25,077

== See also ==
- List of New Zealand films – New Zealand films by year
- 2024 in film

Preceded by 2023	2024	Succeeded by 2025
