= List of 2023 box office number-one films in New Zealand =

This is a list of films which placed number one at the box office in New Zealand during 2023.

== Number-one films ==
†	This implies the highest-grossing movie of the year.

#	Weekend end date	Film	Weekend gross	Top 10 openings
1	8 January 2023	Avatar: The Way of Water	NZ$2,274,017	The Fabelmans (#7), Big Trip 2: Special Delivery (#9)
2	15 January 2023	Avatar: The Way of Water	NZ$1,053,084	Operation Fortune (#3), M3GAN (#4), The Amazing Maurice (#7), Varisu (#9)
3	22 January 2023	Avatar: The Way of Water	NZ$636,614	Babylon (#5), Tad, the Lost Explorer and the Emerald Tablet (#9)
4	29 January 2023	Avatar: The Way of Water	NZ$743,281	Pathaan (#2)
5	5 February 2023	Avatar: The Way of Water	NZ$414,113	André Rieu Live in Dublin (#3), Knock at the Cabin (#5), The Whale (#8), BTS: Yet to Come in Cinemas (#9)
6	12 February 2023	Magic Mike's Last Dance	NZ$226,243	Titanic: 25th Anniversary (#3)
7	19 February 2023	Ant-Man and the Wasp: Quantumania	NZ$1,006,331	Women Talking (#10)
8	26 February 2023	Ant-Man and the Wasp: Quantumania	NZ$507,494	Cocaine Bear (#2), Fisherman's Friends: One and All (#6), Missing (#9), Selfiee (#10)
9	5 March 2023	Creed III	NZ309,079	Demon Slayer: Kimetsu no Yaiba – To the Swordsmith Village (#4), Empire of Light (#7)
10	12 March 2023	Creed III	NZ$206,938	Scream VI (#2), 65 (#3) Tu Jhoothi Main Makkaar (#6), Champions (#10)
11	19 March 2023	Shazam! Fury of the Gods	NZ$443,453	Living (#2), Full River Red (#8)
12	26 March 2023	John Wick Chapter 4	NZ$896,018	Red, White & Brass (#2)
13	2 April 2023	John Wick Chapter 4	NZ$609,443	Dungeons & Dragons: Honor Among Thieves (#2)
14	9 April 2023	The Super Mario Bros. Movie	NZ$1,086,328	Air (#4), The Pope's Exorcist (#5)
15	16 April 2023	The Super Mario Bros. Movie	NZ$1,266,755	Mafia Mamma (#8)
16	23 April 2023	The Super Mario Bros. Movie	NZ$1,162,487	Evil Dead Rise (#4), Kisi Ka Bhai Kisi Ki Jaan (#7)
17	30 April 2023	The Super Mario Bros. Movie	NZ$305,134	Ponniyin Selvan: II (#6)
18	7 May 2023	Guardians of the Galaxy Vol. 3	NZ$1,858,729	Jodi (#6)
19	14 May 2023	Guardians of the Galaxy Vol. 3	NZ$1,245,316	Book Club: The Next Chapter (#2), 2018 (#4), Hypnotic (#5), The Kerala Story (#7)
20	21 May 2023	Fast X	NZ$1,685,624	A Good Person (#7)
21	28 May 2023	The Little Mermaid	NZ$867,287	Maybe I Do (#5), Met Opera: Lohengrin (#9), Godday Godday Chaa (#10)
22	4 June 2023	Spider-Man: Across the Spider-Verse	NZ$1,339,432	The Boogeyman (#5), Bank of Dave (#6), Zara Hatke Zara Bachke (#8)
23	11 June 2023	Spider-Man: Across the Spider-Verse	NZ$892,167	The Unlikely Pilgrimage of Harold Fry (#5), The Roundup: No Way Out (#8), Maurh (#9)
24	18 June 2023	The Flash	NZ$707,267	Adipurush (#4), You Hurt My Feelings (#9)
25	25 June 2023	Transformers: Rise of the Beasts	NZ$791,153	Elemental (#3), No Hard Feelings (#5)
26	2 July 2023	Indiana Jones and the Dial of Destiny	NZ$1,012,003	Carry on Jatta 3 (#6), Satyaprem Ki Katha (#9)
27	9 July 2023	Indiana Jones and the Dial of Destiny	NZ$707,688	Insidious 5 (#5), Joy Ride (#8)
28	16 July 2023	Mission: Impossible Dead Reckoning Part One	NZ$1,256,433	Lost in the Stars (#7)
29	23 July 2023	Barbie †	NZ$3,511,506	Oppenheimer (#2)
30	30 July 2023	Barbie †	NZ$2,833,172	Rocky Aur Rani Kii Prem Kahaani (#4), Talk to Me (#5)
31	6 August 2023	Barbie †	NZ$1,690,966	Meg 2: The Trench (#3), The Miracle Club (#5), Never Say Never (#10)
32	13 August 2023	Barbie †	NZ$1,087,587	Gran Turismo: Based on a True Story (#4), Jailer (#5) Gadar 2 (#6), OMG 2 (#9), Asteroid City (#10)
33	20 August 2023	Barbie †	NZ$725,259	Strays (#7)
34	27 August 2023	Sound of Freedom	NZ$436,474	Andre Rieu 2023 Maastricht Concert : Love is All Around (#4), Mastaney (#5), Retribution (#7), Dream Girl 2 (#9), The First Slam Dunk (#10)
35	3 September 2023	The Equalizer 3: The Final Chapter	NZ$382,367	No More Bets (#5), Haunted Mansion (#6), Past Lives (#9)
36	10 September 2023	Jawan	NZ$473,918	The Nun II (#2), My Big Fat Greek Wedding 3 (#5)
37	17 September 2023	The Nun II	NZ$234,518	Blue Beetle (#2), A Haunting in Venice (#3), Teenage Mutant Ninja Turtles: Mutant Mayhem (#4), Creation of the Gods I: Kingdom of Storms (#7)
38	24 September 2023	PAW Patrol: The Mighty Movie	NZ$217,435	Ruby Gillman, Teenage Kraken (#8)
39	1 October 2023	PAW Patrol: The Mighty Movie	NZ$358,445	The Creator (#2), Saw X (#7)
40	8 October 2023	PAW Patrol: The Mighty Movie	NZ$251,487	Uproar (#4), The Exorcist: Believer (#5), Expend4bles (#8)
41	15 October 2023	Taylor Swift: The Eras Tour	NZ$664,957	Kannur Squad (#8), The Royal Edinburgh Military Tattoo (#9)
42	22 October 2023	Taylor Swift: The Eras Tour	NZ$333,680	Killers of the Flower Moon (#2), Leo (#3), Ganapath (#8), Under the Light (#10)
43	29 October 2023	Five Nights at Freddy's	NZ$762,544	Dumb Money (#4), Met Opera: Die Zauberflote (#10)
44	5 November 2023	Five Nights at Freddy's	NZ$322,182	Stop Making Sense: Remastered (#4), Loop Track (#9)
45	12 November 2023	The Marvels	NZ$456,989	Tiger 3 (#4)
46	19 November 2023	The Hunger Games: The Ballad of Songbirds & Snakes	NZ$1,033,683	Saltburn (#6), Thanksgiving (#7)
47	26 November 2023	The Hunger Games: The Ballad of Songbirds & Snakes	NZ$591,602	Napoleon (#2), Freelance (#7), Callas-Paris, 1958 (#9)
48	3 December 2023	The Hunger Games: The Ballad of Songbirds & Snakes	NZ$426,032	Animal (#2), Trolls: Band Together (#4), Andre Rieu's White Christmas (#5), Renaissance: A Film by Beyoncé (#6), Godzilla Minus One (#7), The Old Oak (#10)
49	10 December 2023	Next Goal Wins	NZ$297,721	The Boy and the Heron (#3), 12.12: The Day (#8)
50	17 December 2023	Wonka	NZ$1,032,535	Silent Night (#10)
51	24 December 2023	Wonka	NZ$772,546	Dunki (#2), Salaar: Part 1 – Ceasefire (#6)
52	31 December 2023	Aquaman and the Lost Kingdom	NZ$918,265	One Life (#3), Migration (#4), Wish (#5), Anyone but You (#6)

== Highest-grossing films ==
Highest-grossing films of 2023
Rank	Title	Distributor	Domestic gross (NZ$)
1	Barbie	Universal	NZ$14,489,508
2	Oppenheimer	Universal	NZ$7,073,375
3	The Super Mario Bros. Movie	Universal	NZ$6,984,052
4	Wonka	Universal	NZ$6,653,177
5	Guardians of the Galaxy Vol. 3	Disney	NZ$6,282,249
6	Spider-Man: Across the Spider-Verse	Sony Pictures	NZ$5,774,108
7	Mission: Impossible Dead Reckoning Part One	Paramount	NZ$4,353,178
8	Fast X	Universal	NZ$3,976,633
9	Aquaman and the lost kingdom	Universal	NZ$3,885,305
10	The Hunger Games: The Ballad of Songbirds & Snakes	Roadshow films	NZ$3,829,297

5 highest-grossing New Zealand films of 2023
Rank	Title	Distributor	Domestic gross
1	Red, White & Brass	Piki, Miss Conception	NZ$1,463,740
2	Uproar	Kismet	NZ$795,244
3	Stylebender	Ahi, Mister Smith, William Morris Endeavor	NZ$115,554
4	Loop Track	Vendetta	NZ$72,576
5	Bad Behaviour	Ahi	NZ$57,741

== Records ==
5 biggest openings
Rank	Title	Distributor	Opening weekend
1	Barbie	Universal	NZ$3,512,855
2	Guardians of the Galaxy Vol. 3	Disney	NZ$1,858,729
3	Fast X	Universal	NZ$1,685,624
4	Oppenheimer	Universal	NZ$1,372,350
5	Spider-Man: Across the Spider-Verse	Sony Pictures	NZ$1,339,432

5 best second weekend holds for movies playing in more than 70 theatres
Rank	Title	2nd week hold
1	Ruby Gillman. Teenage Kraken	153%
2	Tad, the Lost Explorer and the Emerald Tablet	72%
3	PAW Patrol: The Mighty Movie	65%
4	Babylon	15%

Worst second weekend hold for movie playing in more than 70 theatres
Rank	Title	2nd week hold
1	André Rieu Live in Dublin	-95%

Best per theater opening
Rank	Title	Per theater gross
1	Barbie	$30,272

== See also ==
- List of New Zealand films – New Zealand films by year
- 2023 in film

Preceded by 2022	2023	Succeeded by 2024
