= Wa$ted! =

Wa$ted! may refer to:

- Wa$ted! (New Zealand TV series), the original New Zealand version
- Wa$ted! (U.S. TV series), the US version
