= The Mountain (2024 film) =

New Zealand comedy drama film by Rachel House

- Theatrical release poster
- Directed by: Rachel House
- Screenplay by: Rachel House; Tom Furniss
- Based on: Story by Tom Furniss
- Produced by: Desray Armstrong; Morgan Waru
- Starring: Elizabeth Atkinson; Reuben Francis; Terence Daniel; Fern Sutherland; Byron Coll; Troy Kingi; Sukena Shah
- Cinematography: Matt Henley
- Edited by: Cushla Dillon; Carly Turner
- Music by: Troy Kingi; Arli Liberman
- Production companies: Piki Films; Sandy Lane Productions
- Distributed by: Madman Entertainment Hope Runs High
- Release dates: 19 March 2024 (TSB Showplace); 28 March 2024 (New Zealand); April 24, 2026 (US)
- Running time: 90 minutes
- Country: New Zealand
- Language: English
- Box office: $569,961

The Mountain is a New Zealand coming-of-age comedy drama film directed by Rachel House, who co-wrote the screenplay with Tom Furniss, based on a story by Furniss. The film is about a young girl named Sam seeking to reconnect with her Māori culture with the help of her friends Mallory and Bronco, while hoping this will cure her cancer.

The Mountain had its premiere at the TSB Showplace in New Plymouth on 19 March 2024 and was released in New Zealand by Madman Entertainment on 28 March, and by Hope Runs High on April 24, 2026 in the US.

== Plot summary ==
The film focuses on three eleven year-old children in New Plymouth. Sam is mixed-Māori and European New Zealander/Pakeha girl undergoing chemotherapy at a hospital. She and her Pakeha mother Wendy have no contact with her Māori birth father. Mallory is a Pakeha boy whose father Hugh is grieving the loss of his mother. Bronco is a Māori boy who moved with his father Tux to New Plymouth. Tux works long hours as a Police constable.

Seeking to climb Mount Taranaki, Sam escapes the hospital with the connivance of fellow patient Peachy. She enlists the help of Mallory in obtaining supplies and serving as her guide. The two are subsequently joined by Bronco, who helps Sam to reconnect with her Māori culture. The three children take an unofficial route to Mount Taranaki which involves navigating through a golf course, farmland, and a rickety rope bridge. While crossing the bridge, Mallory falls into the river but is saved by Bronco. Bronco later uses his bush skills to build a camp fire and tells his friends about a Māori legend about the origins of Mount Taranaki.

Meanwhile, the adults along with Peachy separately search for the three children, taking an official route. After Hugh receives a social media image of the children by a campfire, they realise that the three missing children are travelling together. The following morning, Mallory has a falling out with Sam after learning that she lied about her parents being dead. Bronco convinces Mallory to reconcile with Sam. The two help Sam after she injures her leg.

As they approach Mount Taranaki, the adults and Peachy close in on them. Having issues with their parents, the children persevere and create an improvised obstacle using Bronco's bike and their travel packs. Continuing their quest, they encounter a fog. The trio also visit a cave with glowworms. Sam gets weaker due to her cancer condition. After getting lost walking in circles, Mallory and Bronco convince Sam that Mount Taranaki is trying to tell her that she does not need to climb to the summit in her weakened condition. After deciding to return to their parents, the fog mysteriously lifts.

Following their adventure on Mount Taranaki, the three kids and their families become close friends. Mallory and Bronco have ambitions of climbing Mount Taranaki again.

== Cast ==
- Elizabeth Atkinson as Sam
- Reuben Francis as Mallory
- Terence Daniel as Bronco
- Troy Kingi as Tux
- Byron Coll as Hugh
- Fern Sutherland as Wendy
- Sukena Shah as Peachy

== Production ==
=== Development and writing ===
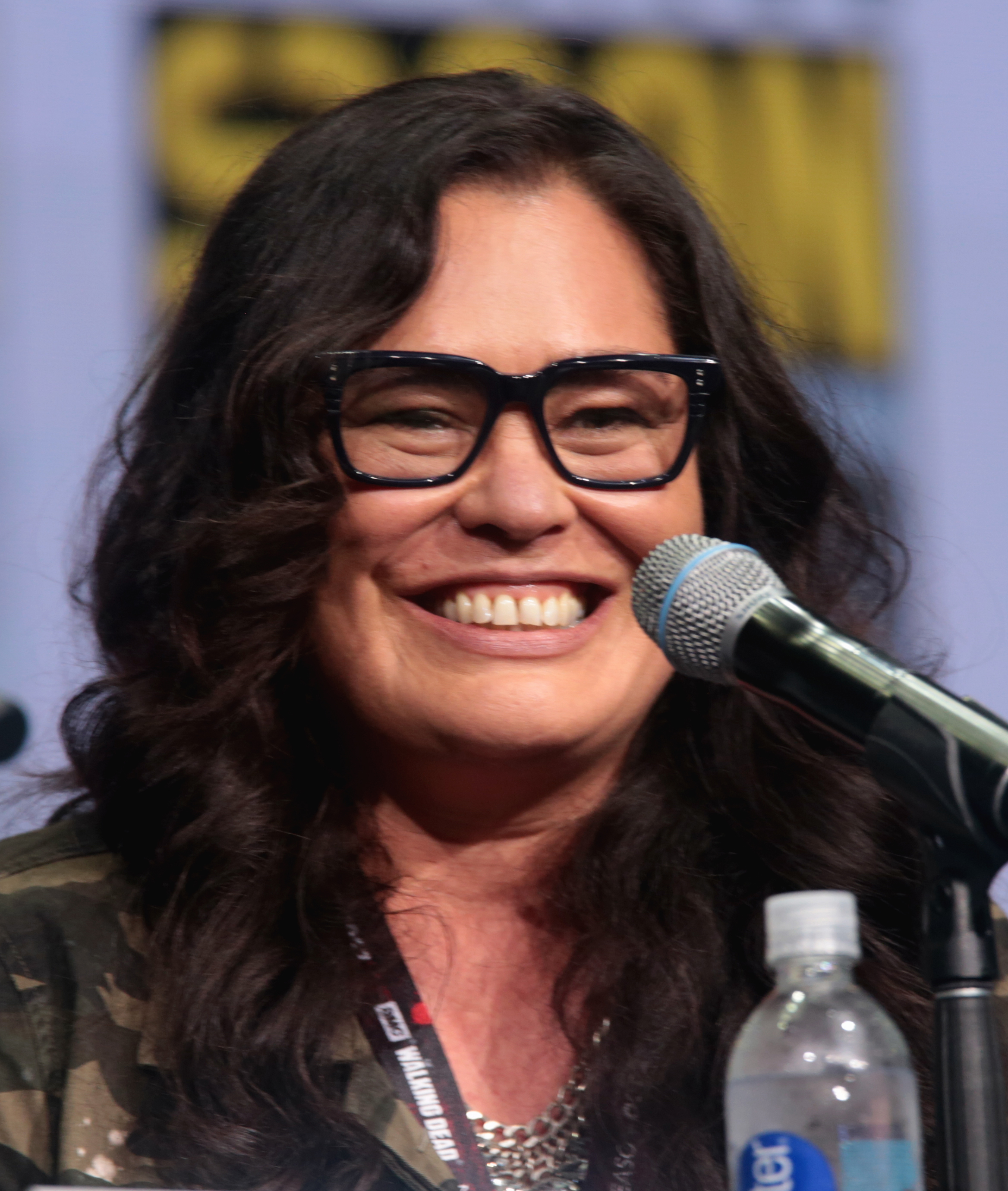
Rachel House (pictured) directed The Mountain and co-wrote the script with Tom Furniss

The Mountain's script was co-written by Tom Furniss and Rachel House. The film also marked House's directorial debut. Furniss' original script centred around three Pakeha/European New Zealander boys climbing the mountain. House, who is Māori, revised the script to incorporate Māori characters, culture and stories. While Mallory remained Pakeha, Sam and Bronco were revised as Māori, with Sam becoming a girl. House also introduced the idea of having Sam reconnect with her Māori cultural heritage in the story.

While Furniss' script did not name the mountain, House chose Mount Taranaki as the film setting, saying that she "thought it was a wonderful opportunity to try and explain how we feel about our maunga (mountains)." House explained that mountains were significant to Māori culture, describing them as "ancient living ancestors who have shaped and formed our identity, belonging and connection to each other." Mount Taranaki and the surrounding peaks are considered ancestors by eight local Māori tribes. The mountain and its surrounding peaks were granted legal personhood in 2023 under the name Te Kāhui Tupua by the New Zealand Government as redress for their confiscation in 1866.

=== Casting ===
The film featured the acting debuts of three child actors: Elizabeth Atkinson (Sam), Reuben Francis (Mallory) and Terence Daniel (Bronco). House made the deliberate decision to cast 11 year old actors, stating during an interview with The Spinoff that it was the age "just before they were about to kind of move into being rangatahi (teenagers) while they still have their ability to believe in magic, for want of a better word." House and several cast and crew members including Francis and Atkinson came from the Taranaki region; with House and Atkinson coming from the Ngāti Mutunga and Te Atiawa tribes.

Supporting cast members included Troy Kingi, Byron Coll, Sukena Shah and Fern Sutherland.

=== Filming ===
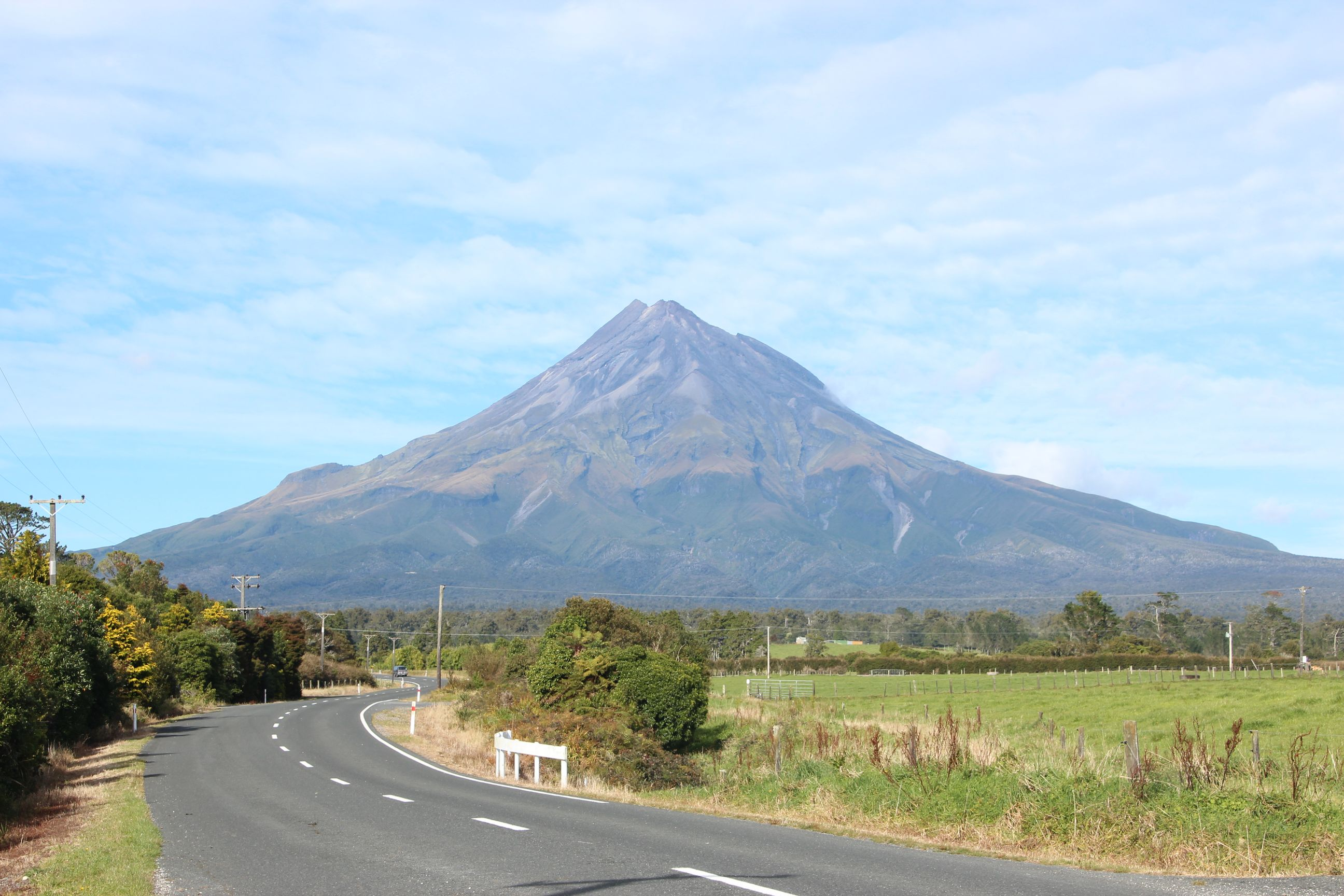
The film was shot on location on Mount Taranaki in April and May 2023

Filming took place on location at Mount Taranaki with support from the local Māori iwi (tribe) Taranaki Whānui. The film was produced by Piki Films and Sandy Lane Productions. Desray Armstrong and Morgan Waru served as producers while Carthew Neal, Taika Waititi and Paul Wiegard served as executive producers. Filming lasted four weeks and concluded in mid-May 2023.

The Mountain received funding from several entities including the New Zealand Film Commission, the New Zealand Government's Screen Production Grant, NZ On Air, Whakaata Māori, the Department of Post, Native Audio, Nude Run, Hillfarrance and Kiwibank.

=== Post-production ===
Due to the clear conditions during filming, Wētā FX digitally inserted clouds into the film footage during post-production. Troy Kingi and Arli Liberman composed the film's soundtrack.

== Release ==
A full-length trailer of The Mountain was released on 8 February 2024. The film was also promoted by Taranaki's regional development agency Te Puna Umanga Venture Taranaki and the Taranaki Regional Film Office.

The Mountain held its international premiere at New Plymouth's TSB Showplace on 19 March 2024. 800 people attended the premiere including local iwi Ngā Iwi o Taranaki, Ngāti Te Whiti, and Te Atiawa. Several cast and crew members including Rachel House, Terence Daniel, Elizabeth Atkinson, Reuben Francis, Troy Kingi, Sukena Shah and Desray Armstrong also attended the premiere.

It was subsequently released in the rest of New Zealand on 28 March. Piki Films and Madman Entertainment handled the film's distribution in New Zealand and abroad respectively.

The film played at the Sydney Film Festival and will screen at Toronto International Film Festival in September 2024.

In late 2025 it was announced that Hope Runs High had acquired the film for US distribution. IndieWire premiered a new trailer ahead of the US theatrical release on April 24, 2026.

== Critical reception ==
Liam Maguren of Flicks gave a positive review, praising Rachel House for "crafting a distinctly New Zealand film centred on kids that young audiences can latch onto while also telling a story with enough substance to affect anyone of any age." He also praised the performances of Elizabeth Atkinson, Reuben Francis, Terence Daniel, Sukena Shah, Fern Sutherland, Byron Coll and Troy Kingi. Maguren was critical of the lack of danger and stakes in a film marketed as an adventure film. He praised Matt Henley's cinematography for capturing the scenic beauty of Mount Taranaki.

Carol J. Paewai of Hawke's Bay Today gave a positive review, describing The Mountain as "a funny, moving and thought-provoking New Zealand film that showcases up-and-coming actors." She also praised the film for highlighting the relationship between Māori people and the natural world using a coming-of-age story format.

Milli Banbury of "Kiwi Kids News" gave a positive review, describing the movie as a "cinematic marvel, of a human connection and ancestral reverence." She praised House for weaving various themes and topics including humour, New Zealand culture, heartfelt emotions and te ao Māori (Māori worldview). Banbury described each of the three protagonists grappling with personal "mountains" of their own including Sam's cancer, Mallory's grief from losing his mother and Bronco dealing with his busy father. Banbury also praised the movie's cinematography and panoramic photography of Mount Taranaki.

In The Film Stage, Jared Mobarek praised the film's ability to balance adventure, comedy, & mortality without "talking down" to a young audience.

Monica Castillo compared the film to "Stand By Me (but with a lot more deadpan humor)," while celebrating its acknowledgement of multiethnic identities for Paste (magazine)
