= Killer Sofa =

- Japanese film poster
- Directed by: Bernie Rao
- Written by: Bernie Rao
- Produced by: Bernie Rao
- Cinematography: Bernie Rao
- Edited by: Bernie Rao
- Music by: James Dunlop
- Production company: Mad Kiwi Films
- Distributed by: High Octane Pictures
- Release date: 1 October 2019
- Running time: 81 minutes
- Country: New Zealand
- Language: English
- Budget: $85,000

Killer Sofa is a 2019 New Zealand low-budget direct-to-DVD comedy horror film written and directed by Bernie Rao. Starring Piimio Mei, Nathalie Morris, Harley Neville, Stacey King, Jed Brophy, Jim Baltaxe, and Grant Kereama, the film follows a living recliner that commits crimes in the name of passion for its new owner. The film was released on DVD by American distributor High Octane Pictures on 1 October 2019 and received mixed reviews from critics, though its humour was generally positively received.

== Plot ==
Frederico Olsen performs a voodoo ritual in front of a recliner, while Warren Lee cuts off his legs. A short time later his dismembered foot is found, and police inspectors Bob Gravy and Roseanne Grape, interview Francesca, his ex-girlfriend, and her friend, Maxi. Meanwhile the cursed recliner is accidentally sent to Maxi's grandfather, Jack, a disgraced Rabbi. He touches it, and experiences a psychic vision about its past. He believes the chair is possessed by a Dybbuk, a kind of evil spirit. Eventually the recliner ends up outside Francesca's apartment, and with the help of her boyfriend TJ she brings it inside.

Jack does research on Dybbuks, watching Youtube videos by a psychic called Tohunga Makutu. Francesca has a strange dream about the chair, and in the morning discovers a breakfast made by the chair; she assumes TJ is responsible, although he is confused. Gravy and Grape discover a large number of objects related to voodoo at Frederico's apartment, and bring Francesca in for another interview. TJ is then stabbed in the leg by the recliner, although he survives. He plans to recover at his mom's house, a few houses down the street, but during the night is attacked by the recliner again, this time fatally.

The police now believes there is a serial killer targeting Francesca's ex-boyfriends. Their prime suspect is Ralph, Maxi's cousin. However he breaks into Francesca's apartment, to install cameras and is killed by the recliner while masturbating with her bra and hat on her bed. Jack has discovered more about the history of the chair, and warns Maxi about it, although she ignores it and returns to Francesca's apartment. She sees the chair disposing Ralph's body, and a mini chase occurs, with she being forced to jump from the window, landing unconscious in a dumpster.

Francesca and the two police officers go back to her apartment to look for Maxi, and they discover Ralph's corpse. The recliner calls Francesca "Valerie". This causes her to flee. She contemplates suicide at the edge of a cliff, then Jack calls her and she returns to the city. It's revealed that in the 1800s a pair of witches named Valerie and Gerard Collette lived in Akaroa, and poisoned many people to steal their souls. When the town discovered this they formed a mob. They burnt Gerard alive, but Valerie killed herself, transferring her spirit into a nearby woman, Francesca's great grandmother. That spirit has passed through the generations, and lives on in Francesca, as does Gerard's in the recliner.

Jack plans to build two dybbuk boxes to contain the spirits, then burn them. He suffers a heart attack however, and Francesca decides to confront the recliner without him. She does it with gasoline, but before she can burn it, the police arrive and reveal that Frederico's body was inside it the entire time, and that's what Gerard's soul had attached to. They believe that by shooting the chair they've dispelled the spirit.

A short time later Francesca has Gravy head over to her apartment, where she poisons him before transferring Gerard's soul from the recliner into his, as Valerie has completely taken over her body. The two murder Grape, and leave, although Maxi saw what happened.

== Cast ==
- Piimio Mei as Francesca
- Nathalie Morris as Maxi
- Jim Baltaxe as Jack
- Jed Brophy as Inspector Bob Gravy
- Stacey King as Inspector Roseanne Grape
- Angelica Thomas as Ashanti
- James Cain as Ralph Kilkelly
- Jordan River as TJ
- Harley Neville as Frederico
- Sarah Munn as Valerie
- Sean Fleming as Warren Lee
- Trae Te Wiki as Marie St Claire
- Grant Kereama as Tohunga Makutu

== Production ==
The recliner cost $100. The initial title of the film was planned to be My Lover, My Lazy Boy, but the production feared being sued by the La-Z-Boy furniture company. After this, the title The Furnishing was then considered, but finally the name Killer Sofa was chosen. Rao faced some limitations while filming as he only had one recliner, which meant he was unable to film the sofa jumping from a window and crushing a person on a car, or a scene of the sofa vomiting blood as he worried it would stain the suede on the recliner.

== Release ==
The film was released on DVD on 1 October 2019 by the US-based distributor High Octane Pictures, before arriving to video-on-demand.

== Reception ==
The film received mixed reviews from critics, but reception for its humour was overall positive.

Flickering Myth reviewer Matt Donato gave the film 3/4 stars and said that it is "weird, sometimes unwieldy, but should delight those who giggled incessantly at the film's properly conveyed trailer". In a less positive review, Mike Phalin of Sciencefiction.com gave the film a 2.5/5 stars and said, "For a quick bit of wacky horror with a twist ending, Killer Sofa delivers on that end. Had the story and some key characters gotten a bit of tidying up in the script process, this could have been much more fun."

== See also ==
- Death Bed: The Bed That Eats
- The Refrigerator
- Amityville 4: The Evil Escapes, featuring a killer lamp
- Amityville: It's About Time, featuring a killer clock
- Cinema of New Zealand
