= List of 2025 box office number-one films in New Zealand =

This is a list of films which have placed number one at the box office in New Zealand during 2025.

== Number-one films ==
#	Weekend end date	Film	Weekend gross	Top 10 openings
1	5 January 2025	Sonic the Hedgehog 3	NZ$559,776	Paddington in Peru (#2), Nosferatu (#5)
2	12 January 2025	Sonic the Hedgehog 3	NZ$311,906	Conclave (#4), Den of Thieves 2: Pantera (#8), Game Changer (#10)
3	19 January 2025	Sonic the Hedgehog 3	NZ$231,029	Wolf Man (#8), Rekhachithram (#10)
4	26 January 2025	A Complete Unknown	NZ$338,969	We Live in Time (#3), Flight Risk (#8), Sky Force (#10)
5	2 February 2025	A Complete Unknown	NZ$248,109	Creation of the Gods II: Demon Force (#7), Babygirl (#8), Companion (#9)
6	9 February 2025	A Complete Unknown	NZ$194,444	Widow Clicquot (#3), Becoming Led Zeppelin (#7)
7	16 February 2025	Captain America: Brave New World	NZ$734,823	Bridget Jones: Mad About Boy (#2), Ne Zha 2 (#3), Chhaava (#5), Heart Eyes (#6)
8	23 February 2025	Bridget Jones: Mad About the Boy	NZ$487,758	The Monkey (#4), I'm Still Here (#7)
9	2 March 2025	Tinā	NZ$653,271	Officer on Duty (#8)
10	9 March 2025	Tinā	NZ$658,355	Mickey 17 (#2), The Last Journey (#8)
11	16 March 2025	Tinā	NZ$588,858	Black Bag (#3), National Treasure Live: The Importance of Being Ernest (#9)
12	23 March 2025	Tinā	NZ$470,927	Snow White (#2), The Last Showgirl (#7), The Rule of Jenny Pen (#8)
13	30 March 2025	Tinā	NZ$378,944	L2: Empuraan (#2), A Working Man (#3), Sikandar (#7), Bonhoeffer: Pastor. Spy. Assassin. (#9)
14	6 April 2025	A Minecraft Movie	NZ$2,522,477	Novocaine - No Pain (#5), Queer (#10)
15	13 April 2025	A Minecraft Movie	NZ$1,444,043	Andre Rieu's 75th Birthday Celebration: The Dream Continues (#2), The Amateur (#3), The Chosen: The Last Supper - Part One (#5), Dog Man (#6), Death of a Unicorn (#8), Jaat (#9)
16	20 April 2025	A Minecraft Movie	NZ$1,484,660	Sinners (#5), Warfare (#6), The Penguin Lessons (#7), Drop (#9)
17	27 April 2025	A Minecraft Movie	NZ$947,145	The Accountant 2 (#2), Until Dawn (#7), Small Things Like This (#8)
18	4 May 2025	Thunderbolts*	NZ$748,788	Raid 2 (#6), Guru Nanak Jahaz (#9), Marlon Williams: Ngā Ao E Rua — Two Worlds (#10)
19	11 May 2025	Thunderbolts*	NZ$472,702	Final Destination: Bloodlines (#5), Ocean with David Attenborough (#6), Clown in a Cornfield (#7)
20	18 May 2025	Final Destination: Bloodlines	NZ$311,977	The Salt Path (#3)
21	25 May 2025	Lilo & Stitch	NZ$1,373,564	Mission Impossible- The Final Reckoning (#2)
22	2nd June 2025	Lilo & Stitch	NZ$1,061,393	The Phoenician Scheme (#5), Bring Her Back (#6), Saunkan Saunkanay 2 (#9)
23	9th June 2025	Lilo & Stitch	NZ$540,773	Housefull 5 (#3), Ballerina (#4), Thug Life
24	15th June 2025	How to Train your Dragon	NZ$1,122,683	Materialists (#3)
25	22nd June 2025	How to Train your Dragon	NZ$910,702	28 Years Later (#2), Elio (#5), Sitaare Zameen Par (#7), Jane Austen Wrecked My Life (#10)
26	29th June 2025	F1	NZ$1,254,538	M3GAN 2.0 (#8), Sardaar Ji 3 (#9)
27	6th July 2025	Jurassic World: Rebirth	NZ$1,658,708	Le Comte de Monte-Cristo (#10)
28	13th July 2025	Superman	NZ$1,329,790	The Smurfs Movie (#5)
29	20th July 2025	Superman	NZ$667,172	I Know What you did Last Summer (#5), Saiyaara (#7), Sarbala Ji (#10)
30	27th July 2025	The Fantastic Four: First Steps	NZ$906,827	Four Letters of Love (#6), The Lychee Road (#10)
31	3rd August 2025	The Fantastic Four: First Steps	NZ$499,337	Chal Mera Putt 4 (#5)
32	10th August 2025	Weapons	NZ$367,143	Freakier Friday (#3), Dead to Rights (#7), Mahavatar Narsimha (#9)
33	17th August 2025	Weapons	NZ$265,959	War 2 (#2), Coolie (#4), Nobody 2 (#6), Mr. Burton (#7)
34	24th August 2025	The Naked Gun	NZ$253,211	
35	31st August 2025	André Rieu’s 2025 Maastricht Concert: Waltz the Night Away!	NZ$227,798	Caught Stealing (#5), Param Sundari (#9), Hridayapoorvam (#10)
36	7th September 2025	The Conjuring: Last Rites	NZ$833,302	The Roses (#2), Baaghi 4 (#6)
37	14th September 2025	Demon Slayer -Kimetsu no Yaiba- The Movie: Infinity Castle	NZ$767,062	Downton Abbey: The Grand Finale (#2), The Long Walk (#5), Mirai no Mirai (#7), Sketch (#10)
38	21st September 2025	Downton Abbey: The Grand Finale	NZ$337,799	The Bad Guys 2 (#4), A Big Bold Beautiful Journey (#6), Jolly LLB 3 (#7), Evil Unbound 731 (#9)
39	28th September 2025	The Bad Guys 2	NZ$455,941	One Battle After Another (#2), Prime Minister (#6)
40	5th October 2025	The Bad Guys 2	NZ$494,984	Taylor Swift | The Official Release Party of a Showgirl (#2), The Smashing Machine (#9)
41	12th October 2025	Tron: Ares	NZ$321,456	Eleanor the Great (#9)
42	19th October 2025	Tron: Ares	NZ$133,836	The Black Phone 2 (#2), Roofman (#3)
43	26th October 2025	Regretting You	NZ$213,846	Deliver Me From Nowhere (#2), Chainsaw Man — The Movie: Reze Arc (#3), Pike River (#4), Thamma (#8)
44	2nd November 2025	Pike River	NZ$253,233	Bugonia (#5), A Paw Patrol Christmas (#6), Good Fortune (#7), Diés Iraé (#9)
45	9th November 2025	Predator: Badlands	NZ$353,250	
46	16th November 2025	Now You See Me: Now You Don’t	NZ$309,390	The Running Man (#3), De De Pyaar De 2 (#5), Hamilton (#6)
47	23rd November 2025	Wicked: For Good	NZ$1,348,709	Mastiii 4 (#7)
48	30th November 2025	Zootopia 2	NZ$849,048	Dead of Winter (#5), Tere Ishk Mein (#7), Ekō (#9), Die, My Love (#10)
49	7th December 2025	Zootopia 2	NZ$548,657	Five Nights at Freddy’s 2 (#2), André Rieu’s 2025 Christmas Concert: Merry Christmas (#4), Nuremberg (#5), Dhurandhar (#6), Jujutsu Kaisen: Execution (#7), Eternity (#9)
50	14th December 2025	Zootopia 2	NZ$426,366	Kis Kisko Pyaar Karoon 2 (#9), Ella McCay (#10)
51	21st December 2025	Avatar: Fire and Ash	NZ$2,400,924	Bha Bha Ba (#7), The History of Sound (#10)
52	28th December 2025	Avatar: Fire and Ash	NZ$1,464,568	The Housemaid (#2), Anaconda (#3), The SpongeBob Movie: Search for Squarepants (#5), Not Only Fred Dagg but Also John Clarke (#9), Tu Meri Main Tera Main Tera Tu Meri (#10)

== Highest-grossing films ==
Highest-grossing films of 2025
Rank	Title	Distributor	Domestic gross (NZ$)
1	Avatar: Fire and Ash	Walt Disney	NZ$11,478,904
2	A Minecraft Movie	Universal	NZ$10,009,672
3	Tinā	Madman	NZ$6,486,918
4	Zootopia 2	Walt Disney	NZ$6,130,489
5	Lilo & Stitch	Walt Disney	NZ$5,499,081
6	How to Train your Dragon	Universal	NZ$5,212,869
7	F1		NZ$4,968,219
8	Jurassic World: Rebirth	Universal	NZ$4,646,738
9	Mission Impossible- The Final Reckoning	Paramount Pictures	NZ$4,513,262
10	Wicked: For Good	Universal	NZ$3,985,336

5 highest-grossing New Zealand films of 2025
Rank	Title	Distributor	Domestic gross
1	Tinā	Madman	NZ$6,486,864
3	Pike River		NZ$1,441,833
3	Prime Minister		NZ$1,092,814
4	Marlon Williams: Ngā Ao E Rua — Two Worlds	Madman	NZ$211,445
5	The Haka Party Incident	Vendetta	NZ$111,838

== Records ==
5 biggest openings
Rank	Title	Distributor	Opening weekend
1	A Minecraft Movie	Universal	NZ$2,522,477
2	Avatar: Fire and Ash	Walt Disney	NZ$2,400,924
3	Jurassic World: Rebirth	Universal	NZ$1,658,708
4	Lilo & Stitch	Walt Disney	NZ$1,373,564
5	Wicked: For Good	Universal	NZ$1,348,709

5 best second weekend holds for movies playing in more than 70 theatres
Rank	Title	2nd week hold
1	Kangaroo	162%
2	The Bad Guys 2	128%
3	Pike River	92%
4	Prime Minister	27%

Worst second weekend hold for movie playing in more than 65 theatres
Rank	Title	2nd week hold
1	Demon Slayer -Kimetsu no Yaiba- The Movie: Infinity Castle	-72%

Best per theater opening
Rank	Title	Per theater gross
1	A Minecraft Movie	NZ$22,932

== See also ==
- List of New Zealand films – New Zealand films by year
- 2024 in film

Preceded by 2024	Box office number-one films 2025	Succeeded by 2026
