= List of 2026 box office number-one films in New Zealand =

This is a list of films which have placed number one at the box office in New Zealand during 2026.

== Number-one films ==
#	Weekend end date	Film	Weekend gross	Top 10 openings
1	4 January 2026	Avatar: Fire and Ash	NZ$1,187,152	Song Sung Blue (#2)
2	11 January 2026	Avatar: Fire and Ash	NZ$667,482	The RajaSaab (#7)
3	18 January 2026	Avatar: Fire and Ash	NZ$587,592	Hamnet (#4), 28 Years Later: The Bone Temple (#7), David (#9)
4	25 January 2026	Marty Supreme	NZ$512,329	Border 2 (#4), Mercy (#9)
5	1 February 2026	Iron Lung	NZ$193,902	Send Help (#4), The Choral (#6)
6	8 February 2026	Shelter	NZ$174,456	
7	15 February 2026	Wuthering Heights	NZ$689,572	Crime 101 (#2), Mārama (#7)
8	22 February 2026	Wuthering Heights	NZ$433,546	GOAT (#2), Fackham Hall (#3), Blades of the Guardians (#5), The King’s Warden (#8), No Other Choice (#10)
9	1 March 2026	Wuthering Heights	NZ$262,748	Scream 7 (#2), Pegasus 3 (#6), Holy days (#7), Night King (#10)
10	8 March 2026	Wuthering Heights	NZ$155,208	Tenor: My Name is Pati (#4), The Bride (#8), The Kng's Warden (#10)
11	15 March 2026	Reminders of Him	NZ$204,777	Cold Storage (#9)
12	22 March 2026	Project Hail Mary	NZ$793,636	Dhurandhar 2 (#2), Ready or Not 2: Here I Come (#5), Aadu 3 (#6)
13	29 March 2026	Project Hail Mary	NZ$865,715	Hoppers (#2), The Magic Faraway Tree (#4), I Swear (#7),
14	5 April 2026	The Super Mario Galaxy Movie	NZ$807,937	The Drama (#4)
15	12 April 2026	The Super Mario Galaxy Movie	NZ$778,032	Vaazha II: Biopic of a Billion Bros (#6), You, Me & Tuscany (#9)
16	19 April 2026	The Super Mario Galaxy Movie	NZ$771,982	Bhooth Bangla (#5), Lee Cronin's The Mummy (#6), Fuze (#9)
17	26 April 2026	Michael	NZ$1,022,873	Exit 8 (#10)
18	3 May 2026	The Devil wears Prada 2	NZ$1,399,664	Sgt Hanne (#5), Hokum (#6), Patriot (#7), The Time Travellers Guide to the Hamilton Gardens (#10)
19	10 May 2026	The Devil wears Prada 2	NZ$1,168,431	The Sheep Detectives (#3), Mortal Kombat II (#4), Billie Eilish Hit Me Hard and Soft (#5),
20	17 May 2026	Michael	NZ$655,448	In the Grey (#5), Obsession (#6), Top Gun (1986) - 40th Anniversary (#7), Caterpiller (#8), Pati Patni Aur Woh Do (#10)
21	24 May 2026	Star Wars: The Mandalorian and Grogu	NZ$934,355	Drishyam 3 (#4), Passenger (#9)
22	31 May 2026	Backrooms	NZ$883,042	Tuner (#7), Chardikala (#9)
23	7 June 2026	Backrooms	NZ$480,881	The Amazing Digital Circus: The Last Act (#4), Masters of the Universe (#5), Hai Jawani Toh Ishq Hona Hai (#9), The Christophers (#10)
24	14 June 2026	Disclosure Day	NZ$582,218	Scary Movie (#2), Colony (#8)
25	21 June 2026	Toy Story 5	NZ$1,350,854	Cocktail 2 (#7)
26	28 June 2026	Toy Story 5	NZ$783,496	Minions & Monsters (#2), Supergirl (#3), Dear You (#6), Welcome to the Jungle (#7)
27	5 July 2026	Toy Story 5	NZ$524,344	Jackass: Best and Last (#4), Alpha (#9)
28	12 July 2026	Moana	NZ$1,120,599	Dhamaal 4 (#4), Evil Dead Burn (#5), The Invite (#6)
29	19 July 2026	The Odyssey	NZ$2,050,000	
30	26 July 2026	The Odyssey	NZ$1,973,739	Jana Nayagan (#6), Colours of Time (#7)
31	2 August 2026	Spider-Man: Brand New Day	NZ$4,450,865	H is for Hawk (#7), Primavera (#10)
32	9 August 2026	Spider-Man: Brand New Day	NZ$2,365,673	Savage House (#8), Ice Cream Man (#9)
33	16 August 2026	Spider-Man: Brand New Day	NZ$1,226,908	The End of Oak Street (#3), One Night Only (#4), Awarapan 2 (#5), All Wishes Come True! (#8), Harry Potter and the Goblet of Fire (2005) R/I (#9), CatVideoFest 2026 (#10)
34	23 August 2026	Spider-Man: Brand New Day	NZ$696,815	Insidious: Out of the Further (#3), Spa Weekend (#5), Mutiny (#6), Bethlehem Kudumba Unit (#7), Tony (#8), Kung Fu Soccer (#9)
35	30 August 2026	Spider-Man: Brand New Day	NZ$448,752	André Rieu's 2026 Summer Concert: Viva Maastrich! (#2), The Dog Stars (#5), Harry Potter and the Philosopher's Stone (25th Anniversary) (#8), Toxic: A Fairy Tale for Grown-ups (#9)
36	6 September 2026	Spider-Man: Brand New Day	NZ$345,206	Lomu (#3), Fall 2: Deadpoint (#4), Mirzapur: The Movie (#6), Cars (20th Anniversary) (#7), By Any Means (#8)
37	13 September 2026	Practical Magic 2	NZ$414,904	Oasis: Don't Look Back in Anger (#5), Runner (#), Once Upon a Time in the Middle East (#7), De Gaulle: Liberté (#10)
38	20 September 2026	Resident Evil	NZ$463,308	PAW Patrol: The Dino Movie (#3), Forgotten Island (#4), Coyote vs. Acme (#6), Hanuman Ansh (#8), The Transformers: The Movie (1986) R/I (#9), Hope (#10)
39	27 September 2026	Heart of the Beast	NZ$674,640	Avengers Endgame Encore (#2), Shaun the Sheep: The Beast of Mossy Bottom(#10)
40	4 October 2026	Verity	NZ$493,990	Drishyam: The Conclusion (#3), Digger (#8)
41	11 October 2026	Heart of the Beast	NZ$303,282	Other Mommy (#4)
42	18 October 2026	Street Fighter	NZ$286,713	Sense and Sensibility (#2), Jailer 2 (#4), Hadestown: The Musical (#6), Whalefall (#8)
43	25 October 2026	Clayface	NZ$161,591	Wildwood (#5), Klara and the Sun (#6), Ali G: Who iz i? (#8)

== Highest-grossing films ==
Highest-grossing films of 2025
Rank	Title	Distributor	Domestic gross (NZ$)
1	Spider-man: Brand New Day	Sony	$12,598,678
2	The Odyssey	Universal	$10,561,331
3	Michael	Universal	$7,287,131
4	Toy Story 5	Walt Disney	$6,162,333
5	Project Hail Mary	Sony	$5,919,140
6	The Devil wears Prada 2	Walt Disney	$5,262,461
7	The Super Mario Galaxy Movie	Universal	$4,505,814
8	Moana	Walt Disney	$3,698,889
9	Minions & Monsters	Universal	$3,262,304
10	Obsession	Rialto Distribution	$3,106,791

5 highest-grossing New Zealand films of 2024
Rank	Title	Distributor	Domestic gross
1	Lomu		$405,898
3	Sgt Hanne		$286,879
3	Anchor Me: The Don McGlashan Story		$148,675
4	Time Travellers Guide to the Hamilton Gardens		$98,257
5	Lomu		$254,000

== Records ==
5 biggest openings
Rank	Title	Distributor	Opening weekend
1	Spider-man: Brand New Day	Sony	NZ$4,450,865
2	The Odyssey	Universal	NZ$2,050,000
3	The Devil wears Prada 2	Walt Disney	NZ$1,399,664
4	Toy Story 5	Walt Disney	NZ$1,350,854
5	Moana	Walt Disney	NZ$1,120,599

5 best second weekend holds for movies playing in more than 70 theatres
Rank	Title	2nd week hold
1	Send Help	-12%
2	GOAT	-12%
3	Hamnet	-20%
4	Fackham Hall	-20%

Worst second weekend hold for movie playing in more than 65 theatres
Rank	Title	2nd week hold
1	Mercy	-74%

Best per theater opening
Rank	Title	Per theater gross
1	Wuthering Heights	NZ$5,996

== See also ==
- List of New Zealand films – New Zealand films by year
- 2024 in film

Preceded by 2025	Box office number-one films 2026	Succeeded by 2027
