= One Lane Bridge =

New Zealand television crime drama series

- Genre: Crime drama
- Created by: Pip Hall; Philip Smith
- Written by: Pip Hall
- Directed by: Peter Burger
- Starring: Dominic Ona-Ariki; Joel Tobeck; Alison Bruce
- Composer: Claire Cowan
- Country of origin: New Zealand
- Original language: English
- No. of seasons: 3
- No. of episodes: 16

Production
- Executive producers: Philip Smith; Kathleen Anderson
- Production companies: Great Southern Television; TVNZ

Original release
- Release: 20 April 2020

One Lane Bridge is a New Zealand crime drama television series, premiering on TVNZ 1 in 2020. The series stars Dominic Ona-Ariki as Ariki Davis, a newcomer detective, Joel Tobeck as Stephen Tremaine, his superior, and Alison Bruce as Tremaine's wife, Lois. The show follows events around the latest in a mysterious chain of deaths which have occurred on a one-lane bridge near the town of Queenstown. The series is also notable for its inclusion of aspects of Māori spirituality as a core part of the plot, such as the notion of matakite, roughly equivalent to divination.

The series was filmed primarily in Queenstown and its surrounding area, with the eponymous bridge located over the Dart River / Te Awa Whakatipu near the township of Glenorchy, approximately 45 kilometres (28 mi) northwest of Queenstown. Other filming locations include the Queenstown waterfront and areas around the nearby town of Arrowtown.

One Lane Bridge premiered in April 2020 on TVNZ 1, in the middle of New Zealand's first lockdown of the COVID-19 pandemic. The show was met with mixed reviews, with Stuff's Malcolm Hopwood describing the characters as "tight-lipped, charmless, one-dimensional people" and the Spinoff's Catherine McGregor saying that the writing of the series "fails to live up to the drama of its breathtaking location". Stuff's James Croot was more positive, describing season 1 as "an engrossing, evocative, supernatural-tinged detective drama, a Central Otago-set Kiwi answer to Scandi-Noir complete with terrific performances from a well-assembled ensemble."

== Cast ==
- Dominic Ona-Ariki as Ariki Davis
- Joel Tobeck as Stephen Tremaine
- Alison Bruce as Lois Tremaine
- Alex Walker as Joe
- Phoebe McKellar as Tilly
- Michelle Langstone as Charlotte McCrae (Seasons 1–2)
- Phil Brown as Mark 'Haggis' McCrae (Seasons 1–2)
- Nathalie Morris as Emma Ryder (Seasons 1–2)
- Jared Turner as Rob Ryder (Seasons 1–2)
- Nicola Kānawa as Pounamu Edwards (Season 3)
- Roxie Mohebbi as Frankie Azad (Season 3)

== Episodes ==
=== Series overview ===
Series	Episodes	Originally released	
Series	Episodes	First released	Last released
1	6	20 April 2020	26 May 2020
2	5	15 August 2021	27 August 2021
3	5	7 November 2022	7 November 2022

=== Series 1 (2020) ===
No. overall	No. in series	Title	Directed by	Written by	Original release date	N.Z. viewers (thousand)
1	1	"Arrival"	Peter Burger	Pip Hall	20 April 2020	N/A
When new arrival Detective Ariki Davis investigates a tragic death at Queenstown's treacherous one lane bridge, he inadvertently unleashes a mysterious gift.
2	2	"Denial"	Peter Burger	Pip Hall	27 April 2020	N/A
Ariki is in complete denial about the terrifying presence that is invading his life. Meanwhile, the Ryder family implodes under the strain of mourning their loved one and unsettling truths come to light.
3	3	"Escape"	Peter Burger	Pip Hall	4 May 2020	N/A
Ariki makes bad choices in an attempt to escape his demons. Meanwhile, frustrated with the investigation's lack of progress, the locals deal out some vigilante justice of their own.
4	4	"Fall"	Danny Mulheron	Pip Hall	11 May 2020	N/A
Stephen is put under pressure when Lois is brought in for official questioning. Meanwhile, Ariki's inappropriate behaviour jeopardises both his professional career and the case.
5	5	"Acceptance"	Danny Mulheron	Pip Hall	18 May 2020	N/A
When Ariki accepts his gift, things finally start fitting into place.
6	6	"Answers"	Danny Mulheron	Pip Hall	25 May 2020	N/A
Ariki uncovers the answers, but not the truth, as his gift helps him solve the final piece of the puzzle.

=== Series 2 (2021) ===
No. overall	No. in series	Title	Directed by	Written by	Original release date	N.Z. viewers (thousand)
7	1	"Consequences"	Peter Burger	Pip Hall	15 August 2021	N/A
Ariki embraces his gift and saves a life on One Lane Bridge, but soon after, another body is found.
8	2	"Vigil"	Peter Burger	Pip Hall	22 August 2021	N/A
Blaming his visions for letting him down, Ariki fails to take heed when he's warned of another disaster.
9	3	"Faith"	Peter Burger	Pip Hall	27 August 2021	N/A
Ariki gets too close to the prime suspects and jeopardises the case.
10	4	"Betrayal"	Peter Burger	Pip Hall	27 August 2021	N/A
Ariki is thrown off guard when a long-held secret about the young murdered man comes to the surface.
11	5	"Bombshell"	Peter Burger	Pip Hall	27 August 2021	N/A
Ariki makes an arrest, only to discover a new clue and a betrayal.

=== Series 3 (2022) ===
No. overall	No. in series	Title	Directed by	Written by	Original release date	N.Z. viewers (thousand)
12	1	"Shake Up"	Robert Sarkies	Pip Hall	7 November 2022	N/A
With the arrival of a staunch new boss, and his integrity as a cop brought into question, Ariki's life gets a massive shake up.
13	2	"No Distractions"	Robert Sarkies	Pip Hall	7 November 2022	N/A
Tricky work politics and personal secrets make it difficult for Ariki to focus on the murder investigation.
14	3	"Crash & Burn"	Robert Sarkies	Pip Hall	7 November 2022	N/A
Pressure explodes as Ariki’s personal and professional lives collide.
15	4	"Buckle Up"	Caroline Bell-Booth	Pip Hall	7 November 2022	N/A
Things get bumpy for Ariki and Tilly as locals throw their weight and privilege around.
16	5	"Lost & Found"	Caroline Bell-Booth	Pip Hall	7 November 2022	N/A
Ariki closes in on all the answers, but did he turn his back on One Lane Bridge too soon?

== Production ==
Season 1 of One Lane Bridge was filmed over three months in late 2019 by Great Southern Television, entirely on location in the Queenstown area. The series initially had a budget of NZ$7 million, which was supported through funding from NZ on Air, Australia's Seven Network, and All3Media. Filming for season 2 took place over 10 weeks in February 2021, on a slightly smaller budget of $6 million. Queenstown mayor Jim Boult has been vocally supportive of the series, having written a letter of support to help secure funding for the production of the show's second season.

In September 2021, TVNZ announced that One Lane Bridge had been renewed for a third season and pledged up to $5,945,400 for this, which it said would "build on the previous season's talent development opportunities across directing, production, and script writing for local and emerging practitioners." Season three premiered on TVNZ1 on 7 November 2022, with all episodes in the series available for streaming on TVNZ's online platform TVNZ+ at the same point.
