= Nathalie Morris =

Australian actress

- Born: Canberra, Australia
- Education: Toi Whakaari (2018)
- Occupation: Actress
- Years active: 2016–present
- Known for: Oly Chalmers-Davis in Bump

Nathalie Morris is an Australian film, television and stage actress. Morris is best known for her role as Oly Chalmers-Davis in television series Bump.

== Early life ==
Morris grew up in Canberra before moving to New Zealand to study acting at New Zealand drama school Toi Whakaari, graduating in 2018, with a Bachelor of Performing Arts degree.

== Career ==
Following her graduating from acting school, Morris appeared in the 2018 New Zealand horror film Killer Sofa. In 2019, she had a role in Blumhouse Productions' US slasher film Black Christmas alongside Imogen Poots, also appearing in a stage production of The Audience, the same year, playing a young Queen Elizabeth. The following year, she appeared in the American crime drama series Almost Paradise and the first two seasons of New Zealand hit series One Lane Bridge.

In 2020, Morris was named to appear in the new Stan series Bump, alongside Claudia Karvan and Angus Sampson. In her breakout role, she played the character of Oly Chalmers-Davis, navigating life with a newborn baby while still in high school. Morris appeared in every episode of all five seasons of the Logie and AACTA-nominated show and wrote an episode in season five. 2020 also saw Morris play the role of Nina in Auckland Theatre Company's production of Chekhov's The Seagull, which screened online during COVID and received worldwide critical acclaim.

In 2022 Morris filmed the movie We Were Dangerous on location in New Zealand, with it releasing in 2024. During this time, she also had a lead role in 2022 Australian thriller feature Petrol, which was nominated for the Golden Leopard award at the Locarno International Film Festival.

Morris was named as a rising star of 2023 by the Casting Guild of Australia, for her "potential to break out on the world stage”.

In December 2024, Morris was named in the extended cast for season three of the Fox drama series The Twelve, with Sam Neill, Marta Dusseldorp, and Brendan Cowell. In February 2025, it was announced that she would reprise her role as Oly for the Bump: A Christmas Film movie. The film takes place between Bump's ninth and tenth episodes of season five.

== Personal life ==
Since 2024, Morris has been in a relationship with director Stevie Cruz-Martin.

Morris is a fluent French speaker.

== Filmography ==
=== Television ===
Year	Title	Role	Notes	Ref.
2019	Shortland Street	Layla Day	3 episodes	
2020	Almost Paradise	Evelyn Walker	1 episode	
2020–2021	One Lane Bridge	Emma Ryder	Seasons 1–2, 11 episodes	
2021–2026	Bump	Oly Chalmers-Davis	Main role, seasons 1–5, 50 episodes	
2024	Just a Farmer	Jean	TV movie	
2025	The Twelve	Jazmyn Tanner	Season 3, 8 episodes	
2025	Bump: A Christmas Film	Oly Chalmers-Davis	TV movie	

=== Film ===
Year	Title	Role	Notes	Ref.
2017	Cade	Diane	Feature film	
2018	Killer Sofa	Maxi	Feature film (direct to DVD)	
2019	Black Christmas	Fran	Feature film	
2021	Nine White Moons	Initialled Woman	Short film	
2022	Petrol	Eva	Feature film	
2024	We Were Dangerous	Lou	Feature film	
2025	5'12"	Boogie	Short film	

== Stage ==
Year	Title	Role	Notes
Undated	4.48 Psychosis	Lead	Canberra Youth Theatre
Undated	Run Rihanna! Run!	Cassie	Canberra Youth Theatre
Undated	Studio Underground	Ensemble	Canberra Youth Theatre
Undated	Dead Men's Wars	Charlie	Canberra Youth Theatre
Undated	Rib	Ensemble	
Undated	Flat Land	Solo Show	Workcenter of Jerzy Grotowski and Thomas Richards
2016	Solo Season '16	Solo Show	Toi Whakaari
2016	The Glass Menagerie	Amanda	Toi Whakaari
2017	Romeo and Juliet	Juliet	Toi Whakaari
2017	Once on This Island	Andrea	Toi Whakaari
2018	The Wolves	#2	Toi Whakaari
2019	Never Thought I'd Have to Explain it All	One Woman Show	Public Fodder
2019	The Audience	Young Queen Elizabeth	Auckland Theatre Company
2020	The Seagull	Nina	Auckland Theatre Company
2022	Tell Them I'm Here	Georgia	Belvoir, Sydney
2026	Room With a View	Lucy Honeychurch	Melbourne Theatre Company
