= Tom Furniss =

New Zealand comedian and screenwriter (born 1988)

- Born: Tom Annan Furniss; 29 May 1988 (age 38)
- Occupation: comedian
- Years active: 2009 - present

Tom Annan Furniss (born 1988) is a New Zealand comedian.

== Life and career ==
Tom grew up in Mount Maunganui. He studied Screen and Media Studies at The University of Waikato. In early 2010 he was selected as a finalist in Raw Comedy Quest. In the 2011 New Zealand International Comedy Festival Tom performed alongside John Carr in their debut show ‘Cold Duck and Tamogotchis’. In 2011 his team Grand Cheval Productions won the 48HOURS Filmmaking Competition with their mockumentary about chumping; men who jump over children.
