= Fern Sutherland =

New Zealand actress (born 1987)

- Born: 17 October 1987 (age 39); New Plymouth, New Zealand
- Education: Unitec Institute of Technology (BFA)
- Occupation: Actress
- Years active: 2006 – present
- Partner: Jarrod Kilner (2008–2022)

Fern Sutherland (born 17 October 1987) is a New Zealand actress, best known for her roles as Dawn in The Almighty Johnsons, and Detective Sims in The Brokenwood Mysteries.

== Early life and education ==
Sutherland spent her first three years in Mangakino, where her parents worked as shearing contractors. Her family then moved to New Plymouth where her father worked as a landscape laborer and her mother became a waitress.

She attended Sacred Heart Girls College in New Plymouth, and then at age 18 she moved to Auckland to attend Unitec Institute of Technology for drama school.

== Career ==
Starting her career as a lead artiste in short films produced by the UNITEC Performing Arts School, Sutherland pursued her acting work in theatre shows like Silo Theatre's Ensemble Project 08, the Auckland Theatre Company’s The Pohutakawa Tree (2009) and The End of the Golden Weather (2011), among others. Later, she ventured into television plays for South Pacific Pictures, doing small roles in Go Girls and The Almighty Johnsons. Since 2014, Sutherland has shared top billing in the series The Brokenwood Mysteries.

She has said of herself, "I get extreme stage fright and really bad anxiety, so by rights acting is probably the worst career choice for me, but the truth is I really love being able to create and bring characters to life."

Sutherland received a nomination for best supporting actress at the 2011 Aotearoa Film and Television Awards (AFTAs) for her role in The Almighty Johnsons.

== Personal life ==
Her partner from 2008 to 2022 was Jarrod Kilner. She moved to Canada at the end of 2018 with Kilner, before returning to New Zealand in 2020 to ensure she could continue filming for The Brokenwood Mysteries without disruption from COVID-19 border closures. After the end of her relationship with Kilner, she has split her time between New Zealand and Thailand, where she spends months at a time practicing Muay Thai in Phuket.

== Film ==
Year	Title	Role	Notes
2006	A Book By Its Cover	Lead	Dir: Campbell Rousselle
2007	Trash	Poppy	Dir: John Callen
2010	Thud	Nurse	Dir: Nick Graham
2024	The Mountain	Wendy	Dir: Rachel House
2024	A Mistake	Jessica	Dir: Christine Jeffs

== Television ==
Year	Title	Role	Notes
2010	Go Girls	Drunk Girl #3	"Boys Behaving Badly" (S02E09)
2011-2013	The Almighty Johnsons	Dawn	Series regular
2014–present	The Brokenwood Mysteries	Detective Kristin Sims	Main role
2025	My Life is Murder	Louise	S05E07, S05E08
