= Aroha Bridge =

- Genre: Animated sitcom
- Created by: Jessica Hansell
- Based on: Hook Ups by Jessica Hansell
- Written by: Jessica Hansell; Madeleine Sami; Morgan Waru
- Directed by: Jessica Hansell; Simon Ward
- Creative director: Carthew Neal
- Voices of: Jessica Hansell; Rizván Tu’Itahi; Madeleine Sami; Frankie Stevens; Scotty Cotter
- Composers: Disasteradio; Coco Solid; Jizmatron
- Country of origin: New Zealand
- Original languages: English; Māori
- No. of seasons: 3
- No. of episodes: 21

Production
- Executive producer: Paul Horan
- Producer: Morgan Waru
- Running time: 3 minutes (Season 1); 5 minutes (Season 2); 30 minutes (Season 3)
- Production company: Piki Films

Original release
- Network: The New Zealand Herald (Season 1); Māori Television, Stuff (Season 3)
- Release: May 23, 2013 – August 30, 2019

Aroha Bridge is a New Zealand adult animated comedy by Jessica Hansell. The series focuses on the biracial twins Kōwhai and Monty Hook as they navigate the fictional community of Aroha Bridge and their pursuit in finding stardom. Aroha Bridge began as a webcomic entitled Hook Ups, which was first published in Volume magazine in 2011. It was later renamed and made into a series of 3 minute online shorts that first aired on The New Zealand Herald website. Aroha Bridge was later greenlit as a full series with funding from NZ On Air and aired on Māori Television. The animated series first aired on 23 May 2013, and stars Jessica Hansell, Rizván Tu’Itahi, Madeleine Sami, Frankie Stevens, and Scotty Cotter.

== Synopsis ==
Aroha Bridge focuses on the fictional community of Aroha Bridge and the multicultural community within it, with a focus on "authentic, urban Māori characters". The series focuses on the biracial twins Kōwhai and Monty Hook as they try to navigate the complex relations of their whānau and hometown all while the two try to achieve stardom.

== Characters ==
The main cast of Aroha Bridge (from left to right): Mum Hook, Manu Hook, Uncle Noogy, Kōwhai Hook, Monty Hook, Ira Hook, Aunty Winny, Angeline Hook

=== Main ===
- Jessica Hansell as Kōwhai Hook, the motivated but also mildly delusional twin sister of Monty, of whom she forms half of the band "Hook Ups" with.
- Rizván Tu'itahi as Monty Hook, the laid-back and talented twin brother of Kōwhai, of whom forms half of the band "Hook Ups" with.
- Madeleine Sami as Mum Hook, the mother of Kōwhai and Monty and described as being "pakeha on the outside, wannabe Māori on the inside". She is passionate about Te Reo, but is not fluent in the language, reflective of other amateurs in New Zealand.
- Frankie Stevens as Manu Hook, the father of Kōwhai and Monty, described as the reverse of Mum Hook, in that he is Māori on the outside and wannabe Pākeha on the inside, suppressing his internalized racism. Manu is a former military member and enjoys rugby, he additionally cannot stand his brother Noogy.
- Scotty Cotter as Ira Hook, the twins' eccentric cousin who serves as their band's number one fan and as comic encouragement towards the twins' shenanigans.

=== Recurring ===
- Madeleine Sami as Angeline Hook, the twins' 10-year old cousin who is a successful international pop star. She serves as Kōwhai's nemesis.
- Madeleine Sami as Aunty Winny, the twins' sporty aunt.
- Oscar Kightley as Mayor TokoUso, the Samoan/Tongan mayor of Aroha Bridge and described as having a model minority complex.
- Julian Dennison as Tapi, a street hustler who deals in dubious goods.
- Matai Smith as Uncle Noogy, the twins' activist uncle and Polynesian Panther who exclusively speaks in the Māori language.
- Rachel House as Whaea Bubbles, the twins' grandmother. Hansell described as a "a Frankenstein of everybody’s whaea".

== Production ==
Aroha Bridge was originally entitled Hook Ups, and began as a webcomic by Jessica Hansell, also known as Coco Solid, which was first published in 2011 by the music magazine Volume. Hansell was asked to create a comic by the editor of Volume, Sam Wicks. It was then developed into a ten-part short web animation, which debuted on The New Zealand Herald website. Before being fully greenlit as an animated series with support by NZ On Air's Brenda Leeuwenberg, with the show airing on Māori Television.

The series had been renamed following concerns by fans who would google up the original title and would instead find pornography under the same title. The title was chosen "because it's a big part of the show, in terms of geography, their suburb, their whānau" according to Hansell. The inclusion of words in the Māori language in a naturalistic format was part of the ethos of the show, Hansell stated that the show's team wanted to make Māoridom a "natural, braided thing". In addition, the new name of the show was a reference to Māngere Bridge, where Hansell had grown up. The show's location is inspired by Māngere Bridge during the 1980s and 1990s, but additionally has "DNA from Porirua and Newtown and the Waikato." It was described by Hansell as a "Frankenstein beast of all of my friends, family, and me – showing that everyone is connected whether we like it or not", and that the characters were all a tiny part of her.

=== Themes ===
Aroha Bridge addresses and amplifies contemporary social issues facing Pasifika New Zealanders and Pacific culture. Alex Behan, writing in Stuff, commented that the show offers a "layered world addressing Aotearoa's cultural issues with a mix of insight, outrage and comedy". The first episode of the second season discusses themes of generational resentment, cultural appropriation, and hypocrisy in politics. The first episode of the third season touches on the Hollywood perception of the Pacific and the exploitation of Pacific culture for financial gain. The second episode of the third season discusses the systemic barriers that Māori face in the education system in attaining proper education and scholarships. In the fourth episode of the third season, the episode discusses the issue of loan sharking in low-income areas. The third season often addresses the right to protest, reflecting the events at Ihumātao that were happening as the season aired.

The portrayal of the series' characters is intended to spark a nuanced conversation on the social factors leading to their characterization, including Manu's internalized racism and Uncle Noogy's radical activism. The series' humor was described by Hansell as being rooted in multiculturalism. The portrayal of the characters in Aroha Bridge is meant to dispel stereotypes and dispel previous instances of superficial and reductive treatment of Māori and Pasifika with regards to their representations in media. The development for the individual characters which series showcases was described as "mad developed" by Leonie Hayden in The Spinoff.

The series' four Māori writers are credited for the series' nuanced approach towards contemporary issues facing the Māori community, with their lived experienced and "cultural truth" being reflected in the series. Hansell cited her frustration with the "same archetypes tumble drying all the time", getting into storytelling to prioritize Māori and Pacific stories. Hansell describes the show's mixture of animation and comedy masking a deeper subtext that would come out to viewers as they watch the show, stressing that there needs to be recognition in New Zealand for the "counter-cultural freedom" that adult animation overseas is recognized for. Comedy, as Hansell describes, is a way for her to cope with the politics and dysfunction that she sees in her daily life.

== Episodes ==
Season	Episodes	Originally released	
Season	Episodes	First released	Last released
1	9	May 23, 2013	July 4, 2013
2	6	July 3, 2016	July 3, 2016
3	6	July 26, 2019	August 30, 2019

=== Season 1 (2013) ===
No. overall	No. in season	Title	Directed by	Written by	Original release date
1	1	"Benny's 21st"	Simon Ward	Jessica Hansell	May 23, 2013
2	2	"Kiri the Krazy Kea"	Simon Ward	Jessica Hansell	May 23, 2013
3	3	"Art to Art"	Simon Ward	Jessica Hansell	May 23, 2013
4	4	"Amcray"	Simon Ward	Jessica Hansell	May 30, 2013
5	5	"Aroha Bridge Factor"	Simon Ward	Jessica Hansell	June 6, 2013
6	6	"Triple Threat"	Simon Ward	Jessica Hansell	June 13, 2013
7	7	"Space Invasion"	Simon Ward	Jessica Hansell	June 20, 2013
8	8	"MeTube"	Simon Ward	Jessica Hansell	June 27, 2013
9	9	"Halloween"	Simon Ward	Jessica Hansell	July 4, 2013

=== Season 2 (2016) ===
No. overall	No. in season	Title	Directed by	Written by	Original release date
10	1	"Angeline in Concert"	Simon Ward; Jessica Hansell	Jessica Hansell	July 3, 2016
11	2	"Plastic Maori"	Simon Ward; Jessica Hansell	Jessica Hansell	July 3, 2016
12	3	"Radical Bro"	Simon Ward; Jessica Hansell	Jessica Hansell	July 3, 2016
13	4	"Iron Maori Maiden"	Simon Ward; Jessica Hansell	Jessica Hansell	July 3, 2016
14	5	"Kowhai Has A Crisis"	Simon Ward; Jessica Hansell	Jessica Hansell	July 3, 2016
15	6	"Ira's Antique Roadshow"	Simon Ward; Jessica Hansell	Jessica Hansell	July 3, 2016

=== Season 3 (2019) ===
No. overall	No. in season	Title	Directed by	Written by	Original release date
16	1	"Stealing The Show"	Simon Ward; Jessica Hansell	Jessica Hansell; Madeleine Sami	July 26, 2019
17	2	"Scholarchips and a Drink"	Simon Ward; Jessica Hansell	Jessica Hansell; Morgan Waru	August 2, 2019
18	3	"Legally M'orange"	Simon Ward; Jessica Hansell	Jessica Hansell	August 9, 2019
19	4	"Mind ya Business"	Simon Ward; Jessica Hansell	Jessica Hansell	August 16, 2019
20	5	"Marae Mysteries"	Simon Ward; Jessica Hansell	Jessica Hansell; Madeleine Sami	August 23, 2019
21	6	"The Wall"	Simon Ward; Jessica Hansell	Jessica Hansell	August 30, 2019

== Reception ==
Alex Behan writing for Stuff described Aroha Bridge as a "cultural minefield of sorts", stating that the show "manages to walk the delicate tightrope that only brilliantly pitched satire can". Behan praised the portrayal of some of the series' characters for how they take "painful ugly realities and [mine] them for laughs", and the thought that was put into the show's production would "cement Jessica Hansell as one of Aotearoa's most important voices".

Miriama Aoake writing in Pantograph Punch described her familiarity with the characters that the show had portrayed. Stating there had "never been a TV show that can both reflect and deny those buzzy idiosyncrasies in a whānau dynamic", describing it as both "disarming and affirming". Aoake praised the marriage of humor and animation to deliver a sensation that "hits like a delayed concussion".

Rachel Montpelier writing in Women and Hollywood stated that the show's interesting and multifaceted presentation surpassed a comparison with combination of the family dynamics in Transparent, the world building found in Orange Is the New Black, and Key & Peele's dissection on the expressions of race. Describing Aroha Bridge as "rare series that has a defined point-of-view, a balance of specific and universal humor".

=== Accolades ===
Aroha Bridge has been featured in several film festivals including the SBS Short Film Festival, ImagineNATIVE Film and Media Arts Festival, and the Mother Tongue Film Festival. In 2019, the series won "Best Web Series" in a field of 15 during the 2019 Los Angeles Film Awards. The show was nominated during the 2020 NZ TV awards for the category of "Best Comedy/Comedy Entertainment Program", but lost to Wellington Paranormal.

Award nominations for Aroha Bridge
Year	Award	Category	Result	Source
2019	Los Angeles Film Awards	Best Web Series	Won	
2020	New Zealand film and television awards	Best Comedy/Comedy Entertainment Programme	Nominated	
