= Petrol (film) =

- Directed by: Alena Lodkina
- Written by: Alena Lodkina
- Produced by: Kate Laurie
- Starring: Nathalie Morris; Hannah Lynch
- Cinematography: Michael Latham
- Edited by: Luca Cappelli
- Music by: Raven Mahon; Mikey Young
- Production company: Arenamedia
- Release date: 5 August 2022 (Locarno Film Festival)
- Running time: 95 minutes
- Country: Australia
- Languages: English; Russian
- Box office: $12,386

Petrol is a 2022 Australian drama film directed by Alena Lodkina, starring Nathalie Morris and Hannah Lynch.

== Cast ==
- Nathalie Morris as Eva
- Hannah Lynch as Mia
- Inga Romantsova as Victoria
- Alex Menglet as Vladimir

== Release ==
The film premiered at the Locarno Film Festival in Switzerland on 5 August 2022.

It was released in cinemas in Sydney and Melbourne from May and June 2023 respectively, and on streaming service SBS on Demand in August 2023.

== Reception ==
On the review aggregator website Rotten Tomatoes, 100% of 7 critics' reviews are positive, with an average rating of 7.30/10.

Erwan Debois of the International Cinephile Society rated the film 3.5 stars out of 5, writing that "Lodkina does not seek nor need any pretext to go deep into the jungle with her characters, which proves to be the perfect setting – along with the kind of magical hotel / cabaret concealed in it – to bring her heartfelt and singular coming-of-age tale to an open-ended conclusion." Phil Hoad of The Guardian rated the film 3 stars out of 5, calling it "an experience that’s difficult to categorise and often tough to enjoy, but captivating in subtle ways". Stephen A. Russell of Time Out rated the film 3 stars out of 5, writing that "in its best moments, Petrol reminds us that Lodkina is clearly a talented filmmaker to watch, with big ideas and plenty more left in the tank". Jason Di Rosso of the ABC Radio National's The Screen Show called it "a powerful film about love and women's friendships", refers to the director's "sophisticated style" and "lightness of touch"", and says the film is reminiscent of "the psychoanalytic turn in art cinema of the 1960s and 70s" such as Ingrid Bergman's Persona.

== See also ==
- Cinema of Australia
