= Wa$ted! (American TV series) =

- Genre: Reality
- Created by: Carthew Neal
- Presented by: Annabelle Gurwitch; Holter Graham
- Country of origin: United States
- No. of seasons: 3
- No. of episodes: 26

Production
- Running time: 25 mins.

Original release
- Network: TLC; Planet Green
- Release: April 15, 2008 – June 2, 2010

Related
- Wa$ted!

Wa$ted! is an American reality series which ran on Planet Green and was hosted by Annabelle Gurwitch and Holter Graham. It originated from a television show from New Zealand by the same name.

Six episodes were shown on TLC before the show was moved to Planet Green. Some people got confused about the original airdate of those six episodes because they were rearranged with the final four episodes of the first season.

== Format ==
The show opens with the hosts giving the family or business an overview of their wasteful life and returning to them months worth of their own trash. They then have to sort through it and are shown all the hazardous, recyclable, and reusable items they have wasted. Next they examine the house and point out faults such as heating, aging machines, lights and televisions being on, automobiles, and water use among other things.

Based on all this, an ecological footprint is created to show how many acres it takes to sustain the household. The hosts then help the family or business implement greener alternatives and change their wasteful habits. They also promise to match the amount that they save in utilities and the like by projecting the totals forward for one year.

The family or business is given three weeks to change their habits. Afterward, they are evaluated on how well they did, given a new footprint based on their new habits, and awarded money equal to their energy savings.

== Episodes ==
=== Series overview ===
Season	Episodes	Originally aired	
Season	Episodes	Season premiere	Season finale
1	10	April 15, 2008	July 23, 2008
2	10	April 22, 2009	June 24, 2009
3	10	April 21, 2010	June 2, 2010

=== Season 1 (2008) ===
No. overall	No. in season	Title	Group	Original release date
1	1	"Everybody Gets a Car!"	The Zellers	April 15, 2008
From fuel costs to lights on 24/7, the Zeller family's waste starkly contrasts with their house. On the outside, their house looks like a grandiose castle manor, but inside, their medieval wasteful habits need a makeover.
2	2	"Fraternal Affairs"	Sigma Pi Fraternity	April 20, 2008
Sigma Pi Fraternity is home to 17 frat brothers who don't have a clue about how wasteful they are. These dudes work hard in school, but also play hard at home, and efforts to conserve are overlooked for convenience.
3	3	"NYPD Green"	TBA	April 26, 2008
Meet Todd and Rita, and their baby son, Travis. They have been so wrapped up in raising their son that they have neglected their environmental concerns. From wasting electricity to gas guzzling SUVs, it's time for the family to make a change!
4	4	"Style Over Substance"	TBA	May 4, 2008
James and Dean's fast paced habits are bad for the environment. From long wasteful showers, to cabs out to all the clubs, to throwing out yesterday's fashions—these men should know better—and Wa$ted sends in the experts to show them the way.
5	5	"Sex and the City"	Roommates	May 8, 2008
Kisha, Donna, Cindy and Becky live in an amazing loft space in trendy Green Point in Brooklyn. All four of them have disparate jobs—one works at a model agency, one is in finance, one is a flight attendant, and one works in advertising—and the four have intense, vibrant personalities. One thing, however, they share is a disastrous wasteful streak.
6	6	"Clean Up This Mess"	The Cavallaros	May 15, 2008
The Cavallaros are your typical nuclear family with two kids, a dog, and NINE televisions that are always on. This family thinks recycling is a waste of space; they don't even own a bin. With their wasteful habits, the family is crying for a green clean up.
7	7	"He Said, She Said"	TBA	June 23, 2008
Glynis is very interested in making her household eco-friendly but doesn't know where to start. Her husband Howard, on the other hand, is not so concerned and would rather take convenience over conservation.
8	8	"Bend it Like Livingston"	TBA	June 26, 2008
Dawn and Rich are the parents of three precocious daughters in a high-end gated community in southern New Jersey. This family is filled with energy, and is always on the go, but is also wasting energy left and right.
9	9	"Where There's Smoke..."	TBA	July 16, 2008
Joe is engaged to Laurel, and they live in a house in rural New Jersey with her sister, Alexa. They love living in the country and their house would be a perfect model of green living, except that their road to green is paved with good intentions gone sour.
10	10	"Bed and Breakfast"	The Alexander Hamilton House	July 23, 2008
The Alexander Hamilton House is a charming Bed and Breakfast in New York. Come and stay in this eight-bedroom inn, enjoy the scenic views of the Hudson River, the heated pool, and please feel free to contribute to an astronomical energy bill - $1600 a month!

=== Season 2 (2009) ===
No. overall	No. in season	Title	Group	Original release date
11	1	"Green Preservation"	TBA	April 22, 2009
A couple with two young children is in the process of restoring their home built in the 1900s. The only problem is that many of the products they are using to remodel contain toxic chemicals creating dangerous indoor fumes that can be harmful to the whole family. Annabelle and Holter introduce them to an array of eco-friendly alternatives that aren't made with toxins but can still do the job in a much healthier way.
12	2	"Sisterhood of Wa$te"	Alpha Chi Omega sorority	April 22, 2009
Twenty college girls live at the Alpha Chi Omega Sorority House. They recently attended a conference on living green and came home with poor grades on that front. Those computers, mini-refrigerators, and hair dryers create a staggering utility bill. When they see the truckload of plastic they toss every month, the lesson hits home. Classes officially start when Annabelle and Holter give them their assignments, with the girls' final just a few weeks away. Will they get an 'A' in waste management or will it turn out to be a wasted opportunity?
13	3	"Firemen Go Green"	Firemen	April 29, 2009
Firehouses are open 24/7, meaning the lights stay on, the doors stay open and there is much trash—much of it paper and plastic proof that firemen like all things disposable. From recycling to recipes, Annabelle and Holter show 20 firefighters how to green up.
14	4	"Big House, Big Waste"	TBA	May 13, 2009
Annabelle and Holter visit Mike and Julie's dream house which is sapping their savings with huge energy costs and family habits that need to change. Mom, Dad, four kids, and even their three dogs and two cats, take on Annabelle's family challenge to reduce waste and earn some cash.
15	5	"Sabbath Green"	The Ehrlichs	May 20, 2009
The Ehrlich family observes Orthodox Jewish teaching to the letter of the law. Annabelle and Holter help them learn to keep faith with the environment as well.
16	6	"Rockin' Out in Staten Island"	The Salomes	May 27, 2009
The Salome home redefines excess. Sal, his brother Paul, and daughter Samantha live in a fixer-upper Sal transformed into a rock-star playground for all ages. With an overheated outdoor pool cranking year round and Sal's stage lit bedroom, the family spends an astounding $20,000 a year on utilities! But even if money's no object, the Salomes are in dire need of some fixes, and are sure to be Annabelle and Holter's greatest challenge yet.
17	7	"A Basic Education"	TBA	June 3, 2009
At a busy pre-school, Annabelle and Holter instruct children and teachers alike about ways to go green and save green in the process. A new game turns the kids on to recycling, and their teachers learn to start setting the example with new, eco-friendly products for arts and crafts. There are also lessons about how excess waste can hurt the planet.
18	8	"Elle's Challenge"	The McGees	June 10, 2009
Elle McGee wants to live green so she called us for help. Her world dramatically changed when husband Ed was called to active duty in Iraq, leaving her on her own with a chilly house and baby son, Malachi. She keeps TVs on in every room just out of loneliness, and she can't figure out the right way to dispose of the construction waste piled up in her garage. Elle goes into eco-plan overdrive when Annabelle and Holter come to the rescue.
19	9	"Grandma Knows Best"	The Poislers	June 17, 2009
With three generations living together, the Poisler family's 1800s vintage house generates huge energy bills. Annabelle and Holter show them innovative ways to cut costs, change bad habits and protect the environment, including an ingenious solution for replacing outdated appliances while recycling the old appliances.
20	10	"A Hairy Problem"	TBA	June 24, 2009
A beauty salon has environmental challenges that no household could imagine. Toxic chemicals are part of the process, and high-volume lighting and constant hot water mean huge utilities expenses. There's little attention to the landfill, since recycling and reuse are ignored. Annabelle and Holter offer stylish solutions and even show the owners how to recycle all that hair!

=== Season 3 (2010) ===
No. overall	No. in season	Title	Group	Original release date
21	1	"Sweet Melissa's Patisserie"	Sweet Melissa's Patisserie	April 21, 2010
This quaint and upscale neighborhood bakery in Brooklyn, NY may bake delicious gourmet treats but unfortunately that's not all they're making. Home to a feast of wasteful ways, a new ingredient is added when Wa$ted! host, Annabelle Gurwitch pays a visit to show them how they have bitten off more than the planet can chew.
22	2	"The Brady Bunch"	TBA	April 28, 2010
This true to life Brady Bunch style family of nine is living like a community of none and creating far more waste than necessary. Wa$ted host, Annabelle Gurwitch, delivers some challenges to reduce their waste, but the very first challenge might just turn them off altogether...
23	3	"The Fernandes Family"	The Fernandes	May 5, 2010
Eldest son Tony Jr. has been trying to convince his family of five that their wasteful practices are unnecessary and too costly to continue. But he?s clearly out on his own and even with the help of Wa$ted! host, Annabelle Gurwitch, he might not be able to teach his family the error of their wasteful ways.
24	4	"Once Upon a Sundae"	Once Upon a Sundae	May 12, 2010
Making kids dreams come true is the mantra of this party throwing business in Long Island, NY. But with so many disposable dishes, discarded arts and crafts, toxic paints and polish, and enough garbage to fill an ice cream truck — those dreams are nothing but a nightmare for the planet.
25	5	"These Three Bachelors"	Roommates	May 19, 2010
Rudy, Matt and Randall work hard and play hard but their lifestyle is leaving a wasteful trail behind them. To get to the meat of this problem, Wa$ted! host, Annabelle Gurwitch, brings them face to face with their consumption and attempts to beef up their knowledge on the effect they?re having on the planet.
26	6	"Driving Mrs. New Jersey"	TBA	May 19, 2010
Mrs. New Jersey, her car obsessed husband Lorenzo, and their beautiful children are living quite the lavish lifestyle. Beauty products galore, gas guzzling vehicles, an RV, an open plan enormous home, televisions and lights on everywhere — make this picture perfect family the picture perfect challenge for Wa$ted!
27	7	"The Space Family"	The Spaces	May 26, 2010
Never afraid to take on new and exciting challenges, Wa$ted! host, Annabelle Gurwitch, arms herself with the facts and goes under fire to meet the Space Family. These hunters and Zoo keepers maintain that global warming is for attention seekers and that the world will never run out of electricity. Anyone detecting a clash?
28	8	"Hyper Diapers"	TBA	May 26, 2010
Mary Jo and Bob have four kids – all under the age of two! Oldest child Tyler was followed by the triplets; Chase, Cooper and Colbea. Adorable as they all are, they're not painting the prettiest picture for the environment. WA$TED host Annabelle Gurwitch pays a visit to see if there might be alternatives to problems such as 13,000 disposable diapers a year.
29	9	"Paper Capers"	EFK Group	June 2, 2010
Challenged by an industry that is one of the paper wasting leaders by nature, Wa$ted host Annabelle Gurwitch has her work cut out for her when visiting the advertising agency, EFK Group. Find out if it is possible to teach a company new ways of doing business and still remain efficient and at the top of their game.
30	10	"Gone to the Dogs"	Five Star Kennels	June 2, 2010
Five Star Kennels is a family run dog grooming, boarding and training facility. High energy bills, 500 pounds of discarded dog hair a year and over $7000 a year spent on paper towels has Annabelle working hard to help put their wasteful ways on a leash before the planet goes to the dogs.
