= Wa$ted! (New Zealand TV series) =

- Genre: Reality
- Created by: Carthew Neal
- Presented by: Francesca Price; Tristan Glendinning
- Composer: Jed Town
- Country of origin: New Zealand
- Original language: English
- No. of series: 2
- No. of episodes: 20

Production
- Executive producer: Jane Millichip
- Producer: Carthew Neal
- Running time: 30 minutes (including advertisements)
- Production company: Fumes TV

Original release
- Network: TV3
- Release: 20 February 2007 – 8 April 2008

Wa$ted! is a New Zealand reality television series which shows families their impact on the environment and helps them to become greener in their daily lives. The show has been acclaimed as the first show of its type. Even in production, they reduce their impact on the earth by using hybrid cars, crew carpooling, and reusing props.

The series spawned versions in 15 countries outside of New Zealand. Wa$ted was also produced as a television show most notably in the United States, and also in Canada, Spain, Denmark, Portugal, and Malaysia.

== Format ==
Francesca and Tristan return the family's trash from the previous year at the beginning of the show. From there, they sort through the trash with the family to demonstrate what could have been recycled and the impact their trash is having on the environment. Taking into account rubbish, electricity, water, and transportation, an ecological footprint is calculated to show how much land it would take to provide the resources for their household. They also calculate how many tones of carbon dioxide the family would emit in a year, comparing it to the national average (in New Zealand its 2.5 tones per person per year).

Francesca and Tristan then help the family reduce their environmental impact. Recycling and food scrap systems are implemented and followed by dealing with heating, power consumption, water consumption, and transportation. This includes a section called Tristan's Test where Tristan tests their knowledge (usually the children) of what environment impact a simple task can do.

After completing the tasks of reducing the household impact, Francesca and Tristan leave for three weeks to watch how good the families are at using the new systems. They promise to project forward any savings the family makes in those three weeks for one year and give those savings back in cash. On their return, Francesca and Tristan reveal how much the family's household footprint and carbon dioxide emissions have been reduced. Francesca then opens a green bucket, containing the savings they would have produced over a year, and gives the cash to the family.

=== Differences in series 1 ===
In series 1 the carbon dioxide emissions and Tristan's test were not used.

== Episodes ==
Season	Episodes	Originally released	
Season	Episodes	First released	Last released
1	10	February 20, 2007	April 24, 2007
2	10	February 5, 2008	April 8, 2008

=== Series 1 ===
No.	Title	Group	Original release date
1	"Nappy Nightmare"	The Petelos	20 February 2007
The Petelos produce twice as much rubbish as most families, half of which comes from the youngest member of the family. They waste power and money on their dryer and Patrick spends three hours a day burning through precious petrol in a traffic gridlock. With the help from the WA$TED! team, the Petelos will save $1250 in household bills every year and reduce their household footprint from 33 to 22 times the size of their section - a reduction of a third. Even though Patrick only went by train two days out of five, if everyone made a reduction like him, the country would reduce its total carbon emissions by 15%.
2	"Country Living"	The Parrys	27 February 2007
Englishman Mike and air hostess Maxine recently relocated to the countryside for a clean, green life. However the WA$TED! team quickly discovers their lifestyle is anything but that: they throw out 97 bags of rubbish every six months, Mike commutes three hours each day to work and their beautiful villa holds some closet eco-crimes. With the help from the WA$TED! team, the Parrys will save $1200 in household bills every year (and another $280 once the solar kicks in) and reduce their household footprint from 130 to 87 times the size of their house. Although their footprint still sounds high, daily commuting from the country means their extra fuel usage will always have an increased impact on the environment.
3	"Wrap It Up"	The Weas	6 March 2007
It is the small things adding up to a big eco problem in the Wea family. Over six months the WA$TED team found almost 200 school lunches, 2,600 cigarettes, 216 packets of chewing gum and 180 metres of plastic wrap in the Wea’s trash. With the help from the WA$TED! team, the Weas will save $850 in household bills every year and reduce their household footprint from 21 to 15 times the size of their section.
4	"Nasty Nappies"	The Jinks	13 March 2007
The WA$TED team has just three weeks to stop home business owners Matt Simpson and Pippa Jinks from suffocating the planet with plastic packaging and toxic electronic waste, not to mention their excessive three baths a day and power use which is twice the national average. With the help from the WA$TED! team, the Jinks will save $1640 in household bills every year and reduce their household footprint from 33 to 20 times the size of their section.
5	"Water Waste"	Jocelyn	20 March 2007
The WA$TED team takes on a solo mum and her two boys who are wasting 24,000 litres of water every month, killing untold local plant and marine life and contributing to the 1.5 billion litres of waste water New Zealand is discharging into the environment every day. With the help of the WA$TED! team, Jocelyn and the boys will save $1050 in household bills every year and reduce their household footprint from 11 to 7 times the size of their section.
6	"Co-Eds"	Students	27 March 2007
It is back to school, as the WA$TED! team greens up a group of six university students who are creating almost a tonne of rubbish every six months, 90% of which could have avoided hitting the landfill. With the help from the WA$TED! team, the students will save $2200 in household bills every year and reduce their household footprint from 85 to 60 times the size of their section.
7	"Troublesome Trash"	The Crumps	3 April 2007
Barry Crump’s son, Martin and his family are in the environmental hot spot this week, exposed for not being at one with nature. They are illegally dumping rubbish, heating up the planet by buying food shipped from across the globe, and spending over $7,000 in power and gas bills every year. With help from the WA$TED! team, the Crumps will save $1325 in household bills every year and reduce their household footprint from 39 to 24 times the size of their section. A huge reduction which was mostly due to switching to a highly efficient heat source, but it could have been bigger had they put more effort into reducing their food miles.
8	"Up in Smoke"	Farmers	10 April 2007
The WA$TED team takes on four generations of farming traditions to make this dairy farm and its occupants more environmentally friendly. By burning their waste, Ritchie and Abbie are sending dangerous dioxins into air which is returning to their land and poisoning the soil they rely on for their livelihood. With help from the WA$TED! team, the farmers will save $1500 in household bills every year and reduce their household footprint from 154 to 101 times the size of their house.
9	"Sex & the City"	Roommates	17 April 2007
Material girls Patrina, Marjka and Kristy are blissfully unaware they are fast destroying their own material world. Not only do they turf out tonnes of takeaway trash and cosmetics packaging, but they are also living in a luxury, energy-zapping home - which is costing them $700 a month in power alone. With help from the WA$TED! team, the girls will save $1650 in household bills every year and reduce their household footprint from 92 to 58 times the size of their section.
10	"Lazy, Landfill Layabouts"	The Radichs	24 April 2007
The WA$TED team discovers the rubbishy Radichs recycling wrongs, food faults and nappy nightmare means they are creating 85% more rubbish than they should. This single income family is losing half their heating through the ceilings and floors leaving their teenage daughter’s room below 'World Health Organisation' recommended temperatures. With the help from the WA$TED! team, the Radich's will save $1500 in household bills every year and reduce their household footprint from 12 to 7 times the size of their section.

=== Series 2 ===
No. overall	No. in series	Title	Group	Original release date
11	1	TBA	The Staples	5 February 2008
DIY disaster Dave Staple is purchasing his way to environmental disaster. By driving the kids to school, using two inefficient motorboats and cleaning paintbrushes on the lawn, they are polluting the environment at an alarming rate. Luckily the WA$TED! team is here to green up their act and save them a load of cash. With the help of the WA$TED! team, the Staples Family will save $2,100 in household bills every year, reduce their household footprint from 18 to 8 times the size of their section and reduce their annual carbon dioxide emissions from 23 to 10 tonnes.
12	2	TBA	The Browns	12 February 2008
Dad, George is fixated on saving money goes to extremes to save power around the home, but he needs to learn to use a carrot rather than a stick to convince the rest of the family. The Browns are busily blowing their budget and the planet with their red meat feasts, appliance wars and daily trips to the laundromat. The WA$TED! team is going to teach them how to work as a team to save money and bring their footprint down. With the help from the WA$TED! team, the Brown Family will save $1,950 in household bills every year, reduce their household footprint from 24 to 19 times the size of their section and reduce their annual carbon dioxide emissions from 15 to 13 tonnes.
13	3	TBA	The Blair-Hunts	19 February 2008
This family of six is rubbishing the land they inherited from their ancestors. Tarati cooks feasts of unsustainable fish for the whanau while Patrick drives to work on the other side of town in his gas guzzling V6. Their damp house needs sorting out and their plans for an energy zapping new bathroom must be stopped if the Blair-Hunts want to reduce their already huge household footprint. With the help from the WA$TED! team, the Blair-Hunt Family will save $1,500 in household bills every year, reduce their household footprint from 28 to 22 times the size of their section and reduce their annual carbon dioxide emissions from 20 to 16 tonnes.
14	4	TBA	Nicky & James Ogilvie	26 February 2008
This couple is living the high life with two incomes and no kids. But this lifestyle is managing to punish the planet like a family of four with their extravagant yet ineffective heating, pooping pooch and regular air flights to exotic locations. Nicky and James need to stop their lifestyle focused on the now and start thinking about the future. With the help of the WA$TED! team, Nicky and James will save $1,500 in household bills every year, reduce their household footprint from 21 to 9 times the size of their section and reduce their annual carbon dioxide emissions down to the national average from 10 to 5 tonnes.
15	5	TBA	The Cleaves	4 March 2008
Cromwell family, the Cleaves come from a century old farming heritage, but their dump hole tradition is having a toxic impact on the very land they live on. It is time for these Southerners to upgrade their habits and home to stay warmer, save money and reduce their impact on the planet. With the help of the WA$TED! team, the Cleave Family will save $1,350 in household bills every year, reduce their household footprint from 110 to 88 times the size of their house and reduce their annual carbon dioxide emissions from 28 to 24 tonnes. Still high for a family this size because of their need to drive into the city each day.
16	6	TBA	The Reed Brothers	11 March 2008
These sporty brothers may be keeping their bodies toned and healthy, but at a big cost to the environment. Their exercise regime churns through mountains of single-use supplements including bottled water, muesli bars and glucose shots that all end up on the roadside. The WA$TED! team are teaching these litter bugs how to adapt to eco apartment living and that going green could be the way to a woman’s heart. With the help of the WA$TED! team, the Reed Brothers will save $2,450 in household bills every year, reduce their household footprint from 154 to 120 times the size of their house and reduce their annual carbon dioxide emissions from 10 to 8 tonnes (still over the national average).
17	7	TBA	The Tavais	18 March 2008
Olivia and Junior want to give their kids the best but their suburban home, piles of toys and overuse of chemical cleaning products may be doing more harm than good. Junior spends longer finding a park outside his work than it takes him to drive there and his fetish for lamps is costing them serious cash. It is time to teach the Tavais plastic is not fantastic and give them an appreciation for nature. With the help from the WA$TED! team, the Tavai Family will save $2,500 in household bills every year, reduce their household footprint from 13 to 5 times the size of their section and reduce their annual carbon dioxide emissions from 9 to 3 tonnes - only just over the average for one person.
18	8	TBA	The Becks	25 March 2008
Truck driver Kevin works hard to give his family the good things in life but their food waste, outrageous energy use and gas guzzling jobs and hobbies are cranking the carbon. Their motorboat, big cars, multiple televisions and freezers add to annual carbon dioxide emissions three times the national average. It is time for the Beck family to rethink their transport options and give up a few of the extravagances in their life. With the help from the WA$TED! team, the Beck Family will save $2,870 in household bills every year, reduce their household footprint from 25 to 21 times the size of their section and reduce their annual carbon dioxide emissions from 30 to 25 tonnes.
19	9	TBA	The Young Professionals	1 April 2008
New Zealand’s answer to "Friends", Sarah, Jarin, Erica & Alanna think its up to someone else to save the planet. They throw out half a tonne of food every year costing them $8,000, and spend even more on clothes. It is time to turn these frivolous shopaholics into thrifty eco warriors. With the help of the WA$TED! team, the Young Professionals will save $2,500 in household bills every year, reduce their household footprint from 30 to 17 times the size of their section and reduce their annual carbon dioxide emissions from 9 to 5 tonnes - half the national average.
20	10	TBA	The Kayes	8 April 2008
The Kaye family recently moved from Australia bringing their bad habits with them. They use more water bathing each day than the typical NZ household goes through for all their water needs. They waste power leaving their spa pool on 24/7 and Vicky has some interesting power sucking techniques to drown out Michael’s snoring every night. It is time to show these Aussie wasters how to become clean green Kiwis. With the help of the WA$TED! team, the Kaye Family will save $2,000 in household bills every year, reduce their household footprint from 17 to 8 times the size of their section and reduce their annual carbon dioxide emissions from 14 to 5 tonnes.

== Awards and nominations ==
- Best Observational Format - FRAPA/C21 Format Awards 2007
- Supreme Energywise & Residential Award - EECA 2007
- Green Ribbon Award - MfE 2007
- Best Innovation - Sustainable Business Network 2007
