= Baby Done =

2020 film

- Film poster
- Directed by: Curtis Vowell
- Written by: Sophie Henderson
- Produced by: Morgan Waru
- Starring: Rose Matafeo; Matthew Lewis
- Cinematography: Ian McCarroll
- Edited by: Richard Shaw
- Music by: Amine Ramer
- Distributed by: Madman Entertainment & Piki Films
- Release date: 22 October 2020
- Running time: 91 minutes
- Country: New Zealand
- Language: English

Baby Done is a 2020 New Zealand comedy film directed by Curtis Vowell, and executive produced by Taika Waititi, written by Sophie Henderson, and starring Rose Matafeo and Matthew Lewis.

== Plot ==
Zoe is a young woman who discovers she's pregnant. But, acting in denial, she tries to live a wild single life before the baby arrives. Her boyfriend, Tim, has the opposite reaction to the baby news and goes into nesting mode.

== Cast ==
- Rose Matafeo as Zoe
- Matthew Lewis as Tim
- Nic Sampson as Brian
- Emily Barclay as Molly
- Alice Snedden as Antenatal teacher
- Guy Montgomery as Treemasters Official

== Production ==
Married couple Henderson and Vowell made the semi-autobiographical film out of their own fear of growing old and settling down.

== Release ==
The film premiered in Australia and New Zealand on 22 October 2020. It was later released in the UK and Ireland on 22 January 2021.

== Reception ==
The Guardian praised "Matafeo’s wonderful, compulsively affable performance is core to the film’s irresistible good naturedness: its spirit, pluck, bounce." On review aggregator website Rotten Tomatoes, the film holds an approval rating of 92% based on 39 reviews, with an average rating of 6.9/10. The site's critical consensus reads, "A lightly humorous look at impending parenthood, Baby Done finds laughs -- and moments of genuine honesty -- in a life-altering event."
