= Grand Cheval Productions =

Film production company in New Zealand

Grand Cheval Productions is an Auckland, New Zealand based film and television production company. In 2011 Grand Cheval won the 48HOURS Film Competition for their film The Child Jumpers.
