= Coco Solid =

New Zealand rapper and writer (born 1979)

- Born: Jessica Hansell; 1979 (age 46–47); Auckland, New Zealand
- Genres: Electroclash, electronica, hip hop
- Occupations: Singer, songwriter, director, producer, rapper, novelist
- Instruments: Vocals, keyboard
- Years active: 2003–present
- Label: Independent
- Website: www.cocosolid.com

Coco Solid (born Jessica Hansell in 1979) is a singer, songwriter, director, producer and novelist. She is of Māori, Pacific and German heritage. Her musical style is a mixture of hip hop, disco and electronica. She created the animated television series Aroha Bridge.

== Biography ==
Coco Solid was born in 1979 in Auckland, New Zealand. Solid has a master's degree from the International Institute of Modern Letters at Victoria University of Wellington. Her thesis was titled Chaos Theory is for Lovers. Solid worked with Erik Ultimate (Benjamin Buchanan) over her first five albums, touring to the US and Europe and attending SXSW.

Solid's work was named in the top 10 albums of 2005, 2006 and 2007 in The Sunday Star-Times, The Listener and on Radio New Zealand National. New York rapper Princess Superstar covered the hook of "Denim & Leather" in her song "Monday Morning".

Solid's single "Crimefighters" received the New Zealand college radio BNet Award for "Best Hip Hop Track" award in 2007. It also reached No. 1 on the BNet charts. Solid and Erik Ultimate rapped with Kiwi group Flight of the Conchords at SXSW 2006. The performance was posted on YouTube and had received over 500,000 views by 2019.

Solid and Erik Ultimate have supported Girl Talk, Avenue D, The 5.6.7.8's and King Brothers in NZ. Overseas, Solid has rapped alongside Sway, TTC, O'mmas Keith from Sa-Ra, Spankrock and The Rogers Sisters.

Solid received the APRA Professional Development Award for song-writing in March 2009.

She completed a ten-date tour to Mexico, New York, Berlin, Cologne, Lisbon, Porto and Tokyo in March and April 2009.

Solid released a mix tape on cassette called Pacific Rims, which includes the singles "I'll see you inside" (with Pepepe from Mexico) and "Architecture" (with longtime collaborator Jizmatron), which stayed on the benet charts for months.

Solid released her debut novel, How to Loiter In a Turf War, in May 2022.

== Artistic projects ==
Solid is in a duo called Parallel Dance Ensemble with Denmark hip-hop producer Robin Hannibal (from Owusu & Hannibal) after meeting him at the 2008 Red Bull Music Academy. The duo released a 12" and digital EP on 25 March 2011 on German label Permanent Vacation. The first single, "Shopping Cart", was No. 1 on Radio Active for four weeks and was tweeted by Gilles Peterson. "Juices" also hit the charts in 2011.

Solid is part of four piece grunge band Badd Energy, which was signed to Flying Nun Records in 2011.

Solid features on other producers' tracks, most recently with Lorenz Rhode on German Label Exploited Records.

Solid is part of Piki Films Māori Pasifika film collective, which she describes as "a bunch of writers who cross-contaminate each other's work".

She leads Kuini Qontrol, which is an artistic online project about political topics with a focus on the South Pacific.

=== Aroha Bridge ===
Solid created, wrote and directed the animated television series Aroha Bridge. The series began as a comic strip, Hook Ups, published in the New Zealand music magazine Volume. The first season of Aroha Bridge was launched online in 2013, with season two in 2019.

== Discography ==
=== Albums ===
- Rap N Roll (2003)
- Denim & Leather (2004)
- Erik Ultimate presents Denim & Leisure (2005)
- Gentlemen Prefer Bombz (2006)
- The Radical Bad Attack (2008)
- Parallel Dance Ensemble (2009)
- Possessions & Obsessions (2011)
- Pacific Rims (2011)
- Possessions & Obsessions Remixed (2012)
- Underwater Pyramids by Badd Energy (2013)

=== Records ===
- Graffiti Girls 4 Life (2008)
- Parallel Dance Ensemble (2009)
- Run (2010)
- Possessions & Obsessions (2011)
- Possessions & Obsessions Remixed (2012)
- Underwater Pyramids by Badd Energy (2013)

== Awards ==
2019 New Zealand Arts Foundation Laureate

2018 Fulbright-Creative New Zealand Pacific Writer's Residency

2009 APRA Professional Development Awards
