= We Were Dangerous =

2024 New Zealand-American drama film

- Official artwork
- Directed by: Josephine Stewart-Te Whiu
- Screenplay by: Maddie Dai
- Produced by: Morgan Waru; Polly Fryer
- Starring: Rima Te Wiata; Erana James; Nathalie Morris; Manaia Hall
- Cinematography: María Inés Manchego
- Edited by: Hansjörg Weißbrich; Richard Shaw
- Music by: Cam Ballantyne
- Production companies: Piki Films; Fit Via Vi
- Distributed by: REASON8; Madman Entertainment
- Release dates: 8 March 2024 (SXSW); 22 August 2024 (New Zealand)
- Running time: 82 minutes
- Countries: New Zealand; United States
- Language: English

We Were Dangerous is a 2024 New Zealand drama film, directed by Josephine Stewart-Te Whiu, in her directorial debut, from a screenplay by Maddie Dai. It stars Rima Te Wiata, Erana James, Nathalie Morris and Manaia Hall. Taika Waititi and Carthew Neal serve as executive producers.

It had its world premiere at South by Southwest on 8 March 2024. The film was released in New Zealand on 22 August 2024.

== Plot summary ==
In 1954, Māori teenage girl Nellie is sent by her family to Christchurch to live with a relative after her hometown's meatworks closes down. Unable to find her relative, Nellie befriends another female Māori teenager named Daisy, who has escaped several foster homes after experiencing abuse. After being arrested for shoplifting, the two girls are sent to the Te Motu School for Incorrigible and Delinquent Girls. The Matron, a devout Māori woman who had grown up in a Christian orphanage, attempts to reprogram the girls into subservient housewives and mothers. The Matron believes that the British brought Christianity to civilise the Māori people.

Nellie and Daisy attempt to escape the reform school with another girl named Pauline but are captured. At the advice of a government official, the Matron relocates the entire reform school to a former leper colony on a remote island. Nellie and Daisy are joined by the European teenager Lou, the daughter of a respected Christchurch doctor. Lou was sent to Te Motu after her father caught her having a sexual encounter with her female mathematics tutor. The three girls are assigned to share a rickety hut and become friends.

On the island, the Matron continues her reprogramming efforts which are laced with Christian religious instruction, housework, and various chores. The Matron also suppresses Nellie and Daisy's expression of Māori culture and punishes them for leading their peers in a rock and roll dance. In the midst of the Matron's authoritarian rule, the girls befriend the kindly Barry, the island groundskeeper who introduces them to a hut that was inhabited by a Chinese leper, who died on the island decades ago.

With the girls proving resistant to the Matron's reprogramming efforts, she enlists the help of a doctor who performs forced sterilisation on two girls at a medical hut. Lou attempts to warn her father about the destructive surgeries but her letter is intercepted by the matron. Following the disappearances, Nellie and Daisy seek to escape the island but unexpectedly find themselves at odds with Lou, who is seemingly afraid to break the rules. Lou also appears to embrace the Matron's Christian teachings and programme.

When Nellie stands up to the Matron for punishing Daisy for not being able to read, Lou slaps Nellie and punishes her by splashing with water. However, Lou's apparent reformed behaviour is later revealed to be a ruse to distract the Matron while she, Nellie and Daisy plot to burn down the medical hut and gather supplies to build a raft to escape the island. Later that night, the trio set fire to the medical hut, destroying the operating theatre. While the Matron and other staff are preoccupied, the three girls escape the island on their improvised raft. The film ends with Nellie, Daisy and Lou sailing into the sunrise.

== Cast ==
- Rima Te Wiata as the Matron
- Erana James as Nellie
- Nathalie Morris as Louisa
- Manaia Hall as Daisy
- Stephen Tamarapa as Barry

== Production ==
We Were Dangerous was executive produced Taika Waititi, directed by Josephine Stewart-Te Whiu, written by Maddie Dai and produced by Morgan Waru and Polly Fryer. The film was the feature debut of both Te Whiu and Dai.

=== Writing and conception ===
The film's screenplay was written by Maddie Dai. Dai created the three protagonists and drew upon inspiration and ideas from the experiences of her great-great-grandfather who was imprisoned on an island in New Zealand, New Zealand author Maurice Gee's novel Live Bodies, the eugenicist William Chapple's The Fertility of the Unfit book, the Mazengarb Report and the Royal Commission of Inquiry into Abuse in Care. Dai also researched New Zealand's eugenics movement and hysteria accusations around young women during the 20th century. During an interview with Variety, Dai described We Were Dangerous as an escape film about teenage girls "that really championed their friendships and had a lot of joy in it, in spite of all this dark historical context."

Dai also collaborated with Stewart-Te Whiu and Waru in developing the screenplay. Stewart-Te Whiu and Waru's involvement with the project was motivated by the themes of female bodily autonomy and freedom from societal restrictions. Dai said that the film also sought to grapple with the themes of British colonialism, institutionalisation and the dichotomy between power and privilege. Stewart-Te Whiu's interest in the project was influenced by the experiences of her father in state care schools, which influenced the film's reform school setting.

Lake Alice Hospital survivor Leonie McInroe also consulted the creative team on the development of the screenplay.

=== Casting ===
Erana James, Nathalie Morris and Manaia Hall were cast as the three teenage protagonists Nellie, Lou and Daisy. Auditioning for the teenage cast members were conducted across New Zealand. To build trust between the three lead cast members, the crew played trust games with James, Morris and Hall during rehearsals. The actors did a lot of improvisation for their scenes during rehearsals and avoided rehearsing scenes in the script to avoid "mechanical or robotic" performances during filming.

Hall, who is of Ngāi Tūhoe, Ngāti Manawa, Ngāti Pukenga descent, was selected for the role of Daisy at the age of 12. This was her first leading role in a film. Hall described her character Daisy as energetic, lively, humorous and "naive but smart in her own way."

Rima Te Wiata was cast as the antagonistic Matron, with Te-Whiu describing her casting as an "obvious choice, really." To reinforce the antagonistic relationship between the Matron and the teenage protagonists, Te-Whiu kept Te Wiata separate from the girls during rehearsals.

The supporting female cast members were local teenagers from Christchurch, many of whom had not acted before.

=== Filming ===
María Inés Manchego served as cinematographer. Filming took place on Ōtamahua / Quail Island and the Banks Peninsula near Christchurch. The film's cinematography was inspired by the work of Japanese photographer Osamu Yokonami.

One impromptu scene involved the girls at the reformatory chanting and singing in Māori against a faded picture of Queen Elizabeth II and a sign stating "English Only." While the scene was not part of the script, Stewart-Te Whiu decided to include it in the film since the actors were performing with high energy during a warm-up session.

=== Post-production ===
The film's soundtrack was composed by Cam Ballantyne. The film production also utilised the services of eight Unitec drama school students and Reb Fountain for performing the soundtrack. In line with the film's theme of bodily treatment and autonomy, the drama students also performed the film's percussive elements.

The film was edited by German editor Hansjörg Weißbrich, whom Stewart-Te Whiu hired "because he was not affiliated at all with the politics of our [New Zealand] filmmaking, and just stayed character-focused and story-focused."

== Release ==
The film had its world premiere at South by Southwest on 8 March 2024. It also screened at BFI Flare: London LGBTIQ+ Film Festival on 21 March 2024. The film's New Zealand premiere was at the launch of the New Zealand International Film Festival on 31 July 2024 in Wellington.

Madman Entertainment and Piki Films distributed the film in New Zealand and Australia. The film was released in New Zealand on 22 August 2024. International sales outside of North America, Australian and New Zealand are handled by London-based REASON8.

== Reception ==
=== Critical reception ===
On the review aggregator website Rotten Tomatoes, 91% of 11 critics' reviews are positive, with an average rating of 6.80/10.

David Ehrlich of IndieWire gave a mixed review, awarding the film a B minus. Ehrlich described the film as "a hopeful — sometimes borderline exuberant — rallying cry for girls to stick together across the various divides that people use to disempower them." He praised the performance of the main cast members Erana James, Nathalie Morris and Manaia Hall as well as the executive producer Taika Waititi and director Josephine Stewart-Te Whiu. Ehrlich was critical of the film's pacing and the lack of in-depth exploration into the story's social fabric.

Cinefied's review praised Maddie Dai's screenplay for weaving a story of teenage girlhood friendship with the themes of indigenous peoples resisting colonisation and Christianisation. The review also praised Stewart-Te Whiu's directorship and the performances of James, Morris and Hall but acknowledged that some story ideas were not developed due to the story's short runtime. The review also praised cinematographer Maria Ines Manchengo for capturing the female-centric theme of the film.

Alex Casey of The Spinoff gave the film a positive review, describing it as "a soaring celebration of misfits and girlhood." She praised Dai and Stewart-Te Whiu for balancing the film's grim reform school setting with a fun, uplifting and joyous "coming of age" caper story. She praised the performances of the lead trio James, Morris and Hall while crediting Rima Te Wiata for bringing "glimmers of humanity and doubt" to the antagonistic Matron. She also praised Stephen Tamarapa's performance as the bumbling caretaker Barry. Casey also praised the quality of the costumes and set designs for creating the film's 1954 setting.

James Croot of The Press gave the film a positive review, describing it as a "Kiwi cross between The Magdalene Sisters and The Shawshank Redemption." He awarded the film four stars. Croot praised Stewart-Te Whiu's directorship and Dai's historical research into institutional care and eugenics when developing the script. He also praised the performances of Te Wiata, James, Morris and Hall.

Tom Peters of the World Socialist Web Site gave the film a more negative review, criticising the "jarringly upbeat and optimistic ending" and the "simplistic" story of female solidarity. He described the film as a "missed opportunity" because it "shies away from depicting the extent of the brutality that occurred in such facilities and the lifelong trauma inflicted on the young people."

=== Awards ===
Special Jury Award for Filmmaking 2024, South by Southwest film festival, USA

Best Pasifika Film 2024 Hawaii International Film Festival, USA

Best Youth Film 2024 SCHLINGEL International Film Festival in Chemnitz, Germany

Best Narrative Feature 2024, Kerry International Film Festival, Ireland

Best Women Series Film 2024, San Diego International Film Festival, USA

== See also ==
- Cinema of New Zealand
