= Piki Films =

New Zealand film production company

- Type: Private
- Industry: Motion pictures, television
- Founders: Taika Waititi; Carthew Neal
- Headquarters: Auckland, New Zealand
- Products: Film; Television shows
- Website: pikifilms.com

Piki Films is a New Zealand film and video production and distributing company based in Auckland. The name "Piki" means "jump" or "climb over" in the Māori language.

== History ==
Piki Films was founded by cofounders Taika Waititi and Carthew Neal.

== Productions ==
=== Film ===
Year	Name	Director	Notes	Ref
2016	Hunt for the Wilderpeople	Taika Waititi		
2018	FafswagVogue.com	Tanu Gago	Documentary featurette	
2018	The Breaker Upperers	Madeleine Sami, Jackie van Beek		
2019	Jojo Rabbit	Taika Waititi		
2020	Baby Done	Curtis Vowell		
2023	Red, White & Brass	Damon Fepulea'i		
2024	We Were Dangerous	Josephine Stewart-Te Whiu		
2024	The Mountain	Rachel House		
2026	Klara and the Sun	Taika Waititi		

=== Television ===
Year	Name	Creators	Notes	Ref
2013–2019	Aroha Bridge	Jessica Hansell, Simon Ward		
2021–2023	Reservation Dogs	Sterlin Harjo, Taika Waititi		
2022–2023	Our Flag Means Death	David Jenkins		
2024	Time Bandits	Jemaine Clement, Iain Morris, Taika Waititi		
