= Red, White & Brass =

2023 New Zealand film

- Directed by: Damon Fepulea'i
- Written by: Damon Fepulea'i; Halaifonua Finau
- Produced by: Georgina Conder; Halaifonua Finau; Morgan Waru
- Starring: John-Paul Foliaki; Dimitrius Schuster-Koloamatangi
- Cinematography: Andrew McGeorge
- Edited by: Damon Fepulea'i; Paul Maxwell; Ben Powdrell
- Production companies: Piki Films; Miss Conception Films
- Distributed by: Piki Films; Madman Entertainment
- Release date: 23 March 2023
- Running time: 85 minutes
- Country: New Zealand
- Languages: English; Tongan
- Box office: $2,000,000

Red, White & Brass is a 2023 New Zealand comedy film directed by Damon Fepulea'i, and starring John-Paul Foliaki and Dimitrius Schuster-Koloamatangi in his film debut.

== Plot ==
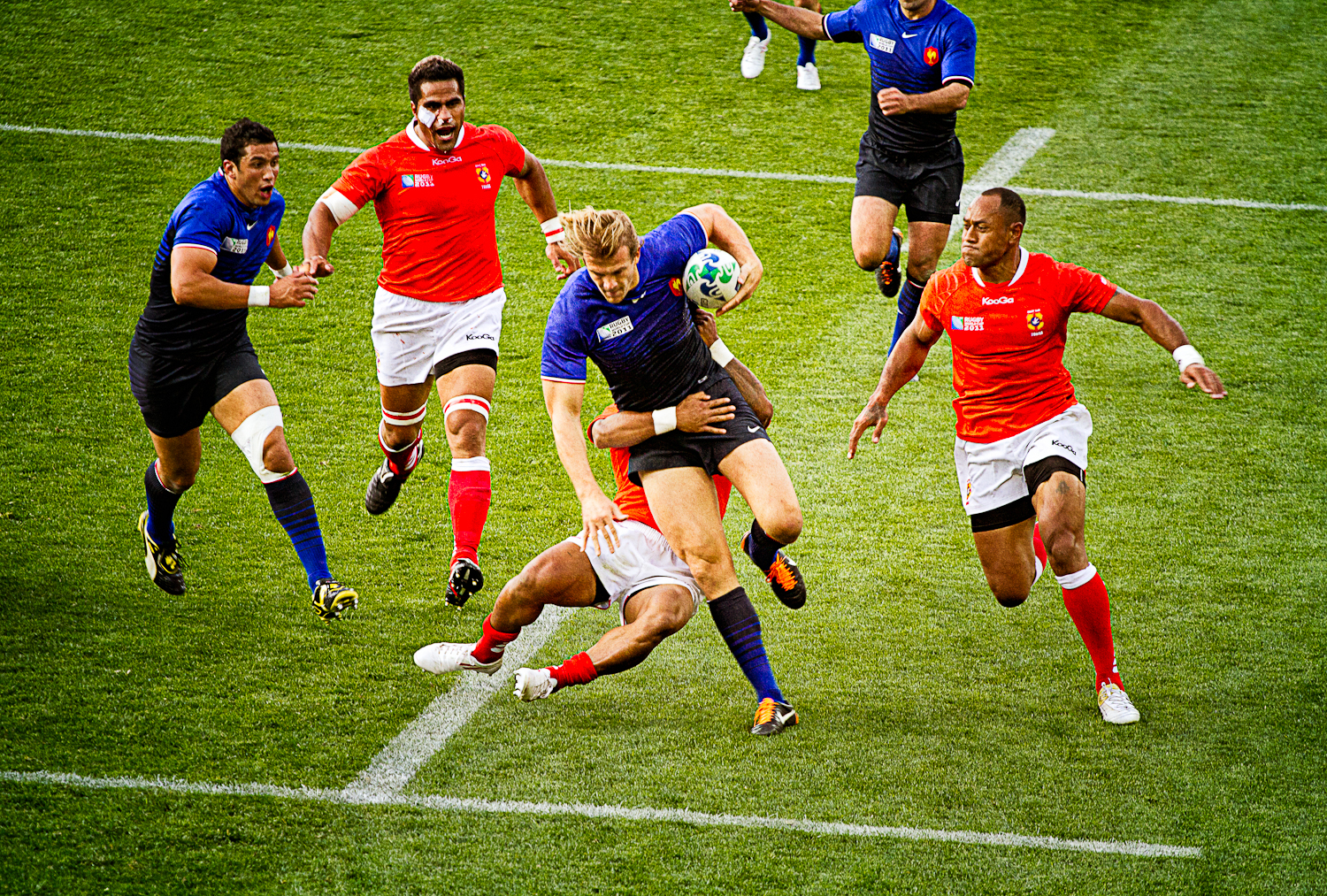
The Tonga v France match at Regional Stadium, Wellington on 1 October 2011

The film centres around Tongan New Zealander rugby fan Maka, who is seeking to get tickets to attend the 2011 Rugby World Cup's Tonga versus France game in Wellington on 1 October 2011. Maka frequently clashes with his successful cousin Veni, who has aspirations of climbing the social ladder and regards Maka as a loser. Following a church fundraising effort, Maka buys fake tickets from a local criminal. Though Maka's mother manages to recover the funds, they are too late to buy the tickets for the match.

Still determined to watch the Tonga versus France match, Maka comes up with the idea of creating a brass band to perform during the pre-match entertainment. However, the band does not exist, and Maka has four weeks to create the band. Despite the disapproval of his conservative church minister father and the Tongan community elders, Maka forms an impromptu band consisting of Veni, his father, his cousin and several church members. Maka also enlists the help of a recent Tongan migrant, who was formerly part of a brass band, and a local Pakeha music teacher, to help train the band and acquire musical instruments respectively.

With the help of Aroha, a Māori woman who works for the Wellington City Council, Maka secures an audition for the brass band to represent the Tongan community at the pre-match entertainment. However, Maka botches the audition when he attempts to incorporate some modern hip-hop moves into the performance, resulting the City Council rejecting the group's application to perform. Footage of the botched audition is circulated on social media, causing embarrassment to the Tongan community and elders.

Despite this setback, Maka manages to convince Aroha and the City Council to reconsider their decision by staging an impromptu performance by the brass band. Though the Tongan community's elders are opposed to the brass band participating at the Tongan versus France match, Maka's father manages to convince them to agree to a compromise where Maka's team will perform a traditional Tongan hymn. Maka's band also receives help from the Tongan community, who manufacture red costumes for them.

On the day of the France versus Tonga match, Maka and his brass band initially play their traditional hymn but incorporate modern hip-hop moves. Their performance is well received by the spectators and Tongan community. The post-credit blurb mentions that Tonga beat France during the match by a margin of 19 to 14.

== Cast ==
- John-Paul Foliaki as Maka
- Dimitrius Schuster-Koloamatangi as Veni
- Ilaisaane Green as Irene
- Hariata Moriarty as Aroha
- Suzy Cato as music teacher

== Production ==
Red, White & Brass was directed by Damon Fepulea'i, and was based on true events. Producer Halaifonua Finau was inspired to write the screenplay for the film in 2016.

The film's soundtrack was performed by Three Houses Down.

== Release ==
Red, White & Brass premiered at the Embassy Theatre, Wellington on 21 March 2023, before receiving a wide-release in New Zealand on 23 March 2023. The film was shown at the Hawaii International Film Festival on 1 April 2023, and was announced as one of the early picks for the 2023 Sydney Film Festival. The film received a theatrical release in Australia on 22 June 2023. The film also played LA Asian Pacific Film Festival – Winner Special Jury Mention Narrative Feature (Damon Fepulea’i, Halaifonua (Nua) Finau), IFI Family Festival Dublin, Jecheon International Music & Film Festival, Atlantic International Film Festival, Port Townsend Film Festival (winning Audience Choice Best Narrative Feature), & Lost Weekend Film Festival.

During its first week, Red, White & Brass debuted at number two at the New Zealand Box Office.

The film was New Zealand's number 1 local film in 2023 at the Box Office.

== Reception ==
Isaac Chen of The New Zealand Herald awarded the film 5 out of 5 stars opening its review with, "Red, White & Brass is a beautifully crafted story with plenty of heart and plenty of laughs."

Graeme Tuckett of Stuff awarded the film four out of five stars, describing it as "pretty much the definition of a feel-good film." He praised the performance of the cast members particularly John-Paul Foliaki, Mikey Falesiu, Dimitrius Schuster-Koloamatangi, and Ilaisaane Green.

Simon Morris of Radio New Zealand praised the film for its exploration of Tongan New Zealand culture and society.

== Stage production ==
It was announced by Auckland Theatre Company it would produce a stage version of Red, White & Brass in association with Piki Films and Miss Conception Productions in its 2024 season with script penned by Leki Jackson-Bourke who has an additional writing credit on the film, and directed by Anapela Polataivao and Vela Manusaute. Many of the original cast from the film will return.
