= 2010 in New Zealand =

- Decades: 1990s; 2000s; 2010s; 2020s
- See also: History of New Zealand; List of years in New Zealand; Timeline of New Zealand history

The following lists events that happened during 2010 in New Zealand.

== Population ==
- Estimated population as of 31 December: 4,373,900.
- Increase since 31 December 2009: 41,700 (0.96%).
- Males per 100 Females: 95.7.

== Incumbents ==
=== Regal and vice-regal ===
- Head of State – Elizabeth II
- Governor-General – Sir Anand Satyanand
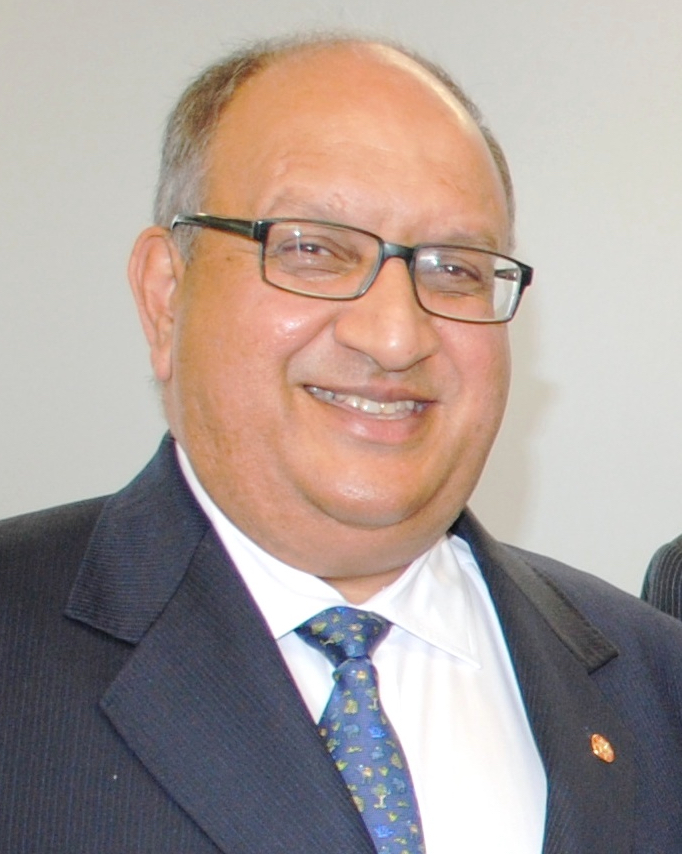
Sir Anand Satyanand

=== Government ===
2010 was the second full year of the 49th Parliament.

- Speaker of the House – Lockwood Smith
- Prime Minister – John Key
- Deputy Prime Minister – Bill English
- Minister of Finance – Bill English
- Minister of Foreign Affairs – Murray McCully
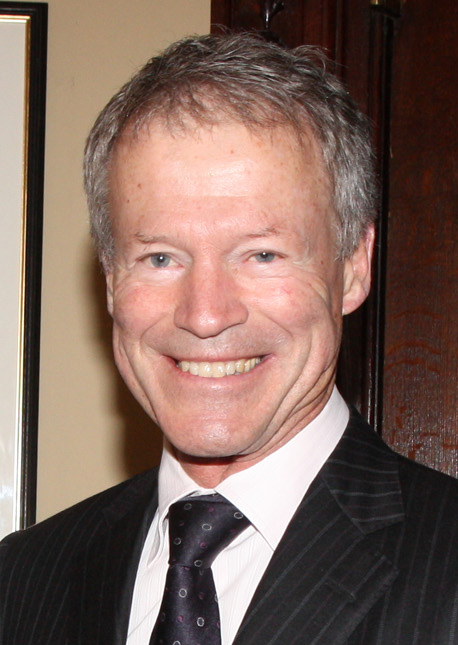
Lockwood Smith

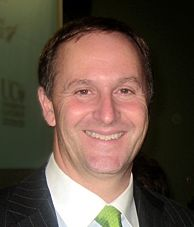
John Key

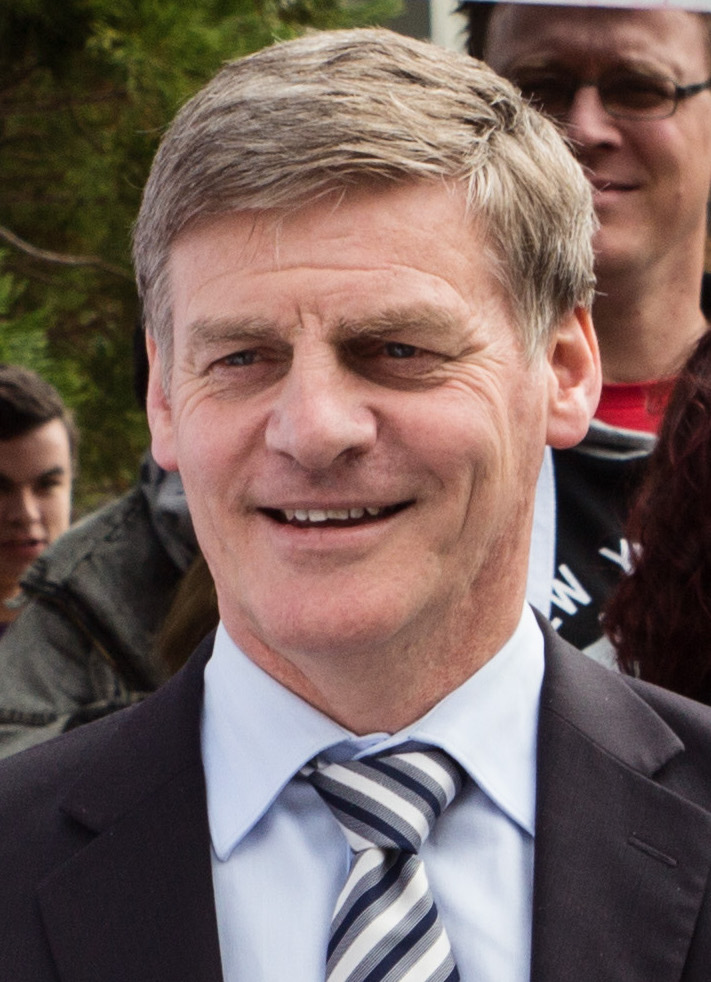
Bill English

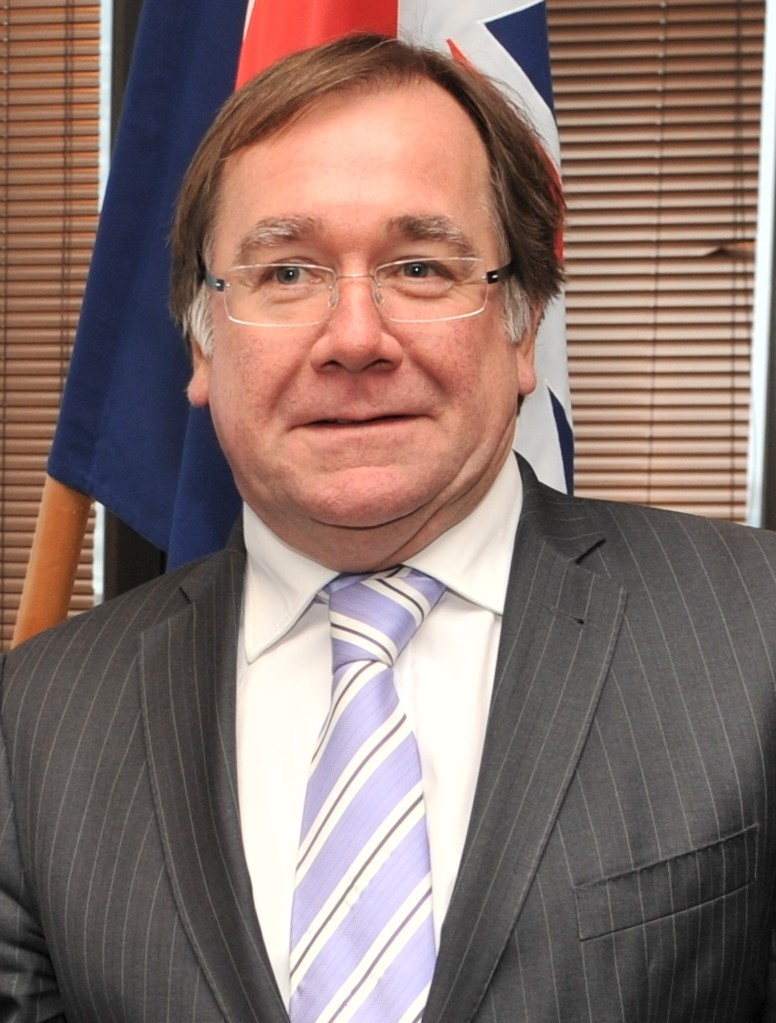
Murray McCully

=== Other party leaders ===
- Labour – Phil Goff (Leader of the Opposition)
- Act – Rodney Hide, since 13 June 2004
- Greens – Metiria Turei (since 30 May 2009) and Russel Norman (since 3 June 2006)
- Māori Party – Tariana Turia and Pita Sharples
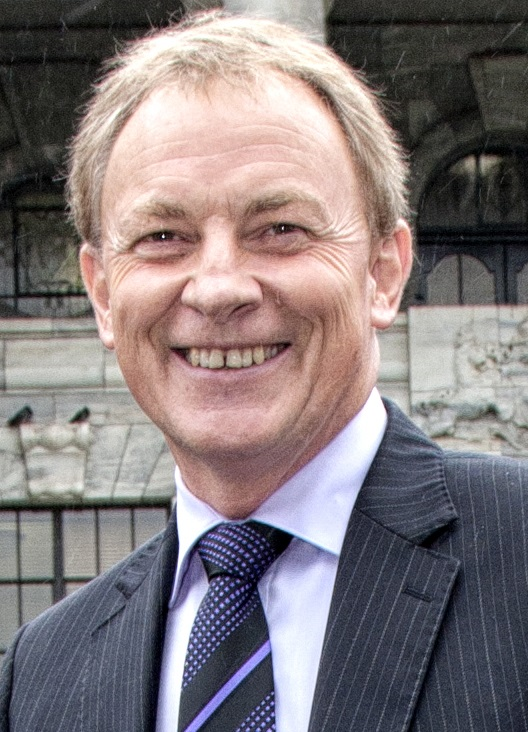
Phil Goff

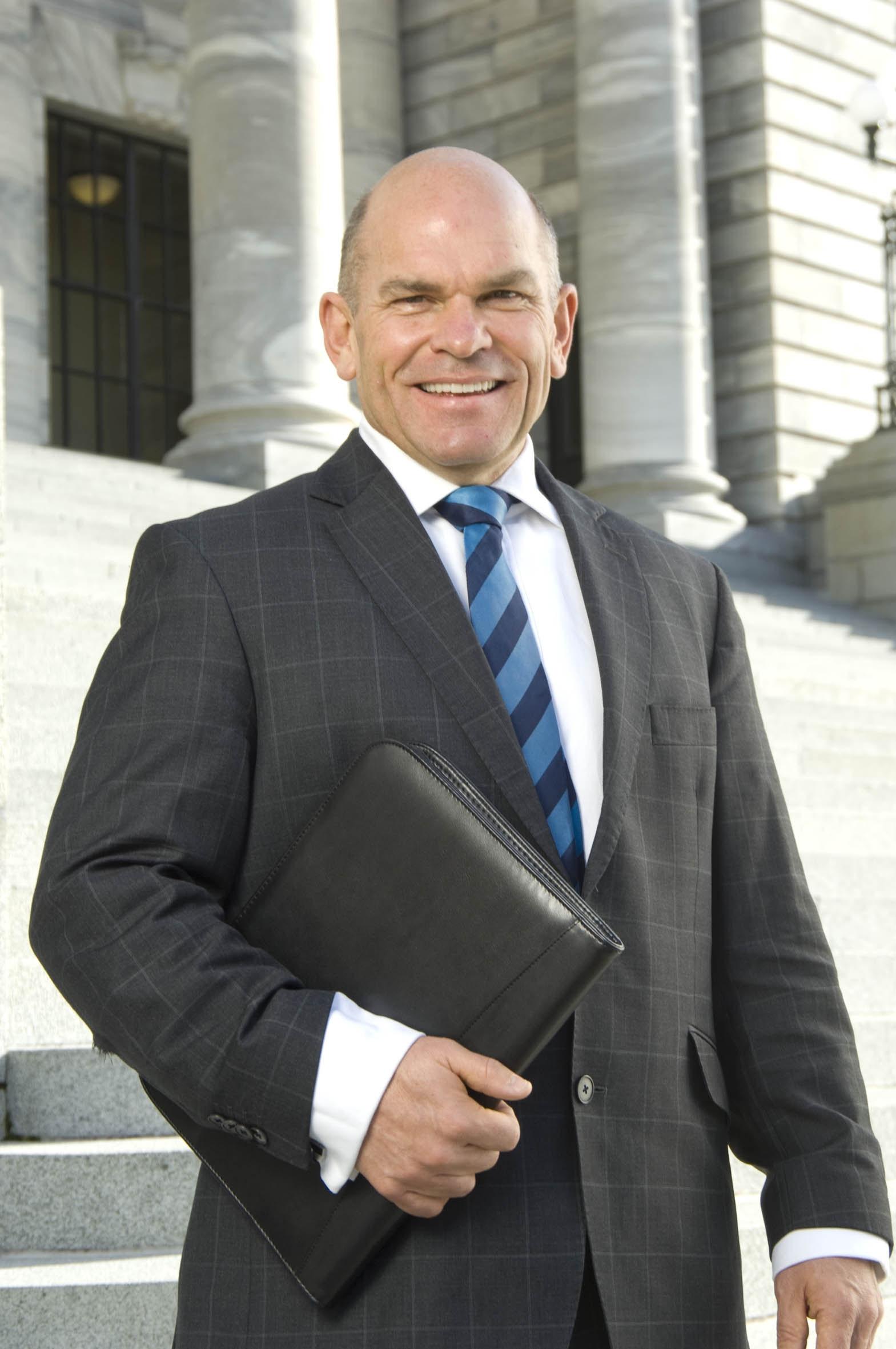
Rodney Hide

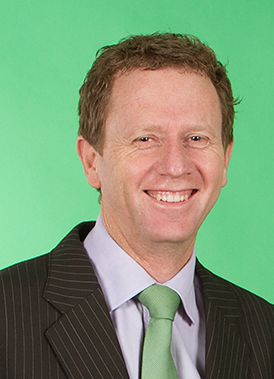
Russel Norman

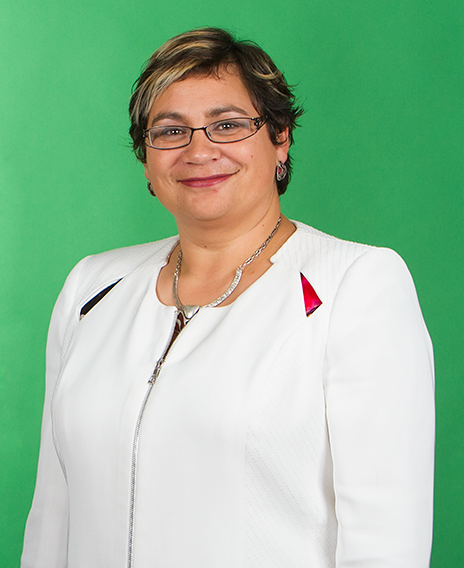
Metiria Turei

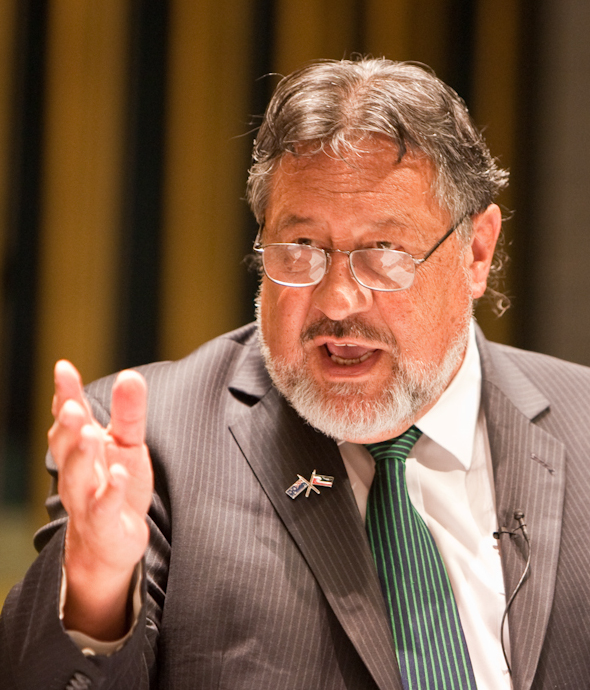
Pita Sharples

=== Judiciary ===
- Chief Justice — Sian Elias
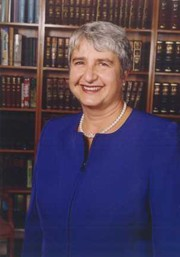
Dame Sian Elias

=== Main centre leaders ===
- Mayor of Auckland – John Banks since October 2007, followed by Len Brown for the Auckland super city
- Mayor of Tauranga – Stuart Crosby, since October 2004
- Mayor of Hamilton – Bob Simcock since May 2007, followed by Julie Hardaker in October 2010
- Mayor of Wellington – Kerry Prendergast since October 2001, followed by Celia Wade-Brown in October 2010
- Mayor of Christchurch – Bob Parker, since October 2007
- Mayor of Dunedin – Peter Chin succeeded by Dave Cull
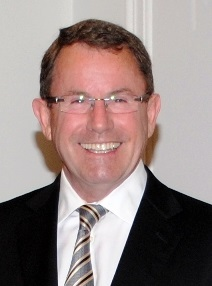
John Banks

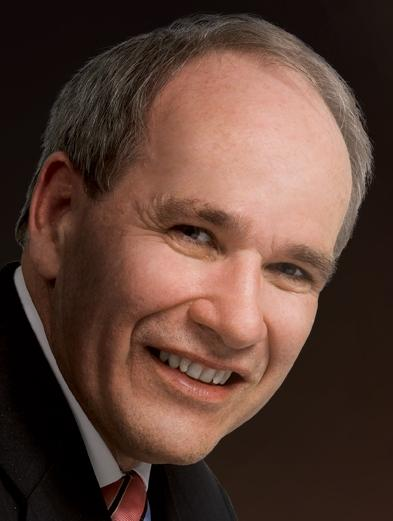
Len Brown

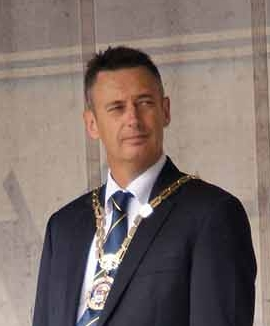
Stuart Crosby

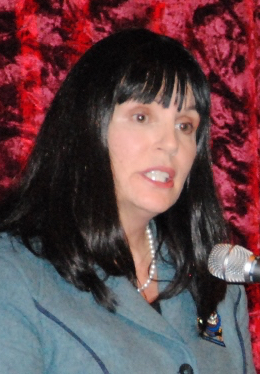
Julie Hardaker

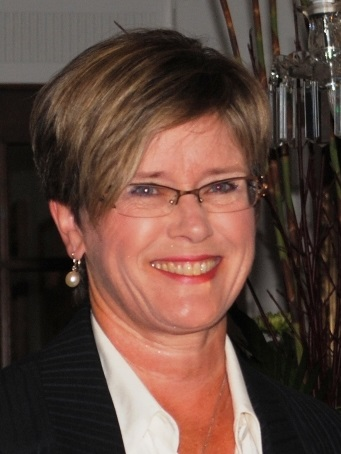
Kerry Prendergast

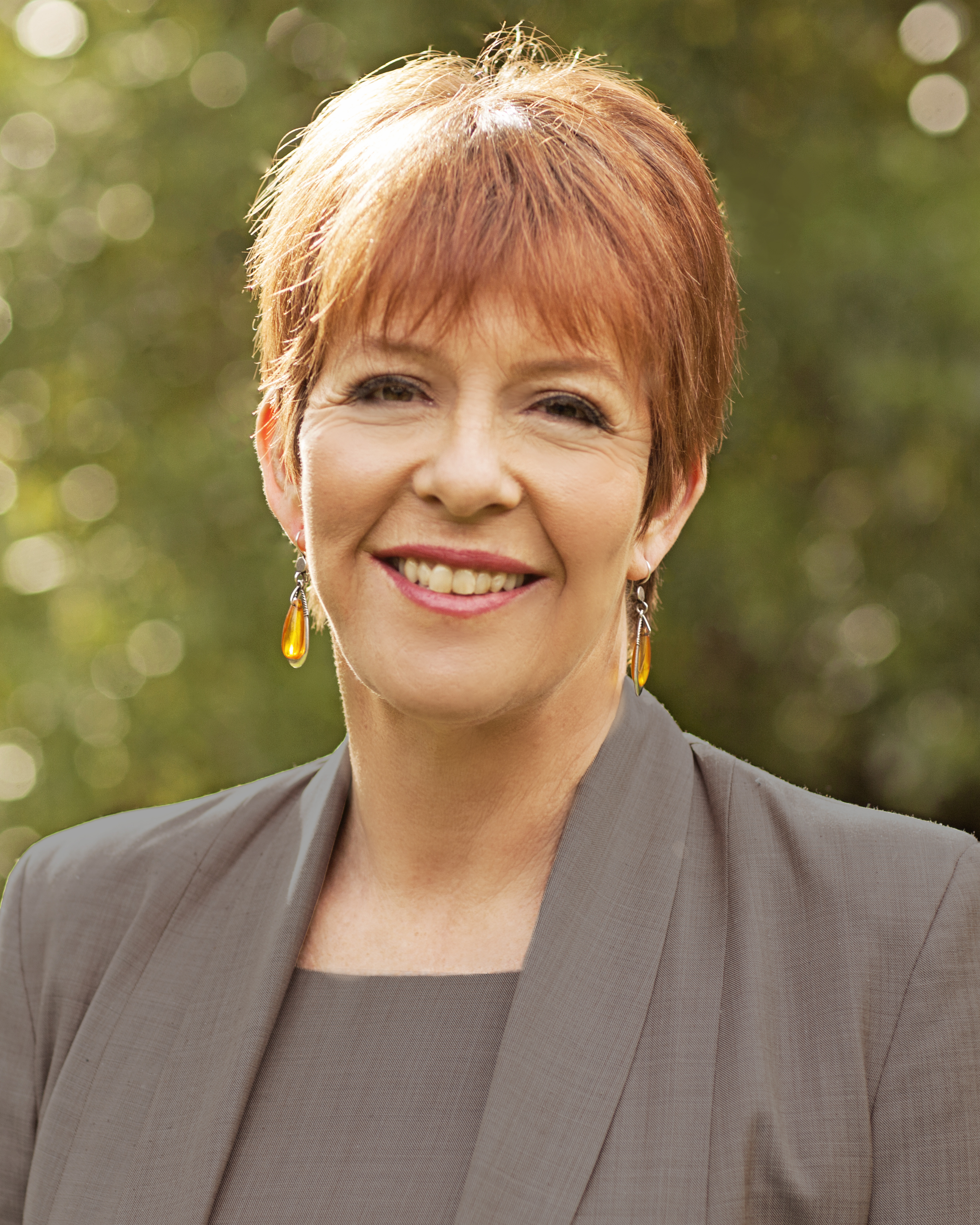
Celia Wade-Brown

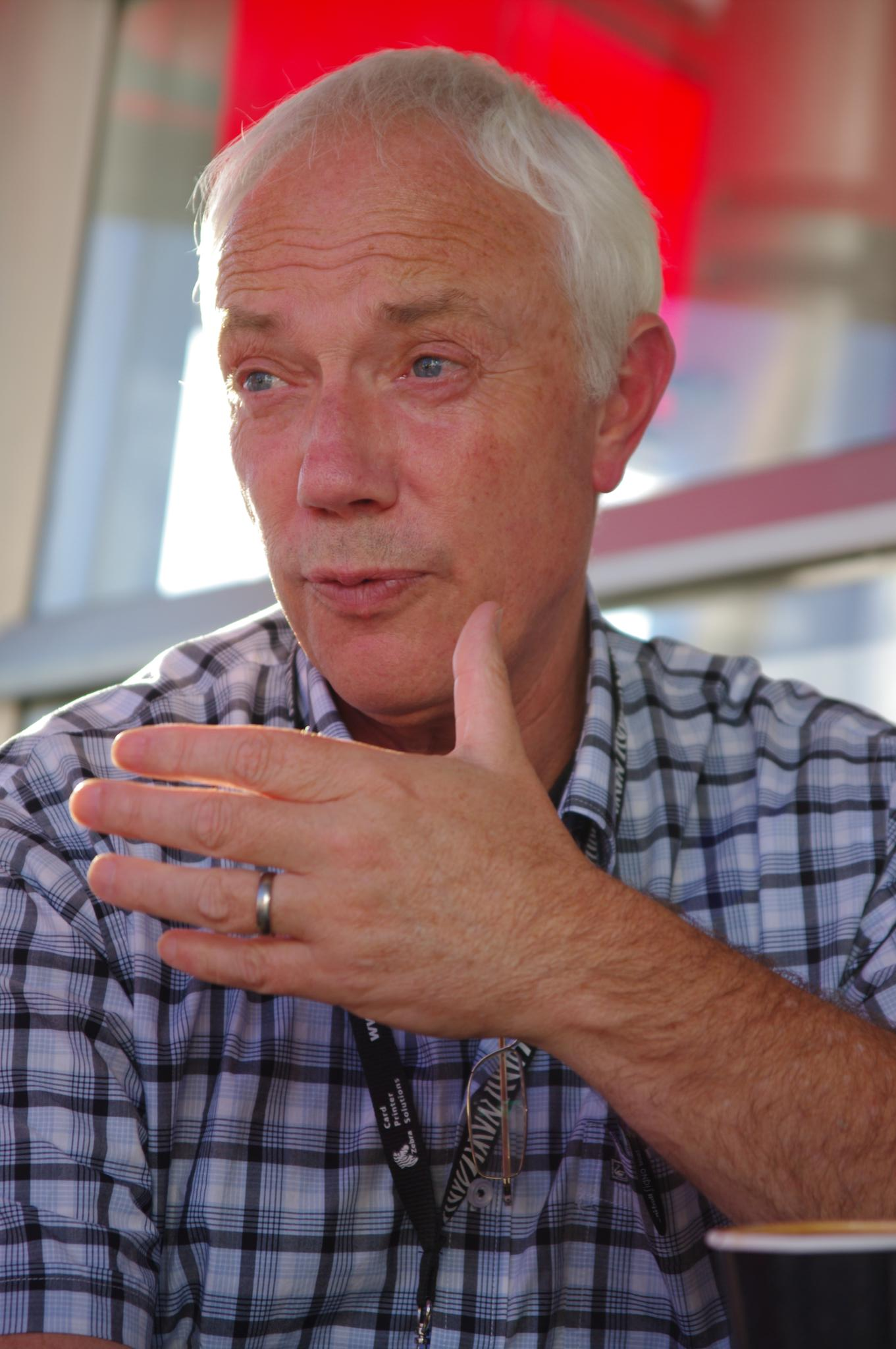
Bob Parker

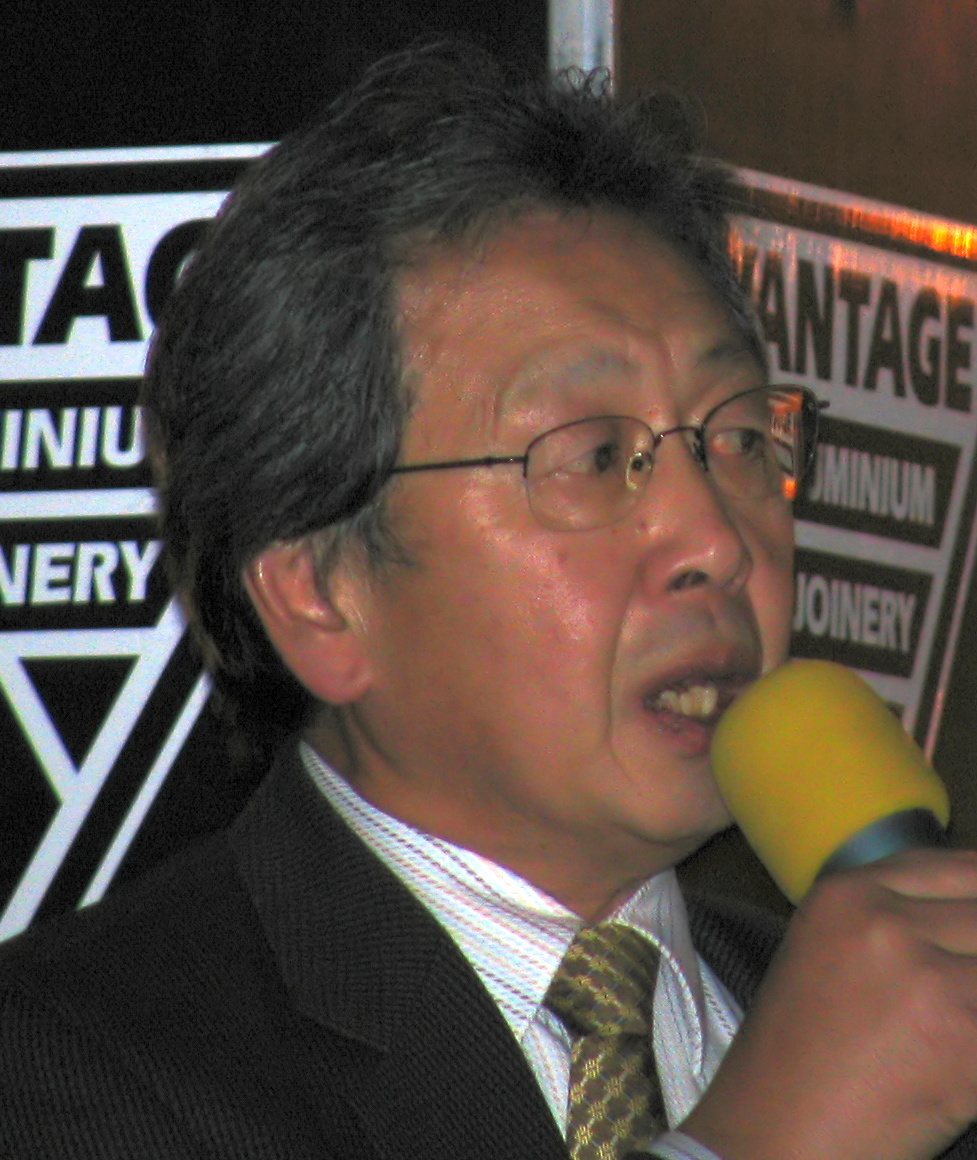
Peter Chin

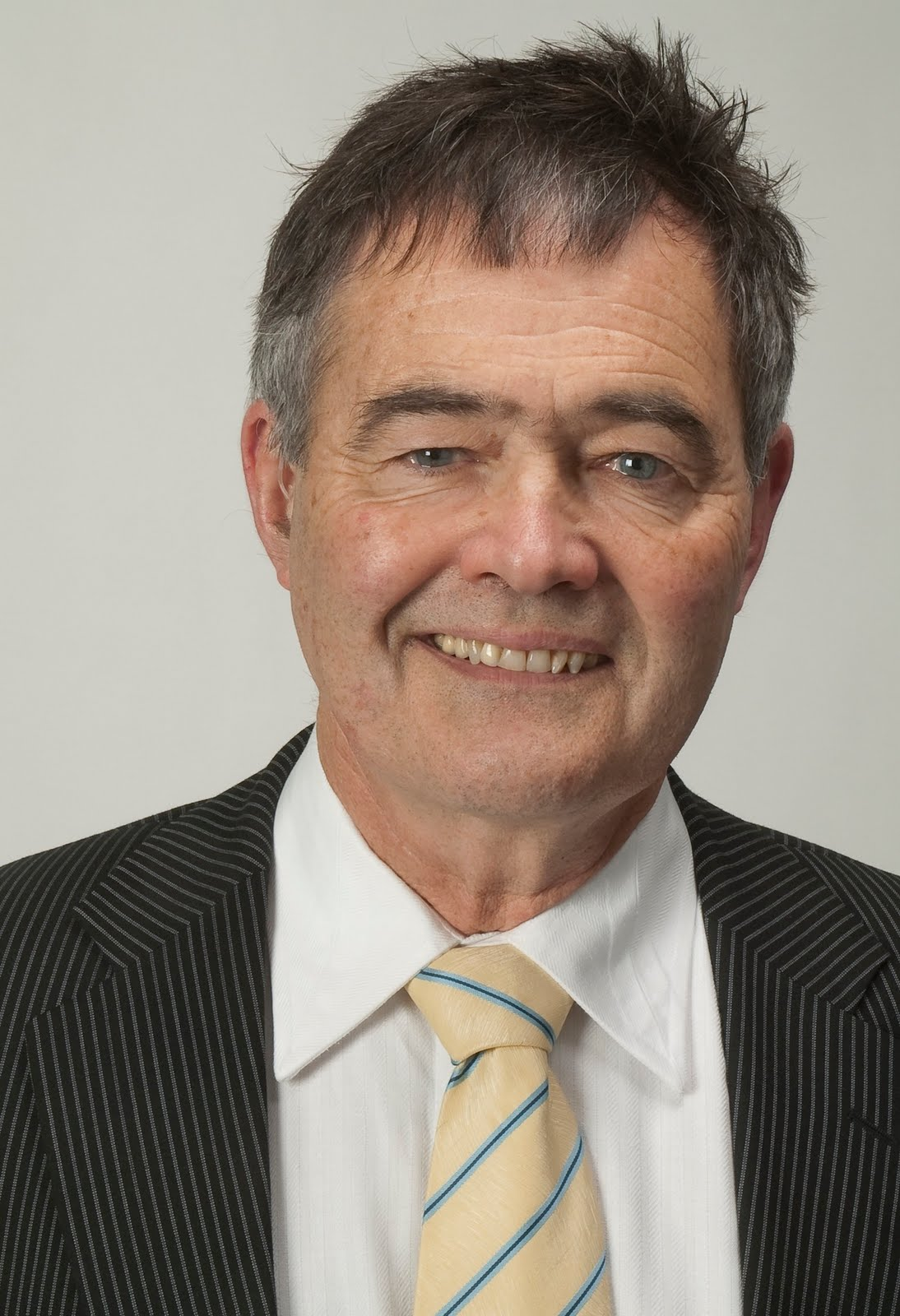
Dave Cull

== Events ==
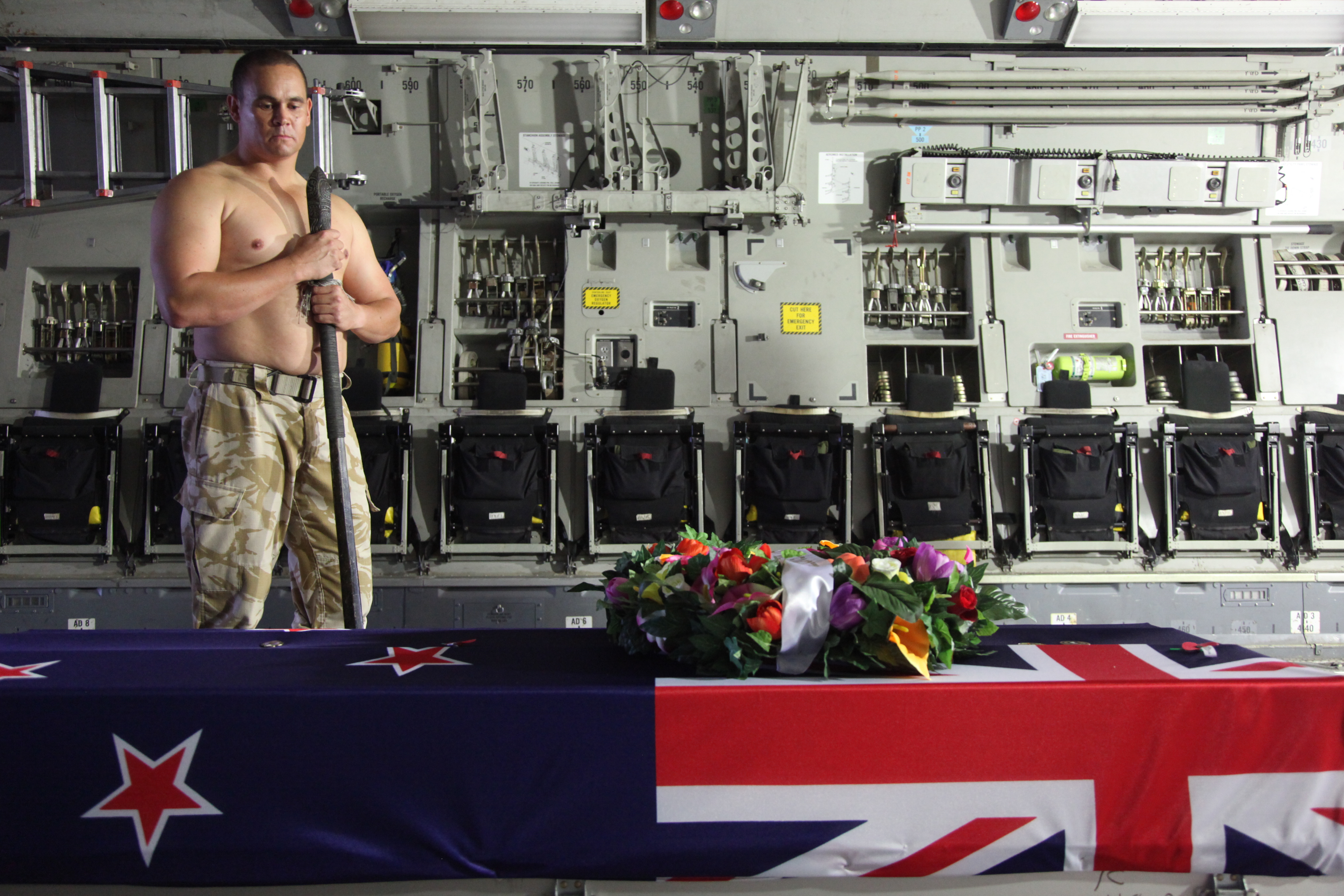
The transfer case of Timothy O'Donnell at Bagram Airfield

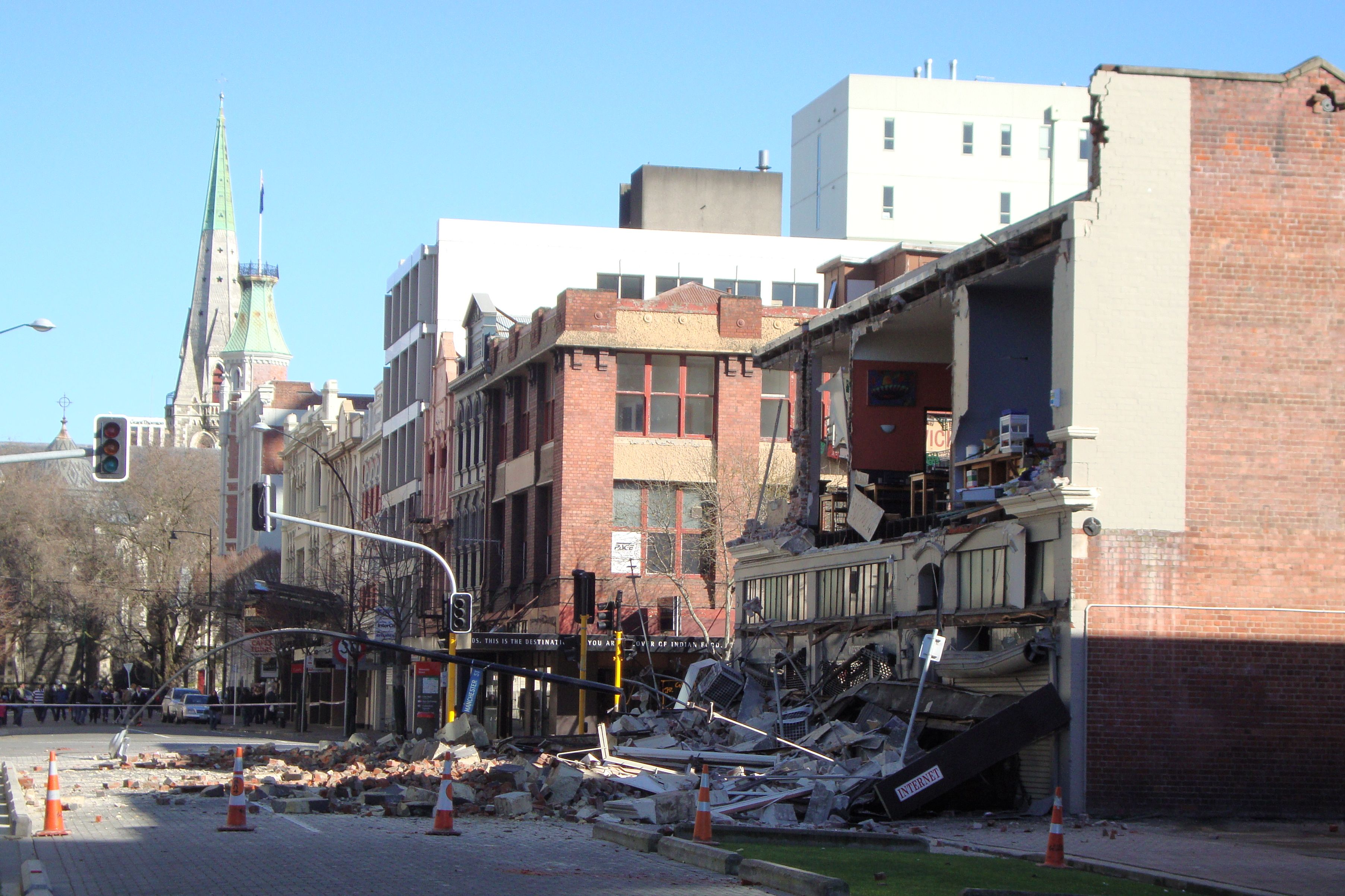
Earthquake damage at the corner of Worcester and Manchester Streets, Christchurch, on 4 September 2010

=== January ===
- 17–19 January: Prince William of Wales visits New Zealand, and represents The Queen officially for the first time by opening the new Supreme Court building in Wellington.

=== March ===
- Tasers are nationally rolled out for police.

=== April ===
- 25 April: Three members of the air force are killed when their Iroquois helicopter crashes on the way to Wellington for Anzac day commemorations.

=== July ===
- 13 July: Two police officers are injured and police dog Gage is killed after being confronted by an armed offender during a routine drugs search in Phillipstown, Christchurch. Gage would later be posthumously awarded the PDSA Gold Medal after taking a fatal gunshot wound protecting his injured handler.

=== August ===
- 4 August: Lieutenant Tim O'Donnell becomes the first New Zealand fatality of the War in Afghanistan after his convoy is attacked.

=== September ===
- 4 September
  - The 7.1 magnitude 2010 Canterbury earthquake causes widespread damage and several power outages, particularly in Christchurch.
  - All nine passengers on board are killed in a Fletcher FU24 crash, the worst aircraft crash in New Zealand in 17 years.
- 14 September: The Canterbury Earthquake Response and Recovery Act 2010 receives royal assent.
- 17 September: MP and Corrections Minister David Garrett resigns from the ACT party caucus after revelations that in 1984 he obtained a false passport using details of a deceased child.
- 17–22 September: A "storm the size of Australia" passes to the south of New Zealand bringing snow, rain, gales, tornadoes and causing widespread damage – 72,000 homes lose power, and the roof of a stadium collapses under a snow load in Invercargill and numerous roads are closed.

=== October ===
- 1 October: The largest reform in the tax system since the 1980s takes effect: GST is raised to 15%, company tax rates drop from 30% to 28%, and the top tax bracket falls from 38% to 33%.
- 5 October: Breakfast broadcaster Paul Henry is suspended by TVNZ after questioning if New Zealand's ethnic minority Governor-General Anand Satyanand, is a proper New Zealander. On 7 October Henry is embroiled in further controversy as his mockery of Delhi Chief Minister Sheila Dikshit is declared "racist" and "unacceptable" and New Zealand's ambassador to India is summoned for a dressing down. Henry resigns from TVNZ on 10 October.
- 9 October: Elections held for all of New Zealand's city, district and regional councils, and all District Health Boards.
- 27 October: After crisis talks with Warner Bros executives, Prime Minister John Key announces the $670 million project to film The Hobbit will go ahead in New Zealand. Acting unions had threatened to boycott the movies, leading Warner Bros and New Line to consider taking the production elsewhere.

=== November ===
- 19 November: A gas explosion in the Pike River coal mine traps 29 workers underground.
- 20 November: Labour candidate Kris Faafoi wins the 2010 Mana by-election

=== December ===
- 28 December: A storm moves up the country. Two bridges on the Aorere River are swept away, including the historic Salisbury Swing Bridge.

=== Holidays and observances ===
- 6 February – Waitangi Day
- 25 April – ANZAC Day
- 2 June – Queen's Birthday Monday
- 5 June – Matariki
- 27 October – Labour Day

== Awards ==
=== New Zealander of the year ===
The inaugural awards take place.

- New Zealander of the Year: Ray Avery
- Senior New Zealander of the Year: Sir Eion Edgar
- Young New Zealander of the Year: Divya Dhar
- Community of the Year: Victory Village
- Local Hero: Haami (Sam) Tutu Chapman

=== Performing arts ===
- Benny Award presented by the Variety Artists Club of New Zealand to Gary Daverne ONZM.

=== Film ===
- Boy
- Matariki
- Predicament
- Tracker
- Wound

== Sports ==
=== Commonwealth Games ===
Gold	Silver	Bronze	Total
6	22	8	36

=== Olympic Games ===
- New Zealand sends a team of 16 competitors in eight sports.

Gold	Silver	Bronze	Total
0	0	0	0

=== Paralympic Games ===
- New Zealand sends a team of two competitors in one sport.

Gold	Silver	Bronze	Total
1	0	0	1

=== Rowing ===
The 2010 World Rowing Championships were held at Lake Karapiro, near Hamilton, New Zealand, between 29 October – 7 November.

=== Rugby league ===
- New Zealand co-hosted the 2010 Four Nations and also won the tournament, defeating Australia in the final at Suncorp Stadium.
- The New Zealand Warriors finished fifth in the National Rugby League, before being eliminated in the first round of the play-offs. The Junior Warriors won the Toyota Cup.
- Auckland won the Albert Baskerville Trophy, defeating Counties Manukau in the final.

=== Shooting ===
- Ballinger Belt –
  - Jonathan Cload (United Kingdom)
  - Ross Geange (Otorohanga), second, top New Zealander

=== Soccer ===
At the 2010 FIFA World Cup finals in South Africa, New Zealand finish third in their pool after achieving three draws: 1–1 vs Slovakia, 1-1 vs Italy and 0-0 vs Paraguay.

== Births ==
- 21 August – Suavito, Thoroughbred racehorse
- 25 September – Puccini, Thoroughbred racehorse
- 23 October – Tiger Tara, Standardbred racehorse

== Deaths ==
=== January ===
- 7 January – Peggy Dunstan, poet, writer (born 1920)
- 12 January
  - Patricia Hook, religious sister, nurse and hospital administrator (born 1921)
  - Elizabeth Moody, actor (born 1939)
  - Juliet Peter, artist, potter, printmaker (born 1915)
- 23 January – Douglas J. Martin, religious leader (born 1927)
- 31 January – Pauly Fuemana, musician (born 1969)

=== February ===
- 7 February – Peter Lorimer, mathematician (born 1939)
- 8 February – Duncan McVey, association football player (born 1938)
- 23 February – Richard Giese, flautist (born 1924)

=== March ===
- 2 March – Mate Jakich, rugby union player (born 1940)
- 13 March
  - Sir Ian Axford, space scientist (born 1933)
  - Terry Heffernan, politician (born 1952)
- 17 March – Tim Chadwick, artist and author (born 1962)
- 21 March – Margaret Moth, photojournalist (born 1951)
- 25 March – Ben Gascoigne, astronomer (born 1915)
- 28 March – Sir Gaven Donne, jurist, former Chief Justice of various Pacific nations (born 1914)
- 30 March – Bruce Turner, field hockey player and cricketer (born 1930)

=== April ===
- 2 April – Malcolm Hahn, athlete (born 1931)
- 5 April – Jim Edwards, politician (born 1927)
- 6 April – Tony MacGibbon, cricketer (born 1924)
- 17 April – Mervyn Probine, physicist and public servant (born 1924)
- 28 April – Elma Maua, journalist (born 1948)

=== May ===
- 8 May – Deborah Pullen, association football player (born 1963)
- 12 May – John Warham, photographer and ornithologist (born 1919)
- 16 May – Jason Palmer, prison guard (born c.1977)
- 20 May – Hugh Morris, founder of McDonald's New Zealand (born 1929)
- 21 May – Trevor Meale, cricketer (born 1928)
- 22 May – Peter Hall, World War II flying ace (born 1922)
- 23 May
  - Beaver, singer (born 1950)
  - Paul Reynolds, internet commentator (born 1949)
- 30 May – Dame Pat Evison, actor (born 1924)
- 31 May – Merata Mita, filmmaker (born 1942)

=== June ===
- 2 June – Bernie Galvin, economist and public servant (born 1933)
- 3 June
  - Ross Beever, geneticist and mycologist (born 1946)
  - Bill Clark, rugby union player (born 1929)
- 5 June – Sir Neil Anderson, naval officer (born 1927)
- 6 June – Vincent Ingram, Cook Islands politician (born 1946)
- 10 June – Paul Dobbs, motorcycle road racer (born 1970)
- 27 June – Eric Godley, botanist and biographer (born 1919)

=== July ===
- 7 July – Moko, bottlenose dolphin (born 2006)
- 8 July – Scott Guy, farmer
- 10 July
  - Eric Batchelor, soldier (born 1920)
  - David Gay, soldier, cricketer and educator (born 1920)
- 20 July
  - Sir Randal Elliott, ophthalmologist (born 1922)
  - Gus Fisher, fashion industry leader and philanthropist (born 1920)
  - Sir Gordon Mason, local-body politician (born 1921)
  - Peta Rutter, actor (born 1959)
- 25 July – Barrie Devenport, Cook Strait swimmer (born 1935)
- 28 July – Bob Quickenden, association footballer (born 1923)
- 30 July – Esme Tombleson, politician (born 1917)

=== August ===
- 1 August – Eric Tindill, cricketer and rugby player (born 1910)
- 11 August – Sir Ron Trotter, businessman (born 1927)
- 14 August – O. E. Middleton, writer (born 1925)
- 17 August – Koro Dewes, Ngāti Porou kaumātua and Māori language advocate (born 1930)
- 24 August – Sir Graham Liggins, medical scientist (born 1926)
- 28 August – Sir Patrick O'Dea, public servant (born 1918)

=== September ===
- 21 September – Sir Archie Taiaroa, Māori leader (born 1937)
- 22 September – Graeme Hunt, journalist, author and historian (born 1952)
- 25 September
  - Allan Elsom, rugby union player (born 1925)
  - Morrie McHugh, rugby union player (born 1917)

=== October ===
- 7 October – Ian Morris, musician (born 1957)
- 10 October – Les Gibbard, cartoonist (born 1945)
- 27 October – Maurice Goodall, Anglican bishop (born 1928)
- 28 October – Keith Bracey, broadcaster (born 1916)
- 29 October – John Mudgeway, rugby player (born c.1961)
- 31 October – Alan Blake, rugby union player (born 1922)

=== November ===
- 7 November – Kurt Baier, philosophy academic (born 1917)
- 8 November – Tom Walker, soil science academic and television personality (born 1916)
- 9 November – John Cunneen, eighth Bishop of the Roman Catholic Diocese of Christchurch (born 1932)
- 14 November – Sir Gordon Bisson, naval officer and jurist (born 1918)
- 17 November – Johnny Simpson, rugby player (born 1922)
- 28 November – Te Aue Davis, Māori weaver (born 1925)

=== December ===
- 4 December – Adrienne Simpson, broadcaster, historian, musicologist and writer (born 1943)
- 14 December – Ruth Park, author (born 1917)
- 15 December
  - Tom Newnham, political activist and educationalist (born 1926)
  - Sir Ross Jansen, local-body politician (born 1932)
- 28 December – Denis Dutton, philosophy academic (born 1944)
- 30 December – Rex Hamilton, sport shooter (born 1928)
- 31 December – Syd Ward, cricketer (born 1907)

== See also ==
- List of years in New Zealand
- Timeline of New Zealand history
- History of New Zealand
- Military history of New Zealand
- Timeline of the New Zealand environment
- Timeline of New Zealand's links with Antarctica
