= Raybon Kan =

New Zealand comedian (born 1966)

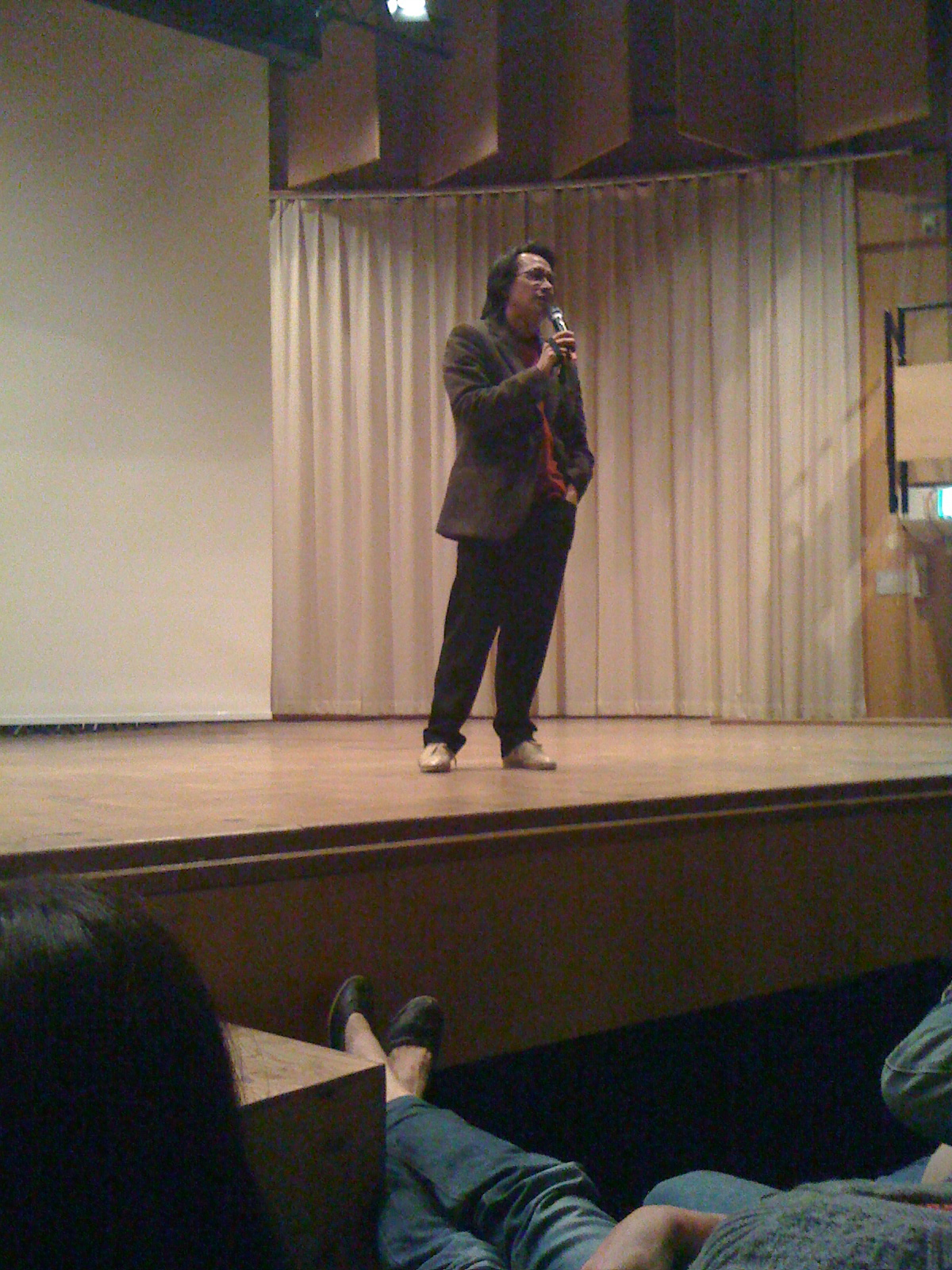
- Raybon Kan hosting a Q&A in Lund, Sweden at Fantastisk Film Festival, 2009
- Born: 1966 (age 59–60); Masterton, New Zealand

Comedy career
- Years active: 1996-present
- Medium: Stand-up, television

Raybon Kan (born 1966) is a New Zealand comedian and newspaper columnist.

== Early life and family ==
Kan's family moved to Wellington, New Zealand soon after his birth in Masterton. He began his education at St Mark's Church School. He showed an early flair for public performance which he continued at Wellington College and was School Council President and proxime accessit to dux. He attended Victoria University of Wellington's law school, and earned his LL B(Hons) and was admitted to the Bar. He was president of the Victoria University of Wellington Debating Society, and captained the team to second place in the World Universities Debating Championships, losing the final to the University of Oxford. While at Victoria University he won the Dominion Journalism Scholarship, and the Energy Law Research Scholarship. His article on energy law was published in the New Zealand Law Journal.

== Career ==
Kan first came to media prominence writing television reviews for The Dominion newspaper in Wellington and performed stand-up comedy on stage and on television. His television work included regular appearances on comedy sketch shows.

Kan was named Best Comedian by Metro and North and South magazines on repeated occasions in New Zealand. He has performed at the Melbourne Comedy Festival, (where The Age newspaper named him one of the festival's highlights,) the Montreal Comedy Festival (1998 and 2001) and the Edinburgh Fringe. He has also performed in Calgary, Toronto, Vancouver, Hong Kong, San Francisco, Los Angeles and Sydney. He was nominated for the inaugural Billy T Award in 1997.

His movie reviews featured in TV3's Nightline nightly news programme. His New Zealand TV appearances include "Pulp Comedy", "Laugh Festival Gala," "Before Stardom", "Look Who's Famous Now", Skitz, "Test the Nation" (which he won three times), "The Great New Zealand Spelling Bee", Inside New Zealand, a documentary in which he trained for two months to be a casino croupier; and a profile in TV's 60 Minutes. In Australia he performed on "Hey Hey It's Saturday" and was interviewed by Bert Newton.

Kan wrote Five Days in Las Vegas in the early 1990s about his travels to the United States where he appeared on Wheel of Fortune. Another travel-based book America on Five Bullets a Day was published in 1998 and featured his love of tennis. A collection of his short writings was published by Penguin in 2004 as An Asian at My Table. For many years he continued to write a column in The Sunday Star Times.

He has appeared in the films I'll Make You Happy (directed by Athina Tsoulis), Tongan Ninja (directed by Jason Stutter), and Spooked (directed by Geoff Murphy). In November 2004, he became the TV commercial spokesman for the Freedom Air airline in New Zealand.

For a time, Kan was based in the United Kingdom, and in 2009 he performed his stand-up show 'Spermbank Millionaire' at the Edinburgh Fringe. The film he starred in, and co-wrote with Jason Stutter, Diagnosis: Death, was also released in 2009.

Kan was interviewed in Funny As, the 2019 TVNZ One documentary series tracing the history of NZ comedy.

In 2021, Kan guested on TVNZ One's reboot of the charades game show Give Us a Clue. Kan had appeared many times in the original 1990s NZ series on TV3.

In 2025, Kan marked his 30th anniversary in stand-up comedy with his greatest hits show Raybonanza.

In August 2026, a joke of Kan's from 1996 went viral after an incident in NZ's Parliament in which NZ Foreign Affairs Minister Winston Peters told Lawrence Xu-Nan, a Chinese-NZ MP to "go back where you came from."

In the same week, Kan revealed in a newspaper op-ed that Winston Peters had said the same thing to him privately in the 1990s.

== Personal life ==
Kan continues to provide commentary on social issues in print media, and is a guest speaker for events. He is of Chinese heritage and has commented on how racist attitudes affect people of Asian appearance in New Zealand.

In 2008, Kan was awarded a Bravo award by the New Zealand Skeptics for his column "I see dud people," wherein he stated "I don’t want to get in the way of entertainers earning a crust, but it’s scummy to pretend to communicate with the dead to take advantage of grieving relatives."

As a poker player, Kan came 11th in the 2013 ANZPT Auckland Main Event, bubbling on the final table and came 6th in the 2014 ANZPT Melbourne No Limit Hold 'em Deepstack Tournament.

Takapuna Grammar School in Auckland awards an annual prize for Best Comic Performance, called the Raybon Kan Trophy.

== See also ==
- List of New Zealand television personalities
