= Peter Lorimer (disambiguation) =

Peter Lorimer (1946–2021) was a Scottish association footballer who played for Leeds United.

Peter Lorimer may also refer to:

- Peter Lorimer (moderator) (1812–1879), Scottish historian, religious author, and minister of the Church of Scotland
- Peter Lorimer (mathematician) (1939–2010), New Zealand mathematician
