= Jason Stutter =

New Zealand film director

Jason Stutter is a New Zealand-based motion picture, television and commercial director.

He has directed a number of short movies, including Blood Suckers and Careful With That Axe, the latter winning the Golden Spike Award for best short film at the film festival in Valladolid, Spain.

In 2009 he directed Diagnosis: Death, a feature film starring Jemaine Clement, Bret McKenzie and Rhys Darby (of Flight of the Conchords fame).

In 2010 he directed Predicament, starring Jemaine Clement, Heath Franklin, Hayden Frost and Tim Finn.

In 2015 he co-wrote, edited, and directed The Dead Room starring Jed Brophy, Jeffrey Thomas (actor), and Laura Petersen.

== Films ==
- Tongan Ninja (2002)
- Diagnosis: Death (2009)
- Predicament (2010)
- The Dead Room (2015)

== Television ==
- Warren's Vortex (2025)
