= Ronald Hugh Morrieson =

New Zealand author

Ronald Hugh Morrieson (29 January 1922 – 26 December 1972) was a novelist and short story writer in the New Zealand vernacular, who was little known in his home country until after his death. He earned his living as a musician and music teacher, and played in dance bands throughout south Taranaki. Morrieson lived in the Taranaki town of Hāwera all his life and this town appears (under other names) in his novels. He was a heavy drinker throughout his life and this contributed to his early death.

== Novels ==
Morrieson wrote four novels: coming of age tale The Scarecrow (1963), Came a Hot Friday (1964), Predicament (published in 1975) and his only contemporary novel Pallet on the Floor (1976), which may have been unfinished upon his death. All have been adapted for the cinema. Two short stories were published posthumously, in 1974; "Cross My Heart And Cut My Throat" and "The Chimney".

Morrieson's first two novels were published in Australia by Angus & Robertson and received good reviews there, but the company declined to publish his third novel, Predicament. Like his last novel, Pallet on the Floor, it was only published posthumously, by Dunmore Press in Palmerston North. They have all been republished by Penguin.

In early 1972 Morrieson lamented to novelist Maurice Shadbolt, "I hope I'm not another one of these poor buggers who get discovered when they're dead", only to die in obscurity in his small home town of Hāwera.

According to the book New Zealand Film 1912–1996, Morrison's novels contain his "trademark preoccupations ... of sex, death, mateship, voyeurism, violence, booze and mayhem in bleak small town New Zealand – along with his irreverent black humour".

Lawrence Jones said of Morrieson that it was "doubtful whether the anti-puritan underside of New Zealand small-town life ... has ever been so successfully caught". He classed Morrieson as one of the novelists of the "Provincial Period, 1935–1964", and one of the saddest, thanks to a lack of recognition during his life, despite support from authors Maurice Shadbolt and C. K. Stead.

== Screen adaptations ==
Excerpts from Morrieson's writings were dramatised for 1982 television production One of those Blighters.

The first feature film based on a Morrieson novel was The Scarecrow (1982), which was released in some territories as "Klynham Summer". Featuring American horror legend John Carradine as a mysterious stranger who arrives in 50s-era small town New Zealand, it was the first New Zealand film selected for the Director's Fortnight section of the Cannes Film Festival.

The most successful film based on Morrieson's work remains the ensemble comedy Came a Hot Friday (1984), which became one of the most successful local films released in New Zealand during the 1980s. The tale of two conmen stars Peter Bland, Phillip Gordon and a much praised supporting performance by Māori comedian Billy T James, as a man who thinks he is a Mexican bandito.

The abattoir tale Pallet on the Floor (1986) received limited release in New Zealand, three years after it was filmed.

Predicament (2010) was the last of Morrieson's novels to be adapted for cinema. Starring Hayden Frost, Jemaine Clement, and Australian comedian Heath Franklin, it won six technical awards at the 2011 Aotearoa Film and Television Awards. The movie was partly filmed in the Taranaki towns of Hāwera and Eltham.

== Post death ==
During the early 1990s, Morrieson's house on the corner of Regent Street and South Road, Hāwera was pulled down to make way for a Kentucky Fried Chicken outlet. A protest group from within Hāwera who called themselves The Scarecrow Committee, after Morrieson's novel, tried in vain to prevent the author's house being pulled down. However, there was little support from townsfolk, local identities or the town council to have Morrieson's historic house stand in the way of KFC.

Following the unsuccessful campaign to save Morrieson's house, one of the Scarecrow Committee's supporters, Mark Burt, created a café/bar in Hāwera in honour of Morrieson and named it 'Morriesons'. The instigator of the Scarecrow Committee, Hāwera artist and writer Tim Chadwick along with author and friend of Morrieson, Maurice Shadbolt officially cut the ribbon at the official opening of the bar on Victoria Street.

When the Morrieson homestead was knocked down about 20 years ago to make way for Hāwera's first fast-food restaurant - KFC - Hāwera resident Robert Surgenor negotiated a deal and rescued the house's attic. It sat on his farm, slowly rotting away behind a boxthorn hedge, while Mr Surgenor discussed with his friend, Tawhiti Museum owner Nigel Ogle, how best to use it. "Without him deciding to do that, this project would never have happened," Mr Ogle said. "You won't get any closer to Ron now." Mr Surgenor said he had several offers for the attic over the years but refused them all in favour of somewhere local. "Where it's gone is a good place for it." The Tawhiti display took 11 months of building and restoring at a cost of $60,000. Mr Ogle said the purpose-built facility is intended to help people get to know South Taranaki's quirkiest famous author.

The annual Ronald Hugh Morrieson Literary Awards take place during the third school term each year. It is in its 32nd year and is open to secondary school students whose parents are South Taranaki District Council residents or ratepayers. Since 2009, the short story competition has also included an open section for people over the age of 13 and who are residents or ratepayers in the wider Taranaki region.

A fictional meeting between Morrieson and poet James K. Baxter is detailed in Horseplay, a play by award-winning playwright Ken Duncum. The play was first staged at BATS Theatre, Wellington in November 1994 and later revived by Auckland Theatre Company in May 2010, as part of the Auckland Readers and Writers Festival. It featured John Leigh as Morrieson, and Tim Balme as Baxter.
