= The Dead Room =

- Directed by: Jason Stutter
- Written by: Kevin Stevens; Jason Stutter
- Produced by: Kevin Stevens
- Starring: Jed Brophy; Jeffrey Thomas; Laura Petersen
- Cinematography: Grant Atkinson
- Edited by: Jason Stutter
- Music by: David Donaldson; Steve Roche; Janet Roddick
- Production company: Centron Pictures
- Distributed by: Falcon Films; Scream Factory; IFC Midnight
- Release date: 31 October 2015
- Running time: 80 minutes
- Country: New Zealand
- Language: English

The Dead Room is a 2015 New Zealand horror film directed by Jason Stutter, who co-wrote it with Kevin Stevens. The Dead Room was inspired by the 1970s urban legend of a haunted farmhouse in Central Otago, New Zealand. It stars Jed Brophy, Jeffrey Thomas, and Laura Petersen as ghost hunters who are hired to determine if a house is haunted. It premiered at Sitges Film Festival in October 2015 and was released later that month in New Zealand.

== Plot ==
An insurance company hires three ghost hunters to investigate the haunting after a ghost scares a family out of their home. They include Liam, who handles their technological tools; skeptic Scott; and psychic Holly. At first, Holly senses nothing in the house, and Scott's tools measure no electromagnetic disturbances. After Liam sets up several cameras with sensors, they go to sleep. At 3 am, the cameras pick up movement, which Scott later dismisses as a draft. As Liam and Scott discuss their previous cases, Scott describes his theory that low-frequency sound can disperse a ghost, and Liam shows Holly footage of a chair rocking by itself. Scott admits that he cannot explain the footage, and he says he wants to find a scientific explanation for the paranormal.

A loud noise wakes the ghost hunters at 3 am the next night, and Holly says she sees a ghostly figure, which neither of the men can see. In the morning, Scott tells them nobody will accept their evidence, as it is too subjective. Despite their frustration, Liam and Holly eventually agree, and the three proceed through each room, attempting to establish contact. Before going to sleep, they set alarms to wake just before 3 am. That night, Holly sees the ghostly figure again, and it reacts aggressively, threatening her. Scott calms the others by telling them that there is no evidence a ghost has ever harmed a living person; all it can do is scare them. Holly, more shaken than the others, reveals she took the job to conquer her fear of ghosts.

During the day, Holly senses a presence and strong temperature change, which the others do not feel. Scott's EMF meter reads nothing, but he soon realizes he forgot to insert a battery. Once he inserts the battery, it immediately starts to register a significant disturbance. The reading abruptly stops at the end of the main hallway, and Holly confirms that there is no presence in the kitchen. The ghost later pursues them, reinforcing their decision to seek refuge in the kitchen. Worried that the attacks could turn dangerous, Liam and Holly argue they should leave the house. Scott, however, insists they stay to capture evidence of the paranormal. When they subsequently film a telekinetic attack by flying furniture, Scott again insists they stay, this time to test his theory. Liam, who owns their transportation, reluctantly agrees, overriding Holly's objections.

During the ghost's next appearance, Liam restarts the house's generator while Scott sets up his equipment. Holly confirms that the ghost has vanished when the machine reaches its lowest frequency. As the relieved ghost hunters pack up their equipment, Liam notices a strangely cold corner in the kitchen. Upon further investigation, a hidden passage leads to another room. There, they discover the mummified remains of a woman. Overwhelmed by a paranormal presence, Holly is forced to leave the room, and the others call the police, who, after looking, say there is no body in the room. As the ghost hunters attempt to convince the police officers of their story, Holly is suddenly possessed and reveals that the first ghost was trying to frighten them off and protect them from the second, the woman. The second ghost quickly kills the police officers, then Scott. Liam sacrifices himself to save Holly. As Holly flees the house, the ghost kills her. In the final scene, the killer ghost finally shows itself, and the credits roll.

== Cast ==
- Jed Brophy as Liam Andrews
- Jeffrey Thomas as Scott Cameron
- Laura Petersen as Holly Mathews

== Release ==
The Dead Room premiered at the Sitges Film Festival on 14 October 2015. It was released in New Zealand on 29 October 2015. IFC Midnight released it in the US in April 2016, and Scream Factory is releasing the film on Blu-ray and DVD 6 September 2016.

== Reception ==
Matt Donato of We Got This Covered wrote, "You've visited haunted houses that are more hair-raising than The Dead Room." Noel Murray at the Los Angeles Times described the lack of excitement or scary scenes and with the exception of the last 10 minutes, when "Stutter builds to a genuinely impressive sequence of spooky special effects and mayhem." Ben Spurling of Movies & Mania praised the effort put into the film, but found the result underwhelming. "It won’t necessarily be what puts you to sleep, though it doesn’t go out of its way to jolt you from dozing if that’s where you’re already headed."
