= Jed Brophy =

New Zealand actor (born 1963)

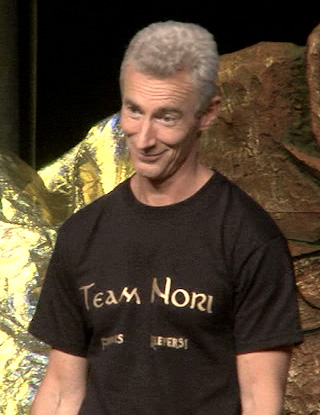
- Brophy in April 2015
- Born: 29 October 1963 (age 62); Taihape, New Zealand
- Occupation: Actor
- Years active: 1988–present

Jed Brophy (born 29 October 1963) is a New Zealand actor. He has appeared in several of Peter Jackson's films, including Braindead, Heavenly Creatures, The Lord of the Rings film trilogy, and King Kong. Brophy also appears as the dwarf Nori in The Hobbit films.

== Biography ==
Brophy was born in Taihape in 1963. He grew up in Mataroa and went to school at Mataroa Primary School and Palmerston North Boys' High School.

He was educated at Toi Whakaari: New Zealand Drama School, graduating in 1987 with a Diploma in Acting. He started acting in stage productions in Wellington in the 1980s. He became well known for his role in Gary Henderson's play Skin Tight, which he performed hundreds of times over numerous tours. When it was performed at the Edinburgh Fringe Festival in 1998 it won the Scotsman Fringe First Award.

The first screen role Brophy played was in 1988 in Small War on the Edge of Town produced by the National Film Unit. He has been part of many screen and film projects with director Peter Jackson and associated digital company Weta.

== Awards ==
Nokia New Zealand Film Awards (2001) - Nominated for Best Performance in a Short Film: for Room Tone

Drifting Clouds Short Film Festival New Zealand (2000) - Best Actor: for Group Therapy

Chapman Tripp Theatre Awards (2009) - Best Actor for The Blackening by Paul Rothwell

== Filmography ==
Year	Title	Role	Notes
1991	Shark in the Park	Vci Molloy	TV series. Episode: "You've Gotta Have Mates"
1992	Chunuk Bair	Private Fred South	
1992	Absent Without Leave	Joe	
1992	Braindead	Void	First collaboration with Peter Jackson. Also known as Dead Alive in North America.
1994	A Little Death		Short film
1994	Lemming Aid		Short film
1994	The Last Tattoo	Furlough Guard	
1994	Heavenly Creatures	John/Nicholas	Directed by Peter Jackson
1996	Chicken	Will Tilfer	
1996	Hercules: The Legendary Journeys	Gnatius	TV series. Episode: "The Enforcer"
1996	Return to Treasure Island	Joseph Savage	TV movie
1997	Enid Blyton Secret Series	PC Cooper	TV series. Episode: "The Secret Island"
1998	Shortland Street	Dr. Jack Galloway	
1998	The Adventures of Swiss Family Robinson	Seth Parsons	TV series. Episode: "Survival: Part 1"
1998	Group Therapy	Ewen	Short film
2000	Xena: Warrior Princess	Ramius	TV series. Episode: "Looking Death in the Eye"
2001	The Lord of the Rings: The Fellowship of the Ring	Nazgûl	Directed by Peter Jackson
2002	The Lord of the Rings: The Two Towers	Sharku/Snaga, Orc Warg Rider, and the Rohan Rider in the Extended Cut.	Directed by Peter Jackson. (He was also a riding double)
2002	Tongan Ninja	Bank Manager	
2002	Revelations	Pieter	TV series. Episode: "Incident at Whitewater"
2003	Perfect Strangers	Pete	
2003	The Lord of the Rings: The Return of the King	Orc	Directed by Peter Jackson
2004	Fracture	Tony Dorio	Film
2005	King Kong	Venture Crew #1	Directed by Peter Jackson
2006	The Killian Curse	Mr. Shepard	TV series. Episode: "Water"
2007	Heavenly Sword	Commander/Clansmen	Video Game (Voice)
2008	Second Hand Wedding	Waz	
2009	District 9	Police Officer James Hope	
2009	Dreamer	Tamir's Father	Short
2009	Lovely Bones	Stunt Performer (New Zealand)	
2010	Home by Christmas	Mart Preston	
2010	The Warrior's Way	Jacques	
2010	Tracker	Posse Soldier Barker	
2010	Dangerous Road	Martin	Short
2010	Darryn Exists	Freckles	Short
2010	Legend of the Seeker	Shadrin	TV series. Episode: "Princess"
2010	RingCon 2010	Himself	Documentary
2011	Tangiwai	Dick Brittenden	TV movie
2012	The Hobbit: An Unexpected Journey	Nori	Directed by Peter Jackson.
2012	Lego the Lord of the Rings: The Video Game	Sharku	Video Game (Archive Footage)
2012	Big Morning Buzz Live with Carrie Keagan	Himself	TV series. Episode: "Cast of 'The Hobbit: An Unexpected Journey'/Jesse Tyler Ferguson/Carmen Electra"
2013	The Hobbit: The Desolation of Smaug	Nori	Directed by Peter Jackson.
2013	The Offering	Lord	Short
2013	Beep Beep and the Island of Terror	Lance Borman	Short
2014	The Hobbit: The Battle of the Five Armies	Nori	Directed by Peter Jackson.
2014	Lego The Hobbit	Nori	Video Game (Archive Footage)
2014	Calgary Expo 2014	Himself	Short
2015	The Shannara Chronicles	The Dagda Mor	TV series (adapted from the books)
2015	The Dead Room	Liam Andrews	
2019	Killer Sofa	Bob Gravy	
2022	The Lord of the Rings: The Rings of Power	Tavern Orc / Hunter Orc / Orc / Vrath	TV series
