= Geometry of Complex Numbers =

Maths textbook

- 1979 edition
- Author: Hans Schwerdtfeger
- Language: English
- Subject: Geometry
- Genre: Mathematics
- Publisher: University of Toronto Press
- Publication date: 1962
- Publication place: Canada

Geometry of Complex Numbers is an undergraduate textbook on geometry, whose topics include circles, the complex plane, inversive geometry, and non-Euclidean geometry. It was written by Hans Schwerdtfeger, and originally published in 1962 as Volume 13 of the Mathematical Expositions series of the University of Toronto Press. A corrected edition was published in 1979 in the Dover Books on Advanced Mathematics series of Dover Publications (ISBN 0-486-63830-8), including the subtitle Circle Geometry, Moebius Transformation, Non-Euclidean Geometry. The Basic Library List Committee of the Mathematical Association of America has suggested its inclusion in undergraduate mathematics libraries.

== Topics ==
The book is divided into three chapters, corresponding to the three parts of its subtitle: circle geometry, Möbius transformations, and non-Euclidean geometry. Each of these is further divided into sections (which in other books would be called chapters) and sub-sections. An underlying theme of the book is the representation of the Euclidean plane as the plane of complex numbers, and the use of complex numbers as coordinates to describe geometric objects and their transformations.

The chapter on circles covers the analytic geometry of circles in the complex plane. It describes the representation of circles by $2\times 2$ Hermitian matrices, the inversion of circles, stereographic projection, pencils of circles (certain one-parameter families of circles) and their two-parameter analogue, bundles of circles, and the cross-ratio of four complex numbers.

The chapter on Möbius transformations is the central part of the book, and defines these transformations as the fractional linear transformations of the complex plane (one of several standard ways of defining them). It includes material on the classification of these transformations, on the characteristic parallelograms of these transformations, on the subgroups of the group of transformations, on iterated transformations that either return to the identity (forming a periodic sequence) or produce an infinite sequence of transformations, and a geometric characterization of these transformations as the circle-preserving transformations of the complex plane. This chapter also briefly discusses applications of Möbius transformations in understanding the projectivities and perspectivities of projective geometry.

In the chapter on non-Euclidean geometry, the topics include the Poincaré disk model of the hyperbolic plane, elliptic geometry, spherical geometry, and (in line with Felix Klein's Erlangen program) the transformation groups of these geometries as subgroups of Möbious transformations.

This work brings together multiple areas of mathematics, with the intent of broadening the connections between abstract algebra, the theory of complex numbers, the theory of matrices, and geometry. Reviewer Howard Eves writes that, in its selection of material and its formulation of geometry, the book "largely reflects work of C. Caratheodory and E. Cartan".

== Audience and reception ==
Geometry of Complex Numbers is written for advanced undergraduates and its many exercises (called "examples") extend the material in its sections rather than merely checking what the reader has learned. Reviewing the original publication, A. W. Goodman and Howard Eves recommended its use as secondary reading for classes in complex analysis, and Goodman adds that "every expert in classical function theory should be familiar with this material". However, reviewer Donald Monk wonders whether the material of the book is too specialized to fit into any class, and has some minor complaints about details that could have been covered more elegantly.

By the time of his 2015 review, Mark Hunacek wrote that "the book has a decidedly old-fashioned vibe" making it more difficult to read, and that the dated selection of topics made it unlikely to be usable as the main text for a course. Reviewer R. P. Burn shares Hunacek's concerns about readability, and also complains that Schwerdtfeger "consistently lets geometrical interpretation follow algebraic proof, rather than allowing geometry to play a motivating role". Nevertheless Hunacek repeats Goodman's and Eves's recommendation for its use "as supplemental reading in a course on complex analysis", and Burn concludes that "the republication is welcome".

== Related reading ==
As background on the geometry covered in this book, reviewer R. P. Burn suggests two other books, Modern Geometry: The Straight Line and Circle by C. V. Durell, and Geometry: A Comprehensive Course by Daniel Pedoe.

Other books using complex numbers for analytic geometry include Complex Numbers and Geometry by Liang-shin Hahn, or Complex Numbers from A to...Z by Titu Andreescu and Dorin Andrica. However, Geometry of Complex Numbers differs from these books in avoiding elementary constructions in Euclidean geometry and instead applying this approach to higher-level concepts such as circle inversion and non-Euclidean geometry. Another related book, one of a small number that treat the Möbius transformations in as much detail as Geometry of Complex Numbers does, is Visual Complex Analysis by Tristan Needham.
