= The Spearman Experiment =

- Genre: Nostalgia
- Presented by: Magda Szubanski
- Country of origin: Australia
- Original language: English
- No. of seasons: 1
- No. of episodes: 8

Production
- Running time: 60 minutes

Original release
- Network: Network Ten
- Release: 8 September – 30 October 2009

The Spearman Experiment is an Australian television series, hosted by Magda Szubanski, that counts down Australian pop culture's most defining people and topics based on a public poll commented on by various Australian celebrities. The show is named for Charles Spearman, who developed Spearman's rank correlation coefficient, the statistical technique used to survey the public to produce the show's rankings. It premiered on 8 September 2009.

The series began development in May 2009, and was officially announced in early August 2009. The show was ultimately cancelled due to low ratings.

== Format ==
The host and guest celebrities analyse, critique and celebrate Australia's most popular topics interspersed with film clips. The show has been compared to clip show 20 to One, which aired on Channel 9. However, The Spearman Experiment only counts down the top 15, rather than the top 20. Channel Ten also advertises the fact that The Spearman Experiment's results are chosen by the public rather than television executives, as is the case with 20 to One.

== Episodes ==
- Episode 1: Aussie Comedy Characters – 8 September 2009
- Episode 2: Awesome Underdogs – 15 September 2009
- Episode 3: Cashed-up Bogans – 22 September 2009
- Episode 4: Songs You Should Never Have on Your iPod – 29 September 2009
- Episode 5: Catchphrases – 6 October 2009
- Episode 6: Weird True Freaky – 16 October 2009
- Episode 7: Animated Characters – 23 October 2009
- Episode 8: Shocking Reality TV Moments – 30 October 2009

== Contributors ==
- Angela Bishop
- Anh Do
- Anthony Maroon
- Bill Woods
- Brad McEwan
- Carson Kressley
- Charli Robinson
- Ciel Stowe
- Claire Hooper
- Colin Lane
- Chris Brown
- Chrissie Swan
- Dave Hughes
- Dave O'Neil
- Erin McNaught
- Fuzzy Agolley
- Heath Franklin as "Chopper"
- Holly Brisley
- Ian 'Dicko' Dickson
- James Kerley
- Jason Coleman
- Jonathan Pease
- Charlotte Dawson

- Kim Watkins
- Marcia Hines
- Matt Lee
- Maz Compton
- Merrick Watts
- Michelle Bridges
- Mike Goldman
- Mikey Robins
- Natalie Bassingthwaighte
- Natalie Hunter
- Natarsha Belling
- Nikki Osborne
- Paul Mercurio
- Peter Helliar
- Samuel Johnson
- Sandra Sully
- Sara-Marie
- Sarah Wilson
- Shannan Ponton
- Tim Ross
- Tom Gleeson
- Zoe Naylor

== Ratings ==
The Spearman Experiment drew 1.039 million viewers nationally for its premiere episode making it the 11th most viewed program of the day. The show's second week showed a massive decline in audience, with national ratings dropping to 699,000 viewers, coming fourth in its timeslot. In its third week, ratings grew to 808,000, coming third in its timeslot. The fourth week, it dropped to 668,000 which made it the 17th most watched program that evening. On 16 October 2009, the show was moved to a Friday night timeslot of 7:30 pm, to make way for new episodes of The Simpsons on Tuesday night.

== See also ==
- 20 to One
- List of Australian television series
