= Diagnosis: Death =

- Directed by: Jason Stutter
- Written by: Raybon Kan; Jason Stutter
- Starring: Raybon Kan; Bret McKenzie; Jemaine Clement; Rhys Darby; Jessica Grace Smith
- Production company: Affordable Films
- Distributed by: Odins Eye Entertainment
- Release date: 15 October 2009
- Country: New Zealand
- Language: English

Diagnosis: Death is a 2009 horror comedy film made in New Zealand, directed by Jason Stutter, co-written by Stutter and Raybon Kan, and features three members of the TV-series Flight of the Conchords, Bret McKenzie in a substantial role and cameos by Jemaine Clement and Rhys Darby.

== Plot ==
The plot is set around a facility where new medications are tested on willing volunteers. While at an experimental drug weekend trial, Andre Chang and Juliet Reid meet and soon discover that their lives are in danger. The building is locked down for the testing period and it is found that the drug on trial causes extremely disturbing hallucinations that point towards a horrific double murder that took place at the facility. It is soon realised that the only way for them to escape is to solve the mystery behind this horrific secret. Eventually, they find out that the nurse in charge of the facility, Nurse Bates, murdered her sister and nephew in the facility and covered it up as a murder/suicide. In an attempt to keep them quiet, Nurse Bates tries to kill Andre and Juliet, but ghosts of her victims return and take vengeance, killing Bates by impaling her with a stool. Andre and Juliet are later cured of their ailments, despite the fact that they were given placebos in the trial. They then go off to take advantage of the second chance they have been given in life.

== Cast ==
- Raybon Kan as Andre Chang
- Jessica Grace Smith as Juliet Reid
- Suze Tye as Nurse Magaret Bates
- Bret McKenzie as Dr. Cruise
- Rhys Darby as Specialist
- Jemaine Clement as Garfield Olyphant
- Laura Surrich as Tawny
- Cameron Stevens as Henry Mansfield

== Release ==
Lightning Entertainment released the film on 3 August in the United States. The DVD was released on 29 December 2009.
