= Predicament (2010 film) =

- Theatrical release poster
- Directed by: Jason Stutter
- Written by: Jason Stutter
- Based on: Predicament by Ronald Hugh Morrieson
- Produced by: Sue Rogers
- Starring: Jemaine Clement; Hayden Frost; Heath Franklin; Tim Finn
- Cinematography: Simon Raby
- Production company: Midnight Film Productions Limited
- Distributed by: Rialto Distribution
- Release date: 26 August 2010
- Country: New Zealand
- Language: English

Predicament is a 2010 comedy horror film based on the 1975 novel by Ronald Hugh Morrieson and starring Jemaine Clement of the musical comedy duo Flight of the Conchords plus Tim Finn of the Finn Brothers. Filmed in Hāwera and Eltham in Taranaki, it was the last Morrieson novel to be adapted for cinema; his other three novels were filmed in the 1980s.

== Plot ==
Based on the novel of the same name, Predicament is a coming-of-age story and a crime comedy. It's an account of the powerful and disturbing psychological fantasy world of adolescence within the familiar small-town setting of novelist Morrieson's writing.

Naïve teenager Cedric Williamson is involved with two older criminally inclined misfits in photographing and blackmailing amorous couples, and ends up an accomplice to murder. It is set in a 1930s Taranaki town similar to Morrieson's Hāwera.

But while Morrieson's first two novels were published in Australia, Predicament was rejected by Angus & Robertson. It went through numerous drafts, many abandoned, before (like Pallet on the Floor) being published posthumously by Dunmore Press of Palmerston North in 1975.

== Cast ==
- Jemaine Clement as Spook, misfit
- Hayden Frost as Cedric Williamson, teenager
- Tim Finn as his father, Martin Williamson
- Heath Franklin as Mervyn Toebeck, misfit
- Rose McIver as Maybelle
- Edward Newborn as Detective Huggins
- David Van Horn as Officer Dawson
- Chad Mills as Blair Bramwell
- Brooke Williams as Margot Bramwell
- Peter Mochrie as Vernon Bramwell
- Carmel McGlone as Rita Zombrini
- Hadleigh Walker as Ernie Fox

== Film ==
The opening scene is of a hunched figure digging in the darkness, and demonstrates Simon Raby's superb cinematography; as does the next (daytime) shot of a high rickety wooden tower built by Cedric's mentally unbalanced father Martin. But when the characters start talking, what ought to be a darkly hilarious crime comedy dissolves into mush, according to reviewer David Larsen. The screenplay was written by the director Jason Stutter, who "chopped up and rearranged" Morrieson's dialogue.
