= Hans Schwerdtfeger =

German-Canadian-Australian mathematician

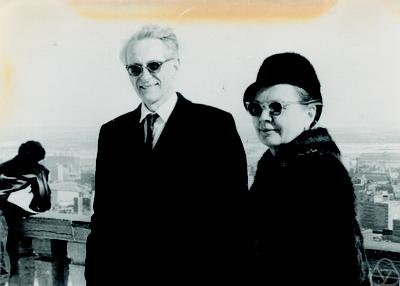
- Hans Schwerdtfeger (left)
- Born: 9 December 1902; Göttingen, German Empire
- Died: 26 June 1990 (aged 87); Adelaide, Australia
- Education: Bonn University
- Scientific career
- Fields: Mathematics
- Workplaces: University of Melbourne; McGill University; University of Adelaide
- Doctoral advisor: Otto Toeplitz
- Doctoral students: Peter James Lorimer

Hans Wilhelm Eduard Schwerdtfeger FRSC (9 December 1902 – 26 June 1990) was a German-Canadian-Australian mathematician who worked in Galois theory, matrix theory, theory of groups and their geometries, and complex analysis.

"In 1962 he published Geometry of Complex Numbers: Circle Geometry, Möbius Transformations, Non-Euclidean Geometry which: ... should be in every library, and every expert in classical function theory should be familiar with this material. The author has performed a distinct service by making this material so conveniently accessible in a single book. " - O'Connor, John J.; Robertson, Edmund F., "Hans Schwerdtfeger", MacTutor History of Mathematics Archive, University of St Andrews

== See also ==
- EP matrix
