= EP matrix =

In mathematics, an EP matrix (or range-Hermitian matrix or RPN matrix) is a square matrix A whose range is equal to the range of its conjugate transpose A*. Another equivalent characterization of EP matrices is that the range of A is orthogonal to the nullspace of A. Thus, EP matrices are also known as RPN (Range Perpendicular to Nullspace) matrices.

EP matrices were introduced in 1950 by Hans Schwerdtfeger, and since then, many equivalent characterizations of EP matrices have been investigated through the literature. The meaning of the EP abbreviation stands originally for Equal Principal, but it is widely believed that it stands for Equal Projectors instead, since an equivalent characterization of EP matrices is based in terms of equality of the projectors AA^{+} and A^{+}A.

The range of any matrix A is perpendicular to the null-space of A*, but is not necessarily perpendicular to the null-space of A. When A is an EP matrix, the range of A is precisely perpendicular to the null-space of A.

== Properties ==
- An equivalent characterization of an EP matrix A is that A commutes with its Moore-Penrose inverse, that is, the projectors AA^{+} and A^{+}A are equal. This is similar to the characterization of normal matrices where A commutes with its conjugate transpose. As a corollary, nonsingular matrices are always EP matrices.
- The sum of EP matrices A_{i} is an EP matrix if the null-space of the sum is contained in the null-space of each matrix A_{i}.
- To be an EP matrix is a necessary condition for normality: A is normal if and only if A is EP matrix and AA*A^{2} = A^{2}A*A.
- When A is an EP matrix, the Moore-Penrose inverse of A is equal to the group inverse of A.
- A is an EP matrix if and only if the Moore-Penrose inverse of A is an EP matrix.

== Decomposition ==
The spectral theorem states that a matrix is normal if and only if it is unitarily similar to a diagonal matrix.

Weakening the normality condition to EPness, a similar statement is still valid. Precisely, a matrix A of rank r is an EP matrix if and only if it is unitarily similar to a core-nilpotent matrix, that is,

$$A = U \begin{pmatrix} C & 0 \\ 0 & 0 \end{pmatrix} U^{*},$$

where U is an orthogonal matrix and C is an r x r nonsingular matrix. Note that if A is full rank, then A = UCU^{*}.
