= St Mark's Church School =

St Mark's School and Preschool

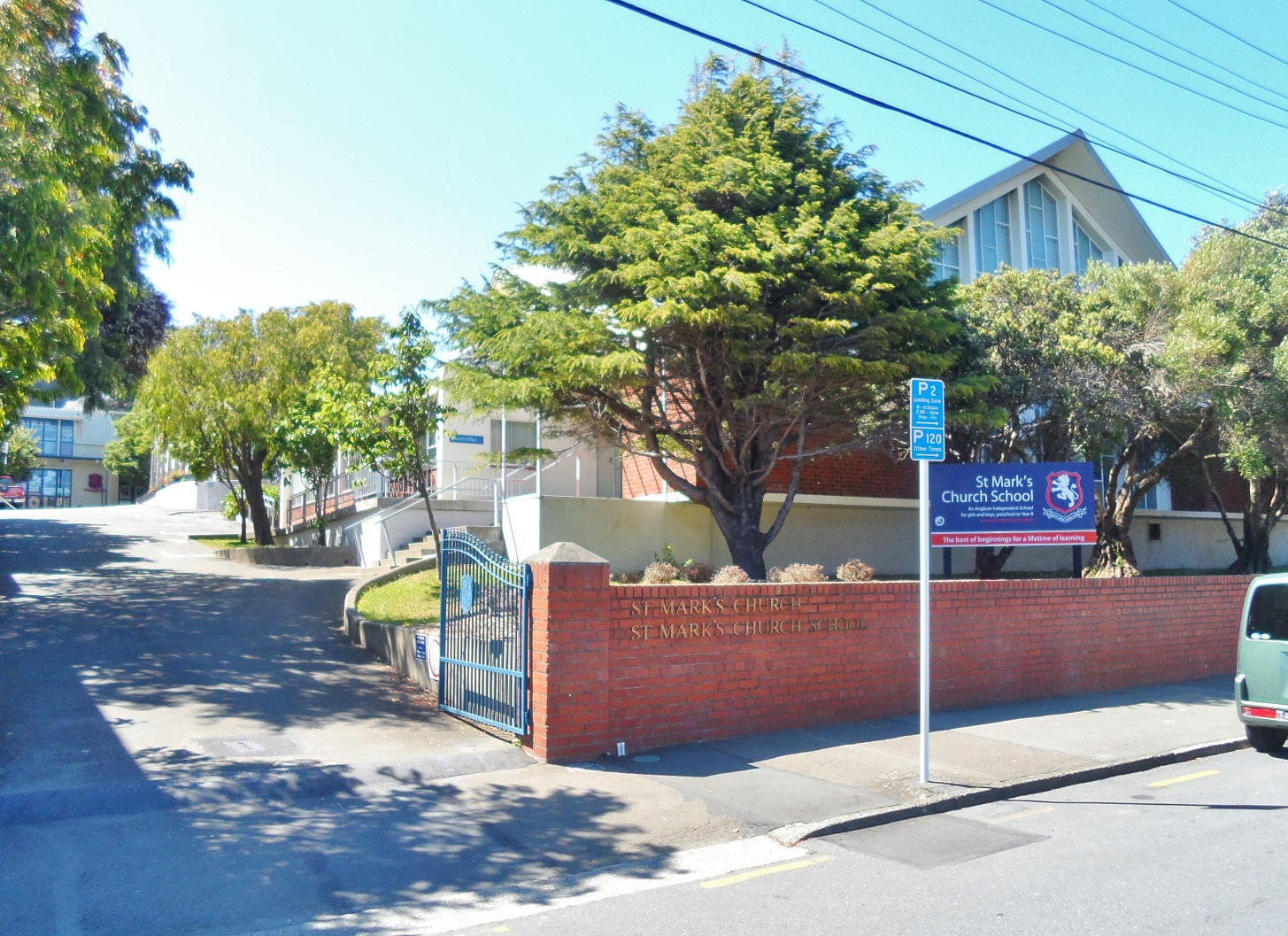

Location
- 13 Dufferin Street; Basin Reserve; Wellington 6021; New Zealand; 41.3014°S 174.7820°E

Information
- Type: Private, Independent Christian school
- Motto: Latin: Nulla Dies Sine Linea (Make your mark every day)
- Denomination: Anglican Church in Aotearoa, New Zealand and Polynesia
- Established: 11 September 1917
- Ministry of Education Institution no.: 4134
- Principal: Betty Brown
- Staff: 46
- Grades: Preschool - Year 8
- Gender: Coeducational
- Enrolment: 133 (July 2026)
- Socio-economic decile: 10
- Website: www.st-marks.school.nz

St Mark's School is an independent Anglican co-educational school in Wellington, New Zealand for children aged from two (Early Childhood) to Year 8. The school is often seen on cricket match broadcasts from Basin Reserve. To its front is the modern, 1970s-era church building, the parish church to which the school is attached. A wooden church stood in its place prior to the 1970s redevelopment.

Its first principal was Miss Annie Holm, who served the school until the 1940s, aided by her sister. The school's library is named after her. The Rev Ronald Kirby was another long-serving and influential principal, from 1971 to his death in 1982; the school's main block is named in his honour. The vicar of St. Mark's Church, Rev. Matthew Calder, taught Religious Education for all that time, and presided over Rev. Kirby's funeral; another block is named the Calder Block for him.

== Notable alumni ==
- Raybon Kan — comedian
- Karl Urban — actor
- Ray Wallace — Mayor of Lower Hutt
