= Heath Franklin =

Australian comedian

- Born: 23 December 1980 (age 45); Sydney, Australia
- Notable work: The Ronnie Johns Half Hour, Chopper Read impersonation

Comedy career
- Years active: 2005–present
- Genres: Sketch comedy, stand up

Heath Franklin (born 23 December 1980) is an Australian comedic performer, improviser and writer.

== Career ==
Franklin has appeared on The Ronnie Johns Half Hour sketch comedy show, ABC TV's Spicks and Specks, Working Dog's Thank God You're Here and in New Zealand, on 7 Days. He also appeared in the show Randling with teammate Felicity Ward in the Ducks of War team.

He is best known for his impersonation of the Australian criminal Mark "Chopper" Read.

In 2010, Franklin starred in the New Zealand crime comedy film Predicament.

== Career appearances ==
=== TV appearances ===
==== As 'stage persona', "Chopper Read" ====
- Network Ten The Christmas Panel special (2006)
- The Comedy Channel's Stand Up Australia (2007).
- The Comedy Channel's Cracker Festival Gala (2008)
- C4's Jono's New Show, New Zealand (2009)
- The Comedy Channel's Sydney Comedy Festival Gala, (2009)
- Network 10's 9am with David & Kim (2009)
- The Comedy Channel's Make Deadshits History - Pentridge Interstituals (2009)
- ABC's Spicks and Specks Xmas Special - "A Very Specky Christmas" (2009)
- TV3's Aotearoha-ha Christmas Comedy Gala (NZ) (2009)
- The Comedy Channel's Sydney Comedy Festival Cracker Gala (2010–11)
- TV3's New Zealand Comedy Festival Gala (2010, 2011 and 2024)
- C4's Jono's New Show, New Zealand (2012)
- TV3's 7 Days (NZ) (2009–present, Recurring Panelist)
- 10's Chopper's Republic Of Anzakistan, Australia (2016, Live Show with skits added for TV)

==== As himself ====
- The Ronnie Johns Half Hour, (2005–06) writer; performer
- Network 10's 9am with David & Kim (2008)
- ABC's Spicks and Specks (2008, two episodes)
- ABC's Spicks and Specks "A Very Specky Christmas" 2008 Christmas special (2008)
- Network 10/Roving Enterprises' The 7pm Project (2009)
- Channel Seven/Working Dog's Thank God You're Here (2009)
- C4's Wanna-Ben (NZ) (2012)
- ABC's Randling (2012, 6 episodes)

==== As both ====
- Network 10/Southern Star's The Spearman Experiment (2009)
- Review with Myles Barlow (2010)

=== Film appearances ===
- Predicament, a 2010 film (directed by Jason Stutter) − Mervyn Toebuck

=== Radio appearances ===
- Triple M Merrick & Australia (2015-)

== Awards and nominations ==
In 2006, Franklin was nominated for the inaugural Graham Kennedy Logie Award for "Most Outstanding New Talent" for his work on The Ronnie Johns Half Hour. He has also performed warm-up for the Logies.

=== ARIA Music Awards ===
The ARIA Music Awards are an annual awards ceremony presented by the Australian Recording Industry Association (ARIA) which recognise excellence, innovation and achievement across all genres of the music of Australia. They commenced in 1987.

Year	Nominee / work	Award	Result	Ref.
2010	Heath Franklin's Chopper: Make Deadsh*ts History	Best Comedy Release	Nominated	
