= Mate Jakich =

- Born: Mate Ivan Joseph Jakich; 31 March 1940 Ōtorohanga, New Zealand
- Died: 2 March 2010 (aged 69) Takapuna, New Zealand
- School: St Peter's College

Rugby union career
- Position: Loose forward
Provincial / State sides
Years	Team	Apps	(Points)
	Auckland	61	

Mate Ivan Joseph Jakich (31 March 1940 – 2 March 2010) was a New Zealand rugby union player who represented Auckland as a loose forward.

== Biography ==
Jakich was born in Ōtorohanga in 1940, and educated at St Peter's College. He played rugby for his school as a student in the 1950s and later in life, as an old boy, despite the onset of a serious arthritic condition, he coached the St Peter's College 1st XV alongside Brother John Prendergast during the 1970s.

Jakich played rugby for the University of Auckland as a student. He played "hundreds" of games for the Marist Auckland senior team and was selected by Fred Allen to represent the Auckland province and played in 61 games for the Auckland team which, from 1960 to 1963, defended the Ranfurly Shield a record 25 times. Jakich's playing style was typified by his "rampaging runs". Allen observed that Jakich was strong, moved around quickly and was easily lifted in lineouts. He took part in the game, Auckland v South Africa, at Eden Park, Auckland on 30 July 1966. As a personality, Jakich was considered unforgettable and totally distinctive, full of courage and good humour.
