= Paul Reynolds (commentator) =

New Zealand commentator (1949–2010)

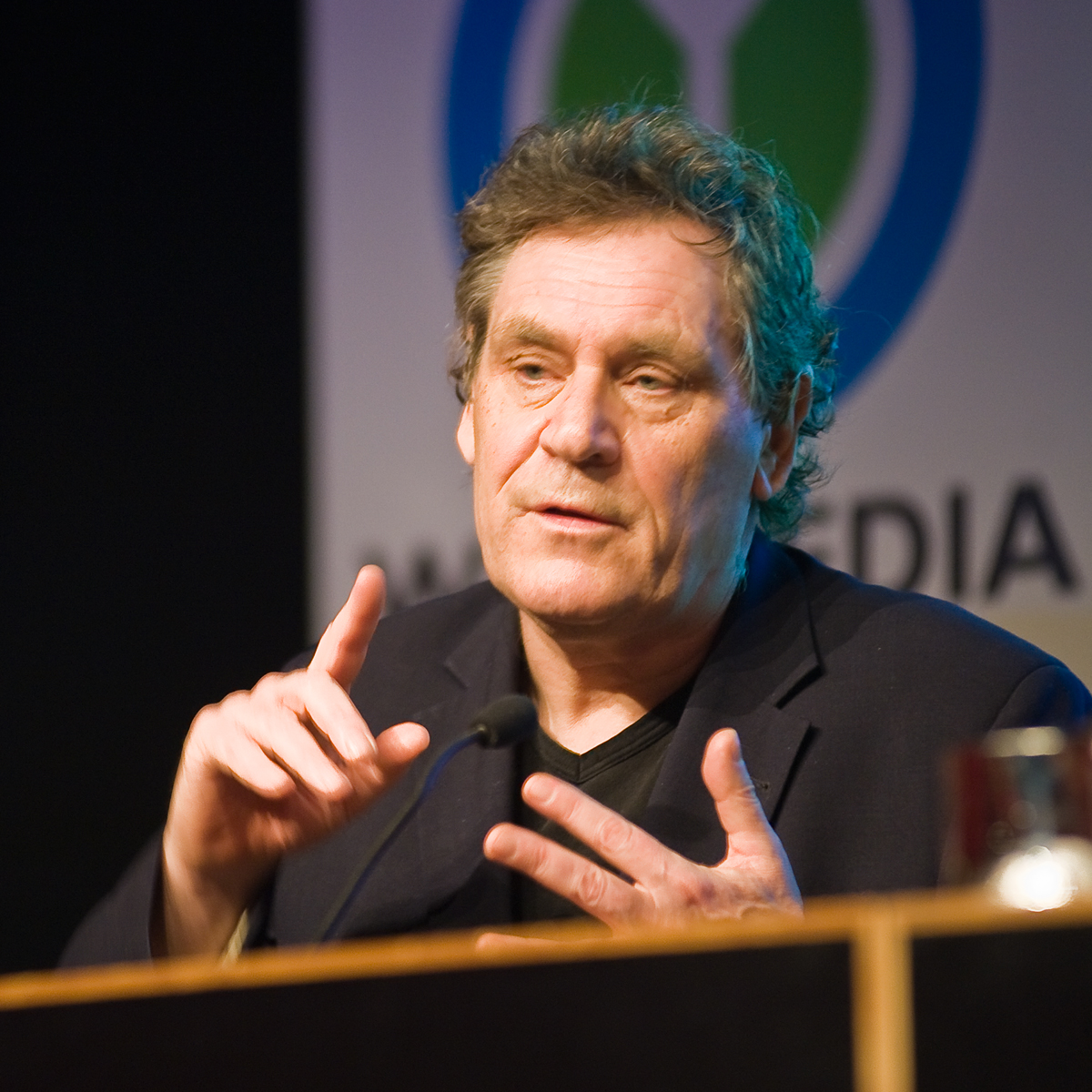
- Reynolds in 2009
- Born: Paul Séamus Reynolds; 4 October 1949; Scotland
- Died: 23 May 2010 (aged 60); Auckland, New Zealand
- Occupation: Internet commentator
- Spouse: Helen Smith
- Website: http://www.mcgovern.co.nz/

Paul Séamus Reynolds (4 October 1949 – 23 May 2010) was a New Zealand internet advocate in the cultural sector. He was an early advocate of IT systems and the Internet in the cultural sector in New Zealand.

== Biography ==
Born in Scotland on 4 October 1949, Reynolds studied at the Middlesex University, graduating with a BA in the history of ideas in 1983. He then completed an MA in social and political thought at the University of Sussex in 1988.

Reynolds moved to Auckland, working part-time in a Parnell bookshop and becoming a book reviewer. He founded McGovern Online, an internet consulting company, with his wife, Helen Smith, in 1995. For many years a commentator for Radio New Zealand on information technology, he was also an active advocate for the use of public-facing information technology by cultural institutions. He worked with libraries, museums and similar institutions to develop websites that informed, educated and engaged with the general public.

Reynolds held a number of roles, including as a member of the Governance Group of Aotearoa People's Network Kaharoa, board member of the National Digital Forum, adjunct director (Digital Library) to the National Library of New Zealand, board member of the Auckland War Memorial Museum and member of the New Zealand government’s digital strategy advisory group.

Reynolds died of leukaemia in Auckland on 23 May 2010, and was cremated at Purewa Crematorium.

== Legacy ==
In 2010 a scholarship was established in memory of Reynolds from funds contributed by the National Library of New Zealand, Internet New Zealand, and friends of Reynolds. The grant, administered by LIANZA, is known as the "Paul Reynolds (No Numpties) Grant", and allows people working in the digital space to spend time at an overseas institution to develop or research specialist digital knowledge.

=== Scholarship recipients ===
Past winners of the Paul Reynolds Scholarship are:

Year	Recipient
2011	Paul Hayton
2013	Virginia Gow
2015	Adam Moriarty
2019	Gareth Seymour
2022	Mike Dickison

== Works ==
- The Internet: A New Zealand Guide. 1995 ISBN 0-14-024838-2
- People Points Blog http://www.peoplepoints.co.nz/
- McGovern Online http://www.mcgovern.co.nz/
- Digital strategies for libraries in the 21st century podcast
- Twitter – Reynolds used @littlehigh as his Twitter account. The account was closed after his death and has since been reallocated to another user.
