= Jeffrey Thomas (actor) =

Welsh-born New Zealand actor

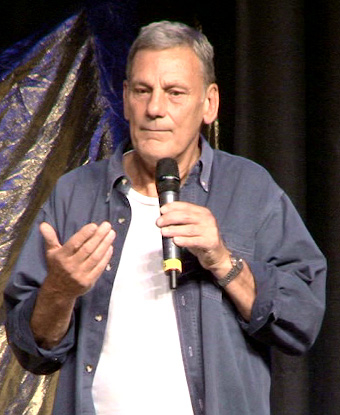
- Thomas at the Hobbitcon III convention in Bonn, Germany on 5 April 2015
- Born: 1945 (age 80–81); Llanelli, Wales, U.K.
- Occupation: Actor
- Years active: 1979–present

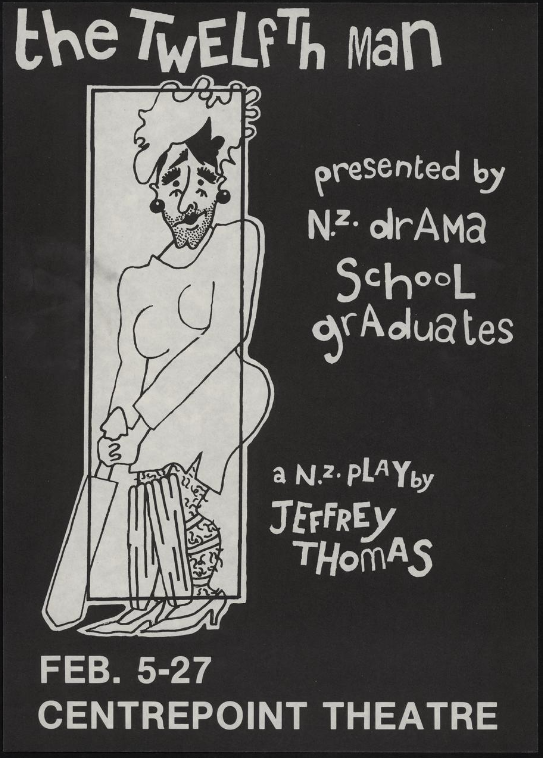
'The Twelfth Man' by Jeffrey Thomas performed at Centrepoint Theatre, Palmerston North

Jeffrey Thomas (born 1945) is a Welsh-born New Zealand actor and writer, best known for his film, television and stage roles.

== Early life ==
Thomas was born in Llanelli, Wales, to a fluent Welsh-speaking family. His grandmother's interest in drama awakened an early interest in acting. After leaving school he trained as a quantity surveyor, but grew bored with office work. He attended Liverpool University, completing a BA in English Literature and in Celtic Studies and English Literature. While at university he began writing and acting in university revues. He continued his studies at Oxford University, gaining a Master of Letters (M.Litt) degree.

While at Oxford, Thomas met and married a New Zealander, and after completing his studies they moved initially to Australia (where he lectured at La Trobe University) and then, in 1976, to Wellington. Here he taught romantic and Victorian poetry at Victoria University, before becoming a fulltime actor and writer the following year.

== Acting career ==
Thomas's first stage work was in university revues while at Oxford. He took up acting again after moving to New Zealand, where he appeared in various productions at Unity Theatre, Downstage, and Circa Theatres, before gaining a television role in early New Zealand soap opera Close to Home, in which he played Gerry, an ex-patriate London barman for 18 months.

Thomas rose to prominence in New Zealand in the late 1980s with the lead role of Inspector "Sharky" Finn in the TVNZ police drama series Shark in the Park, and is also well known for his roles in two long-running New Zealand soap operas, Mercy Peak and Shortland Street, and his distinctive voice can be heard narrating a large number of documentaries. His central role of Dr William Kingsley in Mercy Peak led to him winning the Best Actor award at the 2003 New Zealand Film and Television Awards.

Internationally, Thomas is known for his starring roles of Jason in Hercules: The Legendary Journeys and narrator in Costa Botes's and Peter Jackson's mockumentary Forgotten Silver.

Thomas also starred as Titus Lentulus Batiatus on the Starz series Spartacus: Gods of the Arena. Thomas reunited with Peter Jackson in The Hobbit, in which he played the Dwarf King Thrór. In 2015 Thomas starred in The Dead Room as Scott Cameron, a sceptical scientist investigating paranormal activity in a New Zealand farmhouse.

Plays that Thomas has appeared in include The Balcony by Jean Genet for Downstage Theatre (1977) and Mauritius by Theresa Rebeck at Circa Theatre (2010).

== Writing ==
Thomas has written several plays, both in English and in Welsh. His first success came with Playing the Game, which premiered at Circa Theatre and was eventually throughout Wales and in London's West End. Thomas was the co-winner of the 1981 Play for Wales competition, run by the Welsh Academy, with Men of Steel.
