= Pallet on the Floor =

- Directed by: Lynton Butler
- Written by: Ronald Hugh Morrieson (novel); Martyn Sanderson (screen) & Lynton Butler, Robert Rising
- Produced by: Larry Parr
- Starring: Bruce Spence; Marshall Napier; John Bach; Bruno Lawrence; Terence Cooper; Peter Rowley; Ian Watkin
- Cinematography: Kevin Hayward
- Music by: Bruno Lawrence (musical director & composer); Jonathan Crayford & Barry Johnstone (composer-arrangers)
- Release date: 1986
- Running time: 88 min.
- Language: English

Pallet on the Floor is a 1986 New Zealand made comedy-drama film, based on the final novel by Ronald Hugh Morrieson. Shot in 1983 at Pātea, partly in a closed-down abattoir, the film was given limited release in New Zealand three years later.

The main role of abattoir worker Sam Jamieson is played by veteran actor Peter McCauley.

Pallet on the Floor is the only feature film directed by Lynton Butler, who earlier made One of those Blighters, a television production which fictionalised Morrieson's life.

Actor and musician Bruno Lawrence contributed to the jazz score, and has a small cameo role playing Morrieson as a bass player at a wedding.

The focus of the plot was shifted to the character of the British remittance man in the hope that Peter O’Toole would take the role. This did not occur. While billed as comedy, the film depicts 1960s racism and class divisions, and maintains Morrieson's trademark preoccupations .... of sex, death, mateship, voyeurism, violence, booze and mayhem in bleak small town New Zealand.

== Plot ==
Life was hard enough for Sam Jamieson without Jack Voot's lechery and Miriam Breen's jealousy. Then life at Kurikino erupted into a sensation of murder and blackmail, turning his life into a nightmare from which the efforts of Tinny Entwistle, Gigglejuice Saunders and the Remittance Man could not save him. But Spud McGhee had an idea .... . Sam never gets round to working on his cottage, he goes to the Brian Boru the only hotel in Kurikino, run by Amos Blennerhasset. Wife Sue is pregnant. Sam works at 'the big slaughter-house across the bridge at the foot of the hill' known as 'the Works'.

== Cast ==
- Peter McCauley as Sam Jamieson
- Jillian O'Brien as Sue Jamieson
- Bruce Spence as Basil Beaumont-Foster (the Remittance Man)
- Shirley Gruar as Miriam Breen
- Alastair Douglas as Stan Breem
- Tony Barry as Larkman (the cop)
- Jeremy Stephens as Spud McGhee
- Michael Wilson as Shorty Larsen
- Terence Cooper as Brendon O'Keefe
- John Bach as Jack Voot
- Marshall Napier as Joe Voot
- Curly del Monte as Mason Voot
- Peter Rowley as Henderson
- Ian Watkin as Amos
- Sonny Waru as Mohi Te Kiri
- John Rist as Gigglejuice Saunders
- Bruno Lawrence as Ronald Hugh Morrieson
