= Tongan Ninja =

2002 film by Jason Stutter

- Directed by: Jason Stutter
- Written by: Jemaine Clement and Jason Stutter
- Produced by: Andrew Calder & Jason Stutter
- Starring: Sam Manu; Jemaine Clement; Lisa Tseng; Raybon Kan; David Fane; Victor Rodger
- Music by: Plan 9 Jemaine Clement; Bret McKenzie
- Production companies: Warner Bros. Village Roadshow Pictures
- Distributed by: Anchor Bay Entertainment (US); High Fliers Distribution (UK); Magna Pacific (AUS & NZ); Showtime Australia (Australia); Wild Pictures and Wild Side Vidéo (France)
- Release dates: 2 November 2002 (North America); 18 January 2006 (France)
- Running time: 83 minutes
- Country: New Zealand
- Language: English
- Budget: NZ$80,000

Tongan Ninja is a 2002 kung-fu action comedy film directed by Jason Stutter and filmed in New Zealand. The film garnered notoriety at the time for co-starring and being co-written by Jemaine Clement, star of the HBO comedy Flight of the Conchords. The film is a parody of English-dubbed martial arts films, with a plot heavily based on Way of the Dragon. It also features songs written by Jemaine Clement and Flight of the Conchords co-star Bret McKenzie.

== Plot ==
A young child is stranded in Tonga when his plane crashes and his father is eaten by piranhas. There, he trains in a dojo until he earns the name Tongan Ninja. The Tongan Ninja is dispatched to the island nation of New Zealand in order to help the brother of his master with his floundering Chinese restaurant. But the mysterious Mister Big stands in the eatery's way as he sends numerous villains such as Knife Man, Gun Man, and Action Fighter to keep the restaurant closed and the employees in fear. The Tongan Ninja must travel to Mr. Big's ninja headquarters at the So-Called-Syndicate to put a stop to his criminal empire once and for all.

== Cast ==
- Sam Manu as Tongan Ninja (Sione Finau)
- Jemaine Clement as Action Fighter (Marvin)
- Linda Tseng as Miss Lee
- Raybon Kan as Asian Sidekick
- David Fane as Herman the Henchman
- Victor Rodger as Mr. Big
- Charley Murphy Samau as Tongan Ninja Child
- Brett Ormsby as Chang the waiter
- Marty Pine as Wong
- Tana Umaga as Famous rugby player

== DVD ==
The special features section includes a "making of" segment including director's commentary, and cameos by famous New Zealand directors Peter Jackson and Andrew Adamson.
