= Tim Chadwick =

New Zealand artist and writer (1962–2010)

- Born: October 4, 1962; Hāwera, New Zealand
- Died: March 17, 2010 (aged 47); Piopio, New Zealand
- Known for: Mixed media paintings; non-fiction writing
- Children: 2

Timothy John Chadwick (4 October 1962 – 17 March 2010) was a New Zealand artist, motoring enthusiast and author. His mixed media paintings have been exhibited at the Govett-Brewster Art Gallery, New Plymouth, the Manawatu Art Gallery in Palmerston North, and dealer galleries in Auckland and Wellington, as well as at the Lincoln Center, New York and in Australia and the United Kingdom. His paintings are held in the Massey University collection, the James Wallace collection of New Zealand art and several private collections in San Francisco, Melbourne, London and throughout New Zealand.

Chadwick had also had more than a dozen non-fiction books published, including Tractors in New Zealand and Saloon Motorsport in New Zealand. He turned to writing after suffering "artist's block", and his first books featured paintings of the cars they discussed. He also wrote for NZ Classic Car magazine, a local New Zealand newspaper and occasionally New Zealand Truck and Driver magazine. His artwork often had crossovers with his motoring writing, for example, a major series of work created in the late-1980s and early-1990s was painted on second hand car bonnets (hoods). A later work featured Abel Tasman, an Austin Tasman car and the now extinct thylacine (Tasmanian tiger).

== Life ==
Chadwick was born in Hāwera, South Taranaki in 1962. In his formative art years Chadwick was taught by artists Cliff Whiting, Paul Dibble and Frank Davis.

In the early 1990s he led a group known as the Scarecrow Committee who unsuccessfully campaigned to prevent KFC from bulldozing the Hāwera house of New Zealand author Ronald Hugh Morrieson and replacing it with a fast food outlet. This is detailed in Julia Millen's book, Ronald Hugh Morrieson: A Biography. In 2008 Chadwick set foot in the Hāwera KFC outlet for the first time since the Morrieson house campaign of the early 1990s, at Hāwera, to read a chapter from The Scarecrow by Ronald Hugh Morrieson as part of artist Liz Allens 'One Day Sculpture' art happening.

On the 9 September 2009 ( 09 09 09 )Tim Chadwick released his own CAL postage stamp through New Zealand Post Ltd, a stamp known as the 'Pink Beetle Post' stamp, featuring a pink Volkswagen Beetle car. Only 1000 stamps were ordered and printed. Some were used on Chadwick's official First Day Cover ( FDC) which featured his caricature of pink beetle insects and a pink Beetle car. Three months later he came up with "Orange Lambretta Post" with a 50¢ stamp (CAL) illustrating the Lambretta motor scooter, and issued 100 FDC's. These rarely appear & are highly sought after.

Chadwick had two children and lived in New Plymouth. He taught art at Inglewood High School in Taranaki. He was killed on 17 March 2010 when his car failed to take a bend on State Highway 3 near Piopio.

== Bibliography ==
- The Kiwi Truckers guide to life ISBN 978-1-86950-768-8 HarperCollins, 2009
- Zephyrs and Zodiacs – A Kiwi Passion ISBN 978-1-86950-807-4 HarperCollins 2009
- Ford – A Kiwi Passion ISBN 978-1-86950-719-0 HarperCollins 2008
- Holden – A Kiwi Passion ISBN 978-1-86950-720-6 HarperCollins, 2008
- Diggers, Dumpers and Dozers – Big Machines In New Zealand ISBN 978-1-86934-105-3 Grantham House, 2008
- Motorcycles In New Zealand ISBN 1-86934-097-3 Grantham House, 2006
- Saloon Motorsport in New Zealand ISBN 978-1-86934-091-9 Grantham House, 2004
- Trucks New Zealand – Historics, Haulers & Heavies ISBN 978-1-86934-092-6 Grantham House, 2004
- Big Cars in New Zealand – English, European, American, Australian and Japanese ISBN 978-1-86934-087-2 Grantham House, 2002
- Utes & Pick-Ups in New Zealand ISBN 978-1-86934-081-0 Grantham House, 2002
- Small Cars in New Zealand – Baby Austins, Ford Prefects, Minis, VWs & More! ISBN 978-1-86934-084-1 Grantham House, 2001
- Trucking Along – A Pictorial History of Trucks in New Zealand ISBN 978-1-86934-083-4 Grantham House, 2001
- Saloon Car Racing in New Zealand – The Classic Years ISBN 978-1-86934-073-5 Grantham House, 1999
