= Peter Lorimer (mathematician) =

New Zealand mathematician (1939–2010)

- Born: Peter James Lorimer; 16 April 1939; Christchurch, New Zealand
- Died: 7 February 2010 (aged 70); Auckland, New Zealand
- Education: McGill University
- Scientific career
- Fields: Mathematics
- Workplaces: University of Canterbury, University of Auckland
- Thesis: A study of T2-groups. (1963)
- Doctoral advisor: Hans Schwerdtfeger

Peter James Lorimer (16 April 1939 – 7 February 2010) was a New Zealand mathematician. His research concerned group theory, combinatorics, and Ramsey theory.

== Academic career ==
Born in Christchurch, Lorimer did a BSc / MSc in mathematics at the University of Auckland and won a Commonwealth Scholarship to do a PhD at McGill University in Montreal, which he completed in 1963 under the supervision of Hans Schwerdtfeger. He returned to New Zealand to lecture, first at University of Canterbury and then at University of Auckland.
