= Benson =

Benson may refer to:

== Comics and animation ==
- Benson, a character in the TV series Regular Show

== Places ==
=== Geography ===
==== Canada ====
- Rural Municipality of Benson No. 35, Saskatchewan; rural municipality
- Benson, Saskatchewan; hamlet

==== United Kingdom ====
- Benson, Oxfordshire

==== United States ====
- Benson, Arizona
  - Benson (Amtrak station) in Benson, Arizona
- Benson, Illinois
- Benson, Louisiana
- Benson, Harford County, Maryland
- Benson, Howard County, Maryland
- Benson, Michigan
- Benson, Minnesota
- Benson, Nebraska, a neighborhood in Omaha, Nebraska
- Benson, New York
- Benson, North Carolina
- Benson, Pennsylvania
- Benson, Utah
- Benson, Vermont, a New England town
  - Benson (CDP), Vermont, the main village in the town
- Benson, Wisconsin
- Benson County, North Dakota
- Benson Lake (California)
- Benson State Recreation Area, a state park in Oregon
- Benson Township, Minnesota

=== Education ===
- Benson High School (disambiguation)
- Benson Idahosa University, a private Christian university in Benin City, Nigeria
- Benson Polytechnic High School, a public high school in Portland, Oregon
- Florence C. Benson Elementary School, a historic school building for African-American students, Columbia, South Carolina
- J.E. Benson Public School, a former elementary school in Windsor, Ontario, Canada
- James Benson Dudley High School, Greensboro, North Carolina
- Mount Benson Elementary School (Nanaimo), a public elementary school in Nanaimo, British Columbia
- Roanoke-Benson High School, a comprehensive high school located at 208 West High Street, in Roanoke, Illinois
- Omaha Benson High School Magnet, Benson, Nebraska

=== Structures ===
- Benson (Amtrak station), in Benson, Arizona
- Benson Block, listed on the National Register of Historic Places in Wapello County, Iowa
- Benson Building (Ottumwa, Iowa), listed on the National Register of Historic Places in Wapello County, Iowa
- Benson Hotel, in Portland, Oregon
- Benson House (disambiguation)
- Benson Tower (disambiguation)
- Benson Water Tower, water tower located on Clayton Street in Benson, Illinois

== Media and entertainment ==
- Benson (TV series), an American sitcom (1979–1986)
- "Benson, Arizona", the opening and closing theme song for the John Carpenter film Dark Star

== Litigation ==
- Baker v. Nelson, a 1971 Minnesota Supreme Court ruling that a state law limiting marriage to persons of the opposite sex did not violate the U.S. Constitution
- Benson v SA Mutual Life, a 1985 case in South African contract law, particularly in the area of claims for specific performance
- Crowell v. Benson, a 1932 United States Supreme Court case that approved the adjudication of private rights by an administrative agency, not an Article III court
- Gottschalk v. Benson, a 1972 United States Supreme Court case on the patentability of computer software or algorithms
- Pharaoh v. Benson (Montauk Point land claim), three lawsuits brought by Chief Wyandank Pharaoh, nephew of the Stephen Talkhouse

== Military ==
- Benson-class destroyer, World War II-era U.S. Navy ship class
- RAF Benson, Royal Air Force station near Benson, Oxfordshire, England

== People ==
- Benson (given name)
- Benson (surname)

== Products, companies, and brands ==
- Benson & Hedges, British brand of cigarettes
- Benson International, American custom trailer and body business belonging to International Industries
- Benson Records, American record label (1902–2001)
- Kleinwort Benson, former merchant bank based in London, sometimes known as Bensons

== Others ==
- Benson (1811 ship)
- Benson (fish), the largest common carp caught in Britain
- Benson Medal, awarded by the Royal Society of Literature
- Benson Syndicate, an American 19th-century organized crime group
- Benson's syndrome, a disease also known as posterior cortical atrophy

== See also ==
- Mount Benson (disambiguation)
- Justice Benson (disambiguation)
