= Guichen (disambiguation) =

Guichen may refer to the following:

== People ==
- Luc Urbain de Bouëxic, comte de Guichen, a French naval officer

== Places ==
=== Australia ===
- Guichen Bay, a bay in South Australia
  - Guichen Bay Conservation Park, a protected area in South Australia

=== France ===
- Guichen, a commune in northwestern France
- Canton of Guichen, a canton in northwestern France

== Ships ==
- French ship Guichen, two ships of the French navy.
