= List of United States tornadoes from July to September 2012 =

This is a list of all tornadoes that were confirmed by local offices of the National Weather Service in the United States from July to September 2012.

== United States yearly total ==
Confirmed tornadoes by Enhanced Fujita rating
EFU	EF0	EF1	EF2	EF3	EF4	EF5	Total
0	583	241	94	26	4	0	939

== July ==
Confirmed tornadoes by Enhanced Fujita rating
EFU	EF0	EF1	EF2	EF3	EF4	EF5	Total
0	25	10	0	0	0	0	35

=== July 3 event ===
List of confirmed tornadoes – Tuesday, July 3, 2012 (Note: All dates are based on the local time zone where the tornado touched down; however, all times are in Coordinated Universal Time for consistency.)
EF#	Location	County	State	Start Coord.	Time (UTC)	Path length	Summary
EF0	ENE of Chappell	Deuel	NE	41.13°N 102.36°W	01:51	0.5 mi (0.80 km)	Brief touchdown with no damage.

=== July 4 event ===
List of confirmed tornadoes – Wednesday, July 4, 2012
EF#	Location	County	State	Start Coord.	Time (UTC)	Path length	Max width	Summary
EF1	Blue Grass area	Wadena	MN	46.57°N 95.03°W	02:05	4 mi (6.4 km)	100 yd (91 m)	Numerous trees and power poles were downed, a barn was shifted from its foundation, and siding and roofing was blown off of houses and farm buildings.

=== July 5 event ===
List of confirmed tornadoes – Thursday, July 5, 2012
EF#	Location	County	State	Start Coord.	Time (UTC)	Path length	Summary
EF0	ESE of Socorro	Socorro	NM	34.03°N 106.87°W	21:36	0.15 mi (0.24 km)	Brief landspout with no damage.

=== July 9 event ===
List of confirmed tornadoes – Monday, July 9, 2012
EF#	Location	County	State	Start Coord.	Time (UTC)	Path length	Summary
EF0	SE of Fort Carson	El Paso	CO	38.70°N 104.76°W	15:00	0.5 mi (0.80 km)	Brief landspout over open fields caused no damage.

=== July 10 event ===
List of confirmed tornadoes – Tuesday, July 10, 2012
EF#	Location	County	State	Start Coord.	Time (UTC)	Path length	Summary
EF0	E of Gulrock	Hyde	NC	35.42°N 76.07°W	21:40	0.15 mi (0.24 km)	Brief tornado in a field caused no damage.

=== July 12 event ===
List of confirmed tornadoes – Thursday, July 12, 2012
EF#	Location	County	State	Start Coord.	Time (UTC)	Path length	Summary
EF0	WNW of Moore Haven	Glades	FL	26.84°N 81.13°W	19:12	0.1 mi (0.16 km)	Brief touchdown in open country resulted in no damage.
EF1	NE of Reynolds	Grand Forks	ND	47.72°N 97.08°W	21:35	2.2 mi (3.5 km)	Numerous trees and power poles were downed and siding was blown off of a building at a farmstead.

=== July 13 event ===
List of confirmed tornadoes – Friday, July 13, 2012
EF#	Location	Parish	State	Start Coord.	Time (UTC)	Path length	Summary
EF0	E of Port Fourchon	Lafourche	LA	29.10°N 90.19°W	20:10	0.2 mi (0.32 km)	A waterspout moved onshore and damaged a shack and two vehicles. One person was injured when the tornado hit the shack.

=== July 14 event ===
List of confirmed tornadoes – Saturday, July 14, 2012
EF#	Location	County	State	Start Coord.	Time (UTC)	Path length	Summary
EF0	E of Onley	Accomack	VA	37.686°N 75.666°W	17:08	0.6 mi (0.97 km)	Numerous trees were downed, one of which landed on a car.

=== July 15 event ===
List of confirmed tornadoes – Sunday, July 15, 2012
EF#	Location	County	State	Start Coord.	Time (UTC)	Path length	Summary
EF0	SW of Leonardtown	St. Mary's	MD	38.22°N 76.75°W	19:24	0.2 mi (0.32 km)	Waterspout moved onshore and downed several trees. Several structures sustained shingle and siding damage.
EF0	SW of Troy	Bradford	PA	41.76°N 76.82°W	20:50	1.25 mi (2.01 km)	A roof was torn off of a garage and a few trees were downed. Shingles were blown off of homes as well.

=== July 17 event ===
List of confirmed tornadoes – Tuesday, July 17, 2012
EF#	Location	County / Parish	State	Start Coord.	Time (UTC)	Path length	Summary
EF0	WSW of Viking	St. Lucie	FL	27.52°N 80.39°W	19:22	0.2 mi (0.32 km)	Several condominiums sustained roof damage. Debris from the roofs was carried eastward and deposited on top of more condominiums and into ponds.
EF0	N of Bridgewater	Grafton	NH	43.64°N 71.76°W	22:15	0.5 mi (0.80 km)	Small waterspout on Newfound Lake resulted in no damage.
EF0	NNE of Edson	Sherman	KS	39.52°N 101.50°W	23:50	0.25 mi (0.40 km)	Brief landspout tornado with no damage.

=== July 18 event ===
List of confirmed tornadoes – Wednesday, July 18, 2012
EF#	Location	County	State	Start Coord.	Time (UTC)	Path length	Summary
EF0	S of Big Springs	Deuel	NE	41.01°N 102.07°W	20:00	0.1 mi (0.16 km)	Brief touchdown over open land resulted in no damage.
EF0	SE of Pyles Marsh	Glynn	GA	31.11°N 81.48°W	19:42	0.5 mi (0.80 km)	A brief waterspout moved over marshland and dissipated.

=== July 20 event ===
List of confirmed tornadoes – Friday, July 20, 2012
EF#	Location	Parish	State	Start Coord.	Time (UTC)	Path length	Summary
EF1	ESE of Lake Charles	Calcasieu	LA	30.19°N 93.15°W	02:24	8.9 mi (14.3 km)	Numerous trees and power lines were downed.
EF0	N of Holmwood	Calcasieu	LA	30.16°N 93.06°W	02:25	1.5 mi (2.4 km)	Numerous trees were downed, patio furniture was damaged, and an agricultural building was damaged.

=== July 21 event ===
List of confirmed tornadoes – Saturday, July 21, 2012
EF#	Location	County	State	Start Coord.	Time (UTC)	Path length	Summary
EF0	S of Noonan	Divide	ND	48.82°N 103.01°W	03:10	1.1 mi (1.8 km)	Brief touchdown with no damage.

=== July 23 event ===
List of confirmed tornadoes – Monday, July 23, 2012
EF#	Location	County	State	Start Coord.	Time (UTC)	Path length	Summary
EF1	S of Rome	Oneida	NY	43.19°N 75.48°W	04:02	2.05 mi (3.30 km)	Trees and power poles were downed, a house was shifted off of its foundation, and a garage was destroyed. Another house sustained damage as well.

=== July 24 event ===
List of confirmed tornadoes – Tuesday, July 24, 2012
EF#	Location	County	State	Start Coord.	Time (UTC)	Path length	Summary
EF0	NW of White Horse Beach	Plymouth	MA	41.94°N 70.57°W	20:08	0.1 mi (0.16 km)	Three waterspouts formed with one moving onshore and damaging a beach umbrella and a few awnings. A window was ripped from a building and shattered as well.
EF0	SSW of Crestline	Lincoln	NV	37.62°N 114.16°W	20:45	0.7 mi (1.1 km)	Brief tornado with no damage.
EF0	SSW of Agua Fria	Santa Fe	NM	35.62°N 106.04°W	21:57	0.16 mi (0.26 km)	Brief landspout tornado with no damage.
EF0	NNE of Woolwich	Sagadahoc	ME	43.98°N 69.76°W	23:35	0.2 mi (0.32 km)	Brief tornado downed a few trees and moved a trampoline and lawn furniture.

=== July 26 event ===
List of confirmed tornadoes – Thursday, July 26, 2012
EF#	Location	County	State	Start Coord.	Time (UTC)	Path length	Summary
EF0	NE of Coudersport	Potter	PA	41.791°N 78.011°W	15:15	0.25 mi (0.40 km)	A few trees were downed.
EF1	SSW of Corning	Steuben	NY	42.07°N 77.13°W	19:38	0.13 mi (0.21 km)	A few trees were downed, one of which landed on a house.
EF1	South Corning	Steuben	NY	42.12°N 77.02°W	19:45	2.75 mi (4.43 km)	A few trees were downed and houses suffered minor roof and siding damage.
EF1	Elmira area	Chemung	NY	42.10°N 76.92°W	20:00	9.7 mi (15.6 km)	Several structures were damaged, power poles were downed, and many trees were downed.
EF1	SE of Montrose	Susquehanna	PA	41.78°N 75.87°W	21:00	0.8 mi (1.3 km)	Tornado produced tree and structural damage.
EF1	S of Freeland	Luzerne	PA	41.01°N 75.90°W	21:44	0.1 mi (0.16 km)	Several structures were damaged or destroyed and trees were downed.

=== July 28 event ===
List of confirmed tornadoes – Saturday, July 28, 2012
EF#	Location	County	State	Start Coord.	Time (UTC)	Path length	Summary
EF0	SSE of Georgetown	Clear Creek	CO	39.58°N 105.63°W	20:45	0.1 mi (0.16 km)	Brief touchdown with no damage.

=== July 29 event ===
List of confirmed tornadoes – Sunday, July 29, 2012
EF#	Location	County	State	Start Coord.	Time (UTC)	Path length	Summary
EF1	N of Crawfordville	Wakulla	FL	30.23°N 84.40°W	22:40	2.1 mi (3.4 km)	Trees and power lines were downed and a house was damaged.

=== July 30 event ===
List of confirmed tornadoes – Monday, July 30, 2012
EF#	Location	County	State	Start Coord.	Time (UTC)	Path length	Summary
EF0	ESE of Wanchese	Dare	NC	35.81°N 75.55°W	14:40	0.5 mi (0.80 km)	Waterspout moved onshore and quickly dissipated, causing no damage.
EF0	NE of Wanchese	Dare	NC	35.83°N 75.62°W	15:01	1 mi (1.6 km)	Waterspout moved onshore and quickly dissipated, causing no damage.

=== July 31 event ===
List of confirmed tornadoes – Tuesday, July 31, 2012
EF#	Location	County	State	Start Coord.	Time (UTC)	Path length	Summary
EF0	S of Gibson City	Ford	IL	40.44°N 88.37°W	18:18	0.09 mi (0.14 km)	Very brief tornado with no damage.

== August ==
Confirmed tornadoes by Enhanced Fujita rating
EFU	EF0	EF1	EF2	EF3	EF4	EF5	Total
0	31	8	1	0	0	0	40

=== August 1 event ===
EF#	Location	County	State	Start Coord.	Time (UTC)	Path length	Summary
EF0	NNE of Kiawah Island	Charleston	SC	32.61°N 80.12°W	0017	50 yards (46 m)	Brief tornado that was photographed by various people but resulted in no damage.
Sources: SPC Storm Reports for 08/01/12, NWS Charleston, SC

=== August 3 event ===
EF#	Location	County	State	Start Coord.	Time (UTC)	Path length	Max width	Summary
EF0	SW of Redfield	Spink	SD	44.85°N 98.54°W	2245	125 yards (114 m)		Brief tornado touched down in a cornfield and resulted in no damage.
EF0	S of Conde	Spink	SD	45.11°N 98.10°W	2305	0.3 miles (480 m)		Brief, weak tornado touched down in a cornfield and resulted in no damage.
Sources: SPC Storm Reports for 08/03/12, NCDC Storm Events Database

=== August 4 event ===
EF#	Location	County	State	Start Coord.	Time (UTC)	Path length	Max width	Summary
EF1	Rolling Prairie area	LaPorte	IN	41.67°N 86.61°W	2220	1.5 miles (2.4 km)		Brief, narrow tornado destroyed a barn, a garage, and a shed. Trees and powerlines were downed as well.
Sources: SPC Storm Reports for 08/04/12, NWS Northern Indiana

=== August 5 event ===
EF#	Location	County	State	Start Coord.	Time (UTC)	Path length	Max width	Summary
EF0	Girard area	Trumbull	OH	41.15°N 80.70°W	1835	4 miles (6.4 km)		Trees were snapped and uprooted and at least four cars were damaged along an intermittent path. Minor damage occurred to roofs, chimneys, road signs, and outbuildings.
Sources: SPC Storm Reports for 08/05/12, NWS Cleveland, OH

=== August 7 event ===
EF#	Location	County	State	Start Coord.	Time (UTC)	Path length	Max width	Summary
EF0	W of Prince Frederick	Calvert	MD	38.51°N 76.66°W	2155	0.7 miles (1.1 km)		Waterspout formed over the Patuxent River and moved onshore. It resulted in no damage.
Sources: SPC Storm Reports for 08/07/12, NCDC Storm Events Database

=== August 8 event ===
EF#	Location	County	State	Start Coord.	Time (UTC)	Path length	Max width	Summary
EF0	SE of Dodge	Dodge	NE	41.66°N 96.88°W	2136	1.9 miles (3.1 km)		Tornado was photographed but resulted in no damage.
Sources: SPC Storm Reports for 08/08/12, NCDC Storm Events Database

=== August 9 event ===
EF#	Location	County	State	Start Coord.	Time (UTC)	Path length	Max width	Summary
EF0	SE of Duluth	St. Louis	MN	46.73°N 92.04°W	1611	0.25 miles (400 m)		Waterspout moved onshore at an airport where it moved two 500-pound floats.
EF0	E of Superior	Douglas	WI	46.72°N 92.05°W	1619	100 yards (91 m)		The previous tornado moved back over water, crossed the state line, and once again made landfall before dissipating. No damage was reported.
EF0	NW of Tylertown	Walthall	MS	31.18°N 90.21°W	2107	0.3 yards (0.27 m)		Brief tornado destroyed an outbuilding that housed dogs at an animal sanctuary, killing one dog and injuring several others. A large tree was uprooted, numerous large dog houses were moved, and a building on stilts was shifted off of the stilts.
Sources: SPC Storm Reports for 08/09/12, NWS Duluth, MN, NCDC Storm Evevts Database

=== August 10 event ===
EF#	Location	County	State	Start Coord.	Time (UTC)	Path length	Max width	Summary
EF0	Great River to Ronkonkoma	Suffolk	NY	40.72°N 73.16°W	1806	5.6 miles (9.0 km)		Numerous trees were twisted, snapped, or uprooted, many of which landed on homes, cars, and powerlines.
EF0	Block Island area	Washington	RI	41.15°N 71.57°W	1954	3.8 miles (6.1 km)		Waterspout moved ashore and downed many trees. Porch furniture was blown away, screens were blown off of a house, and an anemometer was damaged. There was evidence of lawn damage and a path of flattened brush was reported.
Sources: SPC Storm Reports for 08/10/12, NWS New York City, NCDC Storm Reports Database

=== August 11 event ===
EF#	Location	County	State	Start Coord.	Time (UTC)	Path length	Max width	Summary
EF1	Stantonsburg area	Wilson	NC	35.605°N 77.817°W	2109	0.2 miles (320 m)		Brief tornado caused significant roof and structural damage with one home being shifted off its foundation.
Sources: SPC Storm Reports for 08/11/12, NWS Raleigh

=== August 12 event ===
EF#	Location	County	State	Start Coord.	Time (UTC)	Path length	Max width	Summary
EF0	ESE of Perris	Riverside	CA	33.77°N 117.20°W	2230	0.5 miles (0.80 km)		Brief landspout was caught on camera and resulted in no damage.
Sources: SPC Storm Reports for 08/12/12, NWS San Diego, NCDC Storm Events Database

=== August 19 event ===
EF#	Location	County	State	Start Coord.	Time (UTC)	Path length	Max width	Summary
EF0	NE of Rodanthe	Dare	NC	35.61°N 75.47°W	1819	50 yards (46 m)		A waterspout moved ashore and caused no damage.
EF0	WNW of Goshen Springs	Rankin	MS	32.49°N 89.98°W	2345	200 yards (180 m)		A waterspout developed over Ross Barnett Reservoir and caused no damage.
Sources: SPC Storm Reports for 08/19/12, NCDC Storm Events Database

=== August 21 event ===
EF#	Location	County	State	Start Coord.	Time (UTC)	Path length	Max width	Summary
EF0	WSW of Newhouse	Beaver	UT	38.28°N 114.04°W	2011	125 yards (114 m)		Sheriff reported a brief touchdown along the Utah/Nevada border that caused no known damage.
EF0	E of Beach City	Chambers	TX	29.67°N 94.88°W	2250	0.4 miles (0.64 km)		A waterspout moved inland and caused no damage.
Sources: SPC Storm Reports for 08/21/12, NCDC Storm Events Database

=== August 23 event ===
EF#	Location	County	State	Start Coord.	Time (UTC)	Path length	Max width	Summary
EF0	SE of Sheridan Lake	Kiowa	CO	38.43°N 102.24°W	2323	0.9 miles (1.4 km)		A landspout touched down in farm fields and caused no damage.
EF0	NW of Norwood Young America	Carver	MN	44.81°N 94.00°W	0143	3.2 miles (5.1 km)		A weak tornado damaged corn and downed trees. It also destroyed a barn, killing 12 cows.
Sources: SPC Storm Reports for 08/23/12, NCDC Storm Events Database

=== August 26 event ===
EF#	Location	County	State	Start Coord.	Time (UTC)	Path length	Summary
EF0	Greencastle area	Franklin	PA	39.81°N 77.75°W	1756	6 miles (9.7 km)	A barn and a house had their roofs removed and a farm wagon was moved. Trees and crops were downed as well.
Sources: SPC Storm Reports for 08/26/12, NWS State College, PA

=== August 27 event ===
List of confirmed tornadoes - Monday, August 27, 2012
EF#	Location	County / Parish	State	Coord.	Time (UTC)	Path length	Max width	Damage (Note: All monetary values are in 2012 United States dollars unless otherwise stated.)	Summary
EF0	S of Narcoossee	Osceola	FL	28.27°N 81.22°W	0709 – 0710	0.83 mi (1.34 km)	30 yd (27 m)	$15,000	An abandoned mobile home was destroyed and shingles were removed from a mobile home. Another home had a broken window and shrub and fence damage on the property. The tornado also passed through citrus groves, knocking down several trees.
EF0	W of Vero Beach	Indian River	FL	27.63°N 80.5°W	1603 – 1605	1.61 mi (2.59 km)	180 yd (160 m)	$500,000	A weak tornado on a discontinuous path caused damage to 95 structures, most of which were mobile homes. Approximately 62 received minor damage with an additional 33 sustaining major damage. Carports and awnings were damaged as well.
EF0	ESE of Tampa	Hillsborough	FL	27.94°N 82.43°W	2044 – 2045	0.04 mi (0.064 km)	20 yd (18 m)	$2,000	A waterspout moved ashore and damaged fences, trees, and roofs at six residences.

=== August 29 event ===
List of confirmed tornadoes - Wednesday, August 29, 2012
EF#	Location	County / Parish	State	Coord.	Time (UTC)	Path length	Max width	Damage	Summary
EF0	NE of Greenwood	Jackson	FL	30.88°N 85.15°W	2212 – 2214	0.37 mi (0.60 km)	25 yd (23 m)	$0	Brief tornado in an open area as documented on video; no damage.
EF1	SSW of Gulfport	Harrison	MS	30.37°N 89.08°W	2218 – 2221	0.5 mi (0.80 km)	25 yd (23 m)	$25,000	A tornado destroyed a home that was under construction and collapsed the roof of a front porch to a separate house. Several trees were downed.
EF0	N of Graceville	Holmes	FL	30.99°N 85.51°W	2224 – 2225	0.27 mi (0.43 km)	25 yd (23 m)	$10,000	The front porch was torn away from a mobile home and numerous trees were downed.
EF1	S of Ocean Springs	Jackson	MS	30.36°N 88.75°W	0014 – 0016	0.43 mi (0.69 km)	40 yd (37 m)	$40,000	Several roofs were damaged and windows were blown out. A few trees were downed as well.

=== August 30 event ===
List of confirmed tornadoes - Thursday, August 30, 2012
EF#	Location	County / Parish	State	Coord.	Time (UTC)	Path length	Max width	Damage	Summary
EF1	N of Lowery	Geneva, Coffee	AL	31.19°N 86.14°W	0744 – 0748	2.97 mi (4.78 km)	35 yd (32 m)	$25,000	Several large trees were knocked down and the roof was torn from a mobile home. Several sheds and a barn were damaged.
EF2	SW of Pascagoula	Jackson	MS	30.34°N 88.55°W	1210 – 1212	0.77 mi (1.24 km)	40 yd (37 m)	$75,000	Impact to homes was largely confined to minor structural damage, with the exception of one home that lost the entirety of its roof. Trees were downed.
EF1	WSW of Creek	Clarke	MS	31.99°N 88.5°W	1449 – 1456	6.1 mi (9.8 km)	100 yd (91 m)	$100,000	Several structures were either damaged or destroyed, including numerous outbuildings and two mobile homes. Light poles, trees, and a fence were downed as well.
EF1	E of Increase	Lauderdale	MS	32.24°N 88.53°W	1518 – 1521	1.4 mi (2.3 km)	100 yd (91 m)	$70,000	Two barns were damaged, two sheds were blown into a pond, and a tree fell on another shed. Numerous trees were snapped or uprooted.
EF0	E of Toxey	Choctaw	AL	31.9°N 88.28°W	1558 – 1600	0.01 mi (0.016 km)	50 yd (46 m)	$5,000	A few trees were downed.

=== August 31 event ===
List of confirmed tornadoes - Friday, August 31, 2012
EF#	Location	County	State	Coord.	Time (UTC)	Path length	Max width	Damage	Summary
EF0	ENE of Fieldon	Jersey	IL	39.11°N 90.47°W	1936 – 1937	0.18 mi (0.29 km)	40 yd (37 m)	Unknown	Minor damage was inflicted to crops and a residence. Trees surrounding the house were snapped off.
EF0	NW of Saint Thomas	Madison	IL	38.78°N 90.13°W	1950 – 1951	0.2 mi (0.32 km)	50 yd (46 m)	$0	A brief tornado touchdown; no reported damage.
EF0	Carrollton area	Greene	IL	39.28°N 90.41°W	2027 – 2030	1.44 mi (2.32 km)	60 yd (55 m)	Unknown	A garage and a storage shed sustained major damage. A home sustained minor roof damage and many trees and power poles were downed.
EF1	Franklin area	Morgan	IL	39.61°N 90.04°W	2027 – 2030	0.25 mi (0.40 km)	75 yd (69 m)	$230,000	A brief tornado destroyed a repair shop, damaged the roof of a house, and rolled a mobile home off its foundation. Several trees were downed.
EF0	NW of Franklin	Morgan	IL	39.64°N 90.09°W	2232 – 2233	0.16 mi (0.26 km)	10 yd (9.1 m)	$0	A brief tornado touchdown in an open field; no reported damage.
EF0	NNE of O'Fallon	St. Charles	MO	38.82°N 90.67°W	2234 – 2235	0.4 mi (0.64 km)	120 yd (110 m)	Unknown	A tornado struck Fort Zumwalt North High School where it downed several trees, blew debris onto the tennis court, broke the window out of a nearby truck, knocked over a set of standalone aluminum bleachers at the football field, and blew soccer goals against a line of trees. It then left the high school property and knocked down several more trees, blew playground equipment from a preschool into a parking lot, and knocked over a small set of bleachers and a portion of a 4-foot high chain-link fence that surrounded a nearby baseball diamond.

== September ==
Confirmed tornadoes by Enhanced Fujita rating
EFU	EF0	EF1	EF2	EF3	EF4	EF5	Total
0	33	4	2	0	0	0	39

=== September 1 event (Mississippi Valley) ===
List of confirmed tornadoes - Saturday, September 1, 2012
EF#	Location	County	State	Coord.	Time (UTC)	Path length	Max width	Damage	Summary
EF0	ESE of Benson	Woodford	IL	40.84°N 89.09°W	1648 – 1649	0.06 mi (0.097 km)	20 yd (18 m)	$0	A brief tornado touchdown in an open field; no reported damage.
EF0	N of Benson	Woodford	IL	40.89°N 89.12°W	1703 – 1704	0.69 mi (1.11 km)	20 yd (18 m)	$0	A brief tornado touchdown in an open field; no reported damage.
EF0	NNW of Benson	Woodford, Marshall	IL	40.9°N 89.15°W	1705 – 1709	2.25 mi (3.62 km)	75 yd (69 m)	$5,000	The tornado pulled the tin roof from a shed and damaged a corn field.
EF0	S of Sparland	Marshall	IL	40.96°N 89.45°W	1732 – 1733	0.09 mi (0.14 km)	20 yd (18 m)	$0	A brief tornado touchdown; no reported damage.
EF0	ESE of Wyoming	Stark	IL	41.05°N 89.69°W	1808 – 1811	1.3 mi (2.1 km)	50 yd (46 m)	$0	A brief tornado touchdown in an open field; no reported damage.
EF0	SE of Castleton	Stark	IL	41.08°N 89.65°W	1811 – 1814	1.1 mi (1.8 km)	20 yd (18 m)	$0	A brief tornado touchdown; no reported damage.
EF0	W of Modena	Stark	IL	41.12°N 89.77°W	1824 – 1826	0.94 mi (1.51 km)	50 yd (46 m)	$0	A brief tornado touchdown in an open field; no reported damage.
EF2	N of Corning	Clay	AR	36.41°N 90.65°W	2119 – 2121	0.9 mi (1.4 km)	75 yd (69 m)	$5,050,000	Two hangars at Corning Municipal Airport sustained extensive damage and a few others sustained minor damage. Several aircraft were damaged severely and several power poles were downed. Two homes had windows blown out and the roof of a shed was blown off.
EF0	N of Corning	Clay	AR	36.45°N 90.59°W	2122 – 2123	0.06 mi (0.097 km)	25 yd (23 m)	$5,000	A brief tornado touchdown in a farm field.
EF0	NW of Fisk	Butler	MO	36.8°N 90.29°W	2132 – 2139	2.95 mi (4.75 km)	20 yd (18 m)	$0	A well-documented tornado stayed over open farm country and produced no known damage.
EF0	E of Qulin	Butler	MO	36.6°N 90.25°W	2143 – 2148	4.29 mi (6.90 km)	20 yd (18 m)	$0	The tornado remained over open farm country; no reported damage.
EF0	SSE of Bucoda	Butler	MO	36.09°N 90.21°W	2303 – 2304	0.03 mi (0.048 km)	25 yd (23 m)	$100,000	A farm shed and the equipment inside was damaged by the tornado.
EF0	NNE of Flackville	Marion	IN	39.79°N 86.18°W	2241 – 2242	0.01 mi (0.016 km)	25 yd (23 m)	$0	A downtown tower media camera observed a brief tornado; no reported damage.

=== September 1 event ===
EF#	Location	County	State	Start Coord.	Time (UTC)	Path length	Summary
EF0	E of Declo	Cassia	ID	42.52°N 113.56°W	2220	1 mile (1.6 km)	Tornado was photographed by a storm spotter. It occurred over open land and caused no damage.
EF0	ENE of Albion	Cassia	ID	42.44°N 113.50°W	2240	1 mile (1.6 km)	Weak tornado was photographed by a storm spotter. It occurred over open land and caused no damage.

=== September 3 event ===
List of confirmed tornadoes - Monday, September 3, 2012
EF#	Location	County	State	Coord.	Time (UTC)	Path length	Max width	Damage	Summary
EF0	S of Wyoming	Kent	DE	39.1°N 75.56°W	1920 – 1921	0.21 mi (0.34 km)	35 yd (32 m)	$100,000	Several houses were damaged, the roof was torn off of a garage, and two vehicles were damaged.

=== September 4 event ===
EF#	Location	County	State	Start Coord.	Time (UTC)	Path length	Max width	Summary
EF0	Mount Ephraim area	Camden	NJ	39.88°N 75.1°W	2231 – 2232	0.16 mi (0.26 km)	25 yd (23 m)	Brief but strong tornado caused significant damage to a house, a barn, and some outbuildings. Numerous trees were uprooted.
EF2	Bloomington area	Grant	WI	42.91°N 91.00°W	0037	0.7 miles (1.1 km)		Brief but strong tornado caused significant damage to a house, a barn, and some outbuildings. Numerous trees were uprooted.

=== September 8 event ===
List of reported tornadoes - Saturday, September 8, 2012
EF#	Location	County	Coord.	Time (UTC)	Path length	Comments/Damage
Ohio
EF0	WSW of Newtonsville	Clermont	39.173°N 84.144°W	0436	0.2 miles (320 m)	Brief tornado embedded in straight-line winds damaged the roofs of three homes and a garage. A porch was lifted from a home and thrown several yards as well.
New York
EF1	Breezy Point/Canarsie areas	Queens, Kings	40.55°N 73.90°W	1458	4.75 miles (7.64 km) (on land)	Waterspout moved on shore from the Atlantic Ocean and caused structural damage at the Breezy Point Surf Club. It also downed trees and power lines before moving back over water between Jamaica Bay and Lower New York Harbor. The waterspout moved ashore once again and downed several trees and damaged several homes before dissipating.
Sources: SPC Storm Reports for 09/07/12, SPC Storm Reports for 09/08/12, NWS New York City: , , NWS Wilmington, OH, NCDC Storm Events Database

=== September 9 event ===
List of reported tornadoes - Sunday, September 9, 2012
EF#	Location	County	Coord.	Time (UTC)	Path length	Comments/Damage
California
EF0	Perris area	Riverside	33.78°N 117.23°W	2120	50 yards (46 m)	A landspout was photographed but it caused no damage.
Sources: SPC Storm Reports for 09/09/12, NCDC Storm Events Database

=== September 13 event ===
List of reported tornadoes - Thursday, September 13, 2012
EF#	Location	County	Coord.	Time (UTC)	Path length	Comments/Damage
Puerto Rico
EF0	S of City of Lares	Lares	18.28°N 66.88°W	1910	75 yards (69 m)	Brief tornado with no damage.
Sources: SPC Storm Reports for 09/13/12, NCDC Storm Events Database

=== September 17 event ===
List of reported tornadoes - Monday, September 17, 2012
EF#	Location	County	Coord.	Time (UTC)	Path length	Comments/Damage
Kansas
EF0	SSE of Dover	Shawnee	38.93°N 95.90°W	2020	50 yards (46 m)	Thin landspout with no damage.
Tennessee
EF0	W of Normandy	Bedford	35.4472°N 86.3374°W	2102	1 mile (1.6 km)	Dozens of trees were downed and a house suffered roof damage.
Alabama
EF0	W of Samson	Geneva	31.11°N 86.05°W	2112	0.1 miles (160 m)	Several trees and power lines were downed. One tree fell on a house and another house suffered roof damage.
Sources: SPC Storm Reports for 09/17/12, NWS Nashville, NCDC Storm Events Database

=== September 18 event ===
List of reported tornadoes - Tuesday, September 18, 2012
EF#	Location	County	Coord.	Time (UTC)	Path length	Comments/Damage
North Carolina
EF0	NNE of Wendell	Wake	35.82°N 78.34°W	1938	0.5 miles (0.80 km)	Brief tornado damaged a stand of trees.
EF0	NNE of Comfort	Jones	35.04°N 77.46°W	2024	5 miles (8.0 km)	Intermittent tornado touched down three times. Trees and signs were damaged including two large trees that were downed. A greenhouse was destroyed, an outbuilding, shed, and vehicle were damaged, and an irrigation system was flipped.
Sources: SPC Storm Reports for 09/18/12, NWS Raleigh, NC, NWS Newport/Morehead City, NC

=== September 25 event ===
List of reported tornadoes - Tuesday, September 25, 2012
EF#	Location	County	Coord.	Time (UTC)	Path length	Comments/Damage
Colorado
EF0	S of Del Norte	Rio Grande	37.67°N 106.35°W	1955	1.4 miles (2.3 km)	A landspout tornado caused damage to several properties, including one property where a camper and a house were damaged.
Illinois
EF1	N of Okawville	Washington	38.45°N 89.55°W	2222	3.5 miles (5.6 km)	Several barns and one home suffered roof damage, one barn lost its roof and another was destroyed. Large tree limbs were downed, damaging a garage and a parked car. A tractor-trailer was blown into the median of Interstate 64, injuring the driver.
Sources: SPC Storm Reports for 09/25/12, NWS St. Louis, NCDC Storm Events Database

=== September 27 event ===
List of reported tornadoes - Thursday, September 27, 2012
EF#	Location	County	Coord.	Time (UTC)	Path length	Comments/Damage
Colorado
EF0	ENE of Greenland	Douglas	39.18°N 104.75°W	1919	0.1 miles (160 m)	Brief touchdown with no damage.
EF0	ENE of Strasburg	Adams	39.74°N 104.22°W	2128	0.1 miles (160 m)	Brief touchdown with no damage.
EF0	N of Roggen	Weld	40.20°N 104.37°W	2257	0.1 miles (160 m)	Brief touchdown with no damage.
Pennsylvania
EF0	S of Gambles	Washington	40.186°N 80.136°W	1957	1.5 miles (2.4 km)	Trees were snapped and uprooted and a car was blown onto its side. A few outbuildings were damaged, with some completely destroyed.
EF0	NNE of West Mifflin	Allegheny	40.367°N 79.864°W	2044	0.3 miles (480 m)	Several trees were downed and headstones were blown over at a cemetery. The front porch of a house was lifted and deposited onto the roof of the home.
Sources: SPC Storm Reports for 09/27/12, NWS Pittsburgh, NCDC Storm Events Database

=== September 29 event ===
List of reported tornadoes - Saturday, September 29, 2012
EF#	Location	County	Coord.	Time (UTC)	Path length	Comments/Damage
Texas
EF0	SSE of Sweet Home	Lavaca	29.34°N 97.07°W	2202	0.6 miles (0.97 km)	Small tornado caught on video damaged a playground and a gymnasium door at a school. It also downed several trees.
EF0	W of Port Lavaca	Calhoun	28.62°N 96.64°W	2211	0.1 miles (0.16 km)	Brief tornado damaged a Tractor Supply store. Gutters were ripped off the sides of the building and a rooftop air conditioning unit was flipped.
Sources: SPC Storm Reports for 09/29/12, NCDC Storm Events Database

=== September 30 event ===
List of reported tornadoes - Sunday, September 30, 2012
EF#	Location	County	Coord.	Time (UTC)	Path length	Comments/Damage
Mississippi
EF1	W of Sellers	Hancock	30.54°N 89.48°W	2020	6.1 miles (9.8 km)	Part of the roof was removed from one house and a few others roofs suffered minor damage. Another home was shifted of off its foundation. Several trees were downed as well.
EF1	McHenry area	Stone	30.71°N 89.15°W	2119	2.2 miles (3.5 km)	The roof was removed from one house and four other roofs were damaged. Several trees were downed and a wooden fence was blown down as well.
Nebraska
EF0	NNW of Arnold	Custer	41.47°N 100.23°W	2205	125 yards (114 m)	No damage was reported.
Sources: SPC Storm Reports for 09/30/12, NCDC Storm Events Database

== See also ==
- Tornadoes of 2012
- List of United States tornadoes from May to June 2012
- List of United States tornadoes from October to December 2012
