= Benson, Maryland =

Benson, Maryland may refer to:

- Benson, Harford County, Maryland, an unincorporated community in Harford County
- Benson, Howard County, Maryland, an unincorporated community in Howard County
