= List of United States tornadoes from May to June 2012 =

This is a list of all tornadoes that were confirmed by local offices of the National Weather Service in the United States from May to June 2012.

== United States yearly total ==
Confirmed tornadoes by Enhanced Fujita rating
EFU	EF0	EF1	EF2	EF3	EF4	EF5	Total
0	583	241	94	26	4	0	948

== May ==
Confirmed tornadoes by Enhanced Fujita rating
EFU	EF0	EF1	EF2	EF3	EF4	EF5	Total
0	91	20	8	2	0	0	121

=== May 1 event ===
List of reported tornadoes - Tuesday, May 1, 2012
EF#	Location	County	Coord.	Time (UTC)	Path length	Comments/Damage
Oklahoma
EF1	WSW of Nowata	Nowata	36.66°N 95.77°W	0542	6.5 miles (10.5 km)	Numerous trees were snapped or uprooted and several barns were damaged.
EF2	NE of Welch	Craig	36.89°N 95.10°W	0630	1 mile (1.6 km)	The roof was torn off of a home and another home was shifted off of the foundation. The tornado also turned over an outbuilding, rolled two horse trailers, destroyed steel framed barn, and snapped or uprooted trees.
Indiana
EF0	S of Brazil	Clay	39.33°N 87.19°W	1833	0.1 miles (160 m)	Brief touchdown with no damage.
EF1	ESE of Mt. Carmel	Franklin	39.41°N 84.86°W	2120	1.3 miles (2.1 km)	Several barns and outbuildings suffered minor to major damage and several trees were downed.
EF0	SE of Veedersburg	Fountain	40.01°N 87.19°W	2257	0.1 miles (160 m)	Brief touchdown without damage.
EF1	SE of Crawfordsville	Montgomery	39.97°N 86.78°W	2336	0.5 miles (800 m)	A barn was destroyed, a few homes were damaged, and trees and powerlines were downed.
Kentucky
EF0	WNW of Bedford	Trimble	38.61°N 85.36°W	2045	1.9 miles (3.1 km)	Several trees were snapped and a mobile home suffered minor damage.
Illinois
EF0	SE of Monticello	Piatt	39.98°N 88.49°W	2059	0.1 miles (160 m)	Brief touchdown with no damage.
EF1	NNE of Ivesdale	Champaign	39.98°N 88.44°W	2106	8 miles (13 km)	Three homes were damaged and a chicken house was destroyed.
EF0	W of Sidney	Champaign	40.02°N 88.08°W	2140	0.1 miles (160 m)	Brief touchdown with no damage.
EF0	SE of Tilton	Vermillion	40.09°N 87.64°W	2218	0.5 miles (800 m)	A carport was picked up and thrown into several campers and other trailers.
Minnesota
EF0	S of Padua	Stearns	45.56°N 95.06°W	2156	0.9 miles (1.4 km)	Brief tornado with no damage.
EF0	S of Elrosa	Stearns	45.55°N 94.98°W	2202	2.1 miles (3.4 km)	A mobile home was destroyed, a garage door was damaged, and many trees were downed.
EF0	SE of Enfield	Wright	45.35°N 93.91°W	2202	50 yards (46 m)	Brief tornado kicked up some dust before dissipating.
Ohio
EF0	W of Lebanon	Warren	39.44°N 84.23°W	2220	20 yards (18 m)	Very brief tornado damaged a house and a car.
EF0	N of Lebanon	Warren	39.47°N 84.19°W	2224	50 yards (46 m)	About a dozen trees were uprooted with this brief touchdown.
Iowa
EF0	E of Moneta to S of Everly	Clay	43.13°N 95.37°W	0240	2.6 miles (4.2 km)	A few power poles were downed.
Sources: SPC Storm Reports for 04/30/12, SPC Storm Reports for 05/01/12, NWS Louisville, NWS Tulsa, NWS Wilmington, OH, NWS Central Illinois, NWS Indianapolis: , , NCDC Storm Events Database

=== May 2 event ===
List of reported tornadoes - Wednesday May 2, 2012
EF#	Location	County	Coord.	Time (UTC)	Path length	Comments/Damage
Pennsylvania
EF0	Ayers Hill	Potter	41.73°N 77.97°W	0115	0.5 miles (0.80 km)	A large trailer was overturned, damaging two vehicles. The roofs of four homes were damaged, and about 30 trees were downed or damaged.
Nebraska
EF1	NE of Davenport	Thayer, Fillmore	40.33°N 97.78°W	0303	1 mile (1.6 km)	Several structures were damaged or destroyed and several trees were downed.
Sources: SPC Storm Reports for 05/02/12, NWS Hastings, NE, NWS State College, PA

=== May 3 event ===
List of confirmed tornadoes – Thursday, May 9, 2012 (Note: All dates are based on the local time zone where the tornado touched down; however, all times are in Coordinated Universal Time for consistency.)
EF#	Location	County / Parish	State	Start Coord.	Time (UTC)	Path length	Max width	Summary	Refs
EF2	Wayland to Noble to WSW of Crawfordsville	Henry, Washington	IA	41.1355°N 91.67°W	01:40–02:00	6.73 mi (10.83 km)	440 yd (400 m)	Two homes lost their roofs, two turkey farms were destroyed, and a main transmission power pole was snapped by this large, .25 mi (0.40 km) wide tornado. A car was rolled and several outbuildings were destroyed. There was one indirect injury in Henry County.	

=== May 4 event ===
List of reported tornadoes - Friday, May 4, 2012
EF#	Location	County	Coord.	Time (UTC)	Path length	Comments/Damage
Minnesota
EF0	E of Rushmore	Nobles	43.63°N 95.72°W	1903	1 mile (1.6 km)	Brief tornado with no damage.
EF0	WNW of Worthington	Nobles	43.63°N 95.65°W	1910	1.25 miles (2.01 km)	Brief tornado with no damage.
EF0	N of Round Lake	Nobles	43.61°N 95.47°W	1925	0.5 miles (0.80 km)	Brief tornado with no damage.
EF0	SW of Lakefield	Jackson	43.63°N 95.25°W	1940	0.5 miles (0.80 km)	Brief tornado with no damage.
EF0	SSE of Lakefield	Jackson	43.65°N 95.17°W	1949	0.5 miles (0.80 km)	Brief tornado with no damage.
EF0	SE of Lakefield	Jackson	43.63°N 95.11°W	2005	0.5 miles (0.80 km)	Brief tornado with no damage.
EF0	NW of Welcome	Martin	43.70°N 94.73°W	2045	0.1 miles (160 m)	Brief tornado touchdown in open field with no damage.
EF0	Kiester area	Faribault	43.55°N 93.73°W	2245	4 miles (6.4 km)	The tornado downed trees and power poles, damaged three barns, and destroyed a number of sheds and various outbuildings.
Iowa
EF0	S of Sioux Center	Sioux	43.04°N 96.20°W	2015	0.5 miles (0.80 km)	Brief tornado with no damage.
EF0	N of Orange City	Sioux	43.05°N 96.06°W	2022	0.5 miles (0.80 km)	Brief tornado with no damage.
EF0	WNW of Primghar	O'Brien	43.09°N 95.69°W	2050	0.5 miles (0.80 km)	Brief tornado with no damage.
EF1	E of Rake	Winnebago	43.48°N 93.75°W	2252	1 mile (1.6 km)	A barn and an outbuilding were destroyed. Several trees were downed and another outbuilding lost part of its roof.
Sources: SPC Storm Reports for 05/04/12, NWS Twin Cities, MN, NCDC Storm Events Database

=== May 6 event ===
List of reported tornadoes - Sunday, May 6, 2012
EF#	Location	County	Coord.	Time (UTC)	Path length	Comments/Damage
Illinois
EF1	ESE of Watseka	Iroquois	40.77°N 87.67°W	2148	1.5 miles (2.4 km)	Two farmsteads were damaged, and an additional three had tree damage. Various outbuildings were damaged and a utility pole was downed.
EF0	WSW of Hoopeston	Vermilion	40.46°N 87.73°W	2218	2.1 miles (3.4 km)	A grain silo was destroyed, a shed was damaged, and shingles were ripped off of two houses.
Missouri
EF0	SE of Harrelson	Cass	38.77°N 94.49°W	2215	0.2 miles (320 m)	No damage was reported.
EF0	S of Raymore	Cass	38.79°N 94.45°W	2217	50 yards (46 m)	Very brief tornado with no damage.
Kansas
EF0	NE of Olathe	Johnson	38.89°N 94.81°W	2310	50 yards (46 m)	No damage was reported.
EF0	SSW of Olathe	Johnson	38.86°N 94.83°W	2322	50 yards (46 m)	No damage was reported.
Sources: SPC Storm Reports for 05/06/12, NWS Chicago, IL, NCDC Storm Events Database

=== May 8 event ===
List of reported tornadoes - Tuesday, May 8, 2012
EF#	Location	County	Coord.	Time (UTC)	Path length	Comments/Damage
Texas
EF0	NNE of Gardendale	Nueces	27.74°N 97.36°W	1315	50 yards (46 m)	Waterspout moved onshore and quickly dissipated without causing damage.
Florida
EF0	WSW of White City	St. Lucie	27.33°N 80.44°W	2008	50 yards (46 m)	Brief landspout touched down in a produce field with no damage.
Sources: SPC Storm Reports for 05/08/12, NCDC Storm Events Database

=== May 9 event ===
List of confirmed tornadoes – Sunday, Wednesday, May 9, 2012
EF#	Location	County / Parish	State	Start Coord.	Time (UTC)	Path length	Max width	Summary	Refs
EF0	N of Nogales	Santa Cruz	AZ	31.41°N 110.9386°W	19:00–19:02	0.31 mi (0.50 km)	25 yd (23 m)	A landspout tornado formed from a dust devil just south of Rio Rico. No damage occurred.	
EF1	Western Grand Isle	Jefferson	LA	29.2206°N 90.0237°W	19:40–19:45	0.25 mi (0.40 km)	50 yd (46 m)	A waterspout over Barataria Bay moved southward and onshore the west portion of Grand Isle. A manufactured home had its roof torn off, a parked recreational travel trailer suffered significant damage, and roof and siding damage occurred to several other structures. Some roof debris was thrown 30 yards (27 m) to the northeast before the tornado dissipated.	

=== May 10 event ===
List of reported tornadoes - Thursday, May 10, 2012
EF#	Location	County	Coord.	Time (UTC)	Path length	Comments/Damage
Texas
EF0	Woodward area	La Salle	28.53°N 99.29°W	1446	10 miles (16 km)	Tornado flipped an 18-wheeler and an RV. Two people inside the RV sustained serious injuries.
EF0	W of Ricardo	Kleberg	27.42°N 97.91°W	1740	100 yards (91 m)	Brief tornado in open field caused no damage.
EF0	ENE of Kosciusko	Wilson	29.11°N 97.91°W	1825	0.25 miles (400 m)	A barn was destroyed and several other structures sustained minor roof damage. Trees were downed as well.
EF0	W of Suniland	Live Oak	28.59°N 98.27°W	1846	50 yards (46 m)	Brief touchdown with no damage.
EF0	Whitsett area	Live Oak	28.63°N 98.28°W	1904	0.8 miles (1.3 km)	A mobile home and a shed were damaged and several large trees were downed.
EF0	NE of Suniland	Live Oak	28.62°N 98.17°W	1908	0.45 miles (0.72 km)	Brief touchdown with no damage.
EF0	SSW of Nell	Live Oak	28.65°N 98.10°W	1920	100 yards (91 m)	Brief tornado with no damage.
EF0	SW of Pawnee	Bee	28.62°N 98.03°W	2056	0.3 miles (0.48 km)	Brief tornado in open field caused no damage.
EF0	W of Pawnee	Bee	28.65°N 98.02°W	2058	0.35 miles (0.56 km)	Brief tornado in open field caused no damage.
EF0	NW of Pawnee	Bee	28.68°N 98.02°W	2102	1 mile (1.6 km)	Brief tornado in open field caused no damage.
EF0	SW of Three Rivers	Live Oak	28.40°N 98.26°W	2110	100 yards (91 m)	Brief tornado in open field caused no damage.
EF2	Weimar area	Colorado	29.69°N 96.79°W	2224	0.6 miles (0.97 km)	A short-lived but strong tornado caused extensive damage in and around Weimar. The press box at the local high school was destroyed and several boxcars on a nearby railroad were blown off the tracks in different directions.
EF0	S of Clegg	Live Oak	28.08°N 98.33°W	0014	4.9 miles (7.9 km)	Tornado traveled over open fields and caused no damage.
EF0	WSW of Lagarteo	Live Oak	28.09°N 98.03°W	0145	0.4 miles (0.64 km)	Brief touchdown with no damage.
EF0	S of Corpus Christi	Nueces	27.75°N 97.48°W	0320	1.7 miles (2.7 km)	The tornado snapped several utility poles, destroyed a small RV trailer, and damaged a metal structure.
EF1	W of Taft	San Patricio	27.99°N 97.46°W	0332	7.5 miles (12.1 km)	A grain elevator partially collapsed, utility poles were snapped, and many trees were damaged.
EF0	SE of Woodsboro	Refugio	28.14°N 97.29°W	0352	3.7 miles (6.0 km)	Five utility poles were snapped and a shed sustained roof damage.
EF0	NE of Holiday Beach	Aransas	28.20°N 97.00°W	0417	1.1 miles (1.8 km)	A telephone pole was snapped.
EF0	SW of Randado	Jim Hogg	27.08°N 98.88°W	0459	0.1 miles (160 m)	Brief touchdown with no damage.
Sources: SPC Storm Reports for 05/10/12 NWS Corpus Chrisi, TX, NWS Houston/Galveston, TX, NWS Brownsville, TX, NCDC Storm Events Database

=== May 11 event ===
EF#	Location	County / Parish	State	Start Coord.	Time (UTC)	Path length	Summary
EF0	SE of San Benito	Cameron	TX	26.14°N 97.62°W	0815	0.1 miles (0.16 km)	Brief tornado damaged a home and carport, flipped a trailer, and snapped branches of trees.
Sources: SPC Storm Reports for 05/10/12, SPC Storm Reports for 05/11/12, NWS Brownsville, TX

=== May 12 event ===
List of reported tornadoes - Saturday, May 12, 2012
EF#	Location	County	Coord.	Time (UTC)	Path length	Comments/Damage
Florida
EF0	WSW of Pensacola	Escambia	30.35°N 87.41°W	0111	50 yards (46 m)	Waterspout moved onshore and damaged a house, a shed, and a fence.
Sources: SPC Storm Reports for 05/12/12, NCDC Storm Events Database

=== May 13 event ===
List of reported tornadoes - Sunday, May 13, 2012
EF#	Location	County	Coord.	Time (UTC)	Path length	Comments/Damage
Alabama
EF0	WNW of Auburn	Lee	32.65°N 85.68°W	1902	2.3 miles (3.7 km)	Weak tornado downed several trees.
New Mexico
EF1	SW of Magdalena	Socorro	34.09°N 107.27°W	1949	1.2 miles (1.9 km)	Two dust devils merged to form a brief landspout in open desert. Two stock tanks were tossed and some native juniper trees and a few cacti were downed.
Sources: SPC Storm Reports for 05/13/12

=== May 14 event ===
List of reported tornadoes - Monday, May 14, 2012
EF#	Location	County	Coord.	Time (UTC)	Path length	Comments/Damage
North Carolina
EF1	SW of Rockingham	Richmond	34.82°N 79.83°W	1655	2 miles (3.2 km)	Many trees were downed and a shed was destroyed. Several homes suffered roof and siding damage.
South Carolina
EF0	Bolen area	Orangeburg	33.48°N 81.06°W	2150	3.2 miles (5.1 km)	Tornado downed several trees along an intermittent path.
Sources: SPC Storm Reports for 05/14/12, NWS Raleigh, NC, NCDC Storm Events Database

=== May 18 event ===
List of reported tornadoes - Friday, May 18, 2012
EF#	Location	County	Coord.	Time (UTC)	Path length	Comments/Damage
Wyoming
EF0	SSE of Wendover	Platte	42.25°N 104.85°W	2009	1 mile (1.6 km)	Weak tornado remained over open country and caused no damage.
Sources: SPC Storm Reports for 05/18/12, NCDC Storm Events Database

=== May 19 event ===
List of reported tornadoes - Saturday, May 19, 2012
EF#	Location	County	Coord.	Time (UTC)	Path length	Comments/Damage
Kansas
EF1	WNW of Spivey	Kingman	37.48°N 98.37°W	2238	5.7 miles (9.2 km)	Several outbuildings and one home suffered minor damage. Road machinery was also damaged.
EF0	NW of Kingman	Kingman	37.68°N 98.23°W	2240	6.75 miles (10.86 km)	A few trees were downed.
EF0	NW of Spivey	Kingman	37.47°N 98.31°W	2245	5.9 miles (9.5 km)	No damage was reported.
EF0	W of Kingman	Kingman	37.64°N 98.17°W	2249	0.6 miles (0.97 km)	Brief touchdown with no damage.
EF0	S of Kingman	Kingman	37.57°N 98.15°W	2257	2 miles (3.2 km)	Brief tornado with no damage.
EF0	WSW of Spivey	Kingman	37.43°N 98.24°W	2302	1.4 miles (2.3 km)	Brief rope tornado with no damage.
EF0	SW of Spivey to WNW of Rago	Kingman	37.43°N 98.19°W	2312	5.6 miles (9.0 km)	Tornado moved over open country and caused no damage.
EF3	W of Duquoin to SSE of Rago	Harper, Kingman	37.36°N 98.23°W	2316	9.7 miles (15.6 km)	Six wind turbines were badly damaged or destroyed, and a crane was toppled to the ground. A few power lines and trees were downed, and oil tanks were destroyed. The crane recorded a 166 MPH wind gust before collapsing.
EF3	NW of Harper	Harper	37.27°N 98.22°W	2333	9.7 miles (15.6 km)	A manufactured home and a frame home had their roofs torn off, and outbuildings were destroyed with debris strewn in all directions. Vehicles and pieces of machinery were thrown and mangled. Hardwood trees were completely defoliated, denuded, and partially debarked.
Florida
EF0	St. Petersburg	Pinellas	27.76°N 82.67°W	0120	unknown	Brief tornado removed part of the roof from a motel.
Sources: SPC Storm Reports for 05/19/12, NWS Wichita, NCDC Storm Events Database

=== May 21 event ===
List of reported tornadoes - Monday, May 21, 2012
EF#	Location	County	Coord.	Time (UTC)	Path length	Comments/Damage
Texas
EF0	NW of Adrian	Oldham	35.33°N 102.73°W	0137	0.6 miles (970 m)	Brief tornado with no damage.
Sources: SPC Storm Reports for 05/21/12, NWS Amarillo

=== May 22 event ===
List of reported tornadoes - Tuesday, May 22, 2012
EF#	Location	County	Coord.	Time (UTC)	Path length	Comments/Damage
North Dakota
EF0	NW of Ambrose	Divide	48.98°N 103.59°W	2207	5.3 miles (8.5 km)	Touchdown in open country along the Canada–US border resulted in no damage.
EF0	ENE of Blaisdell	Mountrail	48.34°N 102.03°W	2321	0.8 miles (1.3 km)	Storm spotters reported a tornado touchdown with no damage.
Sources: SPC Storm Reports for 05/22/12, NCDC Storm Reports Database

=== May 23 event ===
List of reported tornadoes - Wednesday, May 23, 2012
EF#	Location	County	Coord.	Time (UTC)	Path length	Comments/Damage
Louisiana
EF0	NW of Chalmette	St. Bernard	29.96°N 89.99°W	2007	0.25 miles (400 m)	Ten homes suffered minor roof and siding damage and a carport was destroyed.
Sources: SPC Storm Reports for 05/23/12

=== May 24 event ===
List of reported tornadoes - Thursday, May 24, 2012
EF#	Location	County	Coord.	Time (UTC)	Path length	Comments/Damage
Iowa
EF1	N of Hawkeye	Fayette	42.97°N 91.96°W	2156	3 miles (4.8 km)	Several structures were damaged, including homes, barns, and outbuildings.
Nebraska
EF2	WNW of Cornlea	Platte	44.69°N 97.60°W	2236	0.75 miles (1.21 km)	One home had its roof removed and most of its walls collapsed.
Florida
EF0	North Port	Sarasota	27.03°N 82.23°W	2240	0.4 miles (640 m)	17 homes suffered mostly minor damage. Although, one home lost nearly two-thirds of its roof.
Wisconsin
EF0	E of Marathon City	Marathon	44.91°N 89.68°W	0007	5 miles (8.0 km)	Tornado skipped northeast while downing trees.
Sources: SPC Storm Reports for 05/24/12, NWS Green Bay, WI, NWS Tampa, FL, NWS Omaha, NCDC Storm Events Database

=== May 25 event ===
List of reported tornadoes - Friday, May 25, 2012
EF#	Location	County	Coord.	Time (UTC)	Path length	Comments/Damage
Kansas
EF0	S of Gorham (1st tornado)	Russell	38.82°N 99.02°W	2348	1.4 miles (2.3 km)	Brief tornado remained over open fields and caused no damage.
EF0	S of Gorham (2nd tornado)	Russell	38.79°N 99.02°W	0135	0.6 miles (0.97 km)	Brief tornado remained over open fields and caused no damage.
EF0	NW of Milberger to SW of Russell	Russell	38.78°N 99.02°W	0144	5.8 miles (9.3 km)	Brief tornado remained over open fields and caused no damage.
EF0	NW of Hargrave	Rush	38.56°N 99.45°W	0208	0.6 miles (0.97 km)	Brief tornado damaged a shed and blew down a sign.
EF0	W of Hargrave	Rush	38.55°N 99.46°W	0215	2.7 miles (4.3 km)	Trees and an outbuilding were damaged.
EF1	SE of Hargrave	Rush	38.54°N 99.42°W	0222	1.9 miles (3.1 km)	Trees and several outbuildings were damaged.
EF2	SE of Hargrave to SSE of Liebenthal	Rush	38.53°N 99.32°W	0230	9.2 miles (14.8 km)	A strong, large tornado passed near La Crosse and caused significant damage to farmsteads, trees, outbuildings, and irrigation pivots.
EF2	S of Russell	Russell	38.86°N 98.85°W	0240	0.25 miles (400 m)	This brief but strong tornado impacted a subdivision just south of Russell, where four manufactured homes were damaged. One of these homes was completely destroyed, and another was flipped over. A pole barn was also destroyed, and one person sustained minor injuries.
EF1	La Crosse	Rush	38.53°N 99.32°W	0240	1.9 miles (3.1 km)	Satellite tornado to the 0230 EF2 struck the town of La Crosse directly. This tornado damaged several trees, buildings, and destroyed three RV campers in town.
EF2	N of La Crosse	Rush	38.55°N 99.31°W	0245	1 mile (1.6 km)	Another satellite tornado to the 0230 EF2 caused major tree damage.
EF2	NNW of Bison to SE of Liebenthal	Rush	38.56°N 99.24°W	0258	5.8 miles (9.3 km)	Trees and power lines were downed, and there was significant ground and vegetation scouring along the path as well.
EF1	SE of Loretto	Rush	38.61°N 99.17°W	0311	1.3 miles (2.1 km)	Several trees were downed along the path.
EF1	NE of Loretto	Rush, Ellis	38.67°N 99.14°W	0335	2.8 miles (4.5 km)	Several trees and power lines were downed.
Sources: SPC Storm Reports for 05/25/12, NWS Dodge City, NWS Wichita, NCDC Storm Events Database

=== May 27 event ===
List of reported tornadoes - Sunday, May 27, 2012
EF#	Location	County	Coord.	Time (UTC)	Path length	Comments/Damage
Nebraska
EF0	NW of Closter	Boone	41.90°N 97.97°W	2206	1.4 miles (2.3 km)	Brief tornado with no damage.
EF0	SSE of Greeley	Greeley	41.47°N 98.47°W	2223	100 yards (91 m)	Brief tornado with no damage.
EF0	SE of Closter	Boone	41.82°N 97.87°W	2305	1.7 miles (2.7 km)	Brief tornado with no damage.
EF0	W of Madison	Madison	41.83°N 97.63°W	2330	1.75 miles (2.82 km)	Brief tornado was caught on video but resulted in no damage.
Wisconsin
EF0	NE of Luck	Polk	45.59°N 92.46°W	0113	0.2 miles (320 m)	Brief tornado touched down in a marsh and was caught on video. No damage was reported.
Sources: SPC Storm Reports for 05/27/12, NCDC Storm Events Database

=== May 28 event ===
- The event in Florida was related to Tropical Storm Beryl.

List of reported tornadoes - Monday, May 28, 2012
EF#	Location	County	Coord.	Time (UTC)	Path length	Comments/Damage
Florida
EF0	E of Port St. Lucie	St. Lucie	27.28°N 80.31°W	1858	0.6 miles (0.97 km)	Brief tornado damaged the roofs of two homes. Trees, power lines, and small fences were downed.
Sources: SPC Storm Reports for 05/28/12, NCDC Storm Events Database

=== May 29 event ===
- The events in Florida and South Carolina were related to Tropical Storm Beryl.

List of reported tornadoes - Tuesday, May 29, 2012
EF#	Location	County	Coord.	Time (UTC)	Path length	Comments/Damage
Florida
EF0	NW of Yankeetown	Levy	29.03°N 82.76°W	1813	2.8 miles (4.5 km)	A waterspout moved onshore and caused minor damage to numerous trees and structures.
Vermont
EF0	West Glover area	Orleans	44.69°N 72.26°W	1925	0.3 miles (0.48 km)	One home was damaged and about 45 trees were downed.
Oklahoma
EF1	WSW of Piedmont	Canadian	35.62°N 97.80°W	0126	1 mile (1.6 km)	The roof of a mobile home was damaged.
EF0	W of Union City	Canadian	35.38°N 97.99°W	0215	1 mile (1.6 km)	Some minor damage was reported though not specified as to what was damaged.
South Carolina
EF1	ESE of Holly Hill	Orangeburg	33.31°N 80.36°W	0203	1.5 miles (2.4 km)	Tornado took the top off of several trees and uprooted others before entering a corn field where the tornado left flattened swirls of corn before dissipating.
Sources: SPC Storm Reports for 05/29/12, NCDC Storm Events Database

=== May 30 event ===
- The event in North Carolina was related to Tropical Storm Beryl.

List of reported tornadoes - Wednesday, May 30, 2012
EF#	Location	County	Coord.	Time (UTC)	Path length	Comments/Damage
North Carolina
EF1	SW of Peletier	Carteret	34.73°N 77.10°W	1434	0.5 miles (0.80 km)	High-end EF1 tornado destroyed 3 homes and damaged 67 others. A garage and several outbuildings were also destroyed. Between 75 and 100 pine trees were snapped in half and many others were uprooted as well.
Kansas
EF0	NE of Edson	Sherman	39.43°N 101.41°W	2100	0.25 miles (0.40 km)	Small landspout with no damage.
Texas
EF0	WSW of Crowell	Foard	33.87°N 99.95°W	2227	2 miles (3.2 km)	Large rain-wrapped tornado with no damage.
EF0	E of Paducah (1st tornado)	Cottle	34.01°N 100.28°W	2255	0.7 miles (1.1 km)	A brief non-mesocyclonic tornado lifted dirt into the air but caused no damage.
EF0	E of Paducah (2nd tornado)	Cottle	34.00°N 100.28°W	2259	0.4 miles (0.64 km)	A brief non-mesocyclonic tornado lifted dirt into the air but caused no damage.
EF0	E of Paducah (3rd tornado)	Cottle	34.01°N 100.28°W	2300	0.3 miles (0.48 km)	A brief non-mesocyclonic tornado lifted dirt into the air but caused no damage.
EF0	S of Paducah	Cottle	33.96°N 100.30°W	2317	0.6 miles (0.97 km)	A brief non-mesocyclonic tornado caused no damage.
EF0	NE of Paint Rock	Runnels	31.58°N 99.86°W	2338	0.1 miles (160 m)	Tornado briefly touched down in an open area and lifted dirt into the air. This tornado was caught on video.
EF0	ENE of Paint Rock	Concho	31.54°N 99.84°W	2347	0.1 miles (160 m)	No damage was reported with this brief tornado.
EF0	Narcisso area	Cottle	34.04°N 100.45°W	0014	4.8 miles (7.7 km)	Partially rain-wrapped cone tornado crossed U.S. Highway 70, but otherwise remained over open land and caused no damage.
EF0	SE of Millersview	Concho	31.41°N 99.75°W	0020	0.15 miles (240 m)	Brief touchdown with no damage.
Sources: SPC Storm Reports for 05/30/12, NCDC Storm Reports Database

== June ==
Confirmed tornadoes by Enhanced Fujita rating
EFU	EF0	EF1	EF2	EF3	EF4	EF5	Total
0	84	22	6	0	0	0	112

=== June 1 event ===
List of reported tornadoes - Friday, June 1, 2012
EF#	Location	County	Coord.	Time (UTC)	Path length	Comments/Damage
Maryland
EF0	WSW of Damascus	Montgomery	39.27°N 77.23°W	1829	1 mile (1.6 km)	A barn had part of its roof peeled off and several trees were downed.
EF0	SW of Poolesville	Montgomery	39.08°N 77.45°W	1837	0.5 miles (0.80 km)	Brief tornado caught on video downed a dozen trees and a street sign.
EF0	SE of Mount Airy	Carroll	39.36°N 77.14°W	1848	0.4 miles (0.64 km)	Brief tornado caused sporadic tree damage.
EF1	SW of Watersville	Howard	39.36°N 77.12°W	1852	1.4 miles (2.3 km)	Numerous trees were snapped or uprooted, including 30–40 hardwood trees with a diameter up to 2 ft (0.61 m).
EF0	SSE of Damascus	Montgomery	39.25°N 77.19°W	1909	1 mile (1.6 km)	Several homes and many sustained minor damage.
EF1	NNW of Gamber	Carroll	39.50°N 76.95°W	1921	4 miles (6.4 km)	Damage confined to uprooted trees and snapped limbs.
EF0	ENE of Scaggsville	Howard	39.15°N 76.88°W	2029	1.6 miles (2.6 km)	Trees were snapped or uprooted and three homes suffered minor damage.
EF0	NW of Springdale	Prince George's	38.94°N 76.85°W	2127	0.9 miles (1.4 km)	Brief tornado uprooted trees and snapped limbs.
EF0	NE of Bowie	Anne Arundel	39.047°N 76.755°W	2142	0.2 miles (320 m)	Several trees were snapped or uprooted in the Patuxent Wildlife Research Refuge.
EF1	Pleasant Hills area	Harford	39.48°N 76.39°W	2154	1.25 miles (2.01 km)	Numerous buildings suffered roof, siding, and window damage. A pickup truck was overturned and street signs, power lines, and trees were downed. Two people were injured.
EF1	WSW of Bellegrove	Allegany	39.69°N 78.38°W	2230	1.1 miles (1.8 km)	Many trees were snapped or uprooted.
EF0	NNE of Fort Meade	Anne Arundel	39.10°N 76.74°W	2306	6.4 miles (10.3 km)	Tornado caused damage to trees and an apartment complex.
EF0	NE of Centreville	Queen Anne's	39.05°N 76.00°W	0030	5 miles (8.0 km)	Numerous trees were snapped and some large trees were uprooted. Several homes sustained minor to moderate damage as well.
Pennsylvania
EF0	S of Red Lion	York	39.87°N 76.61°W	2030	75 yards (69 m)	A roof was blown off of a house and a tree was downed with this brief tornado.
EF1	NE of Ligonier	Westmoreland	40.24°N 79.24°W	2125	8 miles (13 km)	A house lost its roof and 14 cabins sustained minor damage. Many trees were downed as well.
EF0	NNE of Seward	Indiana	40.47°N 78.99°W	2145	unknown	Numerous trees were snapped. This tornado came from the same storm that produced the Ligioner tornado.
EF0	Pleasantville	Bedford	40.19°N 78.58°W	2218	1.5 miles (2.4 km)	A brief tornado occurred within a larger area of straight-line winds near Allum Bank. Four structures were damaged and thirty trees were knocked down.
Florida
EF0	NE of Okeechobee	Okeechobee	27.29°N 80.79°W	2113	0.9 miles (1.4 km)	Brief tornado scattered debris and downed vegetation.
South Dakota
EF0	N of Columbia	Brown	45.65°N 98.32°W	2227	0.5 miles (0.80 km)	Brief touchdown with no damage.
EF0	SE of Raymond	Clark	44.91°N 97.88°W	0059	2.4 miles (3.9 km)	No damage was reported.
EF0	N of Willow Lake	Clark	44.70°N 97.64°W	0148	0.5 miles (0.80 km)	Brief touchdown with no damage.
EF0	S of Willow Lake	Clark	44.58°N 97.64°W	0214	0.6 miles (0.97 km)	Brief touchdown with no damage.
Virginia
EF0	Petersburg	City of Petersburg	37.17°N 77.38°W	2302	3 miles (4.8 km)	A few homes suffered minor roof and window damage. Several trees and power lines were downed. 5 minor injuries occurred.
EF1	Hampton	City of Hampton	37.00°N 76.35°W	0013	3.5 miles (5.6 km)	Tornado began as a waterspout and moved on shore. Hundreds of homes, a yacht club, and a sea food building suffered roof and window damage. Several boats were also damaged. It then turned into a waterspout once again before dissipating.
EF0	N of Cape Charles	Northampton	37.31°N 76.01°W	0108	0.75 miles (1.21 km)	Tornado touched down in Savage Neck Dunes Natural Area Preserve and tossed several kayaks and downed a few trees.
Sources: SPC Storm Reports for 06/01/12, NWS Wakefield, VA, NWS Sterling, VA, NWS Pittsburgh, NCDC Storm Events Database

=== June 2 event ===
List of reported tornadoes - Saturday, June 2, 2012
EF#	Location	County	Coord.	Time (UTC)	Path length	Comments/Damage
Colorado
EF0	SW of Eads	Kiowa	38.44°N 102.81°W	2308	1.25 miles (2.01 km)	No damage was reported with this tornado.
EF0	SE of Eads	Kiowa	38.44°N 102.81°W	2311	1.1 miles (1.8 km)	No damage was reported.
EF0	SW of Firstview	Cheyenne	38.78°N 102.58°W	2316	1.5 miles (2.4 km)	Landspout tornado in open fields with no damage.
EF0	SE of Peconic	Kit Carson	39.28°N 102.11°W	0006	1.5 miles (2.4 km)	Tornado picked up dirt but no damage.
Sources: SPC Storm Reports for 06/02/12, NWS Pueblo, CO, NCDC Storm Events Database

=== June 3 event ===
List of reported tornadoes - Sunday, June 3, 2012
EF#	Location	County	Coord.	Time (UTC)	Path length	Comments/Damage
North Dakota
EF0	SSW of Drayton	Walsh, Marshall (MN)	48.54°N 97.20°W	2307	6 miles (9.7 km)	Intermittent tornado snapped tree branches along its path.
EF0	ENE of Warsaw	Walsh	48.31°N 97.19°W	0002	3 miles (4.8 km)	Intermittent tornado snapped tree branches along its path.
EF0	NNW of Valley City	Barnes	46.95°N 98.02°W	0016	0.25 miles (0.40 km)	Landspout over open fields.
Minnesota
EF1	WNW of Alvarado	Marshall	48.22°N 97.10°W	0020	3 miles (4.8 km)	Shingles were torn from farm buildings and trees were damaged.
Sources: SPC Storm Reports for 06/03/12, NWS Grand Forks, ND

=== June 4 event ===
List of reported tornadoes - Monday, June 4, 2012
EF#	Location	County	Coord.	Time (UTC)	Path length	Comments/Damage
Arkansas
EF0	SSW of Carlisle	Lonoke	34.96°N 91.79°W	2045	0.1 miles (160 m)	Landspout tornado over open farmland produced no damage.
Texas
EF0	SW of Crosbyton	Crosby	33.63°N 101.27°W	0128	50 yards (46 m)	Brief tornado with no damage.
Missouri
EF2	Diehlstadt	Scott	36.96°N 89.43°W	0144	0.5 miles (0.80 km)	3 deaths - A mobile home was completely destroyed and several warehouse buildings were damaged. Tree, power lines, signs, and fencing were blown down. Tornado was embedded in a larger microburst.
Sources: SPC Storm Reports for 06/04/12, NWS Little Rock, AR, NWS Paducah, KY, NCDC Storm Events Database

=== June 5 event ===
List of reported tornadoes - Tuesday, June 5, 2012
EF#	Location	County	Coord.	Time (UTC)	Path length	Comments/Damage
Montana
EF1	White Sulphur Springs area	Meagher	46.54°N 110.86°W	2140	2 miles (3.2 km)	The city's water tank was partially buried in the ground. Another building was almost completely destroyed. Roofs were damaged in a subdivision, and many trees were heavily damaged.
EF0	NNE of Moccasin	Judith Basin	47.10°N 109.89°W	0012	3 miles (4.8 km)	No damage was reported with the tornado itself, but strong downburst winds associated with the parent thunderstorm damaged trees and homes and destroyed one building.
EF0	SE of Big Sandy	Chouteau	48.04°N 109.82°W	0129	1 mile (1.6 km)	Brief touchdown with only tree damage.
Sources: SPC Storm Reports for 06/05/12, NWS Great Falls, MT

=== June 6 event ===
List of reported tornadoes - Wednesday, June 6, 2012
EF#	Location	County	Coord.	Time (UTC)	Path Length	Comments/Damage
Colorado
EF0	N of Denver International Airport	Denver	39.87°N 104.67°W	2305	0.1 miles (160 m)	Brief landspout with no damage.
EF0	W of Grover	Weld	40.87°N 104.23°W	2305	0.1 miles (160 m)	Brief tornado uprooted a small tree and threw it 20 feet (6.1 m).
EF0	SSW of Elizabeth	Elbert	39.29°N 104.63°W	0130	0.1 miles (160 m)	Brief tornado with no damage.
EF0	ENE of Franktown	Douglas	39.41°N 104.67°W	0140	0.1 miles (160 m)	Brief tornado with no damage.
EF0	N of Elizabeth (1st tornado)	Elbert	39.47°N 104.62°W	0144	0.1 miles (160 m)	Brief tornado with no damage.
EF0	SE of Aurora	Arapahoe	39.61°N 104.61°W	0145	0.1 miles (160 m)	Brief tornado with no damage.
EF0	N of Elizabeth (2nd tornado)	Elbert	39.51°N 104.60°W	0251	0.1 miles (160 m)	Brief tornado with no damage.
Sources: SPC Storm Reports for 06/06/12, NCDC Storm Events Database

=== June 7 event ===
List of reported tornadoes - Thursday, June 7, 2012
EF#	Location	County	Coord.	Time (UTC)	Path Length	Comments/Damage
South Dakota
EF1	ESE of Argyle	Custer	43.51°N 103.59°W	2055	0.1 miles (160 m)	Trees were snapped and uprooted.
Wyoming
EF2	W of Wheatland to NE of Chugwater	Platte	42.05°N 104.96°W	2107	20.6 miles (33.2 km)	Several homes, mobile homes, and outbuildings were badly damaged, some destroyed. Many trees were downed and six empty railcars were derailed. One person was injured as the tornado remained on the ground for over an hour.
EF0	SSE of Little Bear	Laramie	41.44°N 104.87°W	2233	0.1 miles (160 m)	Brief tornado with no damage.
EF0	ESE of Little Bear	Laramie	41.46°N 104.74°W	0028	0.25 miles (400 m)	Brief tornado in open country with no damage.
Colorado
EF0	WSW of Peoria	Arapahoe	39.66°N 104.16°W	2321	0.1 miles (160 m)	Brief touchdown over an open field resulted in no damage.
EF0	W of Cedar Point	Elbert	39.35°N 104.11°W	0018	0.1 miles (160 m)	Brief touchdown resulted in no damage.
EF2	Fondis to ENE of Calhan	Elbert, El Paso	39.05°N 104.26°W	0046	8 miles (13 km)	Four barns and a house were destroyed, another house lost part of its roof, and a hay wagon was moved about 70 feet (21 m). A shed was also destroyed and a pickup truck was thrown into a motor home.
EF0	SSW of Ramah	El Paso	39.07°N 104.19°W	0138	0.25 miles (400 m)	Anticylonic tornado briefly touched down over an open field.
EF0	WNW of Dover	Weld	40.78°N 104.87°W	0245	0.1 miles (160 m)	Brief tornado with no damage.
Sources: SPC Storm Reports for 06/07/12, NWS Pueblo, CO, NWS Boulder, CO, NWS Cheyanne, WY, NCDC Storm Events Database

=== June 8 event ===
List of reported tornadoes - Friday, June 8, 2012
EF#	Location	County	Coord.	Time (UTC)	Path Length	Comments/Damage
Michigan
EF1	SW of Big Bay	Marquette	46.73°N 87.85°W	0030	7.8 miles (12.6 km)	Numerous trees were uprooted or snapped. An older structure was severely damaged when a tree fell on it.
Sources: SPC Storm Reports for 06/08/12, NWS Marquette, MI

=== June 10 event ===
List of reported tornadoes - Sunday, June 10, 2012
EF#	Location	County	Coord.	Time (UTC)	Path Length	Comments/Damage
Alabama
EF1	NNE of Geneva	Geneva, Coffee	31.07°N 85.89°W	1611	9.6 miles (15.4 km)	Trees were downed and numerous structures were damaged.
Minnesota
EF0	SSW of Belle Plaine	Le Sueur, Scott	44.55°N 93.80°W	0115	2 miles (3.2 km)	A shed was destroyed, with another losing its roof. A grain bin was blown into a field and numerous trees were downed.
South Carolina
EF0	N of Newberry	Newberry	34.32°N 81.63°W	0148	1.5 miles (2.4 km)	Several trees were downed.
Sources: SPC Storm Reports for 06/10/12, NWS Tallahassee, FL, NCDC Storm Events Database

=== June 11 event ===
List of reported tornadoes - Monday, June 11, 2012
EF#	Location	County	Coord.	Time (UTC)	Path Length	Comments/Damage
South Carolina
EF0	ESE of Cameron	Calhoun	33.53°N 80.68°W	1742	1.25 miles (2.01 km)	Weak tornado downed several trees and powerlines.
EF1	S of Ridgeland	Jasper	32.3809°N 80.9795°W	2121	4.12 miles (6.63 km)	Many trees were downed with minor debarking occurring.
Sources: SPC Storm Reports for 06/11/12, NWS Charleston, SC, NCDC Storm Events Database

=== June 12 event ===
List of reported tornadoes - Tuesday, June 12, 2012
EF#	Location	County	Coord.	Time (UTC)	Path Length	Comments/Damage
Texas
EF1	Frankel City area	Andrews	32.39°N 102.81°W	0158	0.13 miles (210 m)	Brief tornado bent two power poles and snapped another.
New Mexico
EF1	NE of Floyd	Roosevelt	34.241°N 103.530°W	0307	1.1 miles (1.8 km)	The extent of the damage is unknown.
EF0	NE of Dora	Roosevelt	33.960°N 103.336°W	0407	1.7 miles (2.7 km)	The extent of the damage is unknown.
Sources: SPC Storm Reports for 06/12/12, NCDC Storm Events Database

=== June 13 event ===
List of reported tornadoes - Wednesday, June 13, 2012
EF#	Location	County	Coord.	Time (UTC)	Path Length	Comments/Damage
Texas
EF0	N of Randolph	Fannin	33.48°N 96.25°W	0108	0.15 miles (240 m)	Minor damage occurred to homes, barns, and crops. Several trees were downed.
Sources: SPC Storm Reports for 06/13/12

=== June 14 event ===
List of reported tornadoes - Thursday, June 14, 2012
EF#	Location	County	Coord.	Time (UTC)	Path Length	Comments/Damage
Colorado
EF0	SSW of Springfield	Baca	37.30°N 102.67°W	2037	0.3 miles (480 m)	Brief landspout with no damage in Pike-San Isabel National Forest.
EF0	SSW of Holly (1st tornado)	Prowers	37.77°N 102.22°W	2158	0.3 miles (480 m)	Slow-moving landspout moved through a wheat field and almost hit a combine.
EF0	SSW of Holly (2nd tornado)	Prowers	37.77°N 102.22°W	unknown	unknown	Slow-moving landspout with no damage. Occurred simultaneously with the 2158 UTC tornado.
EF0	SSW of Holly (3rd tornado)	Prowers	37.77°N 102.22°W	unknown	unknown	Slow-moving landspout with no damage. Occurred simultaneously with the 2158 UTC tornado.
Kansas
EF0	SSW of Beeler	Ness	38.37°N 100.23°W	0018	0.5 miles (0.80 km)	Brief rain-wrapped tornado with no damage.
Sources: SPC Storm Reports for 06/14/12, NCDC Storm Events Database

=== June 15 event ===
List of reported tornadoes - Friday, June 15, 2012
EF#	Location	County	Coord.	Time (UTC)	Path Length	Comments/Damage
Colorado
EF0	NNE of Bennett	Adams	39.77°N 104.42°W	2056	0.1 miles (160 m)	Brief tornado with no damage.
Sources: SPC Storm Reports for 06/15/12, NCDC Storm Events Database

=== June 16 event ===
List of reported tornadoes - Saturday, June 16, 2012
EF#	Location	County	Coord.	Time (UTC)	Path Length	Comments/Damage
Colorado
EF0	N of Pritchett	Baca	37.44°N 102.86°W	0002	1.05 miles (1.69 km)	Brief tornado with no damage.
Sources: SPC Storm Reports for 06/16/12, NCDC Storm Events Database

=== June 17 event ===
List of reported tornadoes - Sunday, June 17, 2012
EF#	Location	County	Coord.	Time (UTC)	Path Length	Comments/Damage
Minnesota
EF0	SW of Charlesville	Traverse	45.92°N 96.34°W	2352	100 yards (91 m)	Brief touchdown with no damage.
EF0	N of Norcross	Grant	45.89°N 96.23°W	0002	2.9 miles (4.7 km)	A few trees and tree limbs were downed.
EF0	NNE of Gluek	Chippewa	45.13°N 95.38°W	0059	0.15 miles (240 m)	Brief tornado touched down in a corn field and damaged some corn.
EF0	SSE of Hagan	Chippewa	45.08°N 95.75°W	0143	0.3 miles (480 m)	A shed and a playhouse were blown into a corn field and about two dozen trees were snapped or uprooted.
South Dakota
EF0	S of Peever	Roberts	45.46°N 96.96°W	0000	50 yards (46 m)	Brief touchdown with no damage.
EF1	NW of Big Stone City	Roberts	45.40°N 96.62°W	0053	0.3 miles (480 m)	Several trees were downed and two mobile homes and a shed suffered structural damage. Several cabins sustained major structural and roof damage as well.
Sources: SPC Storm Reports for 06/17/12, NWS Aberdeen, SD, NCDC Storm Events Database

=== June 18 event ===
List of reported tornadoes - Monday, June 18, 2012
EF#	Location	County	Coord.	Time (UTC)	Path Length	Comments/Damage
Michigan
EF1	NNE of Roscommon	Crawford	44.59°N 84.54°W	0128	1.3 miles (2.1 km)	Numerous trees were downed at a golf course.
Sources: SPC Storm Reports for 06/18/12, NWS Gaylord, MI

=== June 20 event ===
List of reported tornadoes - Wednesday, June 20, 2012
EF#	Location	County	Coord.	Time (UTC)	Path Length	Comments/Damage
North Dakota
EF0	E of Kempton	Grand Forks	47.82°N 97.53°W	2349	1 mile (1.6 km)	A few trees and tree branches were downed with this long, thin rope tornado,
EF1	ENE of Northwood	Grand Forks	47.77°N 97.43°W	0002	2 miles (3.2 km)	Several trees were snapped or uprooted.
Sources: SPC Storm Reports for 06/20/12, NWS Grand Forks, ND

=== June 22 event ===
List of reported tornadoes - Friday, June 22, 2012
EF#	Location	County	Coord.	Time (UTC)	Path Length	Comments/Damage
Nebraska
EF0	SW of Sidney	Cheyenne	41.06°N 103.10°W	2321	0.3 miles (0.48 km)	Brief landspout along a gust front resulted in no damage.
South Dakota
EF2	N of Ardmore	Fall River	43.08°N 103.66°W	0218	8 miles (13 km)	A barn and several sheds were completely destroyed on a ranch.
Sources: SPC Storm Reports for 06/20/12, NWS Rapid City, SD, NCDC Storm Events Database

=== June 23 event ===
List of confirmed tornadoes - Saturday, June 23, 2012
EF#	Location	County / Parish	State	Start Coord.	Time (UTC)	Path length	Maximum width
EF0	ESE of East Naples	Collier	FL	26.11°N 81.747°W	19:35–19:37	1.7 mi (2.7 km)	20 yd (18 m)
EF0	A waterspout was observed moving inland from the Isles of Capri. Damage occurred along an intermittent path with small trees uprooted, a palm tree snapped, heavy damage to a lanai, and snapped tree branches, one of which struck a car.						
EF0	ENE of Naples Park	Collier	FL	26.274°N 81.789°W	20:00	0.05 mi (0.080 km)	10 yd (9.1 m)
EF0	An extremely brief tornado snapped tree branches at the North Collier Hospital, one of which struck and injured a person.						

=== June 24 event ===
List of confirmed tornadoes - Sunday, June 24, 2012
EF#	Location	County / Parish	State	Start Coord.	Time (UTC)	Path length	Maximum width
EF0	S of Zolfo Springs to WSW of Bowling Green	Hardee	FL	27.4°N 81.78°W	14:15–14:30	17.03 mi (27.41 km)	100 yd (91 m)
EF0	A long-tracked tornado moved through predominantly rural areas, causing damage to orange groves, a barn, and a tractor.						
EF0	Muse	Glades	FL	26.84°N 81.52°W	15:00	0.01 mi (0.016 km)	10 yd (9.1 m)
EF0	A brief tornado damaged the roof of a barn.						
EF0	S of Goodland to N of Royal Palm	Collier	FL	25.762°N 81.641°W	15:10–15:40	16.2 mi (26.1 km)	30 yd (27 m)
EF0	A waterspout originated over Gullivan Bay and moved across the Ten Thousand Islands National Wildlife Refuge. Damage was confined to trees in unpopulated areas.						
EF0	E of Golden Gate	Collier	FL	26.162°N 81.542°W	16:00	0.01 mi (0.016 km)	20 yd (18 m)
EF0	A trained spotter observed a tornado near Alligator Alley.						
EF2	Venus	Highlands	FL	27.04°N 81.36°W	16:23–16:29	3.45 mi (5.55 km)	150 yd (140 m)
EF2	1 death – A woman was killed after being thrown 200 ft (61 m) by the tornado; her daughter was found in her arms with injuries. The tornado damaged or destroyed six homes, tossed boats in a lake, and downed numerous trees. The original public information statement from the NWS Forecast Office in Tampa Bay lists this as an EF2 tornado; however, the NCEI database lists this as an EF0 tornado.						
EF0	SW of Immokalee	Collier	FL	26.37°N 81.55°W	16:25–16:30	0.1 mi (0.16 km)	20 yd (18 m)
EF0	A trained spotter observed a tornado over open fields.						
EF0	NW of Lake Worth	Palm Beach	FL	26.634°N 80.0645°W	16:25	0.1 mi (0.16 km)	20 yd (18 m)
EF0	A brief tornado damaged trees and pulled debris from a park.						
EF0	West Palm Beach	Palm Beach	FL	26.697°N 80.068°W	17:25–17:27	1.2 mi (1.9 km)	30 yd (27 m)
EF0	An intermittent tornado touched down in a warehouse district in West Palm Beach, damaging the roof and doors of one warehouse. It struck the West Palm Beach station, damaging trees, knocking down a gate, and snapping a rail crossing arm.						
EF0	Golden Beach	Miami-Dade	FL	25.966°N 80.118°W	18:05–18:06	0.5 mi (0.80 km)	30 yd (27 m)
EF0	A waterspout briefly moved onshore, tossing beach chairs and damaging trees and a beach hut. One structure had its doors and a gate blown in.						
EF0	WSW of Palmdale	Glades	FL	26.92°N 81.34°W	19:04	0.01 mi (0.016 km)	20 yd (18 m)
EF0	A police officer reported a tornado crossing SR 74.						
EF1	WNW of Placid Lakes	Highlands	FL	27.27°N 81.44°W	19:23–19:30	5.31 mi (8.55 km)	100 yd (91 m)
EF1	This tornado remained over uninhabited areas for much of its track before crossing Lake June in Winter. Along the lake's north shore, nine homes were damaged. A two-story home had the majority of its top floor destroyed, with only an interior bathroom remaining. Portions of the roof were thrown 50 ft (15 m). A poorly built home was completely destroyed with debris thrown hundreds of feet upstream. A nearby workshop largely collapsed, with only one wall remaining. A graduate study through the University of Florida rated the damage to these structures as mid-range EF2; however, the NWS Forecast Office in Tampa Bay rated the tornado as EF1. Along the southeastern shore of Lake Francis, several more structures sustained minor damage.						
EF1	SSE of Indian Rocks Beach	Pinellas	FL	27.8783°N 82.8437°W	19:40–19:43	0.74 mi (1.19 km)	75 yd (69 m)
EF1	A brief tornado damaged 21 structures; one home had a portion of its roof torn off.						
EF0	W of Pebble Creek	Hillsborough	FL	28.1506°N 82.3747°W	20:39–20:41	1.06 mi (1.71 km)	50 yd (46 m)
EF0	A brief tornado caused minor damage to five homes; pool cages, fences, and trees were also damaged.						
EF1	New Port Richey	Pasco	FL	28.2372°N 82.715°W	21:17–21:19	0.37 mi (0.60 km)	75 yd (69 m)
EF1	Five homes sustained major damage with losses reaching $650,000.						
EF0	SE of Winter Haven	Polk	FL	27.96°N 81.68°W	22:55–22:56	0.92 mi (1.48 km)	25 yd (23 m)
EF0	A brief overturned a semi-trailer and downed trees and power lines.						
EF2	E of Winter Haven	Polk	FL	27.95°N 81.68°W	00:04–00:12	6.22 mi (10.01 km)	150 yd (140 m)
EF2	A strong tornado damaged 17 homes, tore part of the roof off a big box store, and downed power lines.						
EF1	S of St. Pete Beach	Pinellas	FL	27.7°N 82.74°W	00:21–00:25	3.02 mi (4.86 km)	50 yd (46 m)
EF1	A waterspout moved onshore near St. Pete Beach, destroying the top floor of a rental building and damaging a marina.						
EF0	SW of Oakland	Lake	FL	28.4849°N 81.6609°W	00:59–01:05	3.71 mi (5.97 km)	100 yd (91 m)
EF0	A tornado damaged homes and trees on the south and north shores of Johns Lake.						
EF0	SE of Yeehaw Junction	Osceola	FL	27.6694°N 80.8961°W	01:55–02:02	3.08 mi (4.96 km)	100 yd (91 m)
EF0	A tornado touched down in a wooded area near US 441 It traveled north, crossing SR 60 and the Florida Turnpike. A vacant motel and toll booth were damaged. Trees were downed, one of which fell on a car.						
EF1	SE of Sugarmill Woods	Citrus	FL	28.7°N 82.47°W	01:57–02:03	4.99 mi (8.03 km)	100 yd (91 m)
EF1	Two mobile homes were destroyed, a block home suffered severe damage, and 20 homes had minor damage.						
EF0	NE of Deer Park	Osceola	FL	28.1035°N 80.876°W	02:46–02:47	1.15 mi (1.85 km)	50 yd (46 m)
EF0	Damage was primarily confined to pine trees, though one fence was damaged and a pile of aluminum pipes was blown around.						
EF0	WNW of Space Coast Regional Airport	Brevard	FL	28.5314°N 80.8614°W	03:37–03:38	1.17 mi (1.88 km)	25 yd (23 m)
EF0	A brief tornado was observed near SR 50, illuminated by lightning. A few tree limbs were downed.						

=== June 25 event ===
List of reported tornadoes - Monday, June 25, 2012
EF#	Location	County	Coord.	Time (UTC)	Path length	Comments/Damage
Virginia
EF0	NNW of Goochland	Goochland	37.812°N 77.955°W	1825	3.25 miles (5.23 km)	Numerous trees were downed and some structures suffered minor damage.
New Hampshire
EF0	N of West Alton	Belknap	43.65°N 71.31°W	2305	0.1 miles (160 m)	Brief waterspout on Lake Winnipesaukee touched down but quickly dissipated.
Sources: SPC Storm Reports for 06/25/12, NCDC Storm Events Database

=== June 26 event ===
List of confirmed tornadoes – Tuesday, June 26, 2012
EF#	Location	County / Parish	State	Start Coord.	Time (UTC)	Path length	Maximum width
EF0	WNW of Okeechobee	Highlands	FL	27.2714°N 81.023°W	14:25–14:27	1.1 mi (1.8 km)	40 yd (37 m)
EF0	A brief tornado was observed without causing damage.						

=== June 30 event ===
List of reported tornadoes - Saturday, June 30, 2012
EF#	Location	County	Coord.	Time (UTC)	Path length	Comments/Damage
Louisiana
EF0	NNW of Johnson Bayou	Cameron	29.79°N 93.69°W	1700	1.4 miles (2.3 km)	Touchdown over open marsh resulted in no damage.
Virginia
EF0	NE of Mechanicsville	Hanover	37.69°N 77.29°W	0011	7.4 miles (11.9 km)	Numerous trees were downed and a few structures suffered minor damage.
Sources: SPC Storm Reports for 06/30/12, NWS Wakefield, VA, NCDC Storm Events Database

== See also ==
- Tornadoes of 2012
- List of United States tornadoes in April 2012
- List of United States tornadoes from July to September 2012
