= Benson Tower =

Benson Tower can refer to several buildings:

- Benson Tower (New Orleans)
- Benson Tower (Portland, Oregon)

== See also ==
- Benson Water Tower, Clayton Street, Benson, Illinois
- Benson (disambiguation)
