= Benson Lake =

Benson Lake may refer to:

- Benson Lake (California) in Yosemite National Park
- Benson Lake in Oregon's Benson State Recreation Area in the Columbia River Gorge
