= Mount Benson, South Australia =

Mount Benson
- Town
- Coordinates: 37°2′38″S 139°47′57″E
- Country: Australia
- State: South Australia
- LGA: District Council of Robe
- Location: 269 km (167 mi) from Adelaide; 112 km (70 mi) from Mount Gambier
- Established: 28 January 1999

Government
  - State electorate: MacKillop
  - Federal division: Barker

Population
  - Total: 111 (2016 census)
- Time zone: UTC+9:30 (ACST)
  - Summer (DST): UTC+10:30 (ACST)
- Postcode: 5275
- Mean max temp: 19.3 °C (66.7 °F)
- Mean min temp: 10.3 °C (50.5 °F)
- Annual rainfall: 489.4 mm (19.27 in)
Localities around Mount Benson
Ocean	Wangolina; Reedy Creek	Reedy Creek
Ocean; Boatswain Point; Guichen Bay	Mount Benson	Reedy Creek
Robe	Robe; Bray	Bray

Mount Benson is a locality in the Australian state of South Australia located on the state's south-east coast overlooking Guichen Bay which is part of the body of water known in Australia as the Southern Ocean and by international authorities as the Great Australian Bight. It is about 269 kilometres (167 miles) south-east of the Adelaide city centre and 112 kilometres (70 miles) north-west of the centre of Mount Gambier.

Boundaries were created on 28 January 1999 for the "long established name" whose ultimate source is a stockman named Benson who was employed by the pastoralist, Charles Bonney, and whose name was given to the hill called Mount Benson by Charles Bonney according to one source while another source indicates that the hill was named by George Grey, the then Governor of South Australia. A school operated within what is now the locality between the years 1887 and 1970.

The locality contains the hill of the same name and is within the extent of the wine region of the same name. The Southern Ports Highway passes through the locality.

The majority land use within the locality is agriculture with the land adjoining the coastline being zoned for conservation. The latter includes the protected area known as the Guichen Bay Conservation Park.

Mount Benson is located within the federal division of Barker, the state electoral district of MacKillop and the local government area of the District Council of Robe.

== See also ==
- Mount Benson (disambiguation)
- Mount Benson wine region
