= Mount Benson =

Mount Benson may refer to:

Antarctica

- Mount Benson (Antarctica)

Australia

- Mount Benson wine region, a wine region in South Australia
- Mount Benson, South Australia, a locality in South Australia
- Mount Benson (South Australia), a hill in South Australia

Canada

- Mount Benson (British Columbia), a mountain on Vancouver island overlooking Nanaimo
- Mount Benson Elementary School (Nanaimo)

United States

- Mount Benson (Alaska), a mountain near Seward

== See also ==
- Benson (disambiguation)
