= Boatswain Point, South Australia =

Boatswain Point South Australia
- Coordinates: 37°04′48″S 139°45′19″E
- Population: 50 (2016 census)
- Established: 28 January 1999
- Postcode(s): 5275
- Time zone: ACST (UTC+9:30)
  - Summer (DST): ACST (UTC+10:30)
- Location: 260 km (162 mi) SE of Adelaide; 11 km (7 mi) N of Robe
- LGA(s): District Council of Robe
- Region: Limestone Coast
- County: Robe
- State electorate(s): MacKillop
- Federal division(s): Barker
Mean max temp	Mean min temp	Annual rainfall
18.2 °C; 65 °F	10.9 °C; 52 °F	633.5 mm 24.9 in
Suburbs around Boatswain Point:
Ocean	Mount Benson	Mount Benson
Ocean	Boatswain Point	Mount Benson
Ocean	Guichen Bay	Guichen Bay
- Footnotes: Locations; Adjoining localities

Boatswain Point is a locality in the Australian state of South Australia located on the state’s south-east coast overlooking both Guichen Bay and the body of water known in Australia as the Southern Ocean and by international authorities as the Great Australian Bight about 260 kilometres (160 mi) south east of the state capital of Adelaide and about 11 kilometres (6.8 mi) north of the municipal seat of Robe.

Boundaries for the locality were created on 28 January 1999 for “the long established name” and include the site of the Boatswain Point Shack Site. The name is derived from a coastal feature within the locality called Boatswain Point which is itself is reportedly named after a local person known as “Tom the Bosun” who profited from ferrying Chinese immigrants from ships off the coast and guiding them to the goldfields in Victoria during the 1850s. In 1977, the name was used for a private sub-division in part section 477 of the cadastral unit of the Hundred of Waterhouse.

The locality overlooks to its west, a portion of the continental coastline located just north of Guichen Bay and to its south, the coastline of the bay from Cape Thomas in the west to Boatswains Point in the east. Two settlements are located along its west coast behind an area of reserved land. The road system associated with these settlements is connected to the Southern Ports Highway in the east by a road called Boatswain Point Road. Land in the remainder of the locality is used for agricultural purposes.

The 2016 Australian census which was conducted in August 2016 reports that Boatswain Point had a population of 50 people.

Boatswain Point is located within the federal division of Barker, the state electoral district of MacKillop and the local government area of the District Council of Robe.
