= Judge Benson =

Judge Benson may refer to:

- Dee Benson (1948–2020), chief judge of the United States District Court for the District of Utah
- Egbert Benson (1746–1833), judge of the United States Circuit Court for the Second Circuit
- Henry N. Benson (1872–1960), probate judge in Nicollet County, Minnesota, before serving as Minnesota Attorney General
- Paul Benson (judge) (1918–2004), judge of the United States District Court for the District of North Dakota

== See also ==
- Doug Benson (born 1962), American comedian and marijuana rights advocate who judged cases on the show, The High Court with Doug Benson
- Justice Benson (disambiguation)
