= Benson House =

Benson House or Benson Building or variations may refer to:

in the United States (by state then city)

- A. S. Benson House, Loveland, Colorado, listed on the National Register of Historic Places (NRHP) in Larimer County, Colorado
- Benson Building (Ottumwa, Iowa), NRHP-listed in Wapello County
- Benson Building (Baltimore, Maryland), NRHP-listed
- Benson-Hammond House, Linthicum Heights, Maryland, NRHP-listed
- Dr. Theodore J. Benson House, Fromberg, Montana, NRHP-listed in Carbon County, Montana
- John G. Benson House, Englewood, New Jersey, NRHP-listed in Bergen County
- Benson House (Wading River, New York), site of a World War II counterintelligence operation, NRHP-listed
- Judge Henry L. Benson House, Klamath Falls, Oregon, NRHP-listed
- Simon Benson House, Portland, Oregon, NRHP-listed

== See also ==
- Bensen House (Grant, Florida), NRHP-listed
