= John G. Benson House =

Historic house in New Jersey, US

- U.S. National Register of Historic Places
- New Jersey Register of Historic Places
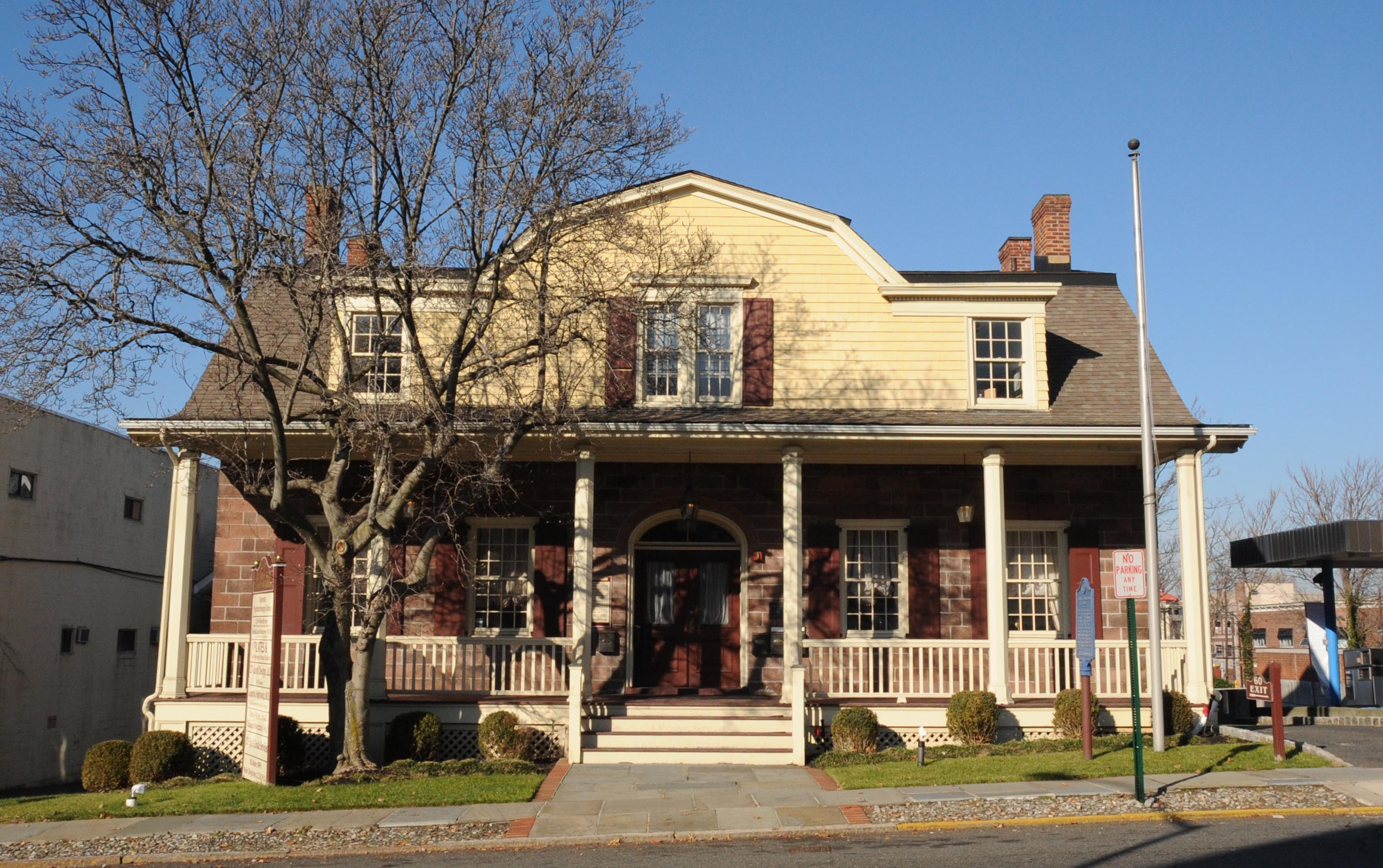
- John G. Benson House in 2015

- Location within Bergen County, New Jersey Location within New Jersey Location within the United States
- Location: 60 Grand Avenue, Englewood, New Jersey
- Coordinates: 40°53′27″N 73°58′30″W
- Built: c. 1800
- Built by: John G. Benson
- MPS: Stone Houses of Bergen County TR
- NRHP reference No.: 83001465
- NJRHP No.: 470

Significant dates
- Added to NRHP: January 9, 1983
- Designated NJRHP: October 3, 1980

The John G. Benson House is located at 60 Grand Avenue in the city of Englewood in Bergen County, New Jersey, United States. The historic stone house was added to the National Register of Historic Places on January 9, 1983. Its historical significance comes from being an example of post-Revolutionary War Dutch Colonial architecture. It was listed as part of the Early Stone Houses of Bergen County Multiple Property Submission (MPS).

== History ==
The house was built around 1800 by farmer and former militia captain John G. Benson. According to the nomination form, architectural evidence suggests that it was built from around 1810 to 1820.

== See also ==
- National Register of Historic Places listings in Bergen County, New Jersey
