= Mount Benson (South Australia) =

Hill in South Australia

- Location within South Australia

Highest point
- Elevation: 77 m (253 ft)
- Coordinates: 37°08′04″S 139°47′51″E

Geography
- Location: South Australia

Mount Benson is a 77-metre (253 ft) high hill located about 10 kilometres (6.2 mi) north north-east of Robe in the south east of South Australia. It was named in 1839 either by Governor Grey after a stockman employed by Charles Bonney or by Bonney himself. Mount Benson itself is located both within the locality of the same name and the wine region of the same name.
