= Benson High School =

Benson High School may refer to:

- Benson High School (Arizona), in Benson, Arizona
- Benson High School (Minnesota), in Benson, Minnesota
- Benson Polytechnic High School, in Portland, Oregon
- Omaha Benson High School Magnet, in Omaha, Nebraska
