= Florence C. Benson Elementary School =

- U.S. National Register of Historic Places
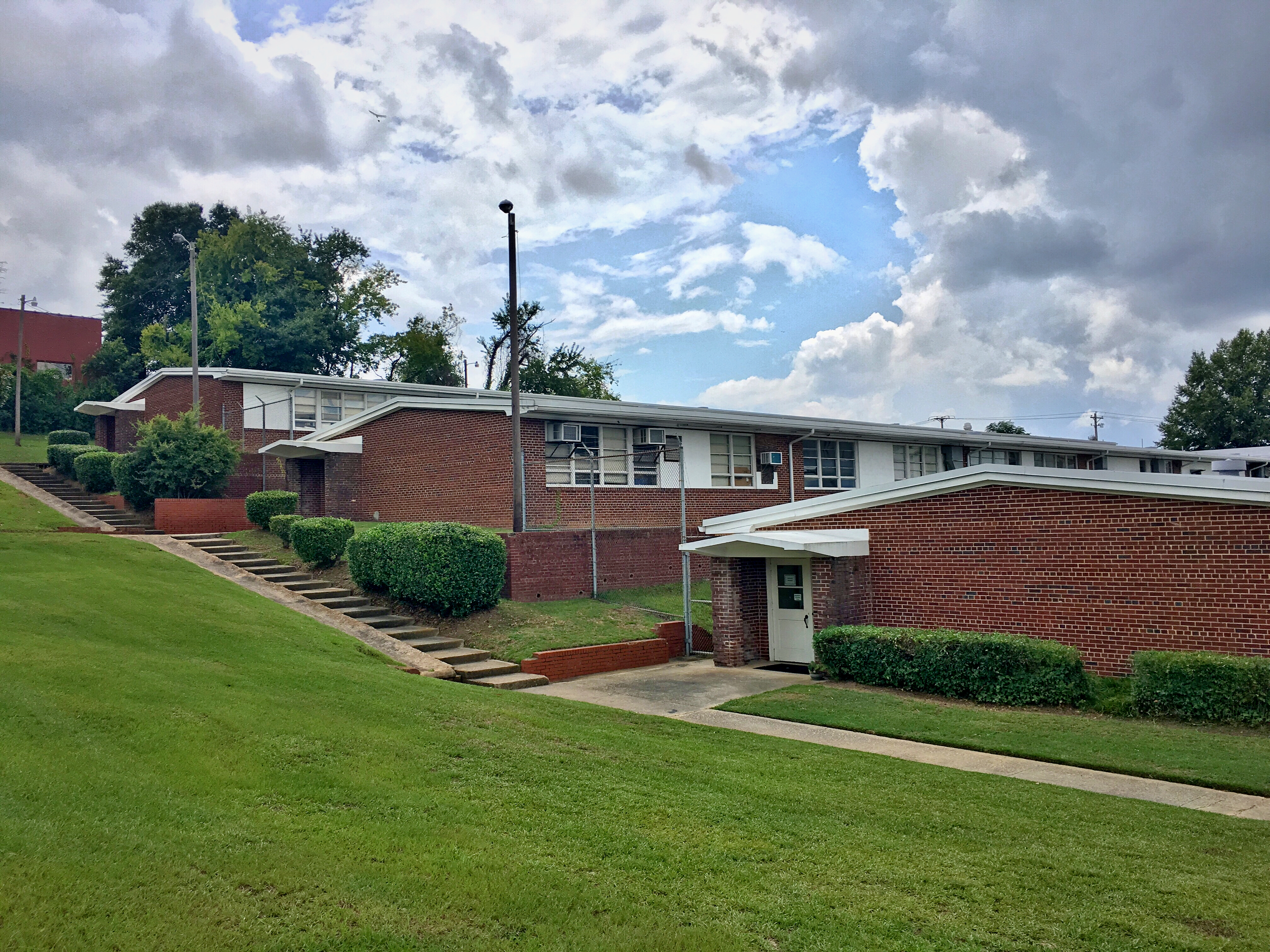

- Location within South Carolina Location within the United States
- Location: 226 Bull St. Columbia, South Carolina
- Coordinates: 33°59′25″N 81°1′21″W
- Area: less than one acre
- Built: 1953-1955
- Architect: Urquhart, James B.
- Architectural style: Modern Movement
- MPS: Historic Resources of Segregation in Columbia, South Carolina, 1880-1960 and Equalization Schools in South Carolina, 1951-1960
- NRHP reference No.: 09000819
- Added to NRHP: October 7, 2009

Florence C. Benson Elementary School, also known as Wheeler Hill School and the Benson Building, is a historic school building for African-American students located at Columbia, South Carolina. It was built in 1953–1955 in Wheeler Hill, a segregated African-American neighborhood, as an "equalization school." The one-story, three-finger plan school, is built of concrete block with a red brick veneer and reflects influences of the Modern and International styles. The school housed 18 classrooms. The school closed in 1975.

It was added to the National Register of Historic Places in 2009.
