= Closter, Nebraska =

Unincorporated community in Nebraska, United States

- Unincorporated Community
- Location within Nebraska Location within the United States
- Coordinates: 41.9°N 97.9°W
- Country: United States
- State: Nebraska
- County: Boone

Closter is an unincorporated community in Boone County, Nebraska, United States.

== History ==
A post office was established at Closter in 1880, and remained in operation until it was discontinued in 1917. The community was named after Henry Closter, a pioneer settler.
