= Benson v SA Mutual Life =

South African legal case

Benson v SA Mutual Life Assurance Society is an important case in South African contract law, particularly in the area of claims for specific performance. It was heard in the Appellate Division, by Corbett JA, Kotzé JA, Hefer JA, Galgut AJA and Cillié AJA, on 7 November 1985, with judgment handed down on 29 November.

The court determined that the granting of an order of specific performance is entirely a matter of the discretion of the court. Apart from the rule that such discretion is to be exercised judicially upon all the relevant facts, no rules should be prescribed to regulate that discretion, as such rules would inevitably curtail the court's discretion and negate or erode the plaintiff's right to select his remedy.

The English rules regulating courts' discretion to order specific performance are predicated upon that remedy's availability by way of equitable relief only; they are inappropriate to South African law. The Appellate Division held, therefore, that the indiscriminate following of English cases in this regard is to be decried.

The decision of the Cape Provincial Division, in SA Mutual Life Assurance Society v Benson (granting an order of specific performance in an action for delivery of shares freely obtainable on the Stock Exchange) was by this reasoning confirmed.

== See also ==
- South African contract law
