= Gulrock, North Carolina =

- Unincorporated community
- Location within North Carolina Location within the United States
- Coordinates: 35°24′52″N 76°05′23″W
- Country: United States
- State: North Carolina
- County: Hyde
- Elevation: 3 ft (0.91 m)
- Time zone: UTC-5 (Eastern (EST))
  - Summer (DST): UTC-4 (EDT)
- Area code: 252
- GNIS feature ID: 1020576

Gulrock is an unincorporated community in Hyde County, North Carolina, United States. Gulrock is 13.5 miles (21.7 km) east of Swan Quarter.

== Education ==
The local school is Mattamuskeet School of Hyde County Schools.
