= Guichen Bay Conservation Park =

Protected area in South Australia

- IUCN category III (natural monument or feature)
- Location within South Australia
- Location: South Australia
- Nearest city: Robe
- Coordinates: 37°5′16″S 139°46′50″E
- Area: 1.27 km^{2} (0.49 sq mi)
- Established: 27 July 1967
- Governing body: Department for Environment and Water

Guichen Bay Conservation Park (formerly the Guichen Bay National Park) is a protected area in the Australian state of South Australia overlooking Guichen Bay located in the gazetted locality of Mount Benson about 8 kilometres (5.0 miles) north of the town centre of Robe.

The conservation park consists of land in sections 360, 361, 555, 575 and 576 in the cadastral unit of the Hundred of Waterhouse. Sections 360 and 361 were proclaimed on 27 July 1976 as the Guichen Bay National Park under the National Parks Act 1966. On 27 April 1972, it was reconstituted as the Guichen Bay Conservation Park under the National Parks and Wildlife Act 1972. Section 555 was added to the conservation park on 9 September 1976 followed by Sections 575 and 576 on 21 March 1991. As of 2018, it covered an area of 1.27 square kilometres (0.49 sq mi).

The following statements sourced respectively from the conservation park’s management plan and the now-discontinued Register of the National Estate summarises its conservation significance:

The Park contains some of the Guichen Bay beach ridge plain; a classic example of Holocene beach ridge development of worldwide interest which records the naturalhistory of the Bay over the last 7000 years.

Because of its inaccessibility this Park is rarely visited by people. The fairly dense coastal heath provides a home for the secretive Dasyornis broadbenti (rufous bristle bird), while along the seashore dotterels and oystercatchers are common.

The conservation park is classified as an IUCN Category III protected area. In 1980, it was listed on the now-defunct Register of the National Estate.

== See also ==
- Protected areas of South Australia
