= J.E. Benson Public School =

Coordinates: 42.30832°N 83.05455°W

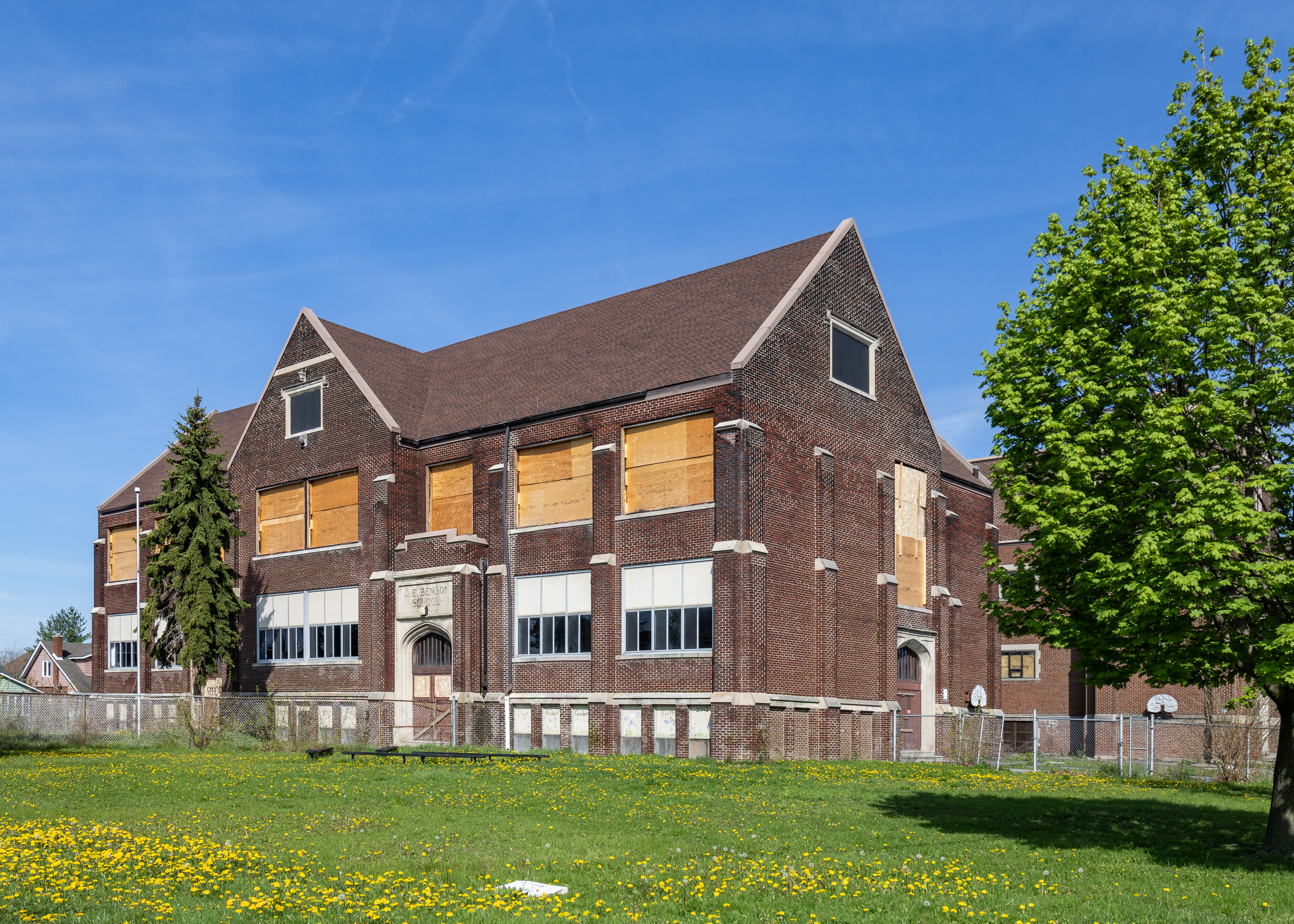
The former Benson Public School in 2026

J.E. Benson Public School (formerly Wyandotte Street School) was an elementary school in Windsor, Ontario, Canada. J.E. Benson School was administered by the Greater Essex County District School Board, which also services sixty-one other elementary schools located in Windsor, Ontario and Essex County, Ontario.

== History ==
Construction began in 1914, just before the outbreak of the First World War; the school opened in April 1915. Originally named Wyandotte Street School, the building contained twelve classrooms and a Manual Training Room. Ten of the rooms were in use by 1916, and by 1917 the school was in full use. J.E. Benson's, or at the time Wyandotte Street School's, first principal was Mr. Fred Snider and the first recorded attendance was 95 students.

=== Addition ===
In 1921–1922, Sandwich Township was annexed by the city of Windsor; this included a three-room school that now fell under the jurisdiction of the Wyandotte Street School. The combination of students from Sandwich Township and the rapid population growth being experienced by the city from the post-war twenties, made it necessary for the School Board to provide additional rooms and accordingly built a fifteen-room addition. The new addition officially opened at noon, Thursday December 20, 1923, the elementary school re-opened as a full Rotary School hosting 900 pupils "making it the largest institution of its kind in Western Ontario" at the time.

=== Re-naming: becoming J.E. Benson School ===
On August 12, 1936, at the age of 63 Inspector John Edward Benson died from a heart attack. The Board of education decided to honour Mr. Benson by renaming Wyandotte Street School, giving it its current name, J.E. Benson School. A commemorative plaque can be seen hung in the hallway to the Auditorium.

== J. E. Benson ==
J. E. Benson was the son of James Benson and Angeline Parliament; he was a resident of Roblin's Mills, Prince Edward County. Benson taught in public schools around Prince Edward County until he became the inspector for public schools in Prince Edward County, after his graduation from Queen's University. Inspector Benson was first appointed to His Windsor position on December 16, 1919; he started his duties February 1, 1920. Benson was the first educationalist to bring the rotary system to Canadian schools; he was a trusted school inspector for twenty five years. Inspector Benson died from a heart attack on August 12, 1936, after returning to his summer home, his usual custom following the closing of schools for the summer; he "looked in good health" when he retired for the night but suffered from a heart attack and died before help arrived.

== Mascot ==
The mascot for J.E. Benson Public School was the Bobcat; students were also known as "The Benson Bobcats".

== Principals ==
Year	Principal
1915–1920	Mr. Fred Snider
1920–1945	Mr. Thomas W. Draper
1945–1959	Mr. Peter McCallum
1959–1960	Mr. Stuart Tuck
1960–1963	Mr. Harvey Brown
1963–1969	Mr. Harold Kidd
1969–1971	Mr. Arthur Kidd
1971–1979	Mr. Robert C. McIntosh
1979–1988	Mr. George Sutton
1988–1990	Mr. Ken Angus
1990–1995	Mr. Wayne French
1995-1998	Mr. William Chantler
1998-2001	Ms. Louise Rea
2001-2005	Mr. Joe Younan
2005-2010	Ms. Francine Voy
2010-2014	Ms. Patricia Oshar

== List of staff: 2012–13 ==
Grade	Teacher
Principal	Mrs. Oshar
Vice-Principal	Mrs. Muzzin
Secretary	Mrs. Sandrin
JK/SK	Ms. Bonato
	Mrs. Mialkowski / Mrs. Adjin
JK/SK	Mrs. Masotti
	Mrs. Ryan
JK/SK	Mrs. Pickersgill
	Mrs. Merlo
Grade 1	Mrs. Crowder
Grade 1/2	Mrs. Gelinas
Grade 1/2	Ms. Moffatt
Grade 2/3	Mrs. Zaidan / Mrs. Greer
Grade 3	Mrs. Li-Dickinson
Grade 4	Mr. McGinnis
Grade 4/5	Mr. Jenkins
Grade 5/6	Mrs. Vidamour
Grade 5/6	Mr. Malmberg
Grade 7/8	Miss Colebrook
Grade 7/8	Mr. Kennedy
S.E.R.R.	Miss Landry
S.E.R.R.	Mrs. Harrison
LST	Mrs. Laberi
Music	Mr. Williamson
FSL	Mme. Kazoun
FSL	Mme. Gigliotti / Mme. Atris
