= Justice Benson =

Justice Benson may refer to:

- Alfred W. Benson (1843–1916), associate justice of the Kansas Supreme Court
- Henry L. Benson (1854–1921), associate justice of the Oregon Supreme Court

== See also ==
- Judge Benson (disambiguation)
