= Benson Water Tower =

- Formerly listed on the U.S. National Register of Historic Places
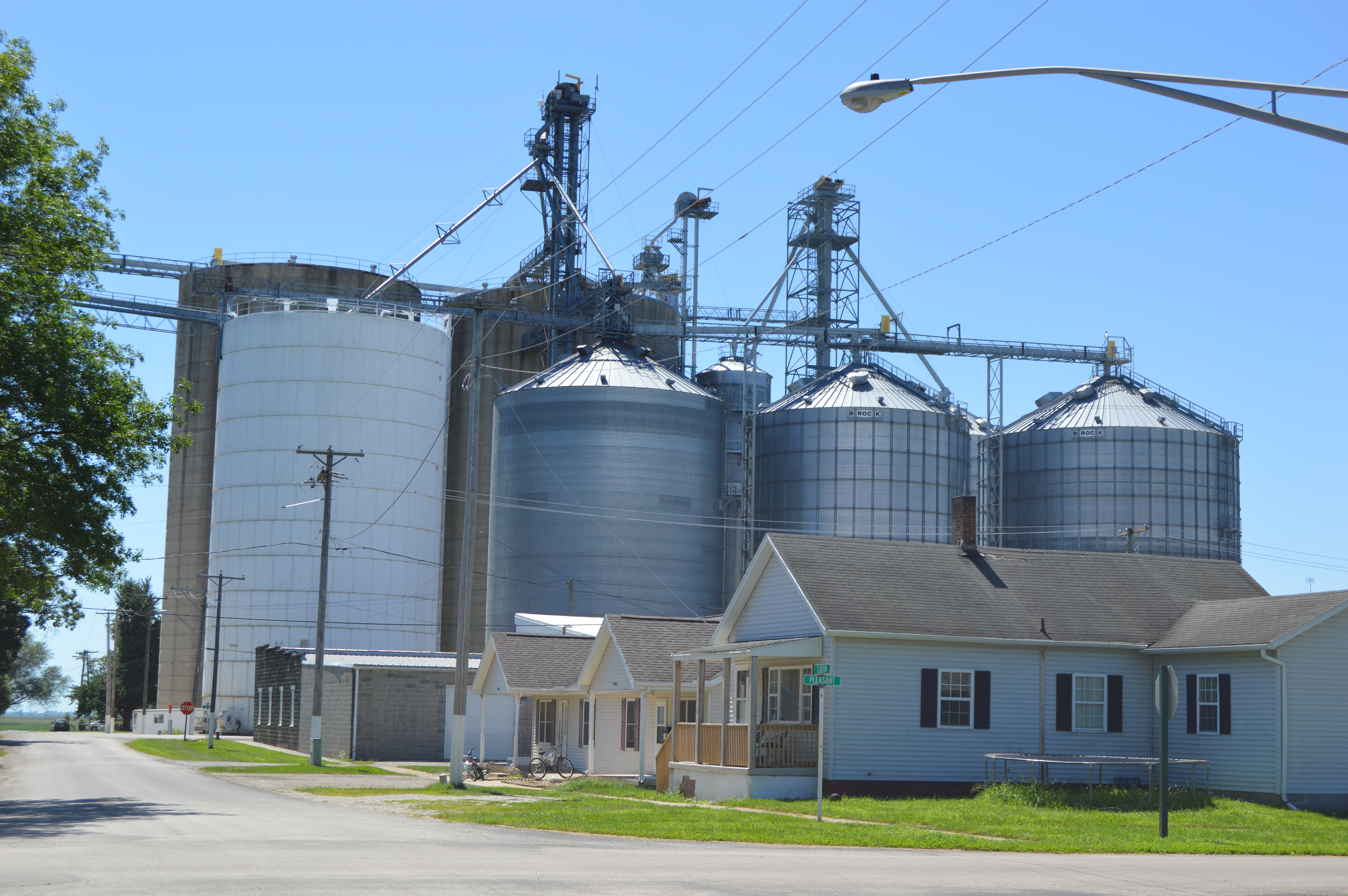
- Site of the tower, now occupied by the farther of the two houses

- Location within Illinois Location within the United States
- Location: Clayton St. between Front and Pleasant Sts., Benson, Illinois
- Coordinates: 40°51′3.5″N 89°7′13.5″W
- Area: less than one acre
- Built: 1891
- Architect: Fitchen Bros.
- NRHP reference No.: 87002034

Significant dates
- Added to NRHP: November 20, 1987
- Removed from NRHP: January 2, 2020

The Benson Water Tower was a water tower located on Clayton Street in Benson, Illinois. The tower was built in 1891, in response to several serious fires in Benson; it supplied the village with water until 1985. The tall brick tower had a large wooden water tank on top. The tower was added to the National Register of Historic Places in 1987. It has since been demolished, and was delisted in 2020.

== Description ==
The round, red brick tower was 65 feet (20 m) tall with a base diameter of 16 feet 2 inches (4.93 m) that tapered to 14 feet 1 inch (4.29 m) at its top. The bricks used for the tower were made in Benson's own brickyard. The tower was topped by a 20-foot (6.1 m) tall redwood water tank; steel bands held the tank's wooden planks together. The tank held 15,000 barrels of water when full and was connected to the ground by a 6-inch (150 mm) diameter supply pipe. Ladders allowed access to both the inside and outside of the tower, and a catwalk surrounded the barrel.

== History ==
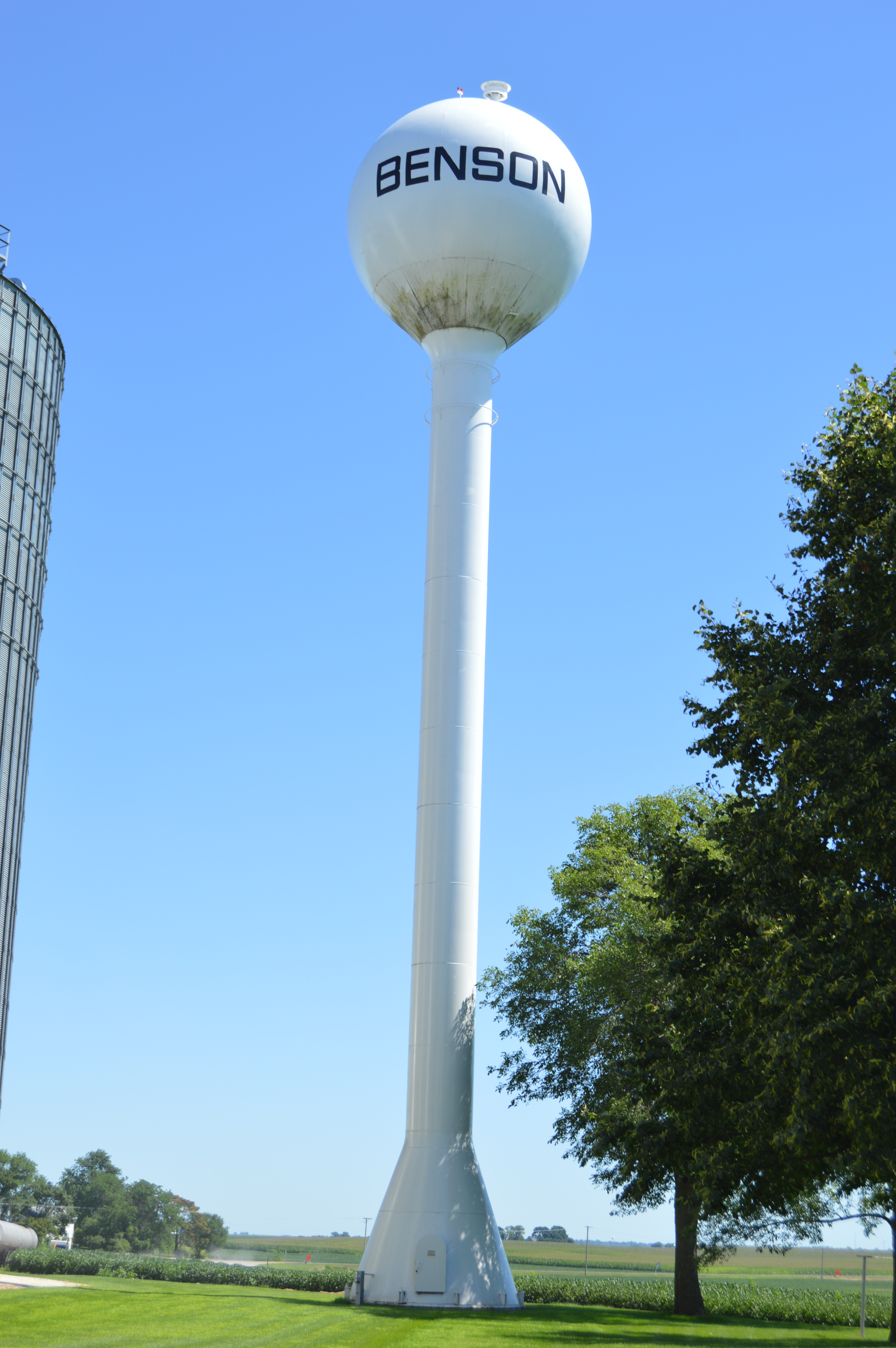
Replacement water tower

The village of Benson experienced major fires in its business district in 1884 and 1889, hindering its development as a commercial center. In response, citizens petitioned the village for improved fire protection, and the village commissioned the water tower in 1891. Fitchen Brothers Construction built the tower for $6,400, or approximately $229,333 in present-day terms. The new water tower led to economic and population growth in the village as new houses and businesses received a steady water supply from the tower. The tower also provided water to farms in the surrounding area, who transported water from the city to supplement their wells, as well as to steam trains on the Chicago, Pekin and Southwestern Railroad. Due to the tower's height, it became a town landmark that could be seen for miles. The water tower provided the village's water until 1985, when a new water tower was constructed.

The water tower was added to the National Register of Historic Places on November 20, 1987. It has since been demolished.
