= Benson, Howard County, Maryland =

Unincorporated community in Maryland, United States

Benson, Maryland
- Unincorporated community
- Location within Maryland
- Coordinates: 39°16′26″N 76°57′02″W
- Country: United States
- State: Maryland
- County: Howard
- Elevation: 531 ft (162 m)
- Time zone: UTC−5 (Eastern (EST))
  - Summer (DST): UTC−4 (EDT)
- Area codes: 410 & 443
- GNIS feature ID: 1707882

Benson is an unincorporated community in Howard County, Maryland, United States. Benson is located 8 miles (13 km) west of Ellicott City.
