= Benson, Illinois =

Benson
- Village
- Location of Benson in Woodford County, Illinois.
- Coordinates: 40°51′03″N 89°07′16″W
- Country: United States
- State: Illinois
- County: Woodford

Area
  - Total: 0.16 sq mi (0.42 km^{2})
  - Land: 0.16 sq mi (0.42 km^{2})
  - Water: 0 sq mi (0.00 km^{2})
- Elevation: 764 ft (233 m)

Population (2020)
  - Total: 412
  - Density: 2,522.2/sq mi (973.81/km^{2})
- Time zone: UTC-6 (CST)
  - Summer (DST): UTC-5 (CDT)
- Zip code: 61516
- Area code: 309
- FIPS code: 17-05261
- GNIS feature ID: 2398096
- Website: www.villageofbenson.com

Benson is a village in Woodford County, Illinois, United States. As of the 2020 census, Benson had a population of 412. It is part of the Peoria, Illinois Metropolitan Statistical Area.

== History ==
The village was established in 1874 with the construction of the Chicago, Pekin and Southwestern Railroad. The town was named after S.H. Benson of Streator, Illinois, the railroad's general freight manager. The grid layout of the town is aligned to the line of the former railroad, rather than the usual north-south orientation. A post office was established in 1873. East Friselanders, Plattdeutsch-speaking Lutherans, settled in the Benson area in 1858.

The Benson Water Tower was replaced with a modern water tower in the 1980s and has since been demolished.

== Geography ==
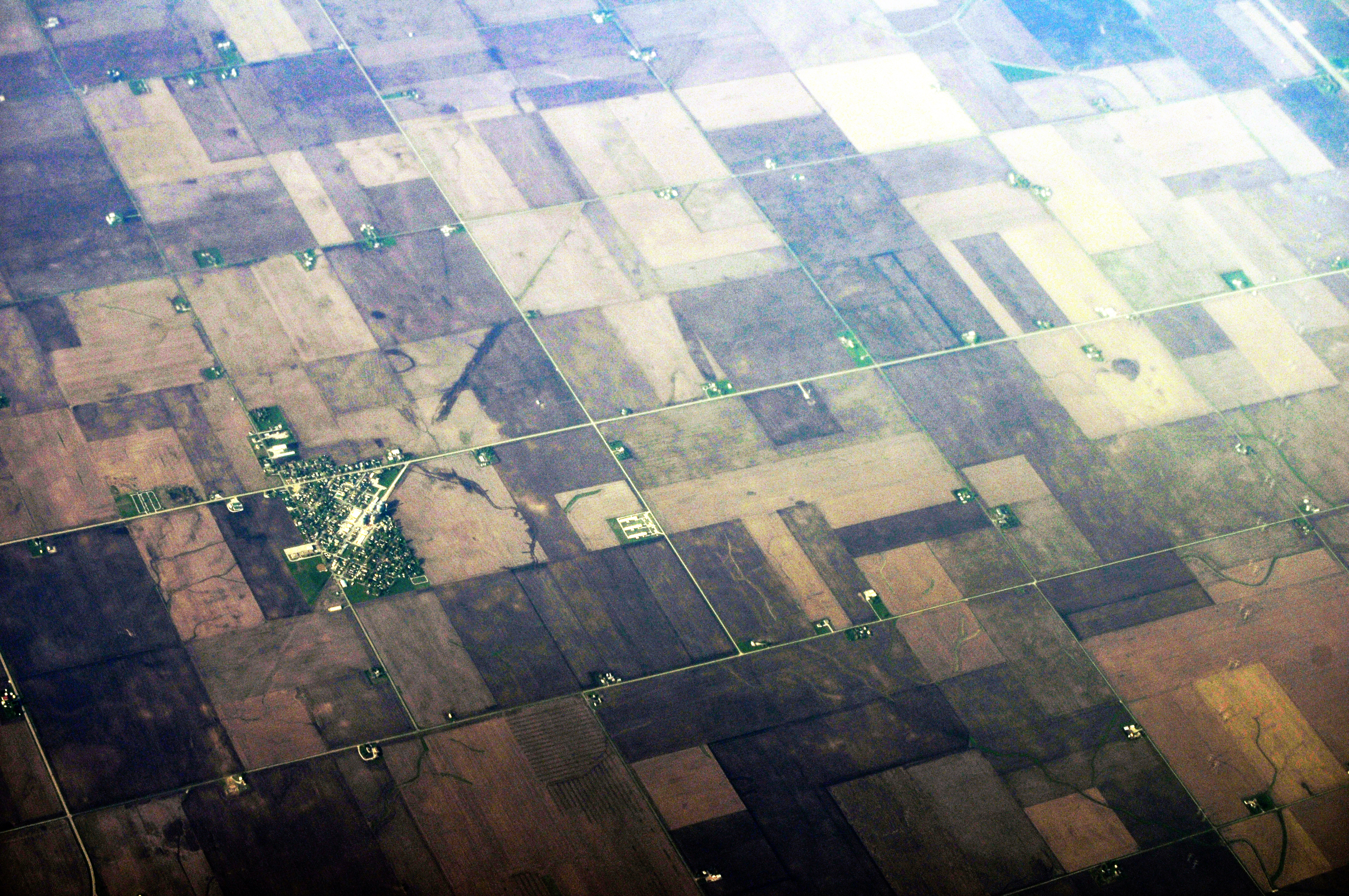
Aerial view of Benson, 2012

According to the 2010 census, Benson has a total area of 0.17 square miles (0.44 km^{2}), all land.

== Demographics ==
Historical population
Census	Pop.	Note	%±
1880	287		—
1890	338		17.8%
1900	367		8.6%
1910	362		−1.4%
1920	414		14.4%
1930	334		−19.3%
1940	358		7.2%
1950	387		8.1%
1960	427		10.3%
1970	490		14.8%
1980	460		−6.1%
1990	410		−10.9%
2000	408		−0.5%
2010	423		3.7%
2020	412		−2.6%
U.S. Decennial Census

As of the census of 2000, there were 408 people, 172 households, and 117 families residing in the village. The population density was 2,338.6 inhabitants per square mile (902.9/km^{2}). There were 183 housing units at an average density of 1,048.9 per square mile (405.0/km^{2}). The racial makeup of the village was 99.26% White, 0.25% Asian, and 0.49% from two or more races. Hispanic or Latino of any race were 0.25% of the population.

There were 172 households, out of which 27.3% had children under the age of 18 living with them, 61.0% were married couples living together, 6.4% had a female householder with no husband present, and 31.4% were non-families. 27.9% of all households were made up of individuals, and 17.4% had someone living alone who was 65 years of age or older. The average household size was 2.37 and the average family size was 2.92.

In the village, the population was spread out, with 24.3% under the age of 18, 7.4% from 18 to 24, 26.0% from 25 to 44, 16.9% from 45 to 64, and 25.5% who were 65 years of age or older. The median age was 40 years. For every 100 females, there were 98.1 males. For every 100 females age 18 and over, there were 91.9 males.

The median income for a household in the village was $40,500, and the median income for a family was $55,536. Males had a median income of $37,031 versus $21,161 for females. The per capita income for the village was $19,358. About 5.0% of families and 4.1% of the population were below the poverty line, including none of those under age 18 and 9.8% of those age 65 or over.

== Education ==
It is in the Roanoke-Benson Community Unit School District 60.
