= Benson Lake (California) =

- Location within California
- Location: Yosemite National Park, Tuolumne County, California, United States
- Coordinates: 38.015°N 119.530°W
- Type: lake

Benson Lake is a lake in Yosemite National Park, United States.

Benson Lake was named for Harry Coupland Benson, a Yosemite National Park official. Benson Lake has a surface elevation of 2310m. It is located just 700m down a spur trail from the Pacific Crest Trail and has a broad, sandy beach. The Pacific Crest Trail reaches its lowest point between Sonora Pass, 67 km to the north, and Devil's Postpile National Monument 100 km to the south, at the junction with this spur trail.

== See also ==
- List of lakes in California
