= Illinois High School Association =

School sports organization in Illinois, USA

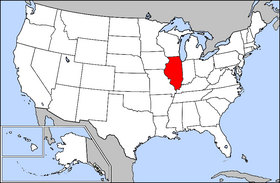
- Abbreviation: IHSA
- Formation: December 27, 1900
- Legal status: Association
- Purpose: Athletic/Educational
- Headquarters: 2715 McGraw Dr. Bloomington, IL 61704; 40.467311°N 88.950838°W
- Region served: Illinois
- Members: 777 high schools
- Executive Director: Craig Anderson
- Affiliations: National Federation of State High School Associations
- Staff: 26
- Website: ihsa.org

The Illinois High School Association (IHSA) is an association that regulates competition of interscholastic sports and some interscholastic activities at the high school level for the U.S. state of Illinois. It is a charter member of the National Federation of State High School Associations (NFHS). The IHSA regulates 14 sports for boys, 15 sports for girls, and eight co-educational non-athletic activities. More than 760 public and private high schools in the state of Illinois are members of the IHSA. The Association's offices are in Bloomington, Illinois.

In its over 100 years of existence, the IHSA has been at the center of many controversies. Some of these controversies (inclusion of sports for girls, the inclusion of private schools, drug testing, and the use of the term "March Madness") have had national resonance, or paralleled the struggles seen in other states across the country. Other controversies (geographic advancement of teams to the state playoff series, struggles between small schools and large schools, particular rules unique to Illinois competition) are more of a local focus.

== Governance ==
The Illinois High School Association (IHSA) is governed according to the rules of its constitution. This constitution covers the broadest policies of the Association, such as membership, governance, officers and their duties, and meeting requirements.

The IHSA is led by an eleven-member Board of Directors. All eleven members are high school principals from member schools. Seven of the ten are elected to three-year terms from seven geographic regions within the state of Illinois. Three other board members are elected at-large. A treasurer, who does not vote, is appointed by the Board. The Board of Directors determines IHSA policies and employs an executive director and staff. They also work with the Illinois General Assembly, the Illinois State Board of Education, the Illinois Principals Association, the Illinois Association of School Boards, the Illinois Association of School Administrators, the Illinois Athletic Directors Association and the North Central Association.

The IHSA also has a 35-member Legislative Commission, consisting of 21 high school principals, seven high school athletic directors elected from each of the seven state regions, and seven at-large members. The commission reviews amendment proposals to the IHSA Constitution and By-laws, and determines which are passed on to a vote of the member schools. Each school receives one vote on any amendments, with voting taking place annually in December. Changes are passed by simple majority of member schools.

The day-to-day running of the Association is charged to an administrative staff of nine, one of whom acts in the position of Executive Director. This group is directly responsible for setting up and running the individual state playoff series in each sport and activity. They also supervise annual meetings with advisory committees from each sport and activity to review possible changes in the rules. They also coordinate committees on issues from sportsmanship and sports medicine to media relations and corporate sponsorship.

Subordinate to the Constitution and By-Laws are a number of policies. These policies are generally of greater interest to the public, as they more specifically deal with issues that affect the day-to-day operation of sports and activities. Examples of policies include individual athlete eligibility, rules governing the addition of new sports and activities, the classification of schools (1A, 2A, 3A, etc.), and media relations.

The key policy that has been a cornerstone to the IHSA is its policy on grouping and seeding tournaments:

1. The State Series is designed to determine a State Champion. The State Series is not intended to necessarily advance the best teams in the state to the State Final.

The IHSA is built upon the concept of geographic representation in its state playoff series.

== History ==
=== Early years ===
The IHSA was founded on December 27, 1900, at a rump session of the Illinois Principals Association. Known as the Illinois High School Athletic Association for the first 40 years of its existence, the IHSA is the second oldest of the 52 state high school associations. Only the Wisconsin Interscholastic Athletic Association outdates it, by two years.

For the greater part of a decade, the IHSA was concerned mostly with establishing school control over interscholastic athletic programs and setting eligibility standards for competition. Ringers were a persistent problem, and among schoolboy sports, football was a special concern. In this period, severe injuries and even deaths were not uncommon, and there was much talk of banning football completely.

In 1908, the IHSA's mission expanded in an unforeseen direction when its board was convinced by Lewis Omer of Oak Park and River Forest High School to sponsor a statewide basketball tournament. Although a handful of other state associations had sponsored track meets, none had ever attempted to organize a statewide basketball tournament. The first tournament, an 11-team invitational held at the Oak Park YMCA, was a financial success. Subsequent state tournaments, which were open to all member schools, provided the IHSA with fiscal independence, an important new vehicle to spread its message, and ever-increasing name recognition among the public.

By 1922, the affairs of the Association became so time-consuming that its board hired a full-time manager, C. W. Whitten. As vice president of the Board, Whitten had recently reorganized the basketball tournament and reduced the size of the state finals from 21 teams to four. About the same time, the IHSA became a charter member of the National Federation of State High School Associations. In addition to his IHSA responsibilities, Whitten ran the business affairs of the NFHS, at first unofficially, and after 1927 with the official title of general manager.

From this dual stage, Whitten and his assistant manager at the IHSA, H. V. Porter, exerted unusual influence over high school sports, not only in Illinois, but across the nation. In one memorable battle, Whitten took on the "grand old man" of college football, Amos Alonzo Stagg of the University of Chicago and effectively shut down his national tournament for high school basketball champions. Porter served on several NFHS committees and helped develop the molded basketball and the fan-shaped backboard, among other inventions. Porter later became the first full-time executive of the NFHS.

As the Association matured, member schools requested sponsorship of state tournaments in sports other than basketball. The first such move came in 1927, when the IHSA took over control of the Illinois Interscholastic, a festival of high school track, golf, and tennis run by the University of Illinois. The meet continued to be held on the campus in Champaign–Urbana, but as with basketball, IHSA involvement opened the field to all IHSA member schools and removed non-member schools, including a handful of out-of-state schools. The IHSA subsequently established state series in several other boys' sports: swimming and diving (1932), wrestling (1937), baseball (1940), cross country (1946), and gymnastics (1958) (gymnastics had a University of Illinois sponsored state meet from 1952 through 1957). Few of these series were self-supporting, but the ever-popular basketball tournament – sometimes referred to as the "goose that laid the golden egg" – paid the freight for all.

Of the many challenges faced by Whitten during his 20-year career, the one with the longest-lasting repercussions was the reorganization of 1940. Prior to this time, two large groups of Illinois high schools remained outside of IHSA control: private schools, which were not eligible for membership, and the public schools of Chicago, which were eligible but had joined only sporadically. The new constitution approved in 1940 extended the privileges of membership to non-public schools and gave limited autonomy to the Chicago schools, which subsequently joined en masse. In addition, non-athletic activities such as speech and music were added to the IHSA's menu, prompting the elimination of the word "Athletic" from the Association's name.

1941 saw one of the first serious challenges to IHSA authority, when the association banned high school bands from competing nationally. When a bill was introduced in the Illinois General Assembly to transfer the IHSA's authority to the state superintendent's office, the IHSA moved to change the ban, and give local athletic directors a greater voice in decision making. Also that year, the IHSA allowed private schools to participate for the first time.

In 1942, as World War II started to have an effect on American life, many schools began dropping less popular sports as transportation and hiring qualified coaches became a serious issue. The association polled its membership to investigate the possibility of ending the spring sports season. The poll supported keeping the season. All over the country, as gas rationing threatened to prevent teams and officials from traveling, IHSA Secretary Al Willis was able to get special exemptions for Illinois teams and officials; a precedent that spread to other states, very likely saving high school competitions during the war. By 1943, the IHSA had to look at making changes to its rules regarding eligible coaches, and the prospect of military veterans returning to high school. Ironically, the federal government eventually did put a limit to post season travel for high schools in May, 1945; too late to stop Illinois' spring tournaments, and just in time to herald the end of the war. In the end, the IHSA did not curtail its sports tournaments throughout the war.

==== Private school multiplier ====
The success of non-public schools in IHSA tournaments has led to considerable debate among the members, 83% of which are public schools. In 1985, the Interstate Eight Conference proposed a bylaw that the IHSA should exclude private schools from competing in state tournaments, though the membership voted this proposal down.

==== 1995 wrestling controversy ====
In 1995, Mt. Carmel (Chicago), under coach Bill Weick, entered the end of the wrestling season ranked third in the nation by USA Today, and was poised to win its fourth consecutive state dual team title. Just prior to their Regional tournament, the IHSA learned that the school had competed in too many invitational tournaments, and disqualified the school from further competing as a team. Mt. Carmel did not deny the assertion; however, they claimed that one of the varsity tournaments had only had JV and frosh-soph wrestlers competing. Mt. Carmel won a temporary injunction from the Cook County Circuit Court to permit their team to compete in the regionals. While the individual tournaments progressed, Mt. Carmel won a court victory, which forced the IHSA to permit the team to wrestle. When the IHSA's appeal was denied, and after temporarily suspending the tournament, the IHSA decided to end the season without a Class AA state championship dual team tournament; the first time in the history of the Association that a state tournament had been cancelled due to a cause other than war.

==== Media usage restrictions ====
On November 1, 2007, the Illinois Press Association (IPA) and two newspapers (the Northwest Herald and the State Journal-Register) filed for a temporary restraining order to prohibit the IHSA from enforcing its policy restricting the use of photographs taken at its state final events. The IHSA's policy, similar to those adopted by the NCAA, colleges such as Illinois State University and the University of Illinois, and other state high school associations, allows news-gathering organizations to sell photos that are published but prohibits the sale (usually through a Web site) of the many photos taken at the event that are not published. A circuit court judge denied the motion on November 5 and encouraged the parties to renew talks to resolve the impasse. The plaintiffs withdrew their request for a preliminary injunction on November 16 as talks continued.

On December 5, 2007, the IHSA announced that it had filed a countersuit to the IPA seeking a resolution to the ongoing issue, citing a failure on the part of the IPA to continue talks, and the ongoing sale of photographs.

In January, 2008, it was announced that State Representative Joseph Lyons had submitted Illinois House Bill 4582, which would prevent the IHSA from enforcing its ban on press outlets from selling pictures of IHSA events.

In April, 2008, the IHSA and the Illinois Press Association jointly announced a cessation of hostilities that gave the press permission to sell photographs without hindrance from the IHSA

==== Performance-enhancing drug testing ====
On January 14, 2008, the IHSA announced that, based on a survey of 54% of its principals, it would move forward to design and implement a program to test for the presence of performance-enhancing drugs in student athletes participating in select State Series competitions. While details have not been worked out, based on the vote of the principals, the membership would not favor forcing a team to forfeit in the event of a positive test, though the membership, which voted overwhelmingly favored to support a period of ineligibility for athletes testing positive, and narrowly supported forcing schools to adopt education programs if an athlete tested positive.

== Sanctioned sports ==
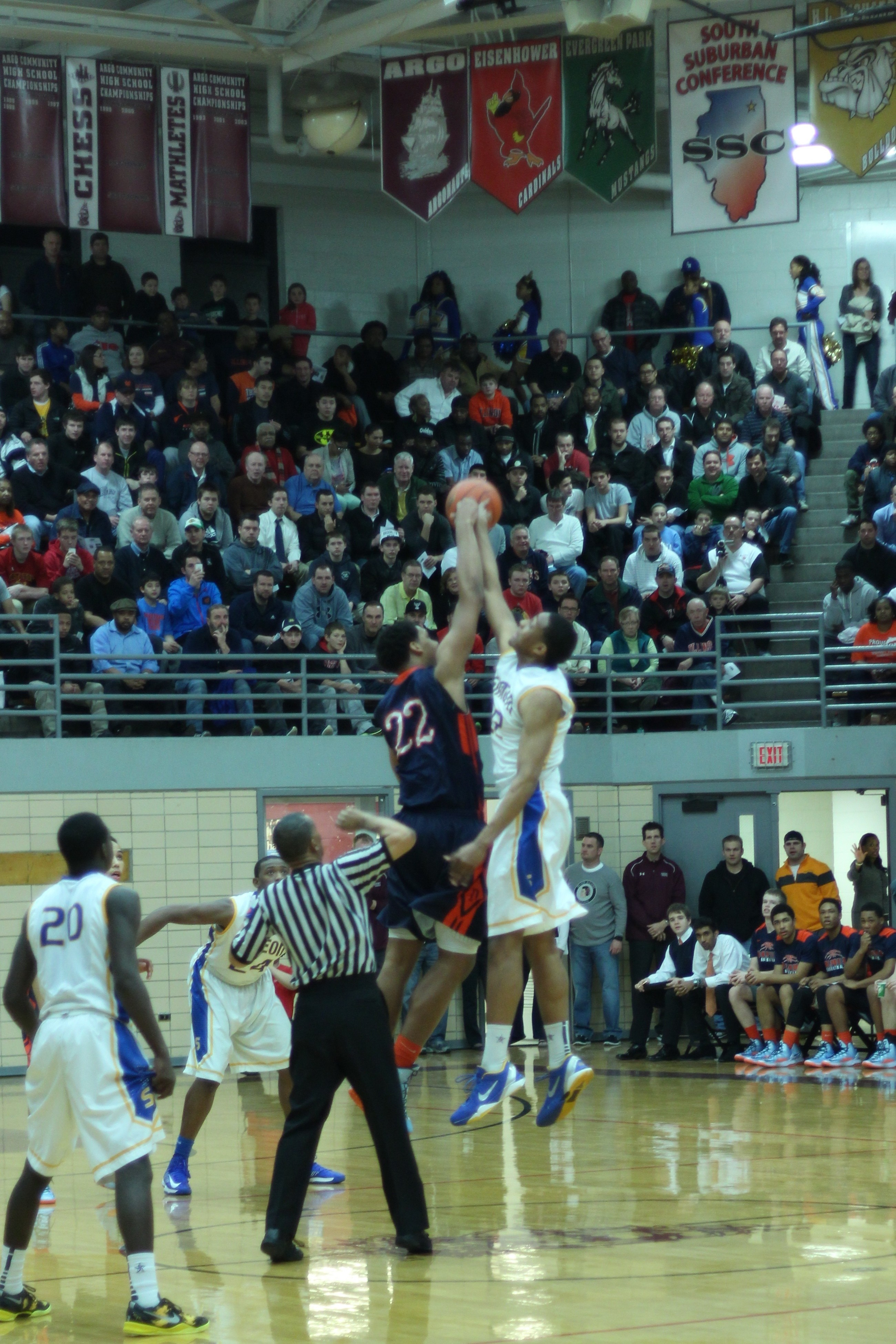
Jabari Parker (white) and Jahlil Okafor (blue) during opening jump ball on March 8, 2013 IHSA sectional championship

Sport	First IHSA State Series	Most Team Championships	Current Season
Badminton (girls)	1977	8–New Trier HS	spring
Baseball	1940	6–Providence Catholic HS	spring
Basketball (boys)	1908	7–Simeon Career Academy	winter
Basketball (girls)	1977	8–Marshall HS (Chicago)	winter
Bowling (boys)	2003	3–Andrew HS	winter
Bowling (girls)	1973	6–Machesney Park, Harlem High School/Lockport Township HS (tie)	winter
Competitive Cheerleading (girls/co-ed) ^{2}	2006	7–Lincoln-Way East High School/Lemont High School	winter
Competitive Dance (girls)	2013	5–Geneva H	winter
Cross Country (boys)	1946	28–York HS	fall
Cross Country (girls)	1979	12–Winnebago HS	fall
Flag Football (girls)	2024	1–Fremd HS newly-sanctioned	fall
Football ^{10}	1974	17-Mount Carmel High School (Chicago)	fall
Golf (boys)	1938^{3}	10–University HS	fall
Golf (girls)	1975	8–Regina Dominican HS	fall
Gymnastics (boys)	1952	9–Hinsdale Central HS	spring
Gymnastics (girls)	1977	12–Fremd HS	winter
Lacrosse (boys)	2010	6–Loyola Academy/New Trier HS (tie)	spring
Lacrosse (girls)	2010	2–New Trier HS (Note: Only partial records are available.)	spring
Soccer (boys)	1972	10–Granite City HS	fall
Soccer (girls)	1988	8–St. Charles East HS	spring
Softball (girls)	1976	7–Casey-Westfield HS	spring
Swimming & Diving (boys)	1932	23–New Trier HS	winter
Swimming & Diving (girls)	1975	14–New Trier HS	fall
Tennis (boys)	1936^{4}	24–Hinsdale Central HS	spring
Tennis (girls)	1972	17–Hinsdale Central HS	fall
Track & Field (boys)	1893	17–Oak Park-River Forest HS	spring
Track & Field (girls)	1973	14—East St. Louis Lincoln HS^{5}	spring
Volleyball (boys)	1992	7–Wheaton-Warrenville South HS	spring
Volleyball (girls)	1975	17–Mother McAuley HS	fall
Water Polo (boys)	2002	10–Fenwick HS	spring
Water Polo (girls)	2002	9–Fenwick HS	spring
Wrestling (boys) ^{10}	1937	16-Montini Catholic HS	winter
Wrestling (girls)	2021	no team event	winter

Technically, with the exception of baseball, sports with boys teams having no accompanying girls teams are officially both boys & girls teams. Participation of girls on these boys & girls teams is uncommon, as it is in other states with similar arrangements. Girls teams with no accompanying "boys" team are girls only.

On October 13, 2009, the IHSA announced that it would begin sponsoring a state series in lacrosse for both boys and girls starting in 2010–11.

== Sanctioned non-athletic activities ==
Sport	First IHSA State Series	Most Championships
Bass Fishing	2009	1--8-Way Tie
Chess	1975	7--University HS
Debate^{9}	1941	20--Glenbrook North HS
Drama and Group Interpretation	1941	17--Homewood-Flossmoor HS
Journalism	2006	2—Naperville Central High School, Homewood-Flossmoor HS
Music	1973	32--Herscher HS
Scholastic Bowl	1987	12--Illinois Math and Science Academy
Speech Individual Events	1941	16--Downers Grove South High School

Note: Some Illinois high schools field competitive teams in events such as fencing, field hockey, and ice hockey, but the IHSA does not sponsor tournaments in these events.

Other academic competitions, such as Academic Decathlon, Science Olympiad, and DECA are not sponsored by the IHSA, and are governed by their respective national and/or state agencies.

== Notable medalists in IHSA sponsored state series ==
- Lou Boudreau (Thornton HS) • announcer and Hall-of-Fame baseball player • led his high school basketball team to 1933 state title and to second place in 1934 and 1935. He was named to the IHSA's 100 Legends list honoring a century of high school basketball.
- Jim Brewer (Proviso East HS) • basketball player and coach • led his team to the 1969 state basketball title before playing for the 1972 Olympic team, and playing and coaching in the NBA.
- Quinn Buckner (Thornridge HS) • basketball player, coach, announcer • led his basketball team to state titles in 1971 and 1972. Played for gold medal 1976 Olympic team after being a part of the 1976 undefeated Indiana team that won the NCAA championship. Later played, coached, and became a broadcaster in the NBA.
- Dave Butz (Maine South HS) • professional football player • won 1968 state championship in the discus.
- David Clayton (Thornridge HS) • activist • won 1972 dramatic interpretation medal and All Star Cast for The Firebugs.
- Bart Conner (Niles West HS) • Olympic gymnast • medaled 13 times between 1973 and 1975, including three State Titles on the parallel bars, and two All-Around State Titles.
- Jimmy Connors (Assumption HS, East St. Louis) • international tennis star • placed fifth at the 1967 State Tennis Championship Tournament.
- Roger Ebert (Urbana HS) • film critic • won 1958 state title in radio speaking (Individual Events).
- Jimmy Evert (Senn High School) • international tennis player and coach • won 1940 boys' tennis state title.
- Neil Flynn (Waukegan East HS) • actor • won 1978 state title in humorous duet acting (Individual Events).
- Red Grange (Wheaton HS) • professional football player • medaled seven times in Track & Field (1920–22) including state championships in the high jump, 100 yard dash, long jump, and 220 yard dash.
- Dawn Harper (East St. Louis Senior HS) • Olympic gold medalist • swept both hurdling events as a high school junior (2000–01) and senior (01–02).
- Dennis Hastert • Congressman and 59th Speaker of the U.S. House of Representatives • Head Wrestling Coach for Yorkville HS who won the 1976 Class A State Wrestling Championship.
- Edwin Hubble (Wheaton HS) • astronomer • won 1906 state championship in the high jump.
- Evan Jager (Jacobs High School) • Olympic silver medalist in steeplechase • won state championships in Cross Country and Track and Field from 2006 to 2007, including 2006 Cross Country individual title, 2006 4 × 800 m and 1600m titles, 2007 3200m title
- Jackie Joyner-Kersee (Lincoln HS, East St. Louis) • Olympic athlete • won five medals from 1978 to 1980, including individual state championships in the 440 yard dash, and long jump (twice).
- Shamier Little (Robert Lindblom Math & Science Academy) - national champion hurdler
- Ralph Metcalfe (Tilden HS) • Olympic athlete and politician • won seven medals from 1927 to 1930.
- Candace Parker (Naperville Central HS) • basketball player • led her team to 2003 and 2004 state titles, winning several national awards.
- Jabari Parker (Simeon Career Academy) • basketball player • led Simeon to four consecutive Class 4A state championships.
- Derrick Rose (Simeon HS) • basketball player • won Class AA basketball state titles in 2006 and 2007.
- Jon Scheyer (Glenbrook North HS) • basketball player • led his team to third place (2003) and a state title (2005).
- Jack Sikma (St. Anne HS) • Hall of Fame basketball player and assistant coach • led his basketball team to a fourth-place finish in Class A.
- Isiah Thomas (St. Joseph HS) • basketball player, coach, executive • led his basketball team to second place in 1978.

== National High School Hall of Fame inductees ==
Twenty-three Illinoisans are members of the National High School Hall of Fame sponsored by the NFHS. The honorees include:

- H. V. Porter (1982) was an IHSA and NFHS administrator who coined the term "March Madness".
- Dwight (Dike) Eddleman (1983) was a three-sport athlete (football, basketball, athletics) at Centralia High School.
- Harold (Red) Grange (1984) was a football player at Wheaton High School.
- Bart Conner (1986) was a gymnast at Niles West High School.
- John L. Griffith (1986) was the first commissioner of the Big Ten Conference, and a contributor to high school athletics.
- Quinn Buckner (1989) was a basketball player at Thornridge High School.
- Gordie Gillespie (1989) was a football coach at Joliet Catholic Academy.
- Jackie Joyner-Kersee (1989) was a track & field athlete at Lincoln High School in East St. Louis.
- Joe Newton (2004) was a cross country coach at York Community High School.

== See also ==
- List of Illinois High School Association member conferences
- National Federation of State High School Associations
- Illinois high school boys basketball championship
- Illinois Elementary School Association
- Menora v. Illinois High School Association

== Notes ==
^{1}The total of 52 counts the high school association of the District of Columbia and the two associations in Iowa, of which the latter has separate governing bodies for boys' and girls' school activities.

^{2}The IHSA sponsors three classes of competitive cheerleading. In addition, there is a fourth class for coed cheerleading teams.

^{3}While boys' golf did not have a team champion until 1938, the IHSA sponsored an individual tournament in 1916, and from 1919 onward.

^{4}Boys' tennis did not have a team champion until 1936, but the IHSA sponsored individual tournaments from 1912 to 1915, and then from 1919 onward.

^{5}The seventeen state titles in Girls Track and Field were won by Lincoln High School in East St. Louis. This school closed after the 1997–98 school year. East St. Louis Senior High School is the caretaker of these records, though the school has not won any state titles in this sport since the merger.

^{6}Football is the only sport to which a team must qualify for entry. 256 teams are accepted based on record, and then opponent wins. These teams are broken into eight groups by size, after which, each team is assigned to one of two 16-team brackets based on geography. Seeding within the bracket is based on record, and then opponent wins.

^{7}Wrestling teams are assigned to a regional by geography. Individual wrestlers are seeded in each weight class. The team regional champion is based on team scores, which are standard for wrestling tournaments, based on individual advancement. The individuals then compete in individual sectionals and an individual state championship. Afterwards, the teams that won their regionals compete in a dual team sectional tournament, with sectional winners advancing to state.

^{8}Music competition is held in a sweepstakes format. Competing schools perform at sites throughout the state. Scores are then submitted from each site to the IHSA, who then rank teams according to the judges scores, with the highest score in each Class being the State Champion. Any school earning a "First Division" distinction in judging, irrelevant of their final placement, may purchase an award. While barred from solo performance, music ensembles are the only IHSA competitions in which junior high or middle school participation is permitted.

^{9}The IHSA stopped recognizing team champions in debate after the 1971–72 school year. Individual competition continues to the present.

^{10}Although Football and Wrestling are boys' sports, girls can play in both of these sports.

== Bibliography ==
- Johnson, Scott, et al. 100 Years of Madness: The Illinois High School Association Boys' Basketball Tournament. (Bloomington: Illinois High School Association, 2007). ISBN 0-9601166-6-4
- Whitten, Charles W. Interscholastics: A Discussion of Interscholastic Contests. (Chicago: Illinois High School Association, 1950).
