= H. V. Porter =

American educator and coach (1891–1975)

- Born: October 2, 1891 near Manito, Illinois, U.S.
- Died: October 27, 1975 (aged 84); St. Petersburg, Florida, U.S.
- Education: Illinois State University; University of Illinois at Urbana–Champaign
- Occupations: athletic administrator, educator
- Basketball career

Career highlights
- Coined the term March Madness; Introduced first molded basketball; Designed the fan-shaped backboard
- Basketball Hall of Fame

Henry Van Arsdale "H. V." Porter (October 2, 1891 – October 27, 1975) was an American educator, coach, and athletic administrator. He served as the executive secretary of the National Federation of State High School Athletic Associations from 1940 to 1958, and prior to his appointment managed several Federation projects while still working for the Illinois High School Athletic Association. Porter was involved with several sports but had special influence on basketball. He served with Oswald Tower on the National Basketball Committee of the United States and Canada for 26 years and was instrumental in the development of the rules films, the fan-shaped backboard, and the molded basketball, which replaced the earlier laced model. He is also credited with popularizing the term "March Madness" through an original essay he wrote in 1939 and a later poem distributed to the various state high school associations and widely republished. In 1960 Porter was inducted into the Naismith Memorial Basketball Hall of Fame in its second class.

== Early life ==
H. V. Porter was born on the family farm in Spring Lake Township in Tazewell County, Illinois, near the town of Manito. After attending Illinois State Normal University, he worked as principal at high schools in Mount Zion, Keithsburg, and Delavan, Illinois. From 1919 to 1927 he served as principal of Athens High School, where he gained statewide renown as a basketball coach. His teams finished second in the Illinois state championship tournament in 1924 and fourth in 1926.

== At the IHSA ==
In 1927 Porter was hired as assistant manager of the Illinois High School Athletic Association, which was headed by C. W. Whitten. His first duties were to organize a department to license and train officials in football, basketball, and baseball, and to serve as editor of a new monthly magazine, the Illinois High School Athlete. He also initiated state tournament competitions in swimming and wrestling.

Porter's career was helped by Whitten's dual role as executive officer of both the IHSAA and the NFHSHAA. As Whitten's right-hand man, he was appointed to several rules committees as a National Federation representative. Porter joined the National Basketball Committee of the United States and Canada in 1932, serving as the chief high school negotiator with the National Collegiate Athletic Association (NCAA), the Amateur Athletic Union (AAU), and other amateur sports organizations. As the committee's secretary and co-editor of the rule book, Porter was at the forefront of the sport's development. In 1931 he began experimenting with motion pictures to develop training material for coaches and officials. In 1934 he was placed in charge of the NFHS effort to develop a molded basketball to replace the expensive sewn models that high school programs could scarcely afford. Porter also spearheaded the development of the fan-shaped backboard that was put into use at the high school level in 1939.

== At the National Federation ==
As Whitten prepared to step down as chief executive of both the IHSAA and NFHS in 1940, Porter, his heir apparent at the state association, chose instead to become the first full-time director of the National Federation. As in his previous job, his first order of business was to launch a monthly journal, the National Press Service, which delivered news to member associations, as well as articles and illustrations intended for republication. During Porter's tenure the Federation grew from 26 state associations to 47, with the University Interscholastic League of Texas the only holdout (it finally joined in 1969). Under Porter the National Federation forged an agreement in 1951 with the two major professional baseball leagues that prohibited them from signing high school baseball players until after their class had graduated. The Federation also lobbied successfully to eliminate a federal tax on admissions to school events that would have cost schools on the order of $10 million a year.

First and foremost Porter was known as a rules expert. For most of his 18 years as executive secretary of the Federation, Porter was the only executive employee and spent much of his time editing the various sport rule books and speaking to various groups about rules. One particular goal of Porter and the Federation was to forge a joint rule code with the NCAA in football, like the one that had long been in effect in basketball. With Porter as editor, the Federation had written its own football code in 1932 after the NCAA rebuffed the Federation's request for representation on the national rules committee. Efforts to resolve differences with the NCAA failed again in 1936, but in 1947 the parties seemed ready to make another attempt. After more than a year of often acrimonious discussions, the two groups agreed to final language in the summer of 1948, only to have the NCAA pull out of the project after the NFHS had already gone to print with its edition of the joint code.

== "March Madness" ==
While he was editor of the IHSAA's magazine, Porter often included some of his own poems and short pieces on athletic topics. Many of these compositions were later published in an independent volume named H.V.'s Athletic Anthology. In 1939, near the end of his run with the IHSAA, he penned an affectionate essay about fans of the state's high school basketball tournament, which had grown significantly in popularity during the 1930s. "When the March madness is on him," Porter wrote, "midnight jaunts of a hundred miles on successive nights make him even more alert the next day."

Two years later, while in his first year at the National Federation of State High School Athletic Associations, Porter wrote a poem entitled "Basketball Ides of March," which he included in the National Press Service, the Federation's monthly journal, with a suggestion to state associations to republish the poem during basketball tournament time. The Tennessee Secondary School Athletic Association was the first to do so, in its March 1941 edition. The Illinois High School Association and the Ohio High School Athletic Association published the poem a year later, in March 1942.

"Basketball Ides of March" ends with the final stanza:

With war nerves tense, the final defense
Is the courage, strength and will
In a million lives where freedom thrives
And liberty lingers still.
Now eagles fly and heroes die
Beneath some foreign arch
Let their sons tread where hate is dead
In a happy Madness of March.

== Personal life ==
H. V. Porter married Grace Kromminga, a school teacher, in 1914. The couple had no children. After Porter's retirement in 1958, they relocated to St. Petersburg, Florida, where Porter died in 1975 at the age of 84. His ashes are inurned in the mausoleum of Memorial Park Cemetery in St. Petersburg.

In 1960 Porter was inducted into the Naismith Memorial Basketball Hall of Fame as a "contributor to basketball." When the National Federation inaugurated its National High School Hall of Fame in 1982, Porter was a posthumous member of its first class.
