= Death on Deadline =

1987 novel by Robert Goldsborough

- Cover of the first edition
- Author: Robert Goldsborough
- Series: Nero Wolfe
- Genre: Detective; Mystery
- Publisher: Bantam Books
- Preceded by: Murder in E Minor
- Followed by: The Bloodied Ivy

Death on Deadline is a Nero Wolfe mystery novel by American writer Robert Goldsborough, first published by Bantam in 1987. It is the second of Goldsborough's seventeen novels featuring Rex Stout's sedentary detective.

== Background ==
Between 1934 and his death in 1975, Rex Stout wrote a series of detective mystery stories starring the protagonist Nero Wolfe. Journalist Robert Goldsborough, a long time fan of the series, had written an unofficial sequel as a Christmas present for his mother. The book impressed the Stout biographer, John McAleer, so much that the Stout estate gave the rights for the book to be officially published, as Murder in E Minor. That book was met with widespread critical acclaim, from fans and critics alike, with it being awarded the 8th annual Nero Award by The Wolfe Pack.

== Plot ==
In Death on Deadline, the current owners of the Gazette are getting old, and a Scottish press baron, Ian MacLaren, is expressing an interest in acquiring the Gazette as part of his quest to own a major paper in the largest city of every English-speaking country (he already has the others). Lon Cohen confides this to Archie at their weekly poker game, and Wolfe becomes concerned on a number of fronts: he likes the newspaper the way it is, he has heard bad things about MacLaren's other newspapers, and his preferred relationship with the press may be threatened (Cohen, in particular, would quit/retire if MacLaren took over).

After sending Archie on a mission to get samples of several of MacLaren's newspapers for more detailed examination, Wolfe becomes alarmed enough to place a full-page advertisement in The New York Times to publicly question whether MacLaren is a suitable owner of the newspaper and to offer assistance to any parties that agree with his point of view.

== Characters, in order of appearance ==
- Nero Wolfe — semi-retired great sedentary legendary detective on the Lower West Side of Manhattan
- Archie — Wolfe's right-hand man, and teller of the Wolfe stories in the first person
- Saul Panzer — Another recurring character in the Wolfe canon, an (implicitly) Jewish operative, top quality, who lives alone in his own apartment and hosts weekly poker games to which Lon Cohen, Archie, and Fred Durkin (qqv below), among others, are invited
- Fred Durkin — Another independent detective Wolfe frequently uses. Not as sharp or as expensive as Panzer, but frequently easier to book on short notice.
- Bill Gore — Yet another freelancer. Gore's character is not developed much in either the Rex Stout or Goldsborough stories, but is another name to insert when one is needed.
- Ian MacLaren — Scottish press baron, lately showing an interest in gaining control of the Gazette at which Lon Cohen is a senior editor. The story begins when the threat of a takeover by MacLaren rattles Lon so that he plays badly at Saul's poker game.
- Gershmann — another Wolfe client, case ongoing when the story opens. Closing that case immediately provides an infusion of cash to the Wolfe operation, which is expensive; see the main Nero Wolfe article for insight on that point. Otherwise Gershmann plays no part in the present case.
- Studs Terkel — not a fictional person but a real author whom the fictional Wolfe likes, and by implication Goldsborough as well. In the present novel, Wolfe is reading Terkel's book The Good War. This book-within-a-book theme is found throughout many of the Wolfe stories, even the shorter ones. For a parallel case in which the book-within-a-book is much more famous than the Wolfe story itself, a good example is Lancelot Hogben's Mathematics for the Million, which provides a vital hint in "The Zero Clue".
- Fritz Brenner — Master chef and cook for the four men living in Wolfe's old brownstone. Functionally he also serves as a foil for Archie to explain his ideas without the high-minded slant favored by Wolfe.
- Harriett Haverhill — largest single shareholder (about 35%) of the Gazette, second wife and now widow of Wilkins Haverhill who bought the paper back in the 1930s, related by marriage to the other major shareholders: David Haverhill (stepson, about 17%), Donna Palmer (divorced stepdaughter now living in Boston, also 17%). Carolyn Haverhill, wife of David, although not a shareholder, is quickly apparent as the sharpest of the younger Haverhills. Finally there is Scott Haverhill, Harriett's step-nephew.
- Elliot Dean — Harriett Haverhill's long-time lawyer, who accompanies Harriett on her visit to Wolfe's office following the Times advertisement, despite advising her against coming and also against her own wishes. Harriet and Elliot are Wolfe's first visitors following his Times advertisement. Dean holds 2–3% of the Gazette's stock.
- Demarest family (owners of the Gazette before Wilkins bought it) and Arlen Publishing — owners of slightly more than 12% of the Gazette
- Inspector Cramer of the Manhattan police.
- Audrey MacLaren — ex-wife of Ian MacLaren, now living in Connecticut, firmly believes Ian caused Harriet's death and engages Wolfe to investigate
- Scott Haverhill — Harriet's step-nephew, owner of 10% of the Gazette. He tells Wolfe that Harriet has offered him the position of Publisher, provided that he sells his 10% of the Gazette to Harriet's trust.
- Carl Bishop — Publisher of the Gazette, holder of 5% of its stock. He plans to retire soon.

== Reception ==
As with the Goldsborough's previous Nero Wolfe book, Murder in E Minor, Death on Deadline was generally received positively. There was a lot of praise for the faithfulness to the original author's works. In a syndicated review, by United Press International, comments were made about its similarity to Stout's writings and that it might even attract new fans. Nicolas Read, of The Vancouver Sun, thought it a rare exception to the general rule of imitation not being as good as the original, with character relationships being recaptured well. Robert Reid, in the Waterloo Region Record, agreed, opining that Goldsborough remained faithful to the "tradition and style" of the characters. Kenneth McGoogan, of the Calgary Herald, concurred that the author came very close to capturing Stout's Voice.

The conclusion of the mystery was also received well, with Nicolas Read calling it good puzzle, with an ending witch stood up to scrutiny, while Robert Reid felt it was a satisfying and entertaining mystery.

Not all reviews were as positive. Bill McLaughlin thought it was a downgrade when compared to Murder in E Minor, with Goldsborough often seeming to try too hard to replicate the series' original mannerisms. All the same he thought the plot was great, with a satisfying, if predictable, conclusion. More critical still was Neil Ewing's review in the Clarion-Ledger, in which he opined that it was inauthentic to the original series and that "the spark of individualism, the essence of Stout, just isn't there." He also felt too much humour had been added to the books.
