= March Madness (disambiguation) =

March Madness usually refers to the NCAA Division I men's basketball tournament; it also refers to:

== Sports ==
- NCAA Division I women's basketball tournament
- NCAA March Madness (TV program), the branding used for television coverage of the men's tournament on CBS, TBS, TNT and TruTV, and the women’s tournament on ABC and the ESPN networks.
- NCAA Basketball series (formerly March Madness series), a video game series
- Mega March Madness, a defunct pay-per-view television package covering the men's tournament
- Illinois High School Boys Basketball Championship, a high-school basketball tournament

== Other uses ==
- "March madness", the main part of the breeding season of the European hare
- "March Madness" (song), by Future, 2015
- March Madness (board game) published in 1991
- March Mammal Madness, a simulated competition among non-human mammals
- March Madness (What We Do in the Shadows), an episode of the TV series What We Do In The Shadows
