= Stabenow =

Stabenow is a surname. Notable people with the surname include:

- Dana Stabenow (born 1952), American author
- Debbie Stabenow (born 1950), American politician
