= A scandal in =

A scandal in may refer to:

- "A Scandal in Belgravia", the first episode of the second series of the BBC crime drama series Sherlock
- A Scandal in Belgravia (book), 1991 book by British author Robert Barnard
- "A Scandal in Bohemia", the first short story, and the third overall work, featuring Arthur Conan Doyle's fictional detective Sherlock Holmes
- "A Scandal in Bohemia" (Sherlock Holmes episode), an episode of the Granada TV Sherlock Holmes adaptations which were produced between 1984 and 1994
- A Scandal in Paris, 1946 American biographical film directed by Douglas Sirk
