= Long Green Line =

2008 high school sports documentary film

- Directed by: Matthew Arnold
- Written by: Matthew Arnold
- Produced by: Brady Hallongren; Matthew Arnold
- Starring: Coach Joe Newton; Lord Sebastian Coe; Matt and Eric Dettman; Conor Chadwick; John Fisher
- Edited by: Alex Saftie
- Music by: Kyle Wittlin
- Production companies: LGL Productions, LLC
- Release date: August 18, 2008
- Running time: 87 minutes
- Country: United States
- Language: English
- Budget: $75,000

The Long Green Line is an independent American feature-length documentary film about the 2005 York Community High School Cross Country team, Elmhurst, Illinois. It is written, directed and co-produced by Matthew Arnold, with co-production and cinematography by Brady Hallongren. The film documents Coach Joe Newton's 50th year coaching, while the team is going for their 25th Illinois (IHSA) state title.

There are over 220 boys on the team, and during the film, two of the top seven runners are arrested, expelled from school, and expelled from the team for arson.

The film was released on August 18, 2008, and ran in theaters for six weeks.

== Reception ==
- Three stars from Chicago Tribune
- Three stars - Chicago SunTimes: ""A healthy reminder of how sports can mold young men and women into better people. "

=== Awards ===
- Endurance Sports Award - Running Film of the Year
- Best Documentary - Lake Forest Film Festival
- Best Documentary - Naperville Film Festival
- Opening Film - Running Film Festival - U.S. Olympic Trials, Eugene Oregon
- Voted #10 Best Sports Film of all time - ESPNrise.com
