= Death by Sheer Torture =

1981 novel by Robert Barnard

- First edition (publ. Collins Crime Club)
- Author: Robert Barnard
- Publisher: Collins Crime Club
- Publication date: January 1, 1981
- ISBN: 978-0-002-31871-6

Death by Sheer Torture (1981), also known simply as Sheer Torture, is a mystery novel by English writer Robert Barnard, the first of five novels, penned in the 1980s, featuring his recurring detective character Perry Trethowan.

== Synopsis ==
Police detective Perry Trethowan suffers a terminal embarrassment when his estranged, aristocratic father is found dead atop a Strappado-style torture device of his own design. Even more humiliating is the revelation that he was wearing spangled tights at the time, exacerbating Perry's fear that he will be mocked about this case for the rest of his life. However, any hopes he may have had of fading quietly into the background are halted when his superiors force him to lead the investigation, and so he soon finds himself in search of a killer amongst the eccentric relatives he thought he had left behind years ago.

== Reception ==
The novel received mostly positive reviews from critics and sold well.

Another of the author's unfailingly entertaining forays into crime. One of the most inventive writers of detective fiction today. – Westlake
