= Fade to Black (novel) =

1990 novel by Robert Goldsborough

- Author: Robert Goldsborough
- Language: English
- Series: Nero Wolfe
- Genre: Mystery Novel
- Publisher: Bantam Books
- Publication date: October 1990
- Publication place: United States
- Media type: Print (Hardback & Paperback)
- ISBN: 0-553-07060-6 (first edition, hardback)
- OCLC: 21376270
- Dewey Decimal: 813/.54 20
- LC Class: PS3557.O3849 F3 1990
- Preceded by: The Last Coincidence
- Followed by: Silver Spire

Fade to Black is a Nero Wolfe mystery novel by Robert Goldsborough, the fifth of seventeen Nero Wolfe books extending the Rex Stout canon. It was first published by Bantam in hardcover in October 1990.

The novel follows Wolfe and Archie Goodwin as they are hired by a small advertising agency to find out who is leaking their secrets to a large and powerful competitor.

== Plot summary ==
Wolfe's right-hand man and amanuensis Archie Goodwin is attending a Super Bowl party thrown by his good friend Lily Rowan at her East Side penthouse in Manhattan. During the game, there is a spectacular commercial involving parachutists, acrobats, and more promoting a cherry-flavored soft drink call Cherr-o-kee. One of the partners of the ad agency that produced the commercial, Rod Mills, is also at the party and takes Goodwin aside to say that he'd like help with a problem.

Later, all three partners of the ad agency, Mills/Lake/Ryman, meet at Wolfe's office to discuss the problem of industrial espionage they've been having lately: their best ideas are being used by a larger agency representing another cherry-flavored soft drink.

Wolfe and Goodwin are tasked with uncovering the identity of the individual leaking confidential information from Mills/Lake/Ryman to a rival. They discover that the executive of the rival drink's campaign is the recipient of the information but he is found dead in his apartment by Archie.

This prompts the owner of Cherr-o-kee, a reclusive part-Cherokee billionaire named Acker Foreman to pay Wolfe a visit, along with his two adult sons, Arnold and Stephen. Wolfe gains Foreman's respect with his knowledge of his career and of Cherokee history, especially the Trail of Tears. Arnold, however, displays the same hostility as he has to Mills/Lake/Ryman personnel.

After further investigation, Wolfe gathers the interested parties at his brownstone to lay out his proposed solution, this time without enough evidence to please law enforcement. However, since his mandate is simply to stop industrial espionage, he can (arguably) collect his fee.

== Characters ==
- Nero Wolfe – the detective, protagonist
- Archie Goodwin – Wolfe's right-hand man
- Lily Rowan – who throws the party which Archie and Mills attend
- Rod Mills – a partner in the ad agency
- Boyd Lake – a partner in the ad agency
- Sara Ryman – a partner in the ad agency
- Acker Foreman – a reclusive part-Cherokee billionaire
- Arnold and Stephen Foreman – his sons

== Reception ==
Publishers Weekly described the novel as a "flat and not very mysterious tale" which "lacks drama and suspense"

== Publication history ==
- 1990, USA, Bantam Books ISBN 0-553-07060-6, October 1990, hardback (First edition)
- 1991, USA, Bantam Books ISBN 0-553-29264-1, September 1991, paperback
