= Murder in E Minor =

Book by Robert Goldsborough

- First edition
- Author: Robert Goldsborough
- Language: English
- Series: Nero Wolfe
- Genre: Detective, Mystery novel
- Publisher: Bantam Books
- Publication date: 1 March 1986
- Publication place: United States
- Media type: Print (hardback & paperback)
- Pages: 196 pp (first edition hardcover)
- ISBN: 0-553-05123-7 (first edition hardcover)
- OCLC: 12942210
- Dewey Decimal: 813/.54 19
- LC Class: PS3557.O3849 M8 1986
- Followed by: Death on Deadline

Murder in E Minor is a 1986 Nero Wolfe novel written by Robert Goldsborough. The action takes place in New York City, primarily New York County, better known as Manhattan.

Goldsborough's first Wolfe novel extends a long string of Rex Stout Nero Wolfe stories (both novels and shorter novella-length stories) stretching back 40 years. Goldsborough has adopted Stout's premises very closely and received a Nero Award from The Wolfe Pack for his effort. Characterization is generally successful as Goldsborough's characters are primarily defined by Rex Stout's ideas.

== Plot summary ==
The final Wolfe book written by Stout, A Family Affair, ends with the disgrace and suicide of one of the Wolfe team. As the new book opens, Wolfe has been in a state of virtual retirement for a while, although a good word from Inspector Cramer has allowed them to remain licensed private investigators in good standing, although inactive.

Several of Stout's Wolfe novels made it clear that Wolfe was Montenegrin, and had once been involved in what would today be called terrorist activities against the oppressors of his homeland (in early days of the 20th century, those would be the Austro-Hungarian Empire). Hard as it is to see in the present-day corpulent agoraphobic crime-solving genius in Manhattan, he was once a man of action in Montenegro and the surrounding area. A few of his comrades from that era also survive: the present conductor of the New York Symphony Orchestra, Milan Stevans (name now anglicized from Milos Stefanović), and Milan's long-estranged wife, Alexandra Adjari, now living in London. Stevans became the guardian of his great-niece Maria Radovich after the death of her parents.

The niece appeals to Wolfe to help her solve a problem. Her great-uncle has been receiving threatening notes. He has thrown them away, but she recovered them and has brought them to Wolfe. Since Wolfe is semi-retired, she gives Archie an ancient photograph showing her uncle, Wolfe, and other comrades. Although Maria's uncle saved Wolfe's life in a shootout at Cetinje fifty years earlier, a love triangle also developed between Wolfe, Milos, and Alexandra, with the result that Wolfe and Stefanović have had no contact for many years even though they have been living in the same borough for the past few years. Therefore, it is up to Maria to seek help. Archie slides the photo into the stack of morning mail and is gratified at Wolfe's reaction when he finds it. Wolfe sees Maria and undertakes to try to help, but is skeptical of what he can accomplish without her uncle's cooperation. Furthermore, Maria's own cooperation is cast into doubt as it is clear that she is shielding a person she suspects of having sent the notes. It soon develops that there is conflict between her uncle and Gerald (Jerry) Milner, a young violinist with the orchestra who wants to marry Maria. Wolfe feels honor-bound to accept Maria as a token client because of Milos' action in Cetinje despite the rancor that developed in later years.

Wolfe invites long-time press friend/collaborator Lon Cohen from the fictional New York Gazette over for dinner (prepared as always by Fritz Brenner) and serves Cohen's favorite brandy. From Lon, Wolfe learns that in recent years, the New York Symphony has had more than its share of troubles. An idea formed in the mind of the Gazette's music critic and others that the Orchestra had faltered under the previous two music directors. Milan had been brought in to revive the fortunes of the orchestra, but the ultimate result was strife with the players and other members of upper management. Soon, Milan is killed, and Jerry Milner becomes the prime suspect.

After this point, the plot explores the characters in the symphony orchestra, from its chairman (who owns the company that makes Wolfe's favorite beer), other musicians who came into conflict with Stevens, and other people connected with the orchestra.
