= Nero Award =

American literary award

The Nero Award is a literary award for excellence in the mystery genre presented by The Wolfe Pack, a society founded in 1978 to explore and celebrate the Nero Wolfe stories of Rex Stout. The Nero Award is presented annually at the Black Orchid Banquet, traditionally held on the first Saturday in December in New York City.

== Winners ==
Year	Title	Author	Reference
1979	The Burglar Who Liked to Quote Kipling	Lawrence Block	
1980	Burn This	Helen McCloy	
1981	Death in a Tenured Position	Amanda Cross	
1982	Past, Present and Murder	Hugh Pentecost	
1983	The Anodyne Necklace	Martha Grimes	
1984	Emily Dickinson is Dead	Jane Langton	
1985	Sleeping Dog	Dick Lochte	
1986	Murder in E Minor	Robert Goldsborough	
1987	The Corpse in Oozak’s Pond	Charlotte MacLeod	
1988 1989 1990	no award presented		
1991	Coyote Waits	Tony Hillerman	
1992	A Scandal in Belgravia	Robert Barnard	
1993	Booked to Die	John Dunning	
1994	Old Scores	Aaron Elkins	
1995	She Walks These Hills	Sharyn McCrumb	
1996	A Monstrous Regiment of Women	Laurie R. King	
1997	The Poet	Michael Connelly	
1998	Sacred	Dennis Lehane	
1999	The Bone Collector	Jeffery Deaver	
2000	Coyote Revenge	Fred Harris	
2001	Sugar House	Laura Lippman	
2002	The Deadhouse	Linda Fairstein	
2003	Winter and Night	S. J. Rozan	
2004	Fear Itself	Walter Mosley	
2005	The Enemy	Lee Child	
2006	Vanish	Tess Gerritsen	
2007	All Mortal Flesh	Julia Spencer-Fleming	
2008	Anatomy of Fear	Jonathan Santlofer	
2009	The Tenth Case	Joseph Teller	
2010	Faces of the Gone	Brad Parks	
2011	Bury Your Dead	Louise Penny	
2012	Though Not Dead	Dana Stabenow	
2013	Dead Anyway	Chris Knopf	
2014	Murder as a Fine Art	David Morrell	
2015	Peter Pan Must Die	John Verdon	
2016	Night Life	David C. Taylor	
2017	With Six You Get Wally	Al Lamanda	
2018	August Snow	Stephen Mack Jones	
2019	Down the River unto the Sea	Walter Mosley	
2020	One Good Deed	David Baldacci	
2021	Fortune Favors the Dead	Stephen Spotswood	
2022	Tower of Babel	Michael Sears	
2023	The Day He Left	Frederick Weisel	
2024	The Frozen River	Ariel Lawhon	
2025	Agony Hill	Sarah Stewart Taylor	
