= Laszlo's Father =

- What We Do in the Shadows episode
- Episode no.: Season 6 Episode 6
- Directed by: Yana Gorskaya
- Written by: Jake Bender; Zach Dunn
- Cinematography by: Bevan Crothers
- Editing by: Liza Cardinale; Matthew Freund; Yana Gorskaya; Dane McMaster
- Production code: XWS06006
- Original air date: November 11, 2024
- Running time: 26 minutes

Guest appearances
- Steve Coogan as Lord Roderick Cravensworth; Andy Assaf as Cravensworth's Monster; Taylor Ortega as Airbnb Owner

Episode chronology
← Previous "Nandor's Army"	Next → "March Madness"

"Laszlo's Father" is the sixth episode of the sixth season of the American mockumentary comedy horror television series What We Do in the Shadows, set in the franchise of the same name. It is the 56th overall episode of the series and was written by supervising producers Jake Bender and Zach Dunn, and directed by executive producer Yana Gorskaya. It was released on FX on November 11, 2024.

The series is set in Staten Island, New York City. Like the 2014 film, the series follows the lives of vampires in the city. These consist of three vampires, Nandor, Laszlo, and Nadja. They live alongside Colin Robinson, an energy vampire; and Guillermo, Nandor's familiar. The series explores the absurdity and misfortunes experienced by the vampires. In the episode, Laszlo is annoyed when his father returns as a spirit from the afterlife, while Nadja and Nandor believe their neighbors might be shapeshifters.

According to Nielsen Media Research, the episode was seen by an estimated 0.187 million household viewers and gained a 0.05 ratings share among adults aged 18–49. The episode received critical acclaim, with praise towards the special effects and Coogan's guest appearance.

== Plot ==
Nandor (Kayvan Novak) and Nadja (Natasia Demetriou) spend their time spying on their new neighbors through a telescope. They are confused that the house has different residents from time to time and fear that they might be shapeshifters, unaware that the real reason is that it is an Airbnb.

Laszlo (Matt Berry) is disturbed by strange events in the house, and asks Nadja to help him summon the spirit responsible. The spirit is revealed to be none other than Lord Roderick Cravensworth (Steve Coogan), Laszlo's very own father. Roderick hopes to patch things up with Laszlo, but he is rejected by him. While the vampires are charmed by Roderick, Laszlo warns that his father cannot be trusted, as Laszlo was constantly humiliated by him when he was alive. Colin Robinson (Mark Proksch) is delighted that Roderick takes an interest in his Funko collection, but Laszlo intends to get rid of his father, with his spirit catcher, a device which he claims to be of his own invention, but which suspiciously resembles a proton pack from Ghostbusters II. Eventually, Laszlo decides to give Roderick a second chance in his life, after seeing how his father forms a bond with Colin Robinson, and begins to believe he truly has changed.

Laszlo finds Roderick in his laboratory, but also discovers that he has the Book of Souls in his possession. He concludes that Roderick only returned to find a specific spell, which would allow him to possess Cravensworth's Monster as a vessel. Roderick confesses to this, admitting that he hates his time in the afterlife. Laszlo remonstrates his father for constantly humiliating him, and also for killing Laszlo's mother. Then Roderick reveals that it is not the Monster that he plans to possess after all, but rather Laszlo himself. He starts chanting the spell, which knocks Laszlo to the ground, unable to reach his spirit catcher. Just in time, the Monster releases itself from its bonds, and manages to pass the spirit catcher to Laszlo. Laszlo fires up the spirit catcher, sucking up his father's spirit and trapping it in a glowing blue trap, resembling an hourglass.

Meanwhile, Nandor sends Nadja to sneak into the Airbnb to find evidence of the shapeshifters. When the guests arrive back early, Nadja destroys a window to flee to safety. Later on, the homeowner (Taylor Ortega) turns up to confront Guillermo (Harvey Guillén), Nadja and Nandor about the destruction to her property. However, during conversation, it is revealed that their neighbor's house isn't zoned for an Airbnb, and that she is illegally operating one. To buy their silence, she allows Guillermo, Nadja and Nandor to stay rent-free for one weekend every month. As the three enjoy their stay, they fail to see that the owner actually really is a shapeshifter, as she transforms into an opossum, when she is leaving the house. When Colin Robinson arrives back home with a Funko of Roderick, Laszlo lies to him by stating that Roderick left on a "ghost mission". Furthermore he states that Roderick really liked Colin Robinson, and in fact, left Colin Robinson a gift, which is what Laszlo claims the hourglass trap is. Colin Robinson takes the glowing blue hourglass trap and locks it away with his Funko collection in his vault.

== Production ==
=== Development ===
In October 2024, FX confirmed that the sixth episode of the season would be titled "Laszlo's Father", and that it would be written by supervising producers Jake Bender and Zach Dunn, and directed by executive producer Yana Gorskaya. This was Bender's seventh writing credit, Dunn's seventh writing credit, and Gorskaya's 20th directing credit.

=== Casting ===
In October 2024, Steve Coogan was confirmed to guest star as Laszlo's father, reuniting him with Matt Berry, who previously appeared in his sitcom series Saxondale.

== Reception ==
=== Viewers ===
In its original American broadcast, "Laszlo's Father" was seen by an estimated 0.187 million household viewers with a 0.05 in the 18-49 demographics. This means that 0.05 percent of all households with televisions watched the episode. This was a slight increase in viewership from the previous episode, which was watched by 0.183 million household viewers with a 0.02 in the 18-49 demographics.

=== Critical reviews ===
"Laszlo's Father" received critical acclaim. William Hughes of The A.V. Club gave the episode an "A" grade and wrote, "“Laszlo's Father” had me excited when it was first announced simply from the name alone. And it didn't disappoint. It's a superbly balanced half-hour, the Nadja-Nandor plot-line getting just enough air, and just enough brush-up with Roderick's charm, to give breaks from the Cravensworth family drama. But the episode also knows where the really juicy stuff is, deploying Coogan's guest-star power in a way that complements, instead of overwhelms, the show. With just five episodes left in the series, it's the kind of offering that makes me even sadder to see it leave — but also confident that the people running things to know how to go out on the highest of notes."

Katie Rife of Vulture gave the episode a 3 star rating out of 5 and wrote, "After the major disruptions and heart-to-heart conversations of the past two weeks, episode six is something of a pause for What We Do in the Shadows's final season, indulging in silly stand-alone antics that only nod to the current dynamics of the vampire household."

Noel Murray of Episodic Medium wrote, "this has never really been an effects-heavy show, but I've still always enjoyed (and praised!) the ways that the sudden transformations, flights and super-speed are handled so matter-of-factly, often passing by in an eye-blink. This week though, we get a special effect that stays on-screen for most of the episode: Lord Roderick Cravensworth, Laszlo's late father, appears in the Residence as a charming specter, bathed in a crackling blue light. He's also played by Steve Coogan, who — while not an effect — is still pretty special." Melody McCune of Telltale TV gave the episode a 3.5 star rating out of 5, and wrote the episode "tackles shapeshifters and ghosts as Laszlo reunites with his long-dead dad, played by the hilarious Steve Coogan. The episode isn't quite as strong as last week's outing, but there's still plenty to love, especially the brilliant Matt Berry."
