= Vermont Principals' Association =

American educational organization

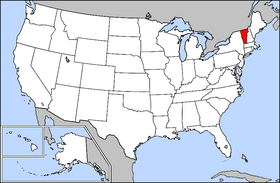
- Abbreviation: VPA
- Formation: 1945
- Legal status: Association
- Purpose: Athletic/Educational
- Headquarters: 2 Prospect St. Suite 3 Montpelier, VT 05602
- Region served: Vermont
- Members: 300+ schools
- Executive Director: Robert Stevens
- Affiliations: National Federation of State High School Associations
- Staff: 6
- Website: vpaonline.org
- Remarks: (802) 229-0547

The Vermont Principals' Association (VPA) is an organization of over 300 schools in the U.S. state of Vermont that sponsor activities in numerous sports and activities. The VPA is a member of the National Federation of State High School Associations (NFHS), which writes the rules for most U.S. high school sports and activities.

== Sponsored activities ==
- Alpine Skiing
- Baseball
- Basketball
- Bowling
- Cheerleading
- Cross Country
- Dance
- Field Hockey
- Football
- Golf
- Gymnastics
- Ice Hockey
- Indoor Track
- Lacrosse
- Nordic Skiing
- Outdoor Track
- Snowboarding
- Soccer
- Softball
- Tennis
- Ultimate (First state in the USA to organize)
- Wrestling
- Volleyball (Last state in the USA to organize)

=== Other activities ===
- Debate/Forensics
- Drama
- Geography
- Math
- Science
- Spelling
- Student Council
- Student Leadership
- Youth for Justice

== Ban and lawsuit ==
In 2023 the organization banned a Christian school from competing in events it organized after the school forfeited a game against a team with a trans athlete. A lawsuit followed and was settled in 2026 with a six figure payment to the school.
