= Robert Goldsborough (writer) =

Journalist and mystery writer

- Born: Robert Gerald Goldsborough; October 3, 1937 (age 89); Chicago, Illinois, U.S.
- Education: York Community High School; Medill School of Journalism
- Occupations: Writer, journalist
- Spouse: Janet Elizabeth Moore (m. 1966)
- Writing career
- Genre: Detective fiction
- Website: robertgoldsborough.com

Robert Gerald Goldsborough (born October 3, 1937, in Chicago, Illinois) is an American journalist and writer of mystery novels. He worked for 45 years for the Chicago Tribune and Advertising Age, but gained prominence as the author of a series of 17 authorized pastiches of Rex Stout's Nero Wolfe detective stories, published from 1986 to 1994 and from 2012 to 2025. The first novel, Murder in E Minor (1986), received a Nero Award.

In 2005, Goldsborough published Three Strikes You're Dead, the first novel of a five-book series of period mysteries featuring Chicago Tribune reporter Steve (Snap) Malek.

== Biography ==
Robert Goldsborough was born October 3, 1937, in Chicago, the son of architect Robert Vincent Goldsborough and Wilma (Janak) Goldsborough. He grew up in Elmhurst, Illinois, and graduated from York Community High School before attending Northwestern University, where he earned a bachelor's and a master's degree (1959, 1960) from the Medill School of Journalism.

=== Journalism ===
After a year of reporting for the Associated Press, Goldsborough went to work for the Chicago Tribune as a reporter (1960–1963). From 1963 to 1966, he served as assistant editor of the newspaper's Sunday magazine and TV Week, which he edited from 1966 to 1967. He was assistant to the features editor (1967–1971) and editor (1971–1972), and was named Sunday editor (1972–1975) and editor of the Sunday magazine (1975–1982). In 1982, he joined Advertising Age as editor and became the magazine's special projects director in 1988. He retired in December 2004.

=== Nero Wolfe ===
Goldsborough gained national renown in the 1980s with the publication — approved by the estate of Rex Stout — of his Nero Wolfe mystery Murder in E Minor (1986). Written privately for his mother back in 1978, shortly after the death of Stout (creator of the Nero Wolfe mysteries), Goldsborough's novel received a Nero Award. Seventeen other Nero Wolfe books by Goldsborough followed, including Archie Goes Home (2020).

"As the one who extended the life of Rex’s Stout’s famed private eye Nero Wolfe with seven novels in the 1980s and ’90s, I got both praise and derision — praise from readers who were glad to have more tales of Wolfe and his loyal right-hand, Archie Goodwin, and derision from those who either lamented that 'you haven’t got it right' or who felt fictional characters should be allowed to die with their creators," Goldsborough wrote in 2011.

Goldsborough resumed his Nero Wolfe series with Archie Meets Nero Wolfe (2012), a prequel to Stout's novels, followed by Murder in the Ball Park (2014). His latest effort, The White Mountain, was published in 2025.

=== Snap Malek ===
In 2005, Goldsborough turned his attention to creating books with his own characters, beginning with Three Strikes You're Dead, a mystery set in pre-war Chicago, featuring Steve (Snap) Malek, a reporter for the Chicago Tribune. In February 2006, Three Strikes You're Dead was named Best Historical Mystery at the eighth annual Love is Murder awards banquet. Terror at the Fair (2011), the fifth book in the Snap Malek series, received the Lovey Award in 2012.

== Bibliography ==
=== Nero Wolfe novels ===
1. Murder in E Minor. New York: Bantam Books. April 1986. ISBN 0-553-05123-7.
2. Death on Deadline. Bantam Books. May 1987. ISBN 0-553-05193-8.
3. The Bloodied Ivy. Bantam Books. August 1988. ISBN 0-553-05281-0.
4. The Last Coincidence. Bantam Books. December 1989. ISBN 0-553-05383-3.
5. Fade to Black. Bantam Books. November 1990. ISBN 0-553-07060-6.
6. Silver Spire. Bantam Books. November 1992. ISBN 0-553-07237-4.
7. The Missing Chapter. Bantam Books. January 1994. ISBN 0-553-07241-2.
8. Archie Meets Nero Wolfe. MysteriousPress.com/Open Road. November 2012. ISBN 978-1-453-27097-4.
9. Murder in the Ball Park. MysteriousPress.com/Open Road. January 2014.
10. Archie in the Crosshairs. MysteriousPress.com/Open Road. March 2015. ISBN 978-1-497-69041-7.
11. Stop the Presses!. MysteriousPress.com/Open Road. March 2016. ISBN 978-1504023573.
12. Murder, Stage Left. MysteriousPress.com/Open Road. March 2017. ISBN 978-1504041119.
13. The Battered Badge. MysteriousPress.com/Open Road. April 2018. ISBN 978-1504049108.
14. Death of an Art Collector. MysteriousPress.com/Open Road. May 2019. ISBN 978-1504057547.
15. Archie Goes Home. MysteriousPress.com/Open Road. May 2020. ISBN 978-1504059886.
16. Trouble at the Brownstone. MysteriousPress.com/Open Road. June 2021. ISBN 978-1504066624.
17. The Missing Heiress. MysteriousPress.com/Open Road. June 2023.
18. The White Mountain. MysteriousPress.com/Open Road. September 2025. ISBN 979-8337201894.

=== Snap Malek novels ===
1. Three Strikes You're Dead. Laurel, Maryland: Echelon Press. 2005. ISBN 1-59080-424-4.
2. Shadow of the Bomb. Laurel, Maryland: Echelon Press. 2006. ISBN 978-1-59080-351-6.
3. A Death in Pilsen. Laurel, Maryland: Echelon Press. 2007. ISBN 978-1-59080-531-2.
4. A President in Peril. Laurel, Maryland: Echelon Press. 2009. ISBN 978-1-59080-616-6.
5. Terror at the Fair. Laurel, Maryland: Echelon Press. 2011. ISBN 978-1-59080-672-2.

=== Non-fiction ===
1. Great Railroad Paintings. Peacock Press/Bantam. 1976. ISBN 978-0-55301-048-0.

== Awards ==
- 1986: Murder in E Minor, the first of Robert Goldsborough's continuations of Rex Stout's Nero Wolfe series, received a Nero Award from The Wolfe Pack.
- 2006: Three Strikes You're Dead, the first book in the Snap Malek mystery series, received the Love is Murder Readers Choice Award for Best Historical Mystery.
- 2012: Terror at the Fair, the fifth book in the Snap Malek series, received the Lovey Award for Best Historical Novel at the 2012 Love is Murder Mystery Conference.
