= Carolyn Gold Heilbrun =

American writer and professor

Carolyn Heilbrun
- Born: Carolyn Gold; January 13, 1926; East Orange, New Jersey, U.S.
- Died: October 9, 2003 (aged 77); New York City, U.S.
- Education: Wellesley College (BA); Columbia University (MA, PhD)
- Occupations: Writer, professor
- Spouse: James Heilbrun
- Children: 3
- Writing career
- Pen name: Amanda Cross

Carolyn Heilbrun (née Gold; January 13, 1926 – October 9, 2003) was an American academic at Columbia University, the first woman to receive tenure in the English department, and a prolific feminist author of academic studies. In addition, beginning in the 1960s, she published numerous popular mystery novels, under the pen name of Amanda Cross. These have been translated into numerous languages and in total sold nearly one million copies worldwide.

== Early life and education ==
Heilbrun was born in East Orange, New Jersey, to Archibald Gold and Estelle (Roemer) Gold. The family moved to Manhattan's Upper West Side when she was a child. She graduated from Wellesley College in 1947 with a major in English. Afterward, she studied English literature at Columbia University, receiving her M.A. in 1951 and Ph.D. in 1959. Among her most important mentors were Columbia professors Jacques Barzun and Lionel Trilling, while Clifton Fadiman was an important inspiration: She wrote about these three in her final non-fiction work, When Men Were the Only Models We Had: My Teachers Barzun, Fadiman, Trilling (2002).

== Career ==
Heilbrun taught English at Columbia for more than three decades, from 1960 to 1992. She was the first woman to receive tenure in the English Department and held an endowed position. Her academic specialty was British modern literature, with a particular interest in the Bloomsbury Group. Her academic books include the feminist study Writing a Woman's Life (1988). In 1983, she co-founded and became co-editor of the Columbia University Press's Gender and Culture Series with literary scholar Nancy K. Miller. From 1985 until her retirement in 1992, she was Avalon Foundation Professor in the Humanities at Columbia.

=== Kate Fansler mystery novels ===
Heilbrun was the author of 15 Kate Fansler mysteries, published under the pen name of Amanda Cross. Her protagonist Kate Fansler, like Heilbrun, was an English professor. In 1965, the first novel in the series was shortlisted for the Edgar Award in the category of Best First novel.

Heilbrun kept her second career as a mystery novelist secret in order to protect her academic career, until a fan discovered the true identity of "Amanda Cross" through copyright records. Through her novels, all set in academia, Heilbrun explored issues in feminism, academic politics, women's friendships, and other social and political themes. Death in a Tenured Position (1981, set at Harvard University) was particularly harsh in its criticism of the academic establishment's treatment of women. Heilbrun, according to Kimberly Maslin, "reconceptualizes the role of the detective and the nature of crime and its resolution." Her books were translated into "Japanese, German, French, Swedish, Finnish, Spanish and Italian, selling in total nearly a million copies worldwide."

== Personal life ==
She married James Heilbrun, whom she met in college. He was an economist, and they had three children.

== Later life and death ==
Heilbrun enjoyed solitude when working and often spent time alone at various retreats over the years, including her luxury Manhattan apartment and a country home in upstate New York. She also had a Summer house in Alford, Massachusetts. At the age of 68, she purchased a new home to use by herself, as she wanted a private place. She held strong opinions on nearly every aspect of women's lives and also believed that ending one's own life was a basic human right. In keeping with her views on aging in The Last Gift of Time: Life Beyond Sixty, she quit wearing high heels, hose, and form-fitting clothing in her early 60s. She adopted blouses and slacks as her daily attire. Heilbrun's son recalled, "My mother was a generous hostess when she was young, but lost interest in dinner parties as she got older. She preferred to order groceries from the local supermarket and have them sent to her apartment as she was too busy to waste time squeezing oranges at Fairway."

In the book The Last Gift of Time: Life Beyond Sixty, Heilbrun expressed her desire to take her own life on her 70th birthday because "there is no joy in life past that point, only to experience the miserable endgame." She turned 70 in January 1996 and did not follow up on her idea at the time. She lived another seven years.

One fall morning in 2003, she went for a walk around New York City with her longtime friend Mary Ann Caws and told the latter: "I feel sad." When Caws inquired why, Heilbrun responded, "The universe." Afterward, she went home to her apartment. The next morning she was found dead, having taken sleeping pills and placed a plastic bag over her head. She left a suicide note, which read: "The journey is over. Love to all." She was 77 years old. According to her son, she had been in good health with no known physical or mental ailments, and she felt her life was "completed".

== Awards and honors ==
Heilbrun received the Guggenheim Fellowship in 1966 and 1970, a Bunting Institute Fellowship in 1976, and a Rockefeller Fellowship in 1976. She was a National Endowment for the Humanities Senior Research Fellow in 1983. Heilbrun served as a member of the executive council of the Modern Language Association from 1976 to 1979, and was the president in 1984.

== Controversies ==
Heilbrun was the subject of a 1992 New York Times Magazine profile by Anne Matthews wherein she accused the Columbia English Department of discriminating against women. Former Dean of Columbia College Carl Hovde admitted that there was widespread past discrimination against women at Columbia "and all other universities," but dismissed Matthews's accusations of current discriminations in an angry letter to the editor as "rubbish." Nonetheless, Heilbrun was very specific in her memories of being a celebrated female professor at Columbia. "When I spoke up for women's issues, I was made to feel unwelcome in my own department, kept off crucial committees, ridiculed, ignored," Heilbrun told the New York Times. "Ironically, my name in the catalogue gave Columbia a reputation for encouraging feminist studies in modernism. Nothing could be further from the truth."

== Bibliography ==
=== Academic publications ===
Heilbrun, as a scholar wrote or edited 14 nonfiction books, including the feminist study Writing a Woman's Life (1988). These books include:

- The Garnett Family, Macmillan, 1961. A study of the Garnetts, a British family whose many members were devoted to the study and writing of books.
- Christopher Isherwood, Columbia University Press, 1970. Brief analysis of Isherwood's works, which she divides into "novels" and "documentaries."
- Toward a Recognition of Androgyny, Alfred A. Knopf, 1973. Reviewing the book for the New York Times Joyce Carol Oates wrote that "to Carolyn Heilbrun (a professor of English at Columbia) the very salvation of our species depends upon our 'recognition of androgyny’ as a conscious ideal."
- Lady Ottoline's Album, editor. Alfred A. Knopf, 1976. Photographs, taken primarily by Morrell, of her contemporaries in Great Britain.
- Reinventing Womanhood, Norton, 1979. An investigation of women's identity and autonomy in the world. The author of a review of this work published in the Kirkus Reviews wrote that Heilbrun "moving with conviction from autobiography to literary analysis, Oedipal theory, and studies of family patterns among "achieving" females, ...tries to suggest ways in which women can claim supposedly male attitudes and roles as their birthright."
- The Representation of Women in Fiction, co-editor. Johns Hopkins University Press, 1983
- Writing a Woman's Life, Ballantine, 1988
- Hamlet's Mother and Other Women, Columbia University Press, 1990. A collection of essays exploring feminism in literary studies.
- Education of a Woman: The Life of Gloria Steinem, The Dial Press, 1995. Biography.
- The Last Gift of Time: Life Beyond Sixty, Ballantine Books, 1998. Collected essays reflecting on the challenges and rewards of aging.
- When Men Were the Only Models We Had: My Teachers Barzun, Fadiman, Trilling, University of Pennsylvania Press, 2002. A memoir recounting Heilbrun's relationships with her mentors Jacques Barzun, Clifton Fadiman, and Lionel Trilling.

=== Kate Fansler Mysteries ===
- In The Last Analysis (1964)
- The James Joyce Murder (1967)
- Poetic Justice (1970)
- The Theban Mysteries (1971)
- The Question of Max (1976)
- Death in a Tenured Position (1981, Nero Award winner)
- Sweet Death, Kind Death (1984)
- No Word From Winifred (1986)
- A Trap for Fools (1989)
- The Players Come Again (1990)
- An Imperfect Spy (1995)
- The Collected Stories (1997) most are for Kate Fansler
- The Puzzled Heart (1998)
- Honest Doubt (2000)
- The Edge of Doom (2002)
