= P.I. Undercover: New York =

- What We Do in the Shadows episode
- Episode no.: Season 6 Episode 8
- Directed by: Kyle Newacheck
- Written by: Max Brockman
- Cinematography by: Michael Storey
- Editing by: Hannah Anaya; Thomas Calderón; Matthew Freund
- Production code: XWS06008
- Original air date: November 25, 2024
- Running time: 24 minutes

Guest appearances
- Anthony Atamanuik as Sean Rinaldi; Zach Woods as Joel; Kevin Pollak as Cal Bodian; Andy Assaf as Cravensworth's Monster; Kim Quindlen as Becky

Episode chronology
← Previous "March Madness"	Next → "Come Out and Play"

"P.I. Undercover: New York" is the eighth episode of the sixth season of the American mockumentary comedy horror television series What We Do in the Shadows, set in the franchise of the same name. It is the 58th overall episode of the series and was written by supervising producer Max Brockman, and directed by executive producer Kyle Newacheck. It was released on FX on November 25, 2024.

The series is set in Staten Island, New York City. Like the 2014 film, the series follows the lives of vampires in the city. These consist of three vampires, Nandor, Laszlo, and Nadja. They live alongside Colin Robinson, an energy vampire; and Guillermo, Nandor's familiar. The series explores the absurdity and misfortunes experienced by the vampires. In the episode, Colin Robinson and Nadja visit an old friend of Colin Robinson, while Laszlo and Nandor interrupt filming of a police procedural on their street.

According to Nielsen Media Research, the episode was seen by an estimated 0.178 million household viewers and gained a 0.03 ratings share among adults aged 18–49. The episode received mostly positive reviews from critics, who praised the subplot revolving around Colin Robinson and Nadja, while the police procedural subplot attracted a mixed response.

== Plot ==
Walking home, Nandor (Kayvan Novak) finds a crew filming near the house. After attacking a crew member, he enters the house to warn the other vampires. Colin Robinson (Mark Proksch) explains that the crew is filming a TV show titled P.I. Undercover: New York, a police procedural. Problems arise when a crew truck destroys a section of the backyard, leading Nandor and Laszlo (Matt Berry) to declare war on the crew.

Colin Robinson prepares to leave for a meeting with his friend Joel (Zach Woods), a co-worker from his office days and one of the few people he never drained. Nadja (Natasia Demetriou) is curious and eager to practice her human small talk, so Colin Robinson allows her to accompany him. At Joel's house, Nadja poses as Colin Robinson's girlfriend, where they are greeted by Joel and his wife Becky. Colin Robinson fails in making a connection with Joel, after finding out that he has lost interest in baseball, so he goes to the bathroom to find information about Top Chef instead. Meanwhile, Nadja notes that Becky's marriage feels lifeless and that she is actually in love with Colin Robinson.

Nandor and Laszlo ask Guillermo (Harvey Guillén) for help, but he is very excited to check the production as he loves the show, hoping to meet the star, Cal Bodian (Kevin Pollak). Nandor prepares to attack the director in his trailer, but instead finds the second assistant director, who makes him a production assistant. Nandor begins to work extensively on the show, even procuring an exclusive crew sweatshirt, which makes Laszlo jealous. Laszlo vows to get himself his very own sweated shirt, but they are only for the crew. Joel and Becky start arguing during the visit. While Nadja and Becky leave the room, Joel privately asks Colin Robinson to have sex with Becky, hoping this might save his marriage. Uncomfortable with the situation, Colin Robinson and Nadja leave.

Laszlo enters a trailer and steals some of the clothing. When Nandor catches him, they get into a fight over the sweated shirt. Eventually, they patch things up and conclude that they need to kill everyone in the crew. However, they find that filming wrapped 30 minutes ago and everyone left already. They celebrate, believing that not acting was their strategy. Guillermo tries to get Bodian to take a photograph with him, but he refuses. Nandor and Laszlo fail to hypnotize him and attack him, deciding to leave the sweated shirt and cap to Guillermo. Later, Guillermo watches the episode on his laptop, but is surprised when he sees that the crew left the shot where Nandor wandered on set.

== Production ==
=== Development ===
In October 2024, FX confirmed that the eighth episode of the season would be titled "P.I. Undercover: New York", and that it would be written by supervising producer Max Brockman, and directed by executive producer Kyle Newacheck. This was Brockman's second writing credit, and Newacheck's 19th directing credit.

=== Writing ===
Kyle Newacheck, who directs the episode and also appears as the fictional director, said that it was "a brain tickler to execute" something so meta that "puts a film set inside of our film set," adding the series' mockumentary aspects as a complication.

=== Casting ===
In October 2024, it was reported that Zach Woods would guest star in the season. Woods and Mark Proksch worked together in The Office, and the episode includes lines referring to it. Proksch said, "oddly enough, it felt like like we just fell back into old patterns from The Office, which was really fun. That episode isn’t so reliant on big effects or vampire lore. And so it was just kind of a fun, weird dinner party. And I think that that comes through."

== Reception ==
=== Viewers ===
In its original American broadcast, "P.I. Undercover: New York" was seen by an estimated 0.178 million household viewers with a 0.03 in the 18-49 demographics. This means that 0.03 percent of all households with televisions watched the episode. This was a 12% decrease in viewership from the previous episode, which was watched by 0.201 million household viewers with a 0.05 in the 18-49 demographics.

=== Critical reviews ===
"P.I. Undercover: New York" received mostly positive reviews from critics. William Hughes of The A.V. Club gave the episode a "B" grade and wrote, "Tonight's episode of What We Do In The Shadows, “P.I. Undercover: New York,” is a textbook example of the importance of character in a long-running comedy — for both good and ill. On the one hand, the episode's title plot, which sees Staten Island invaded by the crew of a TV crime show, is borderline insubstantial, mostly because it doesn't give Laszlo, Nandor, and Guillermo much more to do than fawn over (the admittedly great) Kevin Pollak and make some meta jokes about TV production. By contrast, the episode's B-plot, which teams up Colin and Nadja for a transcendently awkward dinner date, makes for some of the best comedy of the season. And it all comes down to the fundamental loneliness of Colin Robinson."

Alan Sepinwall wrote, "Another absolute banger of a What We Do in the Shadows this week, with Guillermo's favorite TV show, P.I. Undercover: New York filming outside the residence, and Nandor somehow getting a job as a production assistant. Every line reading out of Kayvan Novak's mouth has been a joy for six seasons, but for some reason, hearing Nandor say, “But first, I must go to crafty to fetch Taffy for scripty” made me especially giddy."

Katie Rife of Vulture gave the episode a 4 star rating out of 5 and wrote, "This week's episode seems like it originates from an inside joke on the What We Do in the Shadows set — and not in a bad way. If you had the privilege of hearing Matt Berry and Kayvan Novak goof off between takes while you waited for a lightbulb to get replaced or a stunt harness to get rigged, wouldn't you want to share that with the world too?" Melody McCune of Telltale TV gave the episode a 4 star rating out of 5, and wrote "Overall, “P.I. Undercover: New York” is a classic What We Do in the Shadows episode — as hilarious as it is heartwarming and wickedly entertaining. If Laszlo and Nandor giving Guillermo their swag doesn't give you the warm fuzzies, you might have the brain scramblies. That's my scientific opinion."
