= Kate Fansler =

- First appearance: In the Last Analysis
- Last appearance: The Edge of Doom
- Created by: Amanda Cross

In-universe information
- Gender: Female
- Occupation: University professor
- Nationality: American

Kate Fansler is the main character in a series of fourteen mystery novels written by Carolyn Gold Heilbrun from 1964 to 2002, under the pseudonym Amanda Cross.

== Overview ==
Like Heilbrun, Fansler was a literature professor at a prestigious New York university. In the books, she is called upon to solve mysteries set in an academic context, usually involving the murder of a professor or student. Her work is accomplished through conversation with the people involved, rather than through the physically adventurous antics preferred by other fictional detectives. Midway through the series, she married her partner, district attorney Reed Amhearst, but as she tells another character in A Trap For Fools, she "neither uses his name nor wears his ring". Echoing Heilbrun's personal views, she has little sentimental attachment to children, enjoys smoking, drinking, and fatty food, and in later books such as Sweet Death, Kind Death, meditates on the nature of middle age and on the liberating nature of death.

== Books in the series ==
1	In the Last Analysis	1964
2	The James Joyce Murder	1967
3	Poetic Justice	1970
4	The Theban Mysteries	1971
5	Question of Max	1976
6	Death in a Tenured Position	1981
7	Sweet Death, Kind Death	1984
8	No Word from Winifred	Jun-1986
9	A Trap for Fools	Apr-1989
10	The Players Come Again	Oct-1990
11	An Imperfect Spy	Jan-1995
12	The Puzzled Heart	Jan-1998
13	Honest Doubt	Nov-2000
14	The Edge of Doom	Oct-2002

== Bibliography ==
- New York Times article: "Rage in a Tenured Position"
