= York Community High School =

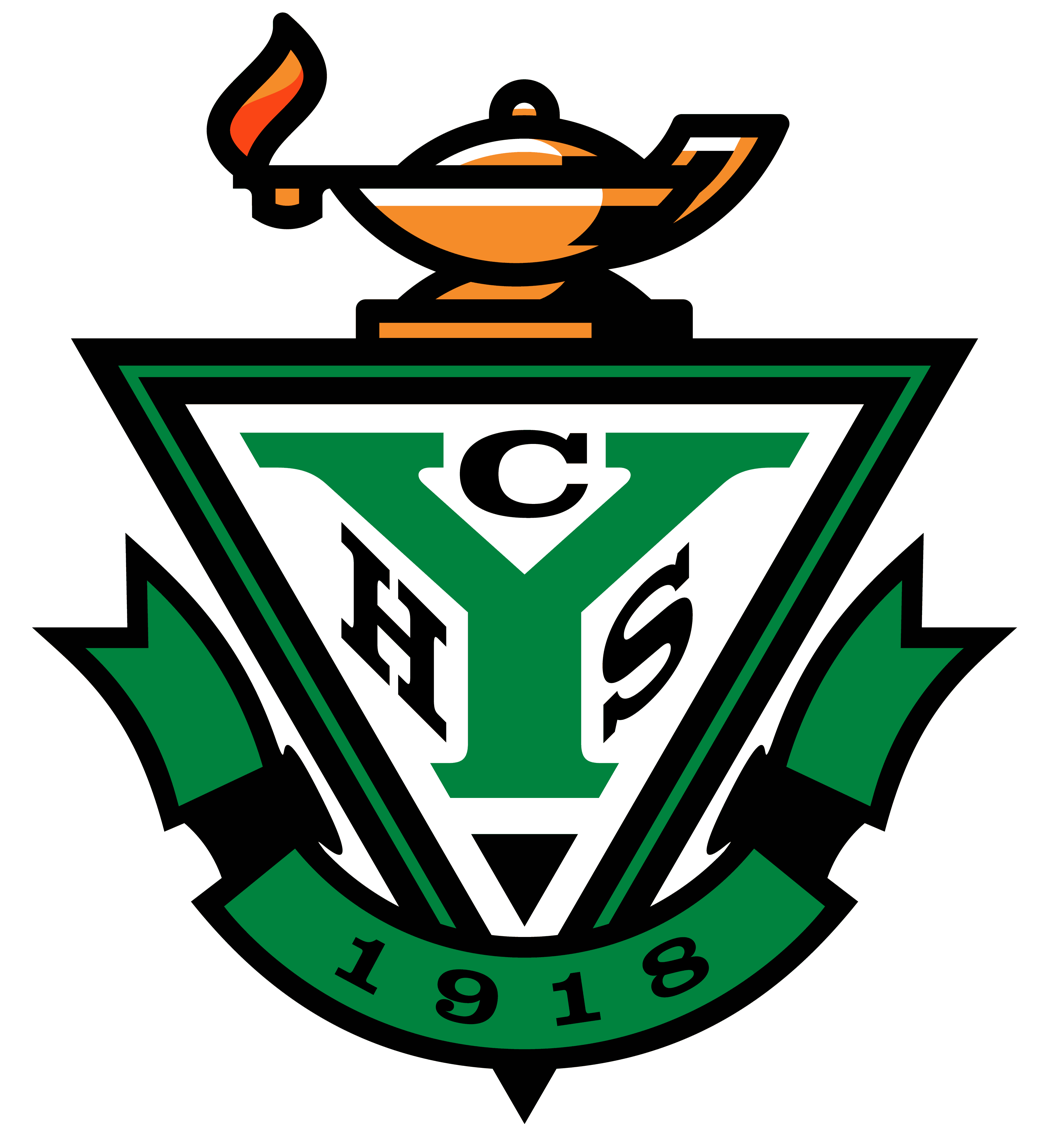

Location
- 355 W. St. Charles Road; Elmhurst, Dupage County, Illinois 60126; United States; 41.8924°N 87.9532°W

Information
- Type: Public secondary
- Religious affiliation: Secular
- Opened: 1918; 108 years ago
- School district: Elmhurst Community Unit 205
- Superintendent: Keisha Campbell
- Principal: Jessica Hurt
- Staff: 182.60 (FTE)
- Grades: 9-12
- Gender: Co-ed
- Enrollment: 2,677 (2023-2024)
- Average class size: 21.4
- Student to teacher ratio: 14.66
- Campus: Suburban
- Campus size: 600,000 square feet
- Colors: green white
- Slogan: We are D.U.K.E.S.
- Fight song: Hail To York High
- Athletics conference: West Suburban Conference
- Mascot: The Duke
- Nickname: Dukes
- Newspaper: York Hi
- Yearbook: Y's Tales
- GPA: 3.0 ( as of 2022 )
- Website: york.elmhurst205.org

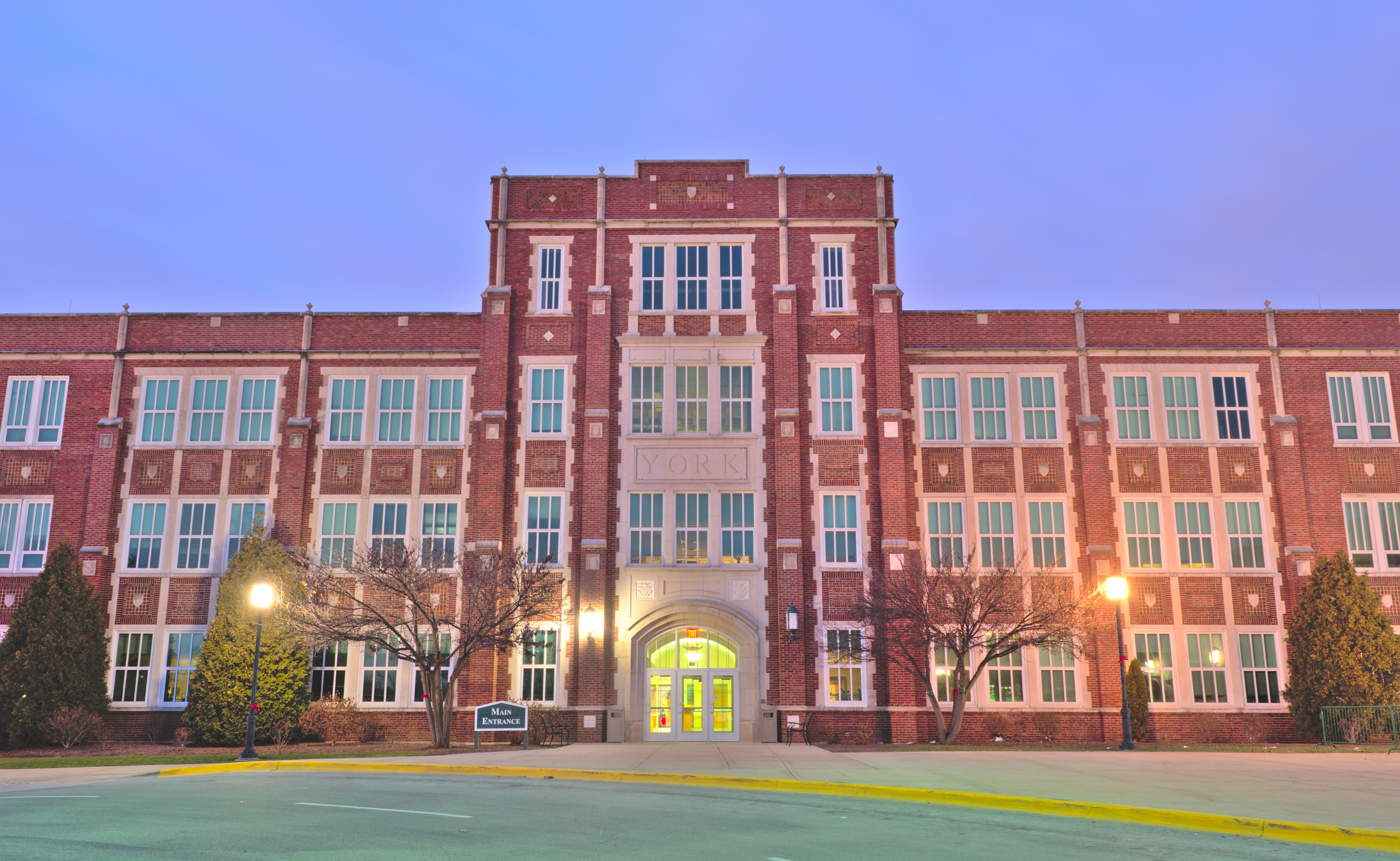
Main entrance to York Community High School in Elmhurst, IL

York Community High School is a public secondary school in Elmhurst, Illinois, United States. It is a part of the Elmhurst Community Unit School District 205. Most of the students reside in Elmhurst; however, the district also draws a small number of students from Addison, Bensenville, and Oak Brook. York is the only secondary school in District 205, which, as a unit school district also includes an early childhood center, eight elementary schools, three middle schools, and a transition center.

== History ==
Prior to 1918, Elmhurst operated a combined high school and grammar school, which was destroyed by fire in December 1917. York was established in 1918. The building saw many additions from 1950 through 1990, including a third floor, a four-classroom fourth floor, swimming pool, and additional facilities. In 2000, the voters of District 205 passed a referendum to rebuild the school. Construction started soon after and the new building, which was first opened in 2002, has separate academic, service, student commons and athletics areas (including a new fieldhouse).

== Academics ==
In 2017, York had an average composite ACT score of 24.5 and graduated 95.5% of its senior class. In 2017, 54% of the senior class had taken at least one Advanced Placement exam during high school, and of those who took an exam in 2017, 91% passed at least one of their exams. In 2011, Newsweek ranked York Community High School 257 out of 500 in its annual list of America's Best High Schools. Overall, according to the US News 2017 High School rankings, York Community High School is ranked 687 of all public high schools in the United States and ranked 18 of all high schools in the state of Illinois.

== Athletics ==
York High School competes in the West Suburban Conference. The school is also a member of the Illinois High School Association (IHSA), which governs most sports and competitive activities in Illinois.

The school sponsors interscholastic teams for young men and women in basketball, cross country, golf, gymnastics, soccer, swimming & diving, tennis, track & field, volleyball, cheerleading, and water polo. Young men may compete in baseball, football, and wrestling, while young women may compete in badminton, bowling, dance, and softball. While not sponsored by the IHSA, the school also sponsors teams for young men and women in lacrosse, and a poms team for young women. Also while not sponsored by the IHSA, York also has a men’s and a women’s hockey team.

York Community High School's athletic program was ranked 17th overall in the nation by ESPN RISE's FAB 50 list.

York Community High School's men's cross country team has won 28 state championships under coach Joe Newton: 1962, 1965, 1968, 1971, 1972, 1973, 1978AA, 1980AA, 1981AA, 1982AA, 1983AA, 1984AA, 1986AA, 1989AA, 1990AA, 1991AA, 1992AA, 1993AA, 1994AA, 1999AA, 2000AA, 2002AA, 2003AA, 2004AA, 2005AA, 2006AA, 2010-3A, and 2012-3A. He retired in 2016 because of problems with mobility and movement from his home to practice.

The baseball team won the state title in 1993, and took fourth place in Class 4A in 2023.

== Arts ==
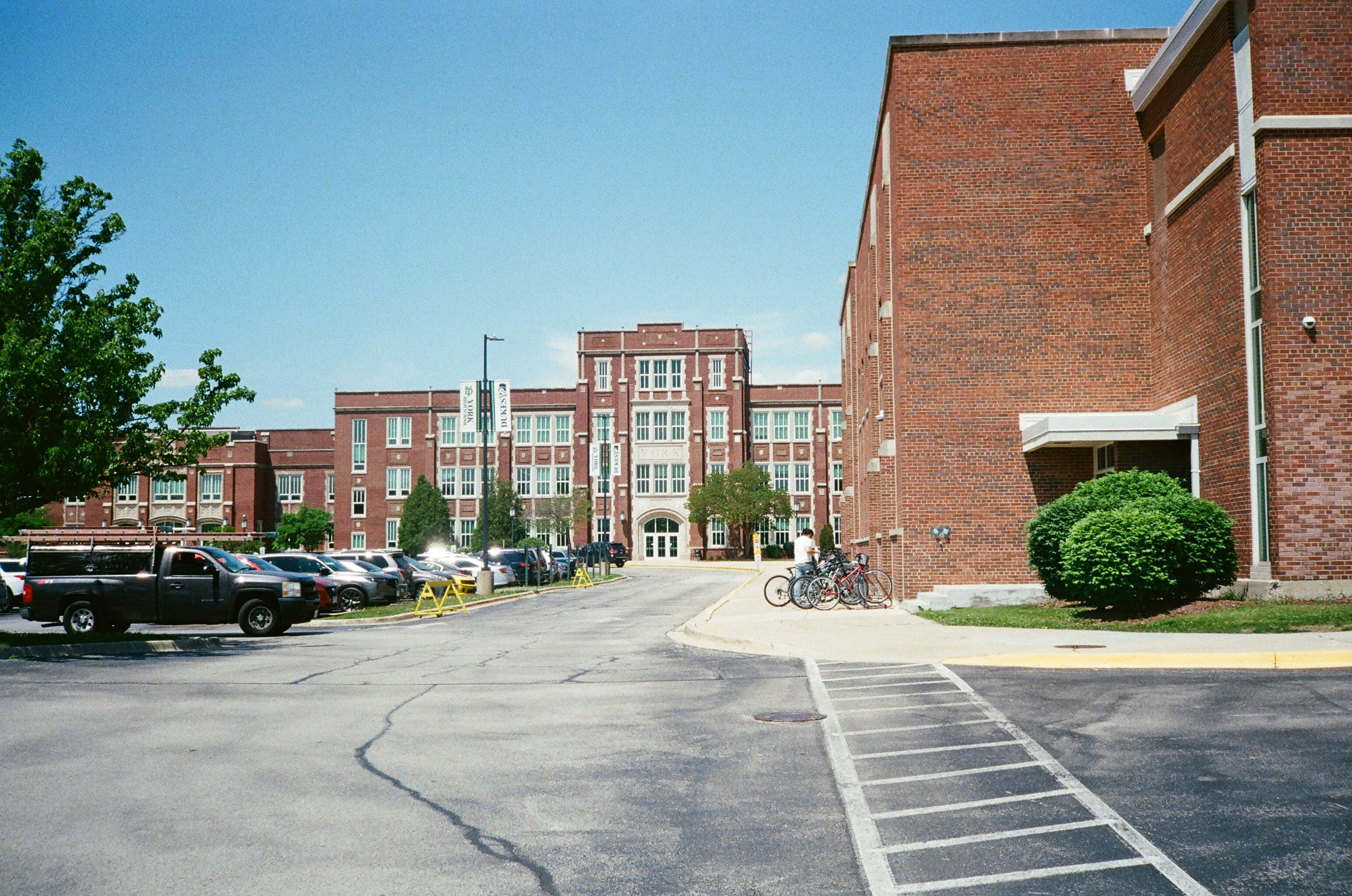
The south facade of York in May 2024

York Community High School's music program includes a full orchestra, three individual orchestras, three full bands, and three concert choirs. There are also two jazz bands, a-cappella singing groups, and percussion ensembles. York has a theater department that puts on three productions a year. The drama department received the Best Production award in 2017 and 2018 at the Illinois High School Musical Theater Awards (IHSMTA). The dance programs at York include the Advanced Dance Class and the York Dance Company.

== Notable alumni ==
- David Cohn (born 1995), American-Israeli basketball player
- Martin Forest Eberhard (born 1960) is an American engineer and business executive. He founded Tesla, Inc. (then Tesla Motors).
- Lee A. Daniels was an Illinois State Representative (1975–2006), who served as Speaker of the State House (1995–97).
- George J. Eade was a United States Air Force four-star general.
- Robert Goldsborough (1955), murder mystery novelist.
- Ron Guenther is a former athletic director for the University of Illinois at Urbana-Champaign.
- Rob Harley is a college football coach who is a defensive coordinator at Northern Illinois University.
- Garth Lagerwey, a former professional soccer player who is currently an executive with Real Salt Lake.
- Fred Lorenzen, former stock car driver and member of the NASCAR Hall of Fame.
- Timothy P. Marshall (1974), civil engineer and meteorologist, tornado expert, pioneering storm chaser
- Betty Okino is an actress and former gymnast. She was a member of the bronze medal-winning gymnastics team at the 1992 Summer Olympics.
- Ken Paulson is the president and chief operating officer of the Freedom Forum, Newseum and Diversity Institute; he is the former editor and senior vice president/news of USA Today and USATODAY.com.
- Gary Rydstrom (1977) is a multi-Academy Award winning sound mixer, sound effects editor, and director. His work in sound includes films such as Backdraft, Terminator 2: Judgment Day, and Jurassic Park.
- Donald Sage was an All-American cross country and track runner for Stanford University.
- Ian Michael Smith is an actor, known for his starring role in Simon Birch. Graduated in 2005.
- Floyd Swink was a botanist and author of books on the flora of the Chicago region.
- Tim Stratton was a tight end at Purdue University and was the inaugural winner of the John Mackey Award (2000), presented annually to Division 1A's best tight end.
- Charles Tilly (1946) was an American sociologist, political scientist, and historian.
- Ryan Sloan (2024) was the Illinois Gatorade Player of the Year in 2024. He was the 55th draft pick in the 2024 Major League Baseball draft to the Seattle Mariners.
- Garret Sparks (2012) was an NHL Goaltender for the LA Kings and Toronto Maple Leafs.

== Notable staff ==
- Joe Newton was the boys cross country coach from 1959 to 2016. He was also the boys track & field coach, having coached state championship teams in both sports. He was a member of the National Federation of State High School Associations (NFSHS) Hall of Fame. He was also an assistant marathon coach at the 1988 Seoul Olympics
- Donald Mark Sibley was a professional basketball player in the NBA.
- Mark Golebiowski currently teaches here.

== See also ==
- List of high schools in Illinois
