= Death in a Tenured Position =

1981 mystery novel by Amanda Cross

Death in a Tenured Position, winner of the Nero Award, is a mystery novel that is part of the Kate Fansler series written by Carolyn Gold Heilbrun under the pen name Amanda Cross. When Kate's acquaintance and colleague, Janet Mandelbaum, is found dead after being given tenure in the English department at Harvard University, Kate investigates the circumstances surrounding Janet's death. Through multiple twists and turns, Kate is able to find the shocking truth to what happened to Janet.

== Plot ==
The year is 1979, and Janet Mandelbaum has just been given tenure in the English department at Harvard University. Although Janet is excited, many of her male colleagues seem to be dissatisfied with Janet's recent award. Soon after her award, Janet's old friend Kate Fansler comes to work at Harvard and is able to give support to her friend. While there, Kate encounters her old friend Moon Mandelbaum, Janet's ex-husband, and meets other professors in the English Department. Kate learns through her new colleagues that Janet is not fitting in well at the university. In fact, many people find Janet too strange and unlikable.

After an incident when Janet was found in a bathtub, presumably drunk, Janet becomes embarrassed, and both Moon and Kate notice the change in her mood. As her friend, Kate hopes that this situation does not harm Janet's credibility at the university, although she finds that many of the professors no longer care for Janet. Although Kate defends Janet, it is no use. Many people ridicule Janet and seem to have no desire to get to know her better.

One day while Kate is in her office, she receives a phone call from Professor Clarkville (another member of the English department). Clarkville explains to Kate that he has found Janet dead in the men's restroom. Immediately the question is, "Was Janet killed by a fellow professor"? Kate seems skeptical of this idea because she knows that other than not being liked, no one had anything to gain from Janet's death. Kate decides that she is going to investigate this peculiar death. One of the first few pieces she learns is that Janet's death was caused by cyanide and Janet's body was moved to the men's restroom after her death, but where and when she actually died is still a mystery to Kate and the police.

Kate then visits Professor Clarkville to further discuss the situation. To her surprise, Clarkville explains that he did not know of Janet much before finding her in the men's restroom. He also says that he did not think that Janet should have come to Harvard. Immediately Kate becomes very leery of Clarkville and his confessions to Kate.

Back at her office, Kate is contemplating all the different circumstances surrounding Janet's death. While she is working, she receives a phone call from Moon. Moon tells Kate he is in jail under the charges of murder for Janet's death but assures Kate he is not responsible for what happened. Moon reveals that he did have possession of cyanide long ago but tells Kate that it is locked away in a safe back in Minneapolis.

Kate now has three suspects for Janet's death: Clarkville, Moon, and Luellen May (a fellow professor who found Janet passed out in the bathtub at a party). After a visit from Janet's brother and a tour of Janet's old apartment, Kate begins to put some ideas together about what really happened to Janet. Kate then visits with Clarkville once more to discuss his finding of Janet's body. In the meeting, Clarkville explains that the last time anyone had seen Janet alive was in the department meeting. During the meeting, Janet had become hysterical about an issue that caused a lot of tension in the room. Kate then gets Clarkville to admit to moving Janet's body to the men's room for her to be 'discovered.' Clarkville explains that he had originally found Janet in the chairman's office dead and decided to move her to a restroom (the men's room was the closest) and reported finding her there. Kate then is granted access to Janet's office at the university and finds a poem that she believes is the biggest clue to Janet's death.

Kate finally proposes to Moon's lawyer, John Cunningham, that Janet's death was a suicide over a dinner at the Locke-Ober restaurant. Kate reveals that Janet stole the cyanide from Moon, and after the amount of stress and tension Janet had endured at the university, she decided to end her own life.

== Main characters ==
- Kate Fansler
- Janet Mandelbaum
- Moon Mandelbaum
- Professor Clarkville
- John Cunningham
- Sylvia

== Themes ==
One of the major themes in the novel is feminism and discrimination against women. Carolyn Gold Heilbrun herself was a professor in the English department at Columbia and she says that she experienced many instances of discrimination during her career. The book itself shows Janet's own struggle with discrimination as a female professor. Heilbrun is notable for writing themes about feminism in her novels. This one shows feminism through her character Kate Fansler. Kate is a successful and independent professor and amateur detective. Kate can be found as the main character in other books by Heilbrun. There are fourteen other mystery novels in the Kate Fansler mystery series.

== Reception ==
The review in The Boston Phoenix called the novel "a non-polemical attack on academia that is written with wit and style."
