= C. W. Whitten =

- Born: August 6, 1871 near Bradford, Illinois
- Died: October 23, 1957 (aged 86); St. Petersburg, Florida
- Occupations: athletic administrator, educator

Charles William "C. W." Whitten (August 6, 1871 – October 23, 1957) was an American educator and athletic administrator. As the chief executive of both the Illinois High School Athletic Association and the National Federation of State High School Athletic Associations, he exerted widespread influence on interscholastic athletic policy in the United States from 1922 until his retirement in 1944. In 1930, he led the effort by high school principals to eliminate national high school championships sponsored by universities, and in particular, the National Interscholastic Basketball Tournament held at the University of Chicago. In his memoir, Interscholastics, published in 1950, Whitten wrote about the place of athletics within the framework of secondary education and the issues faced by high school athletic associations.

== Early life ==
C. W. Whitten was born on the family farm in Penn Township, near Bradford, Illinois, in 1871. After grade school Whitten took several classes at the Bradford town school, since there were no nearby high schools. He earned his teacher's certificate when he was just sixteen years old and taught in rural schools in Stark County and Marshall County until 1894. Whitten then attended Illinois State Normal University for a year but could not afford to continue. He spent the next three years as principal at the grade school in Varna, Illinois before returning to ISNU, where he completed his degree in 1900.

Upon his graduation, Whitten was hired as assistant professor in science and mathematics at ISNU, moving in 1903 to the University of Illinois to teach physics and solid geometry while also taking advanced courses. In 1906 he gained a position as assistant professor of physics and chemistry at Northern Illinois State Normal School, becoming a full professor in 1909.

== As chief executive ==
In 1916, Whitten left higher education to become the principal at nearby DeKalb High School. Five years later, he was elected to the board of control of the Illinois High School Athletic Association. At the time the IHSAA had no employees. The duties of the Association were handled by board members, and Whitten, as vice president of the board, was assigned the task of reorganizing the state basketball tournament, which had become unwieldy. Whitten reduced the size of the state finals from 21 teams to four and introduced an intermediate level of sectional tournaments around the state, a move that increased attendance. Pleased with the results, the board of control offered him the position of full-time manager of the IHSAA in May 1922.

Soon afterward, Whitten assumed the same role for the National Federation of State High School Athletic Associations. The Federation had no staff and its affairs were nominally taken care of by its secretary-treasurer, L. W. Smith. Smith was secretary of the IHSAA board of control and delegated his Federation duties to Whitten, who handled them without any formal title until 1927. From then until 1940, Whitten served officially as secretary-treasurer of the NFSHSAA, although he received no compensation for his efforts until several years into his tenure.

In 1925 Whitten was recruited by the Illinois Intercollegiate Athletic Conference (also known as the Little Nineteen) to serve as its athletic commissioner. Accepting the job on the condition that it not interfere with his high school work, Whitten led all three amateur sports organizations simultaneously. A few months into the job, Whitten publicly accused J. Stanley Brown, the president of Northern Illinois State Normal School, of ordering his football coach to play three ineligible players in a contest against North Central College, among other irregularities. Brown subsequently lost a vote of no-confidence by the school's faculty and resigned in 1927. Whitten served as Little Nineteen commissioner until the position was eliminated in 1933, a result of the general economic downturn.

== State and national issues ==
Whitten was the first full-time executive director of any state high school athletic association. His accomplishments in the first few years of his tenure included securing the financial stability of the organization, cleaning up rampant problems with athletic eligibility at certain schools, and bringing the statewide girls' athletic association program under IHSAA control. After hiring H. V. Porter as assistant manager in 1927, the pair tackled many issues at both the state and national level. The IHSAA developed a program to license athletic officials, initiated the publication of an in-house magazine, developed a catastrophic insurance program for student-athletes, and added state tournament series in several sports.

One of the concerns leading to the formation of the National Federation of State High School Associations in 1920 was the National Interscholastic Basketball Tournament held at the University of Chicago. Many high school principals did not see any academic benefit in having students travel cross-country to participate in a week-long tournament after they had just won a state championship. The tournament, run by the legendary Amos Alonzo Stagg, grew from 23 teams in 1917 to a high of 43 in 1927, before support among state associations and the National Federation began to crumble. Whitten was at the forefront of the battle and took considerable abuse from sportswriters who labeled him a "dictator" bent on destroying the tournament. Whitten consistently explained that he was merely advancing the interests of the state associations. In 1930, a majority of Federation members voted not to sanction any further national championships. Stagg's tournament scraped by that year by inviting private schools, schools from non-Federation states, and a few other rogue institutions. Soon thereafter the university's president, Robert Maynard Hutchins, withdrew his support for the interscholastic meet, ending the debate.

In 1940, when the IHSAA was reorganized to include non-athletic activities as well as sports, it adopted a new constitution and shortened name: the Illinois High School Association. Whitten, 68 years old and in failing health, was inclined to retire and allow Porter, his protege, to run the new organization. His plan was upset when the National Federation of State High School Athletic Associations hired Porter as its first full-time executive. Rather than turn over the association's affairs to a new director with no experience, Whitten continued at the helm for two more years (with the new title of executive secretary) until his successor, Albert Willis, could be trained. After finally stepping down in 1942, he worked in a part-time capacity for two more years.

In his retirement Whitten spent six years writing his memoir, Interscholastics: A Discussion of Interscholastic Contests, which served as a manual for administrators in the various state high school athletic associations.

== Personal life ==
C. W. Whitten was married twice. His first wife was Henrietta Leigh, one of his pupils in his early days as a teacher, with whom he had two daughters, Jennie and Mabel. Henrietta died of typhoid fever in 1901. Jennie became a professor of foreign languages at Illinois State University; the former Whitten Hall dormitory was named in her honor. C. W. Whitten married again in 1904, to Jessie Cunningham. They relocated to St. Petersburg, Florida, in 1947, where Whitten died in 1957 at the age of 86. His ashes are inurned in the mausoleum of Park Hill Cemetery in Bloomington, Illinois.

Whitten received an honorary doctorate degree from Bradley University in 1951 at the same time as then-Senator Richard M. Nixon.
