= Robert Barnard =

English novelist

Robert Barnard (23 November 1936 – 19 September 2013) was an English crime writer, critic and lecturer. In addition to over 40 books published under his own name, he also published four books under the pseudonym Bernard Bastable.

== Life and work ==
Robert Barnard was born on 23 November 1936 at Burnham-on-Crouch, Essex. He was educated at the Colchester Royal Grammar School and at Balliol College, Oxford.

He spent five years (1961-1965) as an academic in the English Department at the University of New England, at Armidale, New South Wales, in Australia.

His first crime novel, Death of an Old Goat, was published in 1974. The novel was written while he was a lecturer at the University of Tromsø in Norway. He went on to write more than 40 other books and numerous short stories. As "Bernard Bastable", he published two standalone novels and two alternate history books, featuring Wolfgang Mozart – who had here survived to old age – as a detective.

Barnard was inducted into the prestigious Detection Club in 1991, and was awarded the Cartier Diamond Dagger in 2003 by the Crime Writers' Association for a lifetime of achievement. He said that his favourite crime writer was Agatha Christie. In 1980 he published a critique of her work titled A Talent to Deceive: An Appreciation of Agatha Christie.

Barnard died on 19 September 2013. He and his wife Louise lived in Yorkshire.

== Bibliography ==
=== Mystery novels ===
- Death of an Old Goat (1974) ISBN 0002311984
- A Little Local Murder (1976)
- Death on the High Cs (1977)
- Blood Brotherhood (1977) ISBN 0-8027-5387-6
- Unruly Son (1978) a.k.a. Death of a Mystery Writer
- Posthumous Papers (1979) a.k.a. Death of a Literary Widow
- Death in a Cold Climate (1980)
- Mother's Boys (1981) a.k.a. Death of a Perfect Mother
- Little Victims (1983) a.k.a. School for Murder
- Out of the Blackout (1984)
- A Corpse in a Gilded Cage (1984)
- Disposal of the Living (1985) a.k.a. Fete Fatale ISBN 0-00-231978-0
- Political Suicide (1986)
- The Skeleton in the Grass (1987)
- At Death's Door (1988) ISBN 978-0-00-232195-2
- A City of Strangers (1990) ISBN 978-0-440-20750-4
- A Scandal in Belgravia (1991) ISBN 978-1-890208-16-5
- Masters of the House (1994) ISBN 978-0-380-72511-3
- Touched by the Dead (1999) a.k.a. A Murder in Mayfair ISBN 978-0-00-232684-1
- A Cry From The Dark (2003) ISBN 978-0-7432-5345-1
- Dying Flames (2005) ISBN 978-0-7432-7219-3
- Last Post (2008) ISBN 978-0-7490-8068-6
- Stranger in the Family (2010) ISBN 978-1-4391-7674-0

==== Charlie Peace novels ====
Focuses on the investigations of black policeman Charlie Peace as he progresses from a young Constable to a seasoned Inspector.

- Death and the Chaste Apprentice (1989) ISBN 0684190028
- A Fatal Attachment (1992) ISBN 978-0-380-71998-3
- A Hovering of Vultures (1993) ISBN 978-0-380-77653-5
- The Bad Samaritan (1995) ISBN 978-0-00-232562-2
- No Place of Safety (1997) ISBN 978-0-684-84503-6
- The Corpse at the Haworth Tandoori (1998) ISBN 978-0-7432-2427-7
- Unholy Dying (2000) a.k.a. Turbulent Priest ISBN 978-0-7432-0149-0
- The Bones in the Attic (2001) ISBN 978-0-684-87379-4
- The Mistress of Alderley (2002) ISBN 978-0-7490-0686-0
- The Graveyard Position (2004) ISBN 978-0-7432-5346-8
- A Fall from Grace (2006) ISBN 978-0-7432-7220-9
- The Killings on Jubilee Terrace (2009) ISBN 978-1-4165-5942-9
- A Charitable Body (2012) ISBN 978-1-4391-7743-3

==== Perry Trethowan novels ====
Focuses on Scotland Yard detective Perry Trethowan.

- Death by Sheer Torture (1981)
- Death and the Princess (1982)
- The Missing Bronte (1983)
- Bodies (1986)
- Death in Purple Prose (1987) a.k.a. The Cherry Blossom Corpse

=== Short story collections ===
- Death of a Salesperson and Other Untimely Exits (1989) ISBN 978-0-6841-9088-4
- The Habit of Widowhood (1996) ISBN 978-0-6848-2648-6
- Rogue's Gallery (2011) ISBN 978-0-7490-1017-1

=== Novels written as Bernard Bastable ===
- To Die Like a Gentleman (1993)
- Dead, Mr. Mozart (1995) ISBN 978-0-312-11771-9
- Mansion and its Murder (1998) ISBN 978-0-7867-0515-3
- Too Many Notes, Mr. Mozart (1998) ISBN 978-0-7515-1806-1

=== Non-fiction ===
- Imagery and Theme in the Novels of Dickens (1974)
- A Talent to Deceive: An Appreciation of Agatha Christie (1980)
- A Short History of English Literature (1984) ISBN 978-0-631-19088-2
- Emily Brontë (British Library Writers' lives series) (2000) ISBN 0-7123-4658-9
- A Brontë Encyclopedia (with Louise Barnard) (2007) ISBN 1-4051-5119-6
