= March Madness (What We Do in the Shadows) =

- What We Do in the Shadows episode
- Episode no.: Season 6 Episode 7
- Directed by: Yana Gorskaya
- Written by: Jeremy Levick; Rajat Suresh
- Cinematography by: Bevan Crothers
- Editing by: Liza Cardinale; Matthew Freund
- Production code: XWS06007
- Original air date: November 18, 2024
- Running time: 25 minutes

Guest appearances
- Anthony Atamanuik as Sean Rinaldi; Tim Heidecker as Jordan; Marissa Jaret Winokur as Charmaine Rinaldi; Jon Glaser as Sports Demon; Mike O'Brien as Jerry the Vampire; Andy Assaf as Cravensworth's Monster; Jeremy Levick as Jimmy; Rajat Suresh as Cannon Employee

Episode chronology
← Previous "Laszlo's Father"	Next → "P.I. Undercover: New York"

"March Madness" is the seventh episode of the sixth season of the American mockumentary comedy horror television series What We Do in the Shadows, set in the franchise of the same name. It is the 57th overall episode of the series and was written by co-producers Jeremy Levick and Rajat Suresh, and directed by executive producer Yana Gorskaya. It was released on FX on November 18, 2024.

The series is set in Staten Island, New York City. Like the 2014 film, the series follows the lives of vampires in the city. These consist of three vampires, Nandor, Laszlo, and Nadja. They live alongside Colin Robinson, an energy vampire; and Guillermo, Nandor's familiar. The series explores the absurdity and misfortunes experienced by the vampires. In the episode, Laszlo and Nandor summon a sports demon to help fight a demon that possesses Sean, while Guillermo tries to find his "identity" in the office.

According to Nielsen Media Research, the episode was seen by an estimated 0.201 million household viewers and gained a 0.05 ratings share among adults aged 18–49. The episode received positive reviews from critics, who praised Glaser's guest appearance and humor, although many considered the episode weaker than the previous episodes.

== Plot ==
Laszlo (Matt Berry) and Nandor (Kayvan Novak) quickly check on Sean (Anthony Atamanuik) at his house, who has been yelling constantly. After seeing a pattern in his behavior, Laszlo concludes that Sean is possessed by a demon. While Nandor suggests mercy killing him, Laszlo refuses to let Sean die.

Guillermo (Harvey Guillén) hopes to find an "identity" in Cannon Capital, but finds that his co-workers already have specific traits taken already, including Nadja (Natasia Demetriou). Colin Robinson (Mark Proksch) suggests he could be the "repressed hothead", as he can only display this every few weeks. They try to pull this during a meeting with Jordan (Tim Heidecker), but Colin Robinson shocks the attendees by punching Guillermo. As Guillermo tries to explain the situation to his co-workers, Colin Robinson once again attacks him and is escorted out of the building.

Laszlo and Nandor get the Guide (Kristen Schaal) to summon a demon, intending for it to fight Sean's demon. The new demon (Jon Glaser) is a sports fan, and is very interested in watching March Madness with Sean's demon. During the attempt to exorcise it, Sean loses consciousness and is taken to the hospital. The doctor diagnoses Sean with non-ST-elevation myocardial infarction, and warns that he could die due to his high blood pressure. Laszlo promises to get Sean into a new athletic regime, while the Sports Demon leaves after his team loses a game. While Laszlo takes Sean to a gym, Nandor spends time with Charmaine (Marissa Jaret Winokur), as an Al-Quolanudar warrior would take care of a fallen's wife. When Charmaine asks if he has a love life, Nandor explains that he has started developing feelings for someone: the Guide.

Sean falls back into the hospital, confiding to Laszlo that he will die young like other family members. Laszlo is devastated by the possibility, but helps Sean in getting a foot-long sandwich as he desired. Jordan tells Guillermo that he hopes he does not sue the company for Colin Robinson's actions, which Guillermo confirms will not happen. Jordan then asks Guillermo to help keep secret details from SEC, giving him the nickname of "The Vault", delighting Guillermo. Nandor decides to visit the Guide with flowers, hoping to invite her to watch Wipeout with him. He is instead greeted by Jerry (Mike O'Brien), and reluctantly gives him the flowers.

== Production ==
=== Development ===
In October 2024, FX confirmed that the seventh episode of the season would be titled "March Madness", and that it would be written by co-producers Jeremy Levick and Rajat Suresh, and directed by executive producer Yana Gorskaya. This was Levick's second writing credit, Suresh's second writing credit, and Gorskaya's 21st directing credit.

== Reception ==
=== Viewers ===
In its original American broadcast, "March Madness" was seen by an estimated 0.201 million household viewers with a 0.05 in the 18-49 demographics. This means that 0.05 percent of all households with televisions watched the episode. This was a 7% increase in viewership from the previous episode, which was watched by 0.187 million household viewers with a 0.05 in the 18-49 demographics.

=== Critical reviews ===
"March Madness" received positive reviews from critics. William Hughes of The A.V. Club gave the episode a "B" grade and wrote, "“March Madness” isn't a dull episode of TV, something you might notice around the time that a red, horned demon played by Jon Glaser rips his own body apart in a gorgeously sudden explosion of blood. But it's also a pretty standard episode of What We Do In The Shadows, arriving at a time when the show only has so many cracks at bat left. Shadows is a series that pretty much only ever looks bad when compared to itself, but despite a few high points, and a few laugh-out loud moments, “March Madness” probably isn't going on any “greatest episodes of all time” lists, either."

Alan Sepinwall wrote, "we’ve gotten one banger after another set at Cannon Capital, this time with Colin Robinson trying to help Guillermo figure out his office “thing.” Even better was Laszlo and Nandor seeing Sean melting down over March Madness and assuming his behavior was due to demonic possession, because what else could explain such extreme highs and lows in so short a span? Bonus points for Jon Glaser as a demon who's just as obsessed with the NCAA tournament as Sean, particularly for Glaser's pronunciation of “Gonzaga.”" Katie Rife of Vulture gave the episode a 3 star rating out of 5 and wrote, "At one point, the “sportsball” of it all in this week's episode might have felt like low-hanging fruit. But the culture has shifted, and the pendulum has swung, and the time has come once again to make fun of jocks. “March Madness” does this without making any cracks that are too obvious, which is a relief. Instead, it's part of a lampooning of masculine posturing that subtly pervades this week's episode."

Noel Murray of Episodic Medium wrote, "On the whole, “March Madness” is one of the lesser Shadows episodes from this season, although Season 6 has been so good that even this relatively weak 22 minutes is still pretty strong." Melody McCune of Telltale TV gave the episode a 3 star rating out of 5, and wrote the episode "“March Madness” boasts a hysterical concept for a story: the vampires mistaking Sean's intense love of basketball for demonic possession. Even if it somewhat misses the bar due to narrative structuring and pacing, there's still plenty to love here. Matt Berry and Anthony Atamanuik are a dynamite combo."
