= National Federation of State High School Associations =

Sports governing body in the United States

- Abbreviation: NFHS
- Formation: 1920
- Type: 501(c)(3) - Tax Exempt
- Legal status: Association
- Purpose: Athletic/Educational
- Headquarters: 690 W. Washington Street, Indianapolis, Indiana, U.S.
- Location: Indianapolis, Indiana, U.S.
- Region served: United States
- Members: 18,500+ high schools
- Executive Director: Karissa Niehoff
- Staff: 40
- Website: nfhs.org

The National Federation of State High School Associations (NFHS) is the body that writes the rules of competition for most high school sports and activities in the United States. NFHS's headquarters are located in White River State Park in Indianapolis, Indiana.

== Member and affiliate associations ==
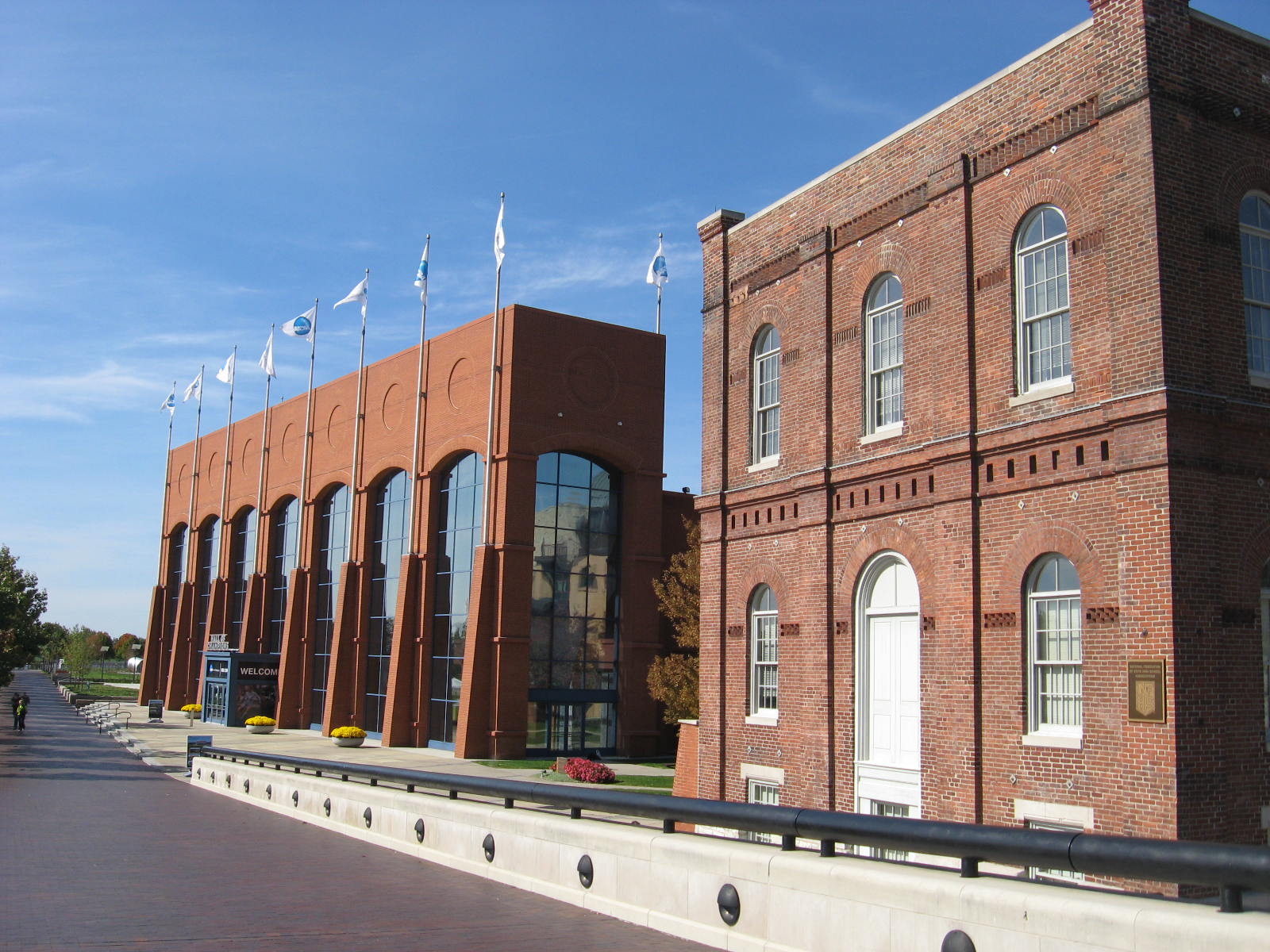
The federation's headquarters in Indianapolis with the NCAA Hall of Champions in the background

Over 19,500 high schools belong to associations that are members of the NFHS. Most high schools, whether public or private, belong to their state's high school association; in turn, each state association belongs to the NFHS. However, in states that have separate associations for public and non-public high schools, only the public-school bodies are full NFHS members.

For example, the Texas University Interscholastic League (public schools, with non-public schools generally not allowed) is a full member; the largest association governing non-public schools, the Texas Association of Private and Parochial Schools, is an affiliate member, while other governing bodies are not NFHS members at any level. Similarly, the Virginia High School League, open only to public schools, is a full member, the state's largest association for non-public schools is an affiliate member, and other governing bodies are not members at all.

The case in Mississippi is slightly different; the body governing public schools is a full member, while the body governing private schools is an NFHS affiliate that also includes private schools from several neighboring states. In the state of Alabama, the public schools and a handful of private schools compete in the AHSAA (Alabama High School Athletic Association) which is a full member of the NFHS. The majority of private schools in the state are members of the AISA (Alabama Independent School Association) a non-member that uses NFHS rules. The AHSAA will not allow its members to play AISA schools but the AISA schools do compete with public and private schools outside of Alabama.

Iowa has separate governing associations for boys' and girls' sports, respectively the Iowa High School Athletic Association and the Iowa Girls High School Athletic Union. Only the Iowa High School Athletic Association is a full member of the NFHS; the girls' governing body is an affiliate member.

The provincial associations of Canada are affiliate members of the NFHS.

The NFHS publishes rules books for each sport or activity, and most states adopt those rules wholly for state high school competition including the non member private school associations. NFHS rules occasionally differ from standard national or international rules. Several sports, notably golf and tennis, do not have an NFHS-specific rulebook and instead defer to standard rules from a national governing body (the USGA and USTA) with each state association free to adjust conditions of competition to suit local needs.

The NFHS offered an online Coach Education Program in January 2007. It released a course, Fundamentals of Coaching. The NFHS has announced that it will offer a National Coach Certification in September 2009. This will enable to coaches to become a Level 1 - Accredited Interscholastic Coach issued by the NFHS.

=== Member associations ===
- Alabama High School Athletic Association
- Alaska School Activities Association
- Arizona Interscholastic Association
- Arkansas Activities Association
- California Interscholastic Federation
- Colorado High School Activities Association
- Connecticut Interscholastic Athletic Conference
- Delaware Interscholastic Athletic Association
- District of Columbia Interscholastic Athletic Association
- District of Columbia State Athletic Association
- Florida High School Athletic Association
- Georgia High School Association
- Hawaii High School Athletic Association
- Idaho High School Activities Association
- Illinois High School Association
- Indiana High School Athletic Association
- Iowa High School Athletic Association
- Kansas State High School Activities Association
- Kentucky High School Athletic Association
- Louisiana High School Athletic Association
- Maine Principals' Association
- Maryland Public Secondary Schools Athletic Association
- Massachusetts Interscholastic Athletic Association
- Michigan High School Athletic Association
- Minnesota State High School League
- Mississippi High School Activities Association
- Missouri State High School Activities Association
- Montana High School Association
- Nebraska School Activities Association
- Nevada Interscholastic Activities Association
- New Hampshire Interscholastic Athletic Association
- New Jersey State Interscholastic Athletic Association
- New Mexico Activities Association
- New York State Public High School Athletic Association
- North Carolina High School Athletic Association
- North Dakota High School Activities Association
- Ohio High School Athletic Association
- Oklahoma Secondary School Activities Association
- Oregon School Activities Association
- Pennsylvania Interscholastic Athletic Association
- Rhode Island Interscholastic League
- South Carolina High School League
- South Dakota High School Activities Association
- Tennessee Secondary School Athletic Association
- University Interscholastic League (Texas)
- Utah High School Activities Association
- Vermont Principals' Association
- Virginia High School League
- Washington Interscholastic Activities Association
- West Virginia Secondary School Activities Commission
- Wisconsin Interscholastic Athletic Association
- Wyoming High School Activities Association

=== Affiliate associations ===
- Alberta Schools Athletic Association
- British Columbia School Sports
- Department of Defense Education Activity
- Florida School Music Association
- Georgia Independent School Association
- Illinois Elementary School Association
- Independent Interscholastic Athletic Association of Guam
- Iowa Girls High School Athletic Union
- Iowa High School Music Association
- Manitoba High Schools Athletic Association, Inc
- Michigan Interscholastic Forensic Association
- Midsouth Association of Independent Schools
- New Brunswick Interscholastic Athletic Association
- New York Catholic High School Athletic Association
- New York State Association of Independent Schools Athletic Association
- North Carolina Independent Schools Athletic Association
- Nova Scotia School Athletic Federation
- Ontario Federation of School Athletic Associations
- Oregon Interscholastic Ski Racing Association
- Pennsylvania Independent Schools Athletic Association
- Réseau du sport étudiant du Québec
- Saint Thomas Saint John Interscholastic Association
- Saskatchewan High Schools Athletic Association
- School Sports Newfoundland and Labrador
- South Carolina Independent School Association
- St. Croix Interscholastic Athletic Association
- Texas Association of Private and Parochial Schools
- Virginia Independent Schools Athletic Association
- Wisconsin High School Forensic Association
- Wisconsin School Music Association

== Players by sport ==
Pos	Sport	Total	Boys	Girls
1	Track and field (outdoor)	1,131,348	625,333	506,015
2	American football (11-player)	1,035,602	1,031,508	4,094
3	Basketball	903,952	536,668	367,284
4	Soccer	851,378	467,483	383,895
5	Volleyball	564,380	85,255	479,125
6	Baseball	473,073	471,701	1,372
7	Cross-country	432,350	239,381	192,969
8	Tennis	353,601	157,835	195,766
9	Softball (fast pitch)	345,607	156	345,451
10	Swimming and diving	254,973	116,799	138,174
11	Wrestling	356,131	291,874	64,257
12	Golf	238,010	155,174	82,836
13	Lacrosse	216,205	115,001	101,204
14	Competitive spirit	186,151	5,128	181,023
15	Track and field (indoor)	151,714	82,248	69,466
	Total (2023–24)	8,062,302	4,638,785	3,423,517

== Executive Directors ==
- L. W. Smith, 1920–27 (secretary of the board)
- C. W. Whitten, 1927–40 (manager, later executive secretary)
- H. V. Porter, 1940–58 (executive secretary)
- Cliff Fagan, 1958–77 (executive secretary)
- Brice B. Durbin, 1977–1993
- Robert F. Kanaby, 1993–2010
- Robert B. Gardner, 2010–2018
- Karissa Niehoff, 2018–present

== National High School Hall of Fame ==
The National High School Hall of Fame is a program of the National Federation of State High School Associations that honors individuals who have made outstanding contributions to high school sports or performing arts. Since 1986, the Hall of Fame enshrinement ceremony has been the final event of the National Federation's annual summer meeting, which is held in late June and early July and attended by board members and executives of the state high school associations.

== See also ==
- Gatorade Player of the Year awards (in various sports)
- Wendy's High School Heisman (student-athletes in various sports)
