= A Scandal in Belgravia (book) =

1991 novel by Robert Barnard

- First edition (UK)
- Author: Robert Barnard
- Cover artist: Gary Benfield
- Language: English
- Subject: Crime fiction
- Genre: Mystery
- Published: London
- Publisher: Bantam Books (UK); Charles Scribner's Sons (US)
- Publication date: 1991
- Publication place: United Kingdom
- Media type: Print (hardback, paperback), e-book
- Pages: 245 pages (hardback)
- ISBN: 0-684-19322-1
- Dewey Decimal: 823.914

A Scandal in Belgravia is a 1991 book by British author Robert Barnard. The book was first published in August 1991 by Charles Scribner's Sons and has since been through several reprints and has also been released in ebook formats. The novel won the Nero Award in 1992.

== Synopsis ==
The story is set in London, and the murder took place in the wealthy Belgravia area. It is narrated by Peter Proctor, a former politician. As he writes his memoirs Proctor recalls the murder of a close friend many years ago, while he was a diplomat at the Foreign and Commonwealth Office. His friend, Timothy Wycliffe, the grandson of a marquess and son of a politician, was adventurous, ambitious and humorous, and gay—before homosexuality was legalised. Proctor sets out to find the truth behind his friend's death.

== Reception ==
The book garnered positive reviews upon release. Publishers Weekly praised it as "elegant", observing "Barnard brilliantly depicts a seedy, struggling London in the '50s, the Suez fiasco as a symbol of the death of empire and Timothy's murder as a symbol of a wholly different social climate", while Kirkus Reviews deemed it "quietly engrossing" throughout. It won the Nero Award that same year.

Critic Martin Edwards in Mystery Scene, in a 2012 appraisal of Bernard's corpus of work over his forty-year career opined "...and if I were asked to name my all-time favourite Barnard novel, [it] would be a strong candidate, not least because of a splendid late plot twist". He also noted the same title was used for an Emmy-nominated episode (its plot was loosely based on the Sherlock Holmes story "A Scandal in Bohemia") of the BBC series Sherlock.

Scholar Drewey Wayne Gunn in the 2013 book The Gay Male Sleuth in Print and Film, which analysed milestones in the development of historical gay detective fiction, in the 1990s, singles it out as the "best of the lot".
