= March Madness (board game) =

Basketball-themed game

March Madness is a board game published in 1991 by Avalon Hill.

== Contents ==
March Madness is a game in which college basketball is represented on a board that resembles a 64 place tournament schedule.

== Publication history ==
Bob Toole and Steve Thompson designed March Madness which was accepted by Avalon Hill, and the company noted that only 10 percent of the company's games originated with outside creators. It was the first board game based on the NCAA tournament.

== Reception ==
Brian Walker reviewed March Madness for Games International magazine, and gave it a rating of 9 out of 10, and stated that "Don't worry if you, like me, can't tell a basketball from a banana. This game is a great way to start learning."
