= Dana Stabenow =

American writer

- Born: March 27, 1952 (age 74); Anchorage, Territory of Alaska, US
- Education: University of Alaska (BA, MFA)
- Occupation: Novelist
- Writing career
- Period: 1991–present
- Genres: science fiction, children's mystery/crime fiction, suspense/thriller, historical adventure
- Notable awards: Edgar Award, Nero Award
- Website: www.stabenow.com

Dana Stabenow (born March 27, 1952) is an American author of science fiction, mystery/crime fiction, suspense/thriller, and historical adventure novels.

== Biography ==
Many of Stabenow's books are set in her home state of Alaska, where she was raised by her single mother who lived and worked on a fish tender in the Gulf of Alaska, and feature numerous descriptions of Alaska's geography, geology, weather, and wildlife.

Stabenow received a BA in journalism from the University of Alaska in 1973 and, after deciding to try her hand as an author, later enrolled in UAA's MFA program.

Her first novel, Second Star, was bought by Ace Science Fiction in 1990. It was followed by two other science fiction books. Her first Kate Shugak mystery, A Cold Day for Murder, won the Edgar Award for Best Paperback Original in 1993. Her 2011 Kate Shugak mystery, Though Not Dead, received the 2012 Nero Award.

In 2007 Stabenow was named Alaska Artist of the Year in the Governor's Awards for the Arts and Humanities.

In 2011, Stabenow wrote on her blog an informative article about her childhood reading experiences and how these influenced her to write detective novels.

== Books ==
=== Single titles ===
- Blindfold Game (2006)
- Prepared for Rage (2008)

=== Silk and Song trilogy ===
A historical adventure in which protagonist Wu Johanna, the granddaughter of Marco Polo, travels from her home in 14th-century Cambaluc (Beijing) to Europe.

- Everything Under the Heavens (2014)
- By the Shores of the Middle Sea (2014)
- The Land Beyond (2015)
- Silk and Song (2016) - combined edition of all three books

=== Star Svensdotter series ===
Stabenow had three books published in the "Star Svensdotter" science fiction series:

- Second Star (1991)
- A Handful of Stars (1991)
- Red Planet Run (1995)

=== Kate Shugak series ===
The first book in the mystery series, A Cold Day for Murder, won the Edgar Award for Best Paperback Original in 1993. Characters of the series include Kate Shugak, Mutt (her half-wolf dog), Ekaterina, Jack, Jane, and Johnny Morgan, "Chopper" Jim Chopin, and Samuel Dementieff.

- A Cold Day for Murder (1992)
- A Fatal Thaw (1992)
- Dead in the Water (1993)
- A Cold Blooded Business (1994)
- Play with Fire (1995)
- Blood Will Tell (1996)
- Breakup (1997)
- Killing Grounds (1998)
- Hunter's Moon (1999)
- Midnight Come Again (2000)
- The Singing of the Dead (2001)
- A Fine and Bitter Snow (2002)
- A Grave Denied (2003)
- A Taint in the Blood (2004)
- A Deeper Sleep (2007)
- Whisper to the Blood (2009)
- A Night Too Dark (2010)
- Though Not Dead (2011)
- Restless in the Grave (2012)
- Bad Blood (2013)
- Less Than a Treason (2017)
- No Fixed Line (2020)
- Not the Ones Dead (2023)

=== Liam Campbell series ===
In 1998, she began a new mystery series featuring Alaska State Trooper Liam Campbell. In addition to Liam Campbell, the books also feature bush pilot Wyanet Chouinard, Moses Alakuyak, and Bar & Grill owner Bill Billington.

Note: The plots of the Kate Shugak and Liam Campbell Mystery series are interconnected.

- Fire and Ice (1998)
- So Sure of Death (1999)
- Nothing Gold Can Stay (2000)
- Better to Rest (2002)
- Spoils of the Dead (2021)

=== Eye of Isis series ===
Mysteries set in Egypt during the reign of Cleopatra VII.

- Death of an Eye (2018)
- Disappearance of a Scribe (2022)
- Theft of an Idol (2022)
- Abduction of a Slave (2025)

=== Anthologies ===
- The Mysterious North (2002)
- Powers of Detection (2004)
- Unusual Suspects (2008)
- At the Scene of the Crime (2008)

== Storyknife Writers Retreat ==
Stabenow is the founder and the president of the board of directors for Storyknife Writers Retreat, a non-profit organization dedicated to supporting women writers. The organization is named after a tool used by Yup'ik women and girls to sketch images in the ground as they tell stories.

In 2014, Stabenow, along with a board of six additional women, incorporated Storyknife Writers Retreat as a 501(c)(3) non-profit. The organization started offering two to four-week residencies in Stabenow's guest cottage in 2016, and would later complete construction of six cabins on a ten-acre property in Homer, Alaska. Construction was completed in 2020, and though individual writers were able to complete residencies, a public open house was delayed until 2022 because of the COVID pandemic. Since 2021, the Storyknife Writers Retreat has hosted between 48 and 54 women writers annually during its seven-month residency period.
