= Joe Newton (coach) =

American athletics coach (1929–2017)

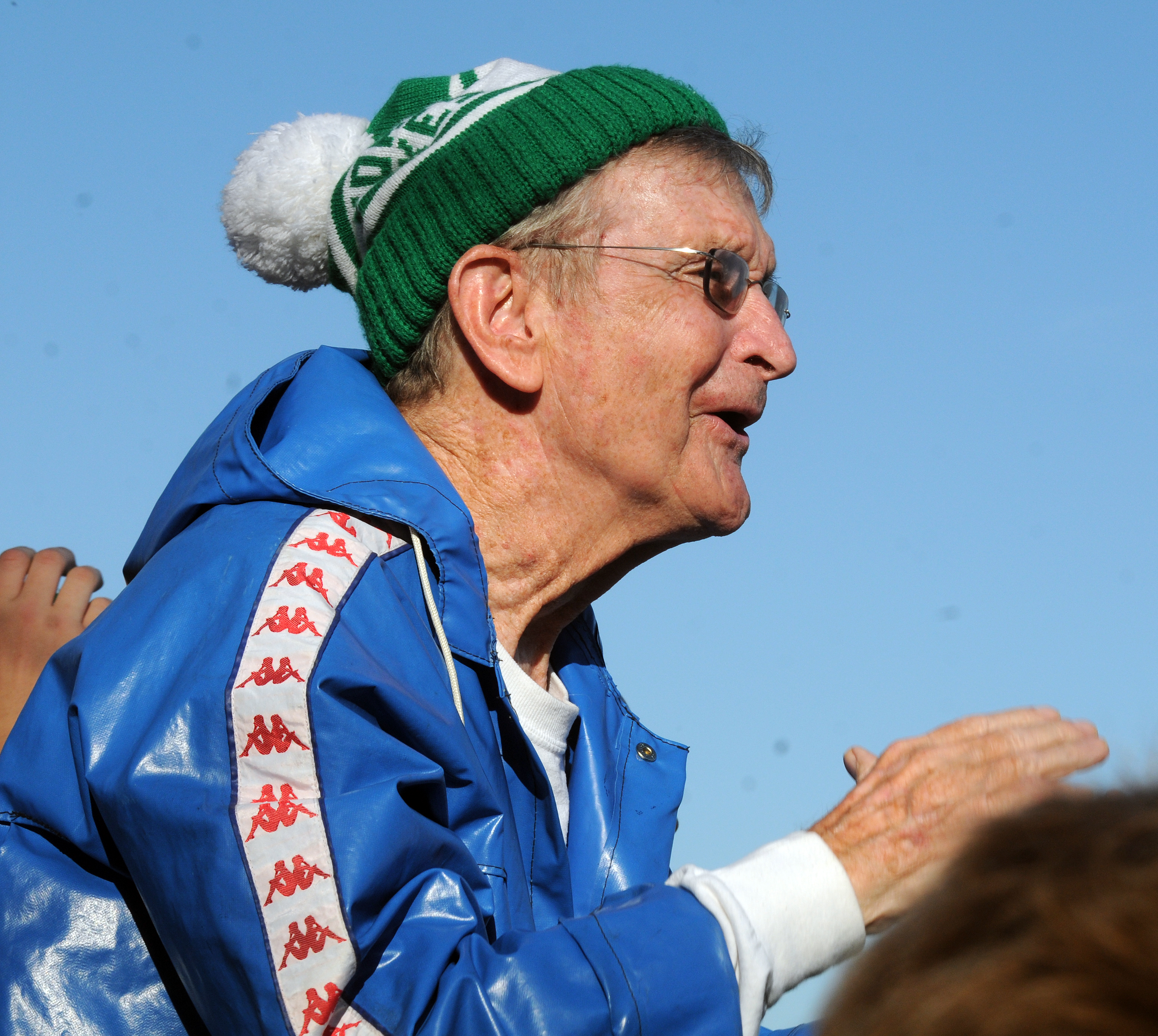
Joe Newton

Joe Newton (April 13, 1929 – December 9, 2017) was a high school cross country and track coach at York High School in Elmhurst, Illinois. In sixty years of coaching between 1956 and 2016, he won 28 Illinois state cross country titles and one track state title. A feature-length documentary was made about his life and successes, called The Long Green Line after his team's nickname. He died on December 9, 2017, aged 88. Among his many accomplishments he was an assistant manager in charge of marathon runners in the U.S. team for the 1988 Olympics. He was the first high school coach to hold such an honor. He was awarded the National Cross Country Coach of the Year four times and wrote four books, concentrating on training and motivation.

== IHSA State Cross Country Meet Results ==
Joe Newton at the IHSA State Cross Country Meet (1960-2016)
Season	Result	Total Titles	Total Trophies
1960	DNQ		
1961	7		
1962	1	1	1
1963	DNQ		
1964	2		2
1965	1	2	3
1966	3		4
1967	3		5
1968	1	3	6
1969	2		7
1970	8		
1971	1	4	8
1972	1	5	9
1973	1	6	10
1974	2		11
1975	2		12
1976	3		13
1977	2		14
1978	1	7	15
1979	2		16
1980	1	8	17
1981	1	9	18
1982	1	10	19
1983	1	11	20
1984	1	12	21
1985	4		
1986	1	13	22
1987	4		
1988	2		23
1989	1	14	24
1990	1	15	25
1991	1	16	26
1992	1	17	27
1993	1	18	28
1994	1	19	29
1995	2		30
1996	5		
1997	2		31
1998	2		32
1999	1	20	33
2000	1	21	34
2001	4		
2002	1	22	35
2003	1	23	36
2004	1	24	37
2005	1	25	38
2006	1	26	39
2007	2		40
2008	2		41
2009	3		42
2010	1	27	43
2011	4		
2012	1	28	44
2013	5		
2014	6		
2015	4		
2016	16		
