= List of United States tornadoes from October to December 2012 =

This is a list of all tornadoes that were confirmed by local offices of the National Weather Service in the United States from October to December 2012.

== United States yearly total ==
Confirmed tornadoes by Enhanced Fujita rating
EFU	EF0	EF1	EF2	EF3	EF4	EF5	Total
0	583	241	94	26	4	0	939

== October ==
Confirmed tornadoes by Enhanced Fujita rating
EFU	EF0	EF1	EF2	EF3	EF4	EF5	Total
0	16	19	2	1	0	0	38

=== October 1 event ===
List of confirmed tornadoes – Monday, October 1, 2012 (Note: All dates are based on the local time zone where the tornado touched down; however, all times are in Coordinated Universal Time for consistency.)
EF#	Location	County / Parish	State	Start Coord.	Time (UTC)	Path length	Max width	Summary
EF0	SW of Pentonsville	Coosa	AL	32.8089°N 86.2405°W	0947–0947	0.52 mi (0.84 km)	150 yd (140 m)	Many trees were downed and a barn and outbuildings were damaged.
EF0	NW of Shelbyville	Bedford	TN	35.49°N 86.49°W	1825–1828	1.51 mi (2.43 km)	50 yd (46 m)	A weak tornado downed several trees and destroyed an outbuilding.
EF0	NNW of Auburntown	Wilson	TN	36.007°N 86.1394°W	2207–2212	1.96 mi (3.15 km)	100 yd (91 m)	A mobile home was moved from its foundation, four outbuildings were destroyed, and aluminum roofing was blown hundreds of yards. Several trees were downed as well. This tornado was the first on record to occur in the month of October in Wilson County.
EF1	NNE of Watertown	Smith	TN	36.1738°N 86.087°W	2231–2234	1.47 mi (2.37 km)	150 yd (140 m)	Numerous trees were downed (some of which were very large and may have been over 200 years old) and the undercarriage of a mobile home was damaged. This tornado was the first on record to occur in the month of October in Smith County.
EF0	Hallsboro	Columbus	NC	34.3277°N 78.5773°W	2122–2123	0.31 mi (0.50 km)	30 yd (27 m)	Several trees were downed and a fence and a corn field were damaged.
EF0	S of Council	Bladen	NC	34.4111°N 78.4724°W	2158–2159	0.14 mi (0.23 km)	20 yd (18 m)	Several trees and power lines were downed.
EF0	SW of Boardman	Columbus	NC	34.3807°N 78.9451°W	2215–2224	2.08 mi (3.35 km)	25 yd (23 m)	A tornado downed numerous trees and ripped the roofs off of three poorly constructed outbuildings.
EF0	ENE of Council	Bladen	NC	34.4358°N 78.4397°W	2218–2230	2.87 mi (4.62 km)	20 yd (18 m)	Large tree limbs were downed.

=== October 12 event ===
List of confirmed tornadoes – Friday, October 12, 2012
EF#	Location	County / Parish	State	Start Coord.	Time (UTC)	Path length	Max width	Summary
EF0	ENE of Glorieta	Santa Fe	NM	35.63°N 105.6684°W	2308–2325	5.78 mi (9.30 km)	75 yd (69 m)	Large pine trees were snapped and a log cabin that was under construction received considerable damage.
EF0	SSE of Hale Center	Hale	TX	33.942°N 101.7959°W	0005–0011	1.8 mi (2.9 km)	200 yd (180 m)	A weak, intermittent, multiple-vortex tornado remained over open land and did not cause damage.
EF0	NE of Hale Center	Hale	TX	34.032°N 101.7027°W	0014–0015	0.14 mi (0.23 km)	20 yd (18 m)	A very brief tornado did not cause damage.

=== October 13 event ===
List of confirmed tornadoes – Saturday, October 13, 2012
EF#	Location	County / Parish	State	Start Coord.	Time (UTC)	Path length	Max width	Summary
EF1	Healdton	Carter	OK	34.1942°N 97.5205°W	2246–2251	5.1 mi (8.2 km)	75 yd (69 m)	A rain-wrapped tornado destroyed five mobile homes and downed trees and power lines. Two people were injured.
EF0	ESE of Lexington	Lee	TX	30.4024°N 96.957°W	2350–2352	0.18 mi (0.29 km)	20 yd (18 m)	Storm chasers observed this brief tornado. A few trees were downed and a house suffered minor roof damage. The damage, however, may have been from a microburst.
EF0	SSW of Willard	Greene	MO	37.2772°N 93.4429°W	0153–0154	0.52 mi (0.84 km)	100 yd (91 m)	Several trees had large limbs blown down, several houses suffered minor roof and siding damage, and a wooden deck was lifted and moved.
EF1	NNE of Cave Springs to NE of Avoca	Benton	AR	36.316°N 94.2055°W	0236–0252	12.5 mi (20.1 km)	450 yd (410 m)	Several office buildings, many homes, and a barn were damaged. Numerous trees and power lines were downed. Two people were injured in a car that was struck by debris.
EF1	NNE of Lucas	Logan	AR	35.0843°N 94.1114°W	0339–0340	0.23 mi (0.37 km)	45 yd (41 m)	A barn was destroyed and trees were damaged.

=== October 14 event ===
List of confirmed tornadoes – Sunday, October 14, 2012
EF#	Location	County / Parish	State	Start Coord.	Time (UTC)	Path length	Max width	Summary
EF1	NW of Mayfield	Graves	KY	36.7354°N 88.6631°W	1142–1144	2.28 mi (3.67 km)	150 yd (140 m)	Two dozen homes and several businesses suffered minor damage, mostly to shingles, siding, and fascia. One business lost part of its roof. Cars were shifted in a parking lot, windows were blown out, and a high school football stadium suffered extensive damage. Trees and power lines were downed as well. One person was injured.

=== October 15 event ===
List of confirmed tornadoes – Monday, October 15, 2012
EF#	Location	County / Parish	State	Start Coord.	Time (UTC)	Path length	Max width	Summary
EF0	SW of Greenwood	Jefferson	AL	33.3076°N 86.9574°W	0518–0519	0.25 mi (0.40 km)	200 yd (180 m)	A brief tornado downed a few trees.

=== October 17 event ===
List of confirmed tornadoes – Wednesday, October 17, 2012
EF#	Location	County / Parish	State	Start Coord.	Time (UTC)	Path length	Max width	Summary
EF0	NW of Seaton	Lonoke	AR	34.6159°N 91.8358°W	2353–2354	0.07 mi (0.11 km)	8 yd (7.3 m)	A brief tornado confirmed by video touched down in an open field, causing no damage.
EF1	Clarendon	Monroe	AR	34.6906°N 91.3159°W	0040–0041	0.39 mi (0.63 km)	350 yd (320 m)	One business in town was badly damaged, and another had windows blown out with the rear part of the building torn off. Two carports were destroyed, one of which was blown into an 18-wheeler. A gas station canopy was damaged, a barber shop had its roof blown off, and a motel canopy was blown away. A boat dock was destroyed and numerous signs, trees, and power poles were downed, knocking out power in Clarendon.
EF2	NE of Shelby	Bolivar	MS	33.9672°N 90.7018°W	0207–0209	1.25 mi (2.01 km)	150 yd (140 m)	One mobile home was destroyed and a few others were heavily damaged. A radio tower and multiple power poles were downed, and several sheds and grain silo were destroyed.
EF1	NNW of Grenada	Grenada	MS	33.859°N 89.8434°W	0312	0.5 mi (0.80 km)	75 yd (69 m)	The roof was torn off a house, a fence was damaged, and trees and tree limbs were downed.
EF2	E of Anguilla to W of Louise	Sharkey, Humphreys	MS	32.9946°N 90.7006°W	0340–0345	4.33 mi (6.97 km)	440 yd (400 m)	Several mobile homes were either destroyed or heavily damaged and dozens of power poles were snapped. Four people were injured.
EF1	SW of Louise	Humphreys	MS	32.9638°N 90.6077°W	0346–0349	1.46 mi (2.35 km)	100 yd (91 m)	Several roofs and outbuildings were damaged.
EF1	SE of Louise	Humphreys	MS	32.9506°N 90.5072°W	0356–0359	1.92 mi (3.09 km)	100 yd (91 m)	Several travel trailers and outbuildings were damaged and trees were snapped.
EF1	W of Pickens	Yazoo	MS	32.8795°N 90.1245°W	0429–0432	1.86 mi (2.99 km)	250 yd (230 m)	Many trees were downed.

=== October 18 event ===
List of confirmed tornadoes – Thursday, October 18, 2012
EF#	Location	County / Parish	State	Start Coord.	Time (UTC)	Path length	Max width	Summary
EF1	W of Carthage	Leake	MS	32.7391°N 89.724°W	0511–0512	0.66 mi (1.06 km)	525 yd (480 m)	A large but brief tornado caused mostly tree damage, although two homes suffered significant roof damage.
EF1	E of Carthage	Leake	MS	32.7495°N 89.5056°W	0532–0534	0.79 mi (1.27 km)	150 yd (140 m)	Several homes and chicken houses sustained significant damage and sheds and outbuildings were destroyed. Numerous trees were downed as well.
EF3	N of Forest to NW of Newton	Scott, Newton	MS	32.4374°N 89.4521°W	0546–0609	14.36 mi (23.11 km)	880 yd (800 m)	The tornado touched downed in Scott County, causing roof damage to a few homes and a small barn. Several trees fell on numerous structures in this area as well. As it moved eastward, the tornado reached its peak strength as many more trees were downed and three large steel transmission towers were bent to the ground. A large shed and a travel trailer were demolished and a mobile home was blown into a road, with the roof and walls being separated from the undercarriage. An outbuilding lost portions of its roof and a small silo was blown over before the tornado crossed into Newton County. Many trees were downed as the tornado passed just south of Conehatta. A small shed and an outbuilding were destroyed, several more homes suffered roof damage, a mobile home was shifted off its foundation, and a barn and a shed had much of their metal roofs removed. Several more trees were downed before the tornado dissipated. One person was injured.
EF1	NE of Bolton	Hinds	MS	32.37°N 90.043°W	0601–0603	0.72 mi (1.16 km)	50 yd (46 m)	One power pole and almost a dozen hardwood trees were snapped. Other trees and tree limbs were downed as well.
EF1	W of Bethsaida	Neshoba	MS	32.66°N 89.07°W	0612–0612	0.64 mi (1.03 km)	150 yd (140 m)	A mobile home was pushed off its foundation, a wood and metal frame building was destroyed, and a well-built home suffered roof damage. Many trees were downed as well.

=== October 19 event ===
List of confirmed tornadoes – Friday, October 19, 2012
EF#	Location	County / Parish	State	Start Coord.	Time (UTC)	Path length	Max width	Summary
EF0	NW of Jarrettsville	Harford	MD	39.609°N 76.504°W	2307–2312	1.2 mi (1.9 km)	100 yd (91 m)	Several trees were either snapped or uprooted. A house suffered roof and gutter damage and had a television antenna blown off. Several other homes sustained shingle and siding damage, with one home having a gazebo lifted and deposited onto the roof.
EF1	SE of Lancaster	Lancaster	PA	39.8022°N 76.2631°W	0000–0025	16.56 mi (26.65 km)	200 yd (180 m)	Discontinuous tornado was embedded in a larger area of straight-line winds. About 50 structures were damaged, with several barns destroyed. 2 to 3 thousand trees were downed as well as two high-tension power poles. 15 people were injured when a pavilion collapsed in the Paradise area.

=== October 22 event ===
List of confirmed tornadoes – Monday, October 22, 2012
EF#	Location	County / Parish	State	Start Coord.	Time (UTC)	Path length	Max width	Summary
EF1	S of Yuba City	Sutter	CA	39.0621°N 121.63°W	2203–2205	2 mi (3.2 km)	100 yd (91 m)	An intermittent tornado hit a golf course, downed trees and fences, and snapped a few dozen walnut and peach trees in an orchard. Four homes sustained roof damage, a small outbuilding was flipped, a carport was damaged, and a boat was blown about 100 feet (30 m). Several doors were damaged at a seed plant, a greenhouse was damaged, and another home suffered shingle damage.
EF1	ESE of Olivehurst	Yuba	CA	39.0791°N 121.5268°W	2230–2231	0.29 mi (0.47 km)	100 yd (91 m)	Several buildings suffered significant roof damage.
EF0	W of Browns Valley	Yuba	CA	39.235°N 121.456°W	2310–2311	0.38 mi (0.61 km)	50 yd (46 m)	A brief tornado touched down in a rice field. No damage was reported.
EF1	SE of Elk Grove	Sacramento	CA	38.387°N 121.35°W	2345–2346	1.02 mi (1.64 km)	100 yd (91 m)	A metal roof was bent back and several large trees were snapped. Dozens of houses were mildly damaged as well.
EF1	NW of Lake of the Pines	Nevada	CA	39.045°N 121.091°W	0028–0030	4.02 mi (6.47 km)	100 yd (91 m)	Many large trees and power lines were downed and a few buildings were badly damaged.

== November ==
Confirmed tornadoes by Enhanced Fujita rating
EFU	EF0	EF1	EF2	EF3	EF4	EF5	Total
0	7	0	0	0	0	0	7

=== November 9 event ===
List of confirmed tornadoes – Friday, November 9, 2012
EF#	Location	County / Parish	State	Start Coord.	Time (UTC)	Path length	Max width	Summary
EF0	S of Tulare	Tulare	CA	36.1104°N 119.2886°W	2055–2058	0.27 mi (0.43 km)	30 yd (27 m)	A weak tornado damaged some corn and tree branches.

=== November 10 event ===
List of confirmed tornadoes – Saturday, November 10, 2012
EF#	Location	County / Parish	State	Start Coord.	Time (UTC)	Path length	Max width	Summary
EF0	Burnsville	Dakota	MN	44.750°N 93.300°W	0458–0501	2.8 mi (4.5 km)	100 yd (91 m)	Numerous trees and power lines were downed, some of which landed on houses. A stop sign was bent over and a grill lid was blown about 200 yards (180 m).
EF0	N of Eagan	Dakota	MN	44.8507°N 93.1744°W	0505–0506	0.5 mi (0.80 km)	50 yd (46 m)	Several trees and power lines were downed, with some trees landing on houses.
EF0	Mendota Heights	Dakota	MN	44.9058°N 93.1247°W	0510–0511	0.54 mi (0.87 km)	50 yd (46 m)	Several large trees were downed, some landing on homes, sheds, and vehicles.
EF0	Mahtomedi	Washington	MN	45.0801°N 92.9605°W	0521–0527	4.33 mi (6.97 km)	100 yd (91 m)	Hundreds of trees were downed, with some landing on homes, sheds, and vehicles.

=== November 11 event ===
List of confirmed tornadoes – Sunday, November 11, 2012
EF#	Location	County / Parish	State	Start Coord.	Time (UTC)	Path length	Max width	Summary
EF0	NNW of Benton	Caddo, Bossier	LA	32.76°N 93.84°W	2315–2331	7.11 mi (11.44 km)	25 yd (23 m)	A weak tornado downed trees and tree branches around the Red River.

=== November 30 event ===
List of confirmed tornadoes – Friday, November 30, 2012
EF#	Location	County / Parish	State	Start Coord.	Time (UTC)	Path length	Max width	Summary
EF0	N of Independence	Inyo	CA	36.9478°N 118.2294°W	2045–2055	1.64 mi (2.64 km)	100 yd (91 m)	A brief landspout with no damage was caught on camera.

== December ==
Confirmed tornadoes by Enhanced Fujita rating
EFU	EF0	EF1	EF2	EF3	EF4	EF5	Total
0	20	23	8	2	0	0	53

=== December 9 event ===
List of confirmed tornadoes – Sunday, December 9, 2012
EF#	Location	County / Parish	State	Start Coord.	Time (UTC)	Path length	Max width	Summary
EF1	N of Flatwoods	Ripley	MO	36.7928°N 90.7268°W	2112–2113	0.4 mi (0.64 km)	150 yd (140 m)	A barn and an outbuilding were destroyed. Square hay bales were blown up to 50 feet (15 m), and tin from the barn was lofted into nearby trees. A house lost a section of shingles and roof decking. Approximately 150 to 200 trees were downed.
EF0	S of Poplarville	Pearl River	MS	30.7625°N 89.5228°W	2150–2155	2.47 mi (3.98 km)	20 yd (18 m)	A weak tornado overturned a swimming pool and damaged a mobile home, a porch, and an outbuilding.
EF0	SSE of Purvis	Lamar	MS	31.0955°N 89.3867°W	2215–2216	0.05 mi (0.080 km)	50 yd (46 m)	A brief tornado peeled off shingles and broke a window in a house. It also downed several trees, two of which fell on vehicles.
EF0	SE of Laurel	Jones	MS	31.6266°N 89.011°W	2320–2321	0.05 mi (0.080 km)	50 yd (46 m)	A brief tornado tore the metal roof off of a building.

=== December 10 event ===
List of confirmed tornadoes – Monday, December 10, 2012
EF#	Location	County / Parish	State	Start Coord.	Time (UTC)	Path length	Max width	Summary
EF1	NW of Downtown Birmingham	Jefferson	AL	33.5359°N 86.8436°W	1043–1045	1.05 mi (1.69 km)	250 yd (230 m)	A large metal building had doors blown in and lost about 25% of its roof. 29 homes suffered mostly roof damage, with two having major damage and another losing its roof completely. A church and two businesses were damaged as well.
EF1	Baker	East Baton Rouge	LA	30.5656°N 91.2045°W	1248–1257	5.42 mi (8.72 km)	100 yd (91 m)	Trees were damaged with numerous softwood trees snapped. Homes and a car wash suffered moderate to major roof damage and a travel trailer was rolled 25 to 30 yd (23 to 27 m) and destroyed. Other structures along the path suffered minor roof damage.
EF1	Dexter area to W of Pickwick	Walthall, Marion	MS	31.01°N 90.18°W	1352–1425	19.17 mi (30.85 km)	100 yd (91 m)	In Walthall County, a metal building and dairy barn were destroyed and homes suffered moderate facade and roof damage. Significant tree damage and minor structural damage occurred elsewhere along the path. Several large hay bales were thrown 75 to 100 feet (23 to 30 m). In Marion County, numerous trees were downed, and a couple sheds and a gazebo were destroyed. Homes suffered shingle damage, a carport was blown into a home, and an antenna was snapped.
EF1	N of Gonzales	Ascension	LA	30.2621°N 90.935°W	1450–1454	1.39 mi (2.24 km)	30 yd (27 m)	The metal roof was torn from a boat dealership, the overhead doors on a fire station were blown out, and a metal frame building was heavily damaged. The windshields of ten cars were blown out and a pickup truck was reported to have been lifted 20 feet (6.1 m) into the air and set back on its wheels. Several residences suffered minor roof damage.
EF1	Lake Apopka	Orange	FL	28.6255°N 81.6247°W	2126–2134	4.18 mi (6.73 km)	50 yd (46 m)	This tornado began as a waterspout that was caught on video moving across Lake Apopka. The waterspout then moved onshore and tracked across the rural Lake Apopka Restoration Area before dissipating.
EF1	SSE of Edgewater	Volusia	FL	28.9112°N 80.8675°W	2225–2226	0.61 mi (0.98 km)	150 yd (140 m)	A high-end EF1 tornado damaged 62 homes, causing major damage to 45 of them and minor damage to the other 17. Awnings, roofs, car ports, and power poles were impacted. Over 100 trees, some very large, were snapped or uprooted. The frame of one mobile home was wrapped around the base of a tree. Two people suffered minor injuries.
EF0	ESE of Edgewater	Volusia	FL	28.9386°N 80.832°W	2229–2230	0.09 mi (0.14 km)	20 yd (18 m)	Power lines were downed and debris from palm trees and shrubs was scattered around the area.

=== December 14 event ===
List of confirmed tornadoes – Friday, December 14, 2012
EF#	Location	County / Parish	State	Start Coord.	Time (UTC)	Path length	Max width	Summary
EF0	NE of Washburn	Carson	TX	35.1941°N 101.5768°W	2217–2222	3 mi (4.8 km)	200 yd (180 m)	A tornado was caught on camera by a storm spotter. No damage was reported.
EF0	SSE of Clarendon	Donley	TX	34.9372°N 100.7865°W	2253–2254	0.95 mi (1.53 km)	50 yd (46 m)	A metal barn had doors blown in and partial roof loss. A small shed was destroyed, an empty diesel tank was blown off of its stand, and shingles were removed from a house.
EF0	NW of Lelia Lake	Donley	TX	34.91°N 100.78°W	2258–2259	0.44 mi (0.71 km)	50 yd (46 m)	Many trees and a fence were downed and two irrigation pipes were moved.

=== December 17 event ===
List of confirmed tornadoes – Monday, December 17, 2012
EF#	Location	County / Parish	State	Start Coord.	Time (UTC)	Path length	Max width	Summary
EF1	E of Alamo	Wheeler	GA	32.1676°N 82.7411°W	1846–1848	0.36 mi (0.58 km)	75 yd (69 m)	Many hardwood trees were downed.
EF0	S of Milan	Telfair	GA	31.9394°N 83.0396°W	1848–1850	1.05 mi (1.69 km)	15 yd (14 m)	A weak, narrow tornado downed several trees.
EF1	E of Scotland	Wheeler	GA	32.0708°N 82.7317°W	1849–1850	0.32 mi (0.51 km)	75 yd (69 m)	A brief tornado caused minor roof damage to one structure and downed about 50 trees.

=== December 19 event ===
List of confirmed tornadoes – Wednesday, December 19, 2012
EF#	Location	County / Parish	State	Start Coord.	Time (UTC)	Path length	Max width	Summary
EF1	NE of Lavaca	Sebastian	AR	35.399°N 94.119°W	0346–0349	3 mi (4.8 km)	650 yd (590 m)	A house, several chicken houses, and a few outbuildings were damaged. A fire station suffered roof and siding damage, the roofs were removed from a mobile home and three chicken houses, and another mobile home was destroyed. Many trees were downed as well.

=== December 20 event ===
List of confirmed tornadoes – Thursday, December 20, 2012
EF#	Location	County / Parish	State	Start Coord.	Time (UTC)	Path length	Max width	Summary
EF1	W of Sheridan	Grant	AR	34.2969°N 92.4480°W	0725–0726	0.64 mi (1.03 km)	200 yd (180 m)	A double wide mobile home was destroyed, the roof of a house sustained heavy damage, and other houses suffered minor roof damage, one of which had windows blown out. Several shop buildings were either damaged or completely destroyed, trees and power lines were downed, and a camper was overturned. One tree fell on a carport, crushing a pickup truck and a car. One person was injured.
EF1	Northwest Mobile/Prichard	Mobile	AL	30.6671°N 88.1383°W	1049–1105	6.67 mi (10.73 km)	75 yd (69 m)	A YMCA sustained roof damage and the baseball field at Davidson High School was damaged. Many homes and businesses were damaged, including major roof loss at these structures. Cars at a Mercedes-Benz dealership were damaged and the regional Red Cross headquarters had damage to the building and numerous vehicles. Many trees and power lines were downed along the path as well. A few very minor injuries were reported.
EF0	NNW of Perry	Taylor	FL	30.1158°N 83.5814°W	2242	0.01 mi (0.016 km)	10 yd (9.1 m)	The Perry Police Department reported a brief tornado; it did not cause damage.

=== December 22 event ===
List of confirmed tornadoes – Saturday, December 22, 2012
EF#	Location	County / Parish	State	Start Coord.	Time (UTC)	Path length	Max width	Summary
EF0	S of Ellicott	Santa Cruz	CA	36.88°N 121.83°W	1459–1502	1.07 mi (1.72 km)	20 yd (18 m)	Tornado began as a waterspout on Monterey Bay. At least five greenhouse structures were damaged, with broken fiberglass panels and bent metal frame poles. Debris from the greenhouses was scattered around the area. Several trees were downed as well.

=== December 25 event ===
List of confirmed tornadoes – Tuesday, December 25, 2012
EF#	Location	County / Parish	State	Start Coord.	Time (UTC)	Path length	Max width	Summary
EF3	W of Pennington	Houston	TX	31.1674°N 95.3132°W	1505 – 1515	9.72 mi (15.64 km)	300 yd (270 m)	An agricultural feed store and a restaurant were completely destroyed, and several homes and trailers were damaged, some severely. Numerous trees were downed as well.
EF0	NNW of Pennington	Houston	TX	31.16°N 95.28°W	1540 – 1541	0.3 mi (480 m)	30 yd (27 m)	Law enforcement observed brief tornado near the site of the previous tornado that lofted debris but did no structural damage.
EF0	N of Slagle	Vernon	LA	31.22°N 93.13°W	1815 – 1817	0.24 mi (0.39 km)	50 yd (46 m)	A brief and weak tornado downed several trees and destroyed a shed.
EF0	E of Pitkin	Vernon	LA	30.94°N 92.89°W	1843 – 1845	2.19 mi (3.52 km)	200 yd (180 m)	Approximately 20 to 40 trees were downed, one of which fell on a mobile home. The roof was partially removed from a barn as well.
EF2	Tioga	Rapides	LA	31.38°N 92.43°W	1845 – 1848	4.62 mi (7.44 km)	500 yd (460 m)	Approximately 43 homes were damaged in the Alexandria suburb of Tioga, with one losing most of its roof. A carwash was destroyed and five trailers were flipped over. At an industrial complex, large doors were blown in and large portions of roofs were peeled off. At Tioga Elementary School, part of the roof was removed from the gym. One person was injured.
EF2	Alexandria	Rapides	LA	31.29°N 92.46°W	1850 – 1851	0.77 mi (1.24 km)	200 yd (180 m)	Many buildings were damaged by this brief, but strong tornado that touched down near downtown Alexandria. Several businesses had their roofs torn off, and many homes and a church sustained considerable roof damage. Many trees were downed as well, some of which landed on homes.
EF1	SW of Jonesville	Catahoula	LA	31.52°N 91.95°W	1919 – 1922	2.55 mi (4.10 km)	300 yd (270 m)	One mobile home was destroyed, and several other mobile homes and sheds were damaged. Two doors were blown off of a warehouse, a porch was ripped from a mobile home, and numerous trees were downed, one of which fell on a house.
EF1	Centreville	Wilkinson, Amite	MS	31.08°N 91.07°W	2031 – 2038	2.75 mi (4.43 km)	250 yd (230 m)	This tornado touched down at the south edge of Centreville and downed several trees and power poles as it moved into town, with one tree falling onto a house and collapsing a wall. A tire service station lost its canopy, and the Centreville Headstart lost a metal awning. It then downed several more trees, with one falling on a car. A mobile home lost its exterior walls and two houses had trees fall on them. Around this time the tornado crossed into Amite County, where it continued east-northeastward and downed many trees. It also caused minor structural damage at one residence, leading to the collapsing of a carport, before lifting. One person was injured.
EF1	W of Dixons Mills	Marengo	AL	32.0238°N 87.8687°W	2115 – 2121	4.7 mi (7.6 km)	100 yd (91 m)	Numerous trees were downed and a few structures suffered minor damage.
EF3	SW of McNeill to McLain	Pearl River, Stone, Forrest, Perry, Greene	MS	30.650°N 89.681°W	2120 – 2234	60.72 mi (97.72 km)	300 yd (270 m)	See section on this tornado – Twelve people were injured; eight in Pearl River County and four in Forrest County.
EF0	N of Basin	Coffee	AL	31.3600°N 86.1300°W	2131	50 yd (46 m)	10 yd (9.1 m)	A very brief tornado downed a few trees.
EF2	NW of Monticello	Lawrence	MS	31.5087°N 90.2377°W	2135 – 2144	8.37 mi (13.47 km)	440 yd (400 m)	This tornado touched down and initially produced minor roof and tree damage. It then moved northeast, damaging a carport awning, and destroying part of a barn. It then destroyed several mobile homes and travel trailers, caused roof and wall damage to a small business, and removed the roof, windows, and awning from an abandoned gas station. The tornado then downed many trees and collapsed the roof of a patio before it lifted. Seven people were injured.
EF1	E of Ovett	Jones	MS	31.4746°N 89.0264°W	2209 – 2211	1.21 mi (1.95 km)	100 yd (91 m)	Numerous trees were downed and a single-wide mobile home had partial roof damage. A small barn sustained collapse of its walls, a small outbuilding was blown over, the roof of another small barn collapsed, and a house had significant roof and siding damage.
EF0	Luverne	Crenshaw	AL	31.7206°N 86.2720°W	2221 – 2223	0.18 mi (290 m)	50 yd (46 m)	A brief tornado damaged the roofs of two houses in Luverne, caused significant damage to a third home, and downed many trees.
EF0	N of Patsburg	Crenshaw	AL	31.7928°N 86.2309°W	2228 – 2230	300 yd (270 m)	20 yd (18 m)	A brief tornado snapped a large pine tree, peeled roofing from a metal building, blew out the windows of two vehicles, and caused significant roof damage to a house.
EF0	S of Meridian	Lauderdale	MS	32.2276°N 88.7153°W	2235 – 2237	2.26 mi (3.64 km)	50 yd (46 m)	Several homes suffered minor roof damage, with another having its tin roof peeled back. A fence was blown over and several trees were downed as well.
EF2	W of Butler	Choctaw	AL	32.0573°N 88.3536°W	2245 – 2256	5.91 mi (9.51 km)	880 yd (800 m)	Three manufactured homes were completely destroyed and several other structures suffered minor to moderate damage, including a mobile home and a site-built house. A couple of barns and outbuildings were severely damaged or destroyed. Many trees were downed along the path.
EF2	Downtown Mobile to Prichard	Mobile	AL	30.67°N 88.09°W	2254 – 2305	5.15 mi (8.29 km)	200 yd (180 m)	See section on this tornado – Several people suffered minor injuries.
EF1	SE of Brundidge	Dale, Pike	AL	31.6180°N 85.7709°W	2327 – 2336	5.41 mi (8.71 km)	300 yd (270 m)	This tornado first touched down in Dale County and downed trees before leaving the county. It entered Pike County where it downed numerous trees, damaged two chicken houses, and caused roof damage to two homes. A barn lost its roof as well.
EF1	E of Demopolis	Marengo	AL	32.4762°N 87.8228°W	2350 – 2359	5.89 mi (9.48 km)	500 yd (460 m)	A cemetery and many mobile homes were damaged, with two of the mobile homes being destroyed. About a dozen homes and a church suffered roof damage, and hundreds of trees were downed.
EF1	S of Deer Park	Washington	AL	31.1929°N 88.3217°W	2353 – 0001	2.18 mi (3.51 km)	110 yd (100 m)	Numerous trees were downed.
EF2	SW of Grove Hill to SW of Camden	Clarke, Wilcox	AL	31.6180°N 87.8672°W	0000 – 0040	29.85 mi (48.04 km)	150 yd (140 m)	The tornado touched down north of Jackson and destroyed a farm outbuilding. It then proceeded northeast and caused significant damage to farm equipment. It also destroyed a grain bin, downed numerous trees, and caused minor structural damage to homes in this area. The tornado continued moving northeast and downed several more trees before nearly falling apart and becoming embedded in a larger microburst. It quickly reformed and moved into Wilcox County, where the tornado downed more trees before dissipating.
EF0	NNE of Damascus to E of Victoria	Coffee	AL	31.3500°N 85.9800°W	0005 – 0033	13.87 mi (22.32 km)	25 yd (23 m)	An intermittent tornado downed several trees, and damaged an outbuilding and a barn.
EF0	S of Marrero	Jefferson	LA	29.8708°N 90.1022°W	0020	0.8 mi (1.3 km)	25 yd (23 m)	A weak tornado caused minor shingle damage to several homes, downed several trees, and either damaged or destroyed a few metal carports. One very large hardwood tree was uprooted and several business signs in the area were downed. It then caused an automobile accident and damaged loose objects and a large door at a home improvement store. A canopy at a fast food restaurant was damaged as well.
EF1	S of Wilmer	Mobile	AL	30.82°N 88.36°W	0122 – 0127	6.65 mi (10.70 km)	100 yd (91 m)	A tractor–trailer was flipped over, a manufactured home sustained minor damage, another manufactured home was destroyed, and the roof of a frame house was damaged. Several greenhouses were destroyed at a nursery and many trees were downed as well. One person was injured.
EF1	S of Fostoria	Lowndes	AL	32.0513°N 86.8505°W	0209 – 0210	2.03 mi (3.27 km)	300 yd (270 m)	Multiple trees were downed.
EF0	SSW of Mosses	Lowndes	AL	32.1521°N 86.6818°W	0226 – 0227	0.62 mi (1.00 km)	75 yd (69 m)	Several homes had minor shingle damage, siding was peeled from an elementary school, and one rotten hardwood tree was snapped.
EF2	NW of Hayneville to WSW of Cantelous	Lowndes	AL	32.2043°N 86.6041°W	0232 – 0246	9.55 mi (15.37 km)	900 yd (820 m)	Hundreds of trees were downed, a large and well-built barn sustained significant damage, a second large barn was mostly destroyed, and numerous power poles were downed. Roofing material was lofted and thrown at least 0.25 miles (400 m), a house lost most of its roof and had cracking of its cement foundation, three to five more homes suffered minor roof damage, a dumpster was thrown about 250 yards (230 m), and several empty semi-trailers were flipped onto their sides.
EF2	NW of Goshen to N of Troy	Pike	AL	31.7252°N 86.1472°W	0424 – 0440	15.7 mi (25.3 km)	600 yd (550 m)	The tornado touched down and initially downed several trees. It then moved northeast and caused significant damage to two chicken houses, a home, and a small barn. It then paralleled the Conecuh River and downed hundreds of trees. The tornado also caused damage to several homes. A single-wide mobile home was ripped from the ground and rolled 75 yards (69 m), with the frame being ripped apart and wrapped around trees. The tornado then intensified and downed many large trees. It also collapsed a portion of the wall of a brick home. It continued to the northwest side of Troy and downed many more trees. The tornado then destroyed three single-wide manufactured homes, one of which rolled into a stand of trees. The tornado then continued over forested and marshy areas before lifting. Two people were injured.
EF1	E of Montgomery	Montgomery	AL	32.3527°N 86.0452°W	0429 – 0430	0.72 mi (1.16 km)	100 yd (91 m)	The tornado caused minor shingle damage to a house and downed approximately 50 trees.

=== December 26 event ===
List of confirmed tornadoes – Wednesday, December 26, 2012
EF#	Location	County / Parish	State	Start Coord.	Time (UTC)	Path length	Max width	Summary
EF1	N of Beaufort	Carteret	NC	34.79°N 76.67°W	1958–2000	0.91 mi (1.46 km)	100 yd (91 m)	Trees and power lines were downed and a couple houses were severely damaged, including window and roof damage.

== See also ==
- Tornadoes of 2012
- List of United States tornadoes from July to September 2012
- List of United States tornadoes from January to February 2013
