= Late December 2012 North American storm complex =

2012 storm in North America

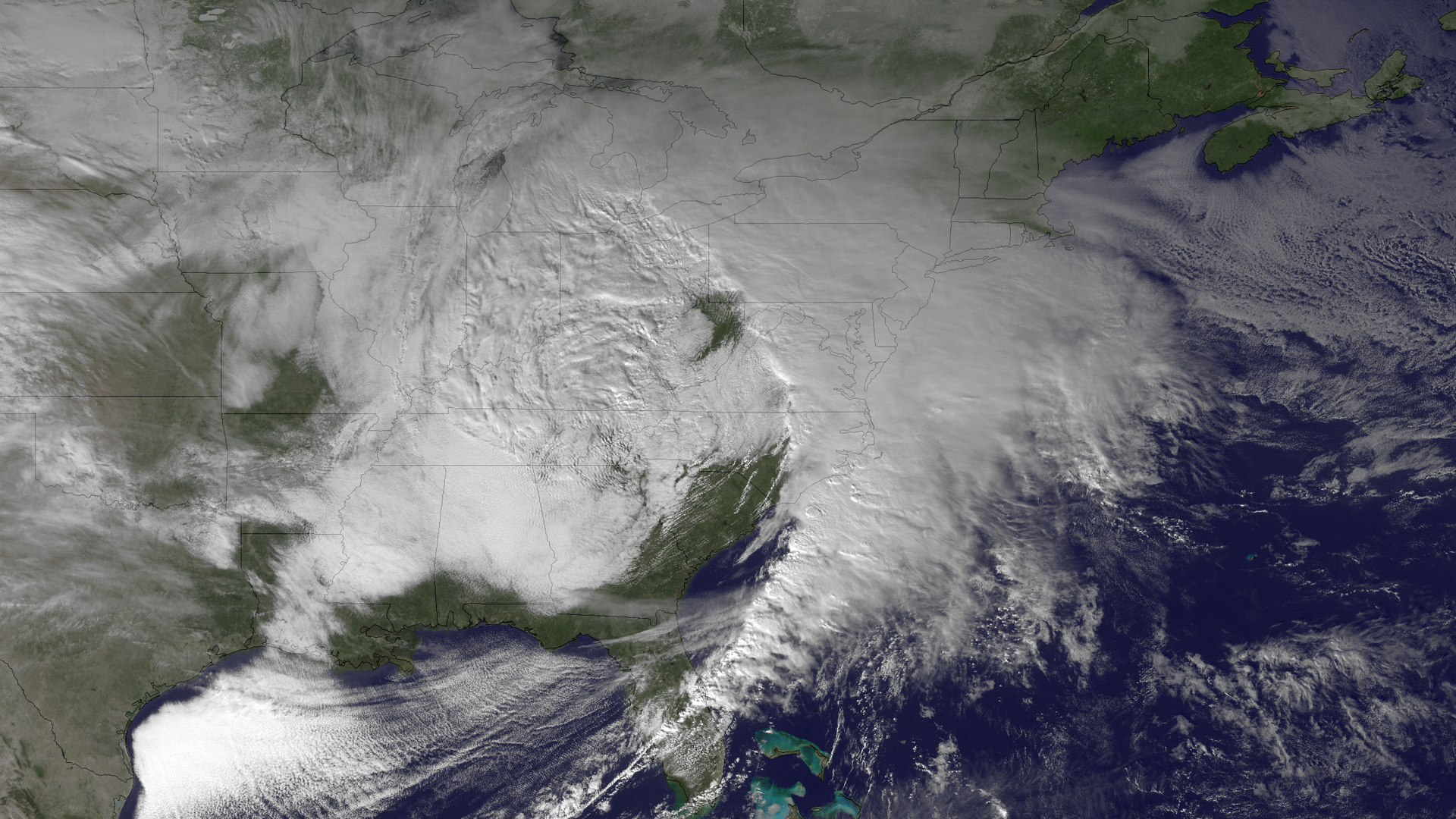
- GOES 13 image of the storm system on December 26

Meteorological history
- Formed: December 17, 2012
- Dissipated: December 31, 2012

Category 1 "Notable" winter storm
- Regional snowfall index: 2.00 (NOAA)
- Largest hail: 1 inch (2.5 cm) in diameter (Three locations in Texas on December 25)
- Max. snowfall: 27 in (69 cm), Woodford, Vermont

Tornado outbreak
- Tornadoes: 31 confirmed
- Max. rating: EF3 tornado
- Highest winds: 150 mph (240 km/h) (Pennington, TX EF3)
- Highest gusts: 74 mph (119 km/h) (excluding tornadoes)
- Lowest pressure: 968

Overall effects
- Fatalities: 16
- Injuries: At least 24
- Damage: >$150 million
- Areas affected: Alaska, Contiguous United States; Western Canada; Eastern Canada; Bermuda; Ireland; United Kingdom
- Part of the 2012–13 North American winter and tornado outbreaks of 2012

Near the end of 2012, a massive storm complex developed that produced both a tornado outbreak and a blizzard across the southern and eastern United States. On Christmas Day 2012 (December 25), a tornado outbreak occurred across the Southern United States. This severe weather/tornado event affected the United States Gulf Coast and southern East Coast over a two-day span. It occurred in conjunction with a much larger winter storm event that brought blizzard conditions to much of the interior United States. In total, 31 tornadoes were confirmed by the National Weather Service in five states from Texas to North Carolina. All but one of the tornadoes that occurred during the outbreak touched down on December 25, with the other occurring the following day in North Carolina. Two of the tornadoes were destructive enough to be rated EF3 on the Enhanced Fujita Scale. At least 16 people died as a result of the related blizzard, and thousands were without power.

There were 63 preliminary local storm reports received for tornadoes, including 60 in four states on December 25 alone. Significant tornadoes included a long–tracked EF3 that moved across areas of Mississippi and an EF2 that moved through Mobile, Alabama. The Mobile tornado damaged many homes, businesses, a hospital, and a high school, with estimated damages totaling $1.35 million.

The storm was unofficially named Winter Storm Euclid by The Weather Channel.

== Meteorological synopsis ==
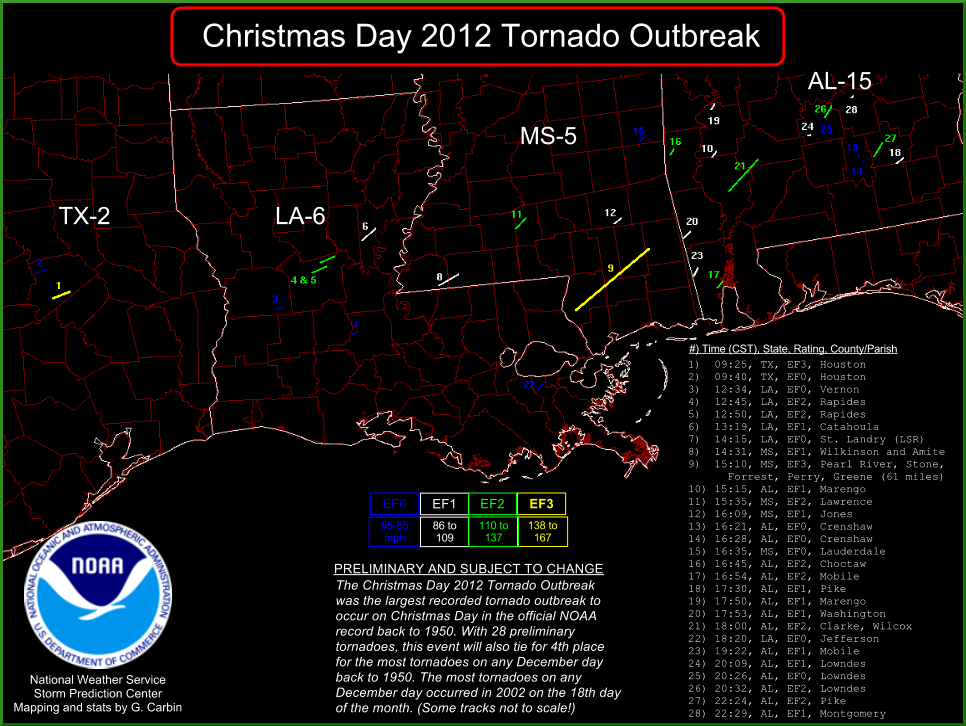
Confirmed tornadoes on December 25, 2012.

On December 24, the Storm Prediction Center (SPC) issued a moderate risk of severe weather, valid for the following day, as conditions became favorable for severe weather. The moderate risk covered an area stretching from west-central Louisiana to west-central Alabama and was expanded south and west on December 25 to include cities such as Port Arthur, New Orleans, and Mobile.

From a meteorological standpoint, the outbreak was caused by a vigorous upper-level trough that moved southeast into Texas from the Rocky Mountains on the evening of December 24, becoming a powerful, negatively-tilted shortwave trough on December 25. In response to the shortwave trough, a surface low formed over south-central Texas by 1200 UTC that morning. Warm, moist air near the surface flowed northward along a warm front extending east from the surface low along the gulf coast on the morning of December 25. Meanwhile, a cold front and dry line had formed to the southwest of the surface low and advanced eastward through the morning, providing a source of lift for convection to form in eastern Texas. Initially, the convection congealed into a quasi-linear convective system while over northeast Texas and western Louisiana, with only a few tornadoes touching down in these areas. Later in the afternoon, enough energy associated with the advancing shortwave trough allowed for the formation of discrete tornadic supercells ahead of the advancing squall line in Louisiana, southern Mississippi, and southern Alabama, and around the same time, the SPC issued a Particularly Dangerous Situation (PDS) tornado watch for extreme eastern Louisiana, southern and central Mississippi, and western Alabama. Southerly winds near the surface increased, providing strong low-level and deep layer wind shear needed for these cells, which would later produce tornadic activity. By late-evening, most storms had congealed into a squall line and weakened due to waning instability.

In the early morning of December 25, a mix of rain and snow began to develop as the upper-level trough began to interact with low-level moisture from the Gulf of Mexico. The system intensified as it moved across the southern plains and into the Mississippi Valley on Christmas Day. The system was able to pull in cold arctic air, causing snow and freezing rain in the south, leading to a rare "White Christmas" event for that portion of the country. As the system moved through the Tennessee Valley overnight into December 26, heavy snow continued in the Ohio Valley. A number areas in the Ohio Valley region, including Dayton, Ohio and Miamisburg, Ohio, and other locations, like Arkansas, also experienced thundersnow. As the day progressed, the system brought snow into the Great Lakes region, and a new low pressure center began to develop in North Carolina. Environment Canada also reported that the system began impacting Ontario that day, bringing heavy snow to the province. The system moved into the Northeast early December 27, with the upper-level trough moving just off the coast of the Delmarva Peninsula. At this point, the storm reached its lowest reported central pressure of 987 mb (29.15 inHg). As the day progressed, the system began to weaken, with the pressure rising, as it continued to move to the northeast, impacting New England, as the system tracked toward the Canadian Maritimes overnight into December 28. That same day, Environment Canada reported heavy and blowing snow over Montreal, Quebec. Early on December 28, the system moved through Nova Scotia, bringing heavy rain and snow before it moved out over the Atlantic Ocean. During the next couple of days, the system slowly moved into the Atlantic Ocean, before accelerating eastward across the Atlantic on December 30. On December 31, the winter storm was absorbed by another extratropical cyclone, just northwest of the United Kingdom.

== Confirmed tornadoes ==
Confirmed tornadoes by Enhanced Fujita rating
EFU	EF0	EF1	EF2	EF3	EF4	EF5	Total
0	10	11	8	2	0	0	31

List of confirmed tornadoes during the 2012 Christmas tornado outbreak (December 25 and 26) (Note: All dates are based on the local time zone where the tornado touched down; however, all times are in Coordinated Universal Time for consistency.)
EF#	Location	County / Parish	State	Start Coord.	Date	Time (UTC)	Path length	Max width	Summary
EF3	W of Pennington	Houston	TX	31.1674°N 95.3132°W	Dec. 25	1505 – 1515	9.72 mi (15.64 km)	300 yd (270 m)	An agricultural feed store and restaurant were completely destroyed, and several houses and trailers were damaged, some severely. Numerous trees were downed as well.
EF0	NNW of Pennington	Houston	TX	31.16°N 95.28°W	Dec. 25	1540 – 1541	0.3 mi (480 m)	30 yd (27 m)	Near the site of the previous tornado, law enforcement observed a brief tornado that lofted debris but did no structural damage.
EF0	N of Slagle	Vernon	LA	31.22°N 93.13°W	Dec. 25	1815 – 1817	0.24 mi (0.39 km)	50 yd (46 m)	A brief, weak tornado downed several trees and destroyed a shed.
EF0	E of Pitkin	Vernon	LA	30.94°N 92.89°W	Dec. 25	1843 – 1845	2.19 mi (3.52 km)	200 yd (180 m)	As many as 40 trees were downed, one of which fell on a mobile home. The roof was partially removed from a barn as well.
EF2	Tioga	Rapides	LA	31.38°N 92.43°W	Dec. 25	1845 – 1848	4.62 mi (7.44 km)	500 yd (460 m)	At least 43 houses were damaged in the town of Tioga, with one losing most of its roof. A carwash was destroyed, and five trailers were flipped over. At an industrial complex, large doors were blown in and large portions of roofs were peeled off. At Tioga Elementary School, part of the roof was removed from the gym. One person was injured.
EF2	Alexandria	Rapides	LA	31.29°N 92.46°W	Dec. 25	1850 – 1851	0.77 mi (1.24 km)	200 yd (180 m)	Many buildings were damaged by this brief, but strong tornado that touched down near downtown Alexandria. Several businesses had their roofs torn off, and many houses and a church sustained considerable roof damage. Many trees were downed as well, some of which landed on homes.
EF1	SW of Jonesville	Catahoula	LA	31.52°N 91.95°W	Dec. 25	1919 – 1922	2.55 mi (4.10 km)	300 yd (270 m)	One mobile home was destroyed, and several other mobile homes and sheds were damaged. Two doors were blown off of a warehouse, a porch was ripped from a mobile home, and numerous trees were downed, one of which fell on a house.
EF1	Centreville	Wilkinson, Amite	MS	31.08°N 91.07°W	Dec. 25	2031 – 2038	2.75 mi (4.43 km)	250 yd (230 m)	This tornado touched down at the south edge of Centreville and downed several trees and power poles as it moved into town, with one tree falling onto a house and collapsing a wall. A tire service station lost its canopy, and the Centreville Headstart lost a metal awning. It then downed several more trees, with one falling on a car. A mobile home lost its exterior walls, and two houses had trees fall on them. Around this time, the tornado crossed into Amite County, where it continued east-northeastward and downed many trees. It also caused minor structural damage at one residence, leading to the collapsing of a carport, before lifting. One person was injured.
EF1	W of Dixons Mills	Marengo	AL	32.0238°N 87.8687°W	Dec. 25	2115 – 2121	4.7 mi (7.6 km)	100 yd (91 m)	Numerous trees were downed and a few structures suffered minor damage.
EF3	SW of McNeill to McLain	Pearl River, Stone, Forrest, Perry, Greene	MS	30.650°N 89.681°W	Dec. 25	2120 – 2234	60.72 mi (97.72 km)	300 yd (270 m)	See section on this tornado – Twelve people were injured; eight in Pearl River County and four in Forrest County.
EF0	N of Basin	Coffee	AL	31.3600°N 86.1300°W	Dec. 25	2131	50 yd (46 m)	10 yd (9.1 m)	A very brief tornado downed a few trees.
EF2	NW of Monticello	Lawrence	MS	31.5087°N 90.2377°W	Dec. 25	2135 – 2144	8.37 mi (13.47 km)	440 yd (400 m)	This tornado touched down and initially produced minor roof and tree damage. It then moved northeast, damaging a carport awning, and destroying part of a barn. It then destroyed several mobile homes and travel trailers, caused roof and wall damage to a small business, and removed the roof, windows, and awning from an abandoned gas station. The tornado then downed many trees and collapsed the roof of a patio before it lifted. Seven people were injured.
EF1	E of Ovett	Jones	MS	31.4746°N 89.0264°W	Dec. 25	2209 – 2211	1.21 mi (1.95 km)	100 yd (91 m)	Numerous trees were downed and a single-wide mobile home had partial roof damage. The walls of a small barn collapsed, a small outbuilding was blown over, the roof of another small barn collapsed, and a house had significant roof and siding damage.
EF0	Luverne	Crenshaw	AL	31.7206°N 86.2720°W	Dec. 25	2221 – 2223	0.18 mi (290 m)	50 yd (46 m)	A brief tornado damaged the roofs of two houses in Luverne, caused significant damage to a third home, and downed many trees.
EF0	N of Patsburg	Crenshaw	AL	31.7928°N 86.2309°W	Dec. 25	2228 – 2230	300 yd (270 m)	20 yd (18 m)	A brief tornado snapped a large pine tree, peeled roofing from a metal building, blew out the windows of two vehicles, and caused significant roof damage to a house.
EF0	S of Meridian	Lauderdale	MS	32.2276°N 88.7153°W	Dec. 25	2235 – 2237	2.26 mi (3.64 km)	50 yd (46 m)	Several houses suffered minor roof damage, with another having its tin roof peeled back. A fence was blown over and several trees were downed as well.
EF2	W of Butler	Choctaw	AL	32.0573°N 88.3536°W	Dec. 25	2245 – 2256	5.91 mi (9.51 km)	880 yd (800 m)	Three mobile homes were completely destroyed and several other structures received minor to moderate damage, including another mobile home and a house. A couple of barns and outbuildings were severely damaged or destroyed. Many trees were downed along the path.
EF2	Downtown Mobile to Prichard	Mobile	AL	30.67°N 88.09°W	Dec. 25	2254 – 2305	5.15 mi (8.29 km)	200 yd (180 m)	See section on this tornado
EF1	SE of Brundidge	Dale, Pike	AL	31.6180°N 85.7709°W	Dec. 25	2327 – 2336	5.41 mi (8.71 km)	300 yd (270 m)	This tornado first touched down in Dale County and downed trees before leaving the county. It entered Pike County where it downed numerous trees, damaged two chicken houses, and caused roof damage to two homes. A barn lost its roof as well.
EF1	E of Demopolis	Marengo	AL	32.4762°N 87.8228°W	Dec. 25	2350 – 2359	5.89 mi (9.48 km)	500 yd (460 m)	A cemetery and many mobile homes were damaged, with two of the mobile homes being destroyed. About a dozen houses and a church suffered roof damage, and hundreds of trees were downed.
EF1	S of Deer Park	Washington	AL	31.1929°N 88.3217°W	Dec. 25	2353 – 0001	2.18 mi (3.51 km)	110 yd (100 m)	Numerous trees were downed.
EF2	SW of Grove Hill to SW of Camden	Clarke, Wilcox	AL	31.6180°N 87.8672°W	Dec. 25	0000 – 0040	29.85 mi (48.04 km)	150 yd (140 m)	The tornado touched down north of Jackson and destroyed a farm outbuilding. It then proceeded northeast and caused significant damage to farm equipment. It also destroyed a grain bin, downed numerous trees, and caused minor structural damage to houses in this area. The tornado continued moving northeast and downed several more trees before becoming embedded in a larger microburst. It quickly reformed and moved into Wilcox County, where more trees were downed before dissipating again.
EF0	NNE of Damascus to E of Victoria	Coffee	AL	31.3500°N 85.9800°W	Dec. 25	0005 – 0033	13.87 mi (22.32 km)	25 yd (23 m)	An intermittent tornado downed several trees and damaged an outbuilding and a barn.
EF0	S of Marrero	Jefferson	LA	29.8708°N 90.1022°W	Dec. 25	0020	0.8 mi (1.3 km)	25 yd (23 m)	A weak tornado caused minor shingle damage to several houses, downed several trees, and either damaged or destroyed a few metal carports. One very large hardwood tree was uprooted and several business signs in the area were downed. It also caused an automobile accident and damaged loose objects and a large door at a home improvement store. A canopy at a fast food restaurant was damaged as well.
EF1	S of Wilmer	Mobile	AL	30.82°N 88.36°W	Dec. 25	0122 – 0127	6.65 mi (10.70 km)	100 yd (91 m)	A tractor–trailer was flipped over, a mobile home sustained minor damage, another mobile home was destroyed, and the roof of a house was damaged. Several greenhouses were destroyed at a nursery and many trees were downed as well. One person was injured.
EF1	S of Fostoria	Lowndes	AL	32.0513°N 86.8505°W	Dec. 25	0209 – 0210	2.03 mi (3.27 km)	300 yd (270 m)	Multiple trees were downed.
EF0	SSW of Mosses	Lowndes	AL	32.1521°N 86.6818°W	Dec. 25	0226 – 0227	0.62 mi (1.00 km)	75 yd (69 m)	Several houses had minor shingle damage, siding was peeled from an elementary school, and one rotten hardwood tree snapped.
EF2	NW of Hayneville to WSW of Cantelous	Lowndes	AL	32.2043°N 86.6041°W	Dec. 25	0232 – 0246	9.55 mi (15.37 km)	900 yd (820 m)	Hundreds of trees were downed, a large and well-built barn sustained significant damage, a second large barn was mostly destroyed, and numerous power poles were downed. Roofing material was lofted and thrown at least 0.25 miles (400 m), a house lost most of its roof and had cracking of its cement foundation, three to five more homes suffered minor roof damage, a dumpster was thrown about 250 yards (230 m), and several empty semi-trailers were flipped onto their sides.
EF2	NW of Goshen to N of Troy	Pike	AL	31.7252°N 86.1472°W	Dec. 25	0424 – 0440	15.7 mi (25.3 km)	600 yd (550 m)	The tornado initially downed several trees, then it moved northeast and caused significant damage to two chicken houses, a small barn, and a house. It then paralleled the Conecuh River and downed hundreds of trees. The tornado also caused damage to several houses. A single-wide mobile home was ripped from the ground and rolled 75 yards (69 m), with the frame being ripped apart and wrapped around trees. The tornado then intensified and downed many large trees. It also collapsed a portion of the wall of a brick house. It continued to the northwest side of Troy and downed many more trees. The tornado then destroyed three single-wide mobile homes, one of which rolled into a stand of trees. The tornado continued over forested and marshy areas before lifting. Two people were injured.
EF1	E of Montgomery	Montgomery	AL	32.3527°N 86.0452°W	Dec. 25	0429 – 0430	0.72 mi (1.16 km)	100 yd (91 m)	The tornado caused minor shingle damage to a house and downed approximately 50 trees.
EF1	N of Beaufort	Carteret	NC	34.79°N 76.67°W	Dec. 26	1958 – 2000	0.91 mi (1.46 km)	100 yd (91 m)	Trees and power lines were downed and a couple of houses were severely damaged, including window and roof damage.

=== McNeill–Maxie–McLain, Mississippi ===
McNeill–Maxie–McLain, Mississippi
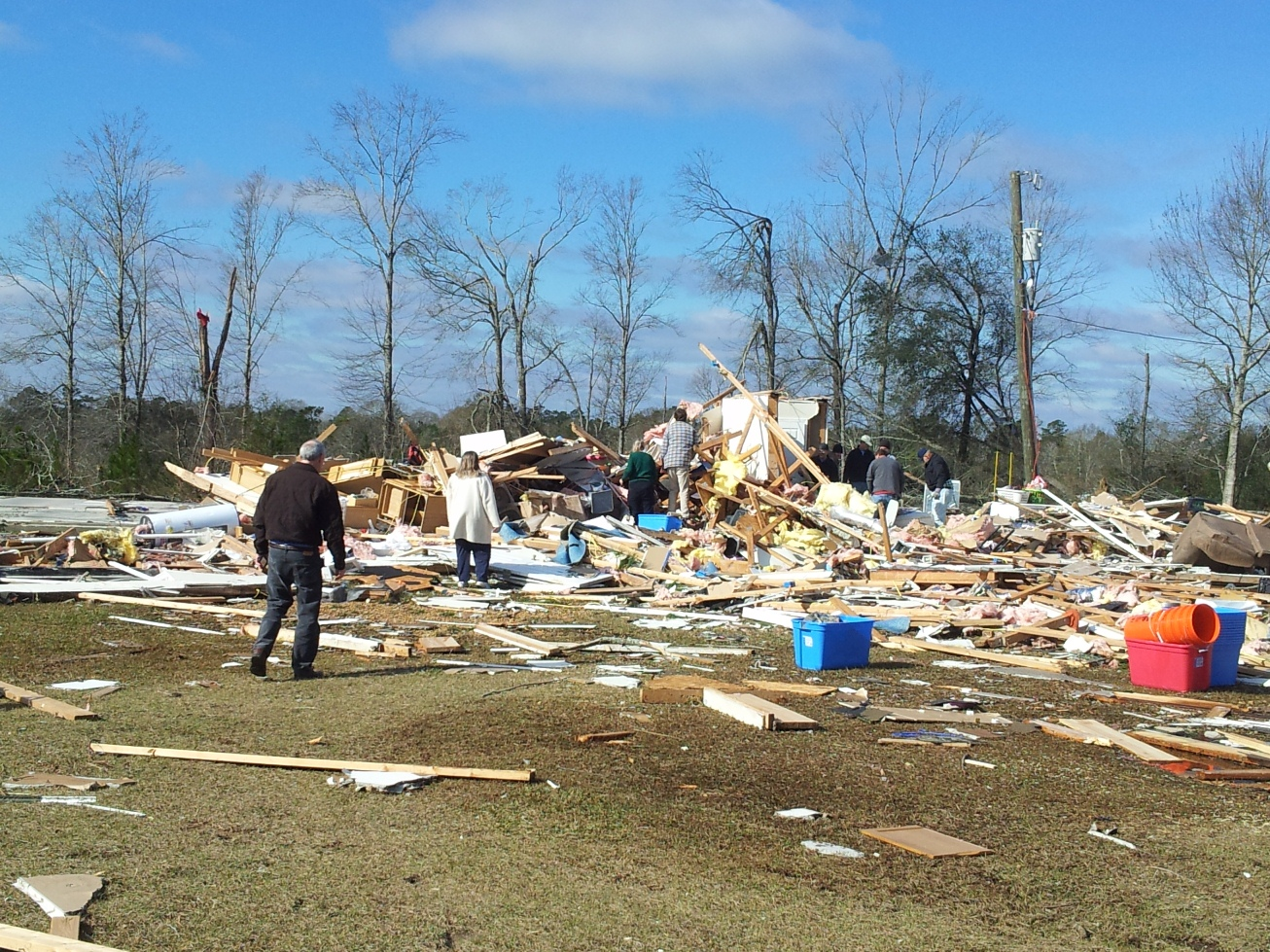
- EF3 damage to a triplex at the north edge of McNeill, MS.

Meteorological history
- Formed: December 25, 2012, 3:10 p.m. CST (UTC–06:00)
- Dissipated: December 25, 2012, 3:35 p.m. CST (UTC–06:00)
- Duration: 25 minutes

EF3 tornado
- on the Enhanced Fujita scale
- Highest winds: 140–150 mph (230–240 km/h)

Overall effects
- Injuries: 12
- Damage: $2.7 million (2012 USD)

This strong and long-tracked EF3 tornado touched down in Pearl River County, just southwest of McNeill where it downed several trees at EF0 to EF1 intensity along Harris Road. It then rapidly intensified to high-end EF2 strength as it impacted the western edge of McNeill, where many trees were snapped and multiple houses were heavily damaged or destroyed. A small house along Joe Smith Road was left with only a few walls standing, and an elderly woman was critically injured inside. A nearby brick house had its roof torn off. A strong velocity couplet and debris ball became visible on Doppler weather radar by this time. The tornado reached its peak strength of EF3 as it crossed Stones Chapel Road at the north edge of town, where it destroyed a single-story brick triplex, with only two interior walls left standing. A nearby house was heavily damaged at EF2 strength, and a few others sustained lesser damage in the area. One house in McNeill that was damaged beyond repair had survived effects from both Hurricane Camille and Hurricane Katrina. It then weakened back to EF2 strength as it crossed US 11, snapping numerous trees and tearing the roofs off of some houses. The tornado weakened further and crossed I-59, moving through unpopulated rural areas southeast of Poplarville, causing EF0 to EF1 tree and outbuilding damage. The tornado then struck a house at EF1 strength near the Stone County line, causing heavy roof damage. Eight people were injured in Pearl River County, 22 houses were destroyed or damaged beyond repair, eight had major damage, 16 had minor damage, and an additional nine were affected in some way. The tornado strengthened to EF2 intensity again as it entered Stone County west of Texas, and caused significant damage to a few houses. Numerous pine trees were snapped at a campground in this area, and a mobile house and several more trees were downed before the tornado moved out of Stone County.

The tornado then moved into Forrest County and produced high-end EF2 damage as it passed near the small community of Maxie, where numerous trees and power lines were downed, two double-wide mobile homes were completely destroyed, a pickup truck was rolled, and a camper was thrown about 50 yards (46 m). Two additional double-wide mobile homes were severely damaged, a single-wide mobile home also sustained major damage, and a falling tree demolished a travel trailer. Four people were injured in Forrest County. The tornado momentarily weakened to EF1 intensity as it crossed into Perry County and moved through portions of the DeSoto National Forest, downing many trees. A house sustained considerable roof and window damage, outbuildings were destroyed, and two cars were moved along this segment of the path. It quickly regained EF2 status as it crossed MS 29 and snapped several wooden electrical transmission poles. The tornado then destroyed a mobile home and a hunting camp before weakening back to EF1 status, damaging a few homes, and downing many more trees. The path length through Perry County was about 20 miles (32 km). The tornado then crossed into Greene County and made a direct hit on the small town of McLain as an EF1, causing roof damage to an elementary school and a few houses. Damage to signs and the siding of a church also occurred. It also downed several trees before lifting as it exited McLain. The tornado tracked for 60.4 miles (97.2 km) across five counties and injured 12 people.

=== Mobile–Prichard, Alabama ===
Mobile–Prichard, Alabama
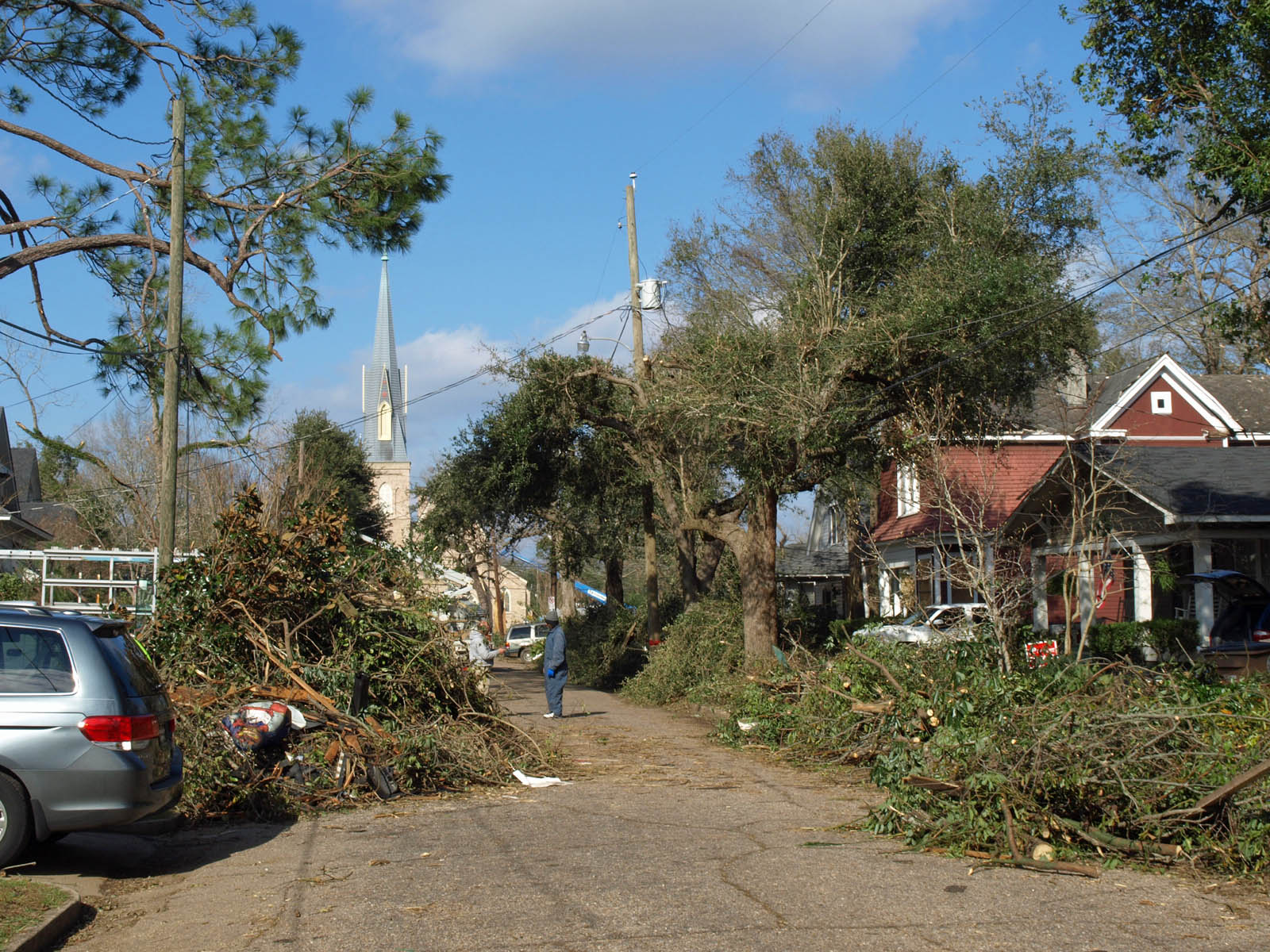
- Tree damage on South Carlen Street in Mobile, Alabama, caused by an EF2 tornado.

Meteorological history
- Formed: December 25, 2012, 4:54 p.m. CST (UTC–06:00)
- Dissipated: December 25, 2012, 5:05 p.m. CST (UTC–06:00)
- Duration: 11 minutes

EF2 tornado
- on the Enhanced Fujita scale
- Highest winds: 111–135 mph (179–217 km/h)

Overall effects
- Damage: $1.35 million (2012 USD)
- Power outages: 23,000

This large, wedge EF2 tornado was broadcast live on local television news tower cameras as it moved through Mobile. The tornado initially touched down at 2254 UTC (4:54 p.m. CST) in the northern part of the Mertz neighborhood of Mobile, just northwest of I-10. The tornado initially produced EF0 damage in neighborhoods along Holcomb Avenue as it moved due north. Damage along this portion of the path consisted of snapped tree limbs, along with minor damage to a fence and a metal building. The tornado began to strengthen and grow in size as it approached and moved through the intersection of Government Street and the Dauphin Island Parkway. EF1 damage occurred in this area as multiple homes sustained roof damage and broken windows, trees and power lines were downed, and several businesses sustained considerable damage. One business sustained outward collapse of an exterior wall, and a brick structure sustained major damage to its second floor. The tornado then reached EF2 strength as it crossed Clearmont Street and struck Murphy High School, which sustained significant damage. Damage at the high school included many broken windows, six portable classrooms being completely destroyed, the roofs being torn off of the auditorium and band building, and other large portions of roof being lifted off the building, only to be deposited back onto the structure. A metal-framed outbuilding was completely destroyed near the athletic field as well. The tornado continued northward and inflicted EF2 damage to several homes and Trinity Episcopal Church. At the church, part of a new slate roof was blown into the parking lot and a large portion of an exterior brick wall was knocked out, leaving a portion of the building visible from the outside. Homes in surrounding neighborhoods had their roofs torn off, large trees were snapped and uprooted, and gas leaks were reported in the area. The tornado widened to its widest point of 200 yards (180 m) along this portion of the path.

The tornado continued to the north at EF2 intensity, ripping roofs off of homes as it crossed Springhill Avenue. By this point, a tornado emergency was declared for areas of Downtown Mobile at 2300 UTC (5:00 p.m. CST) as the large tornado approached those areas, stating Midtown Mobile, Downtown Mobile, and Prichard, Alabama as potentially affected areas. The tornado then weakened slightly to high-end EF1 strength, damaged several more homes, and blew out windows at Mobile Infirmary Medical Center, a hospital of more than 500 beds. Automobiles in the parking lot at the hospital were damaged, with one being flipped. It continued through the Allenville neighborhood, across I-165 and into Prichard. Damage along this segment of the path ranged from mid-range to high-end EF1, as multiple small homes and apartment buildings were damaged, some of which sustained roof loss. It also tossed several shipping containers and damaged a warehouse facility, before producing additional minor EF0 damage in the Plateau neighborhood of Prichard and then lifting. Many trees and power lines were downed along the path, which totaled 5.7 miles (9.2 km). Several people suffered minor injuries. While only existing for eleven minutes, damage estimates to the cities of Mobile and Prichard totaled out at $1.35 million.

The tornado followed a path just east of the weaker EF1 December 20 tornado, which also impacted Mobile.

== Impact ==
=== Southeast and Midwest United States ===
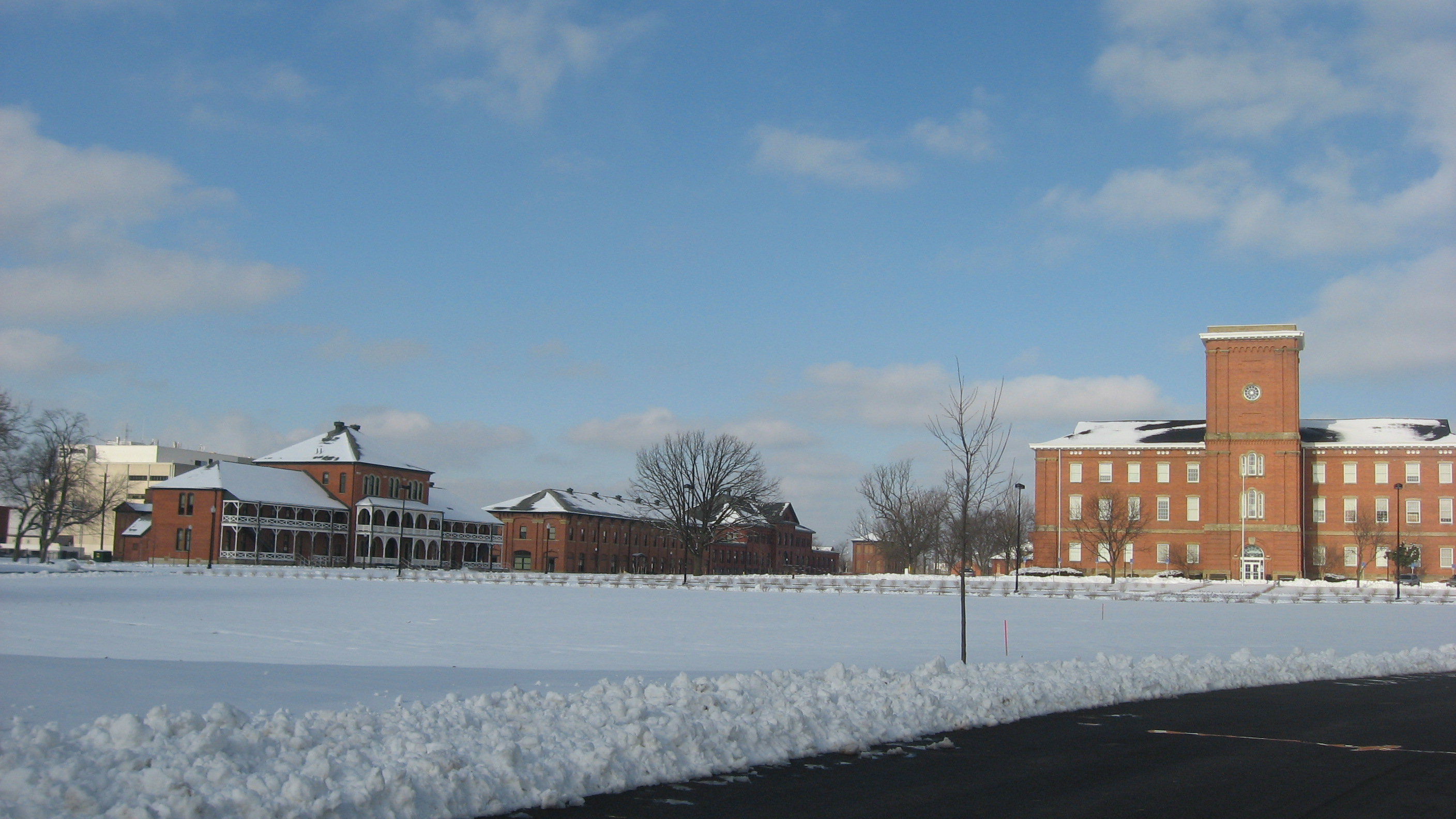
Snow in Columbus, Ohio, on December 28

In Arkansas, two people were killed in a highway accident as a result of sleet on the roads. One person was killed when high winds knocked over a tree onto a house. On December 25, more than 6 inches (15 cm) of snow fell in Oklahoma and the Texas Panhandle. Freezing rain was blamed for a 21-car pileup on Interstate 35 near Oklahoma City. 40 Oklahoma National Guard soldiers were deployed throughout the state to assist motorists on roads. Two people were killed in separate weather-related car crashes. The driver of a truck was killed in Texas when strong winds knocked over a tree, which fell on the vehicle. Two people were killed in separate weather-related automobile accidents in Virginia.

The National Weather Service issued a blizzard warning for southern Illinois, the first blizzard warning in history for the region. Several counties also closed their courthouses due to the snow. Two people were killed in a traffic accident in Indiana caused by snowy roads on December 26, including an 18-year-old Ohio girl that lost control of her vehicle due to poor road conditions and crashed into a snow plow. Due to the snow, a game between the Indianapolis Pacers and Chicago Bulls was postponed until February 4, 2013.

=== Northeast United States and Canada ===
A Southwest Airlines jet slid off its taxiway and got stuck in mud on the morning of December 27. There were no injuries on board, and the passengers and crew all took a later flight to their destination. A man was killed in a car accident while checking on a disabled vehicle along Interstate 78 near Allentown, Pennsylvania. On Wednesday evening, an American Airlines flight that had safely landed at Pittsburgh International Airport ran over a patch of snow on the tarmac and got stuck for approximately two hours. Nobody was injured in the incident.

Over 200 flights were cancelled at Toronto Pearson International Airport. Several pedestrian and car accidents were reported. A record setting 18 inches (46 cm) of snow fell over the Montreal-Laval, Quebec area. The previous record snowfall occurred 41 years earlier in March 1971 when 42 centimetres (17 in) had fallen. Numerous road accidents were reported throughout the province, including a 15-vehicle pileup near Saint-Cuthbert, Quebec.

== Aftermath ==
=== Louisiana ===
In Alexandria, after a relatively short-lived EF2, utility/public works crews and police and fire personnel were dispatched around the city to aid in the cleanup. Within 12 hours of the tornado hitting, nearly 100% of the power had been restored and all streets were clear of hazardous debris.

In Tioga, after another EF2 tornado, neighbors, friends, and family of victims aided in the cleanup across town. Many homes and other structures were damaged and there were many volunteers ready to help victims of the tornado. Power was out in the area for at least two days. A Cenla man partnered with the American Red Cross in an effort to raise at least $10,000 for storm victims across the area.

=== Mississippi ===
Mississippi governor Phil Bryant declared a state of emergency for eight counties in the southern part of the state. These counties were: Pearl River, Forrest, Greene, Hinds, Jones, Lawrence, Wilkinson, and Stone.

Many donations were brought to the McNeill, Mississippi VFD building for victims of the EF3 tornado in Pearl River County. These donations came from citizens and businesses of many surrounding areas, such as Gulfport, Mississippi and Slidell, Louisiana. Items such as toiletries and yard supplies (shovels, rakes, etc.) were provided by the Sam's Club and Tractor Supply stores in Slidell. Many articles of clothing as well as many other supplies were donated as well. In neighboring Stone County, many people pitched in to help with the cleanup in the affected areas. Stone County was affected by the same tornado that hit McNeill.

=== Alabama ===
In Mobile and Prichard, volunteers distributed bottled water, yard supplies, and clean-up kits to people who were affected by the EF2 tornado in that area. Tarps were provided as well for houses that suffered roof damage. Murphy High School students were transferred to nearby Clark-Shaw Magnet School to finish out the school year as repairs were being made to Murphy High. The Salvation Army provided food for more than 1,000 people in Mobile, as well as people affected by the EF2 tornado near Troy.

The Mobile Infirmary was damaged and, with no power, was relegated to using generators. Across the state, 27,600 Alabama Power customers were left without electricity, with approximately 23,000 of those in the Mobile area.

A local block party and concert took place at a school in Mobile on January 4, 2013. Everything for the party, including the food, a bounce house, and the music, was donated. All proceeds went to local Catholic Social Services and the American Red Cross to be distributed to Mobile families to help rebuild after the tornado.

== See also ==
- List of North American tornadoes and tornado outbreaks
- 2010 New Year's Eve tornado outbreak
- November 2012 nor'easter
- December 17–22, 2012 North American blizzard
