= Counsel (disambiguation) =

Counsel may refer to:

- Counsellor at law or counsel, a lawyer
  - Legal counsel
  - General counsel
  - Senior counsel
  - Junior counsel
  - Defence counsel
  - Special counsel
  - Counsel General
  - Crown Counsel
    - King's Counsel (KC) / Queen's Counsel (QC)
- Advice (opinion) or counsel
- Counselor (disambiguation) or counsel
- Counsels (TV series), a British legal drama

== See also ==
- Outline of counseling
- Good Counsel (disambiguation)
- Counselor (disambiguation)
- Advice (disambiguation)
- Help (disambiguation)
- Attorney (disambiguation)
- Barrister (disambiguation)
- Lawyer (disambiguation)
- Solicitor
- Console (disambiguation)
- Consol (disambiguation)
- Consul (disambiguation)
- Council (disambiguation)
