= Con =

Con or CON may refer to:

== Places ==
- Commonwealth of Nations, or CON, an association of primarily former British colonies
- Concord Municipal Airport (IATA airport code CON), a public-use airport in Merrimack County, New Hampshire, United States
- Cornwall, England, Chapman code CON

== Arts, entertainment, and media ==
- Con (TV series), a television show about confidence trickery
- Con Air, a 1997 American action crime film
- Naruto: Clash of Ninja, or CON, a 3D cel-shaded fighting game
- The Chronicles of Narnia, or CON, a series of seven fantasy novels for children written by C. S. Lewis

== Brands and enterprises ==
- Consolidated Edison, also called Con Edison or ConEd
- Continental Oil

== Language ==
- Con language
- Constructed language

== Other uses ==
=== Con ===
- Con (name)
- Confidence trick, also known as con, scam, or flim flam; con is also a person who perpetrates a confidence trick
- Conn (nautical), also spelled con, the command of movement of a ship at sea
- Consider (MUD), the ability to evaluate an opponent in MUDs
- Contact lens, in Hong Kong English
- Convention (meeting)
  - Fan convention, e.g. "Comic-Con"
- Convict, as in con, a person who has been convicted of a crime, or ex-con, a person who has completed their prison sentence
  - Convicted felon, a person who has been convicted of a felony crime in a court of law
- Con, a musical term meaning "with" borrowed from Italian (see Italian musical terms used in English)
- Con, Kakao Friends characters

=== CON ===
- Certificate of Need, or CON
- Commander of the Order of the Niger, or CON
- Cornwall, county in England, Chapman code
- CON, a name not allowed for folders in Microsoft Windows, see List of Easter eggs in Microsoft products#Microsoft Windows.

== See also ==
- Conn (disambiguation)
- Conning (disambiguation)
- Conrad (name)
- Conservative Party (disambiguation)
- Consol (disambiguation)
  - Consolidated (disambiguation)
  - Consolidation (disambiguation)
- Constantine (disambiguation)
- Contra (disambiguation)
- Contrary (disambiguation)
- Counter (disambiguation)
- Khan (disambiguation)
- Kon (disambiguation)
- Qon
- Pro (disambiguation)
- Anti (disambiguation)
