= Council (disambiguation) =

A council is a group of people who come together to consult, deliberate, or make decisions.

Council may also refer to:

== People ==
=== Surname ===
- Brenda Council (born 1955), American politician
- Daron Council (born 1964), American sprinter
- Floyd Council (1911–1976), American blues musician
- Lynn Council (born c. 1933), American mock lynching victim
- Mildred Cotton Council (1929–2018), American restaurateur and cookbook author
- Pamela Council (born 1986), American artist and educator
- Paul Councill (1921–2007), American politician
- Richard E. Council (born 1947), American actor
- Ricky Council IV (born 2001), American basketball player
- Vincent Council (born 1990), American basketball player
- Walter Council (1882–1943), American college football player and physician
- William Hooper Councill (1848–1909), American educator

=== Given name ===
- Council Cargle (1935–2013), American stage and film actor
- Council Julian Dunbar Jr. (1922–2020), American politician
- Council Nedd II (born 1968), Presiding Bishop of the Episcopal Missionary Church
- Council Rudolph (born 1950), former professional American football player

== Places ==
In the United States

- Council, Alaska, an abandoned townsite
  - Council Airport, an airport near Council, Alaska
- Council, Georgia, an unincorporated community
- Council, Idaho, a city in Adams County
- Council, North Carolina, site of Carver's Creek Methodist Church
- Council, Virginia, an unincorporated community in Buchanan County
- Council Bay, Wisconsin, an unincorporated community in La Crosse County

== Other uses ==
- Councils, Plenary, various ecclesiastical synods in the Roman Catholic Church
- Council of Aragon, part of the domestic government of the Spanish Empire
- Council, a former unit of Hololive English

== See also ==
- Councillor
- Privy council
- The Council (disambiguation)
- Console (disambiguation)
- Consol (disambiguation)
- Consul (disambiguation)
- Counsel (disambiguation)
