= Conning =

Conning may refer to:

- Conning (company), a global investment management firm serving the insurance industry
- Conning tower, a raised platform on a ship or submarine from which an officer can give directions to the helmsman
- Rico Conning (1077–2018), producer, songwriter, sound designer, and guitarist

== See also ==
- Conn (disambiguation)
- Con (disambiguation)
- Cons (disambiguation)
- Cheating
