= Christmas week blizzard =

Christmas week blizzard may refer to:

- December 2010 North American blizzard
- Late December 2012 North American storm complex
- December 2022 North American winter storm
