= Contra =

Contra may refer to:

== Places ==
- Contra, Virginia
- Contra Costa Canal, an aqueduct in the U.S. state of California
- Contra Costa County, California
- Tenero-Contra, a municipality in the district of Locarno in the canton of Ticino in Switzerland

== People ==
- Cosmin Contra (born 1975), Romanian football player
- Contra (writer) (real name Margus Konnula; born 1974), Estonian poet and translator
- Contra (rapper) (real name Çağdaş Terzi; born 1989), Turkish rapper and songwriter

== Arts, entertainment, and media ==
=== Games ===
- Contra (card game), an historical German card game also known as Kontraspiel
- Contra (cards), a bid to double the stakes in many card games
- Contra (series), a line of run-and-gun video games created by Konami
  - Contra (video game), the original game, released in 1987

=== Music and dance ===
- Contra (album), the second album by Vampire Weekend
- Contra (band), a band from Cleveland
- "Contra" (song), a song by Logic
- Contra dance, several folk dance styles in which couples dance in two facing lines of indefinite length

=== Film ===
- Contra (film), 2020 German film

== Law and politics ==
- Contra (citation signal), a term used in legal citations
- Contra account, or contra amount
- Contras, Nicaraguan counter-revolutionaries opposed to the Sandinistas
  - Iran–Contra affair, the Reagan administration selling weapons to Iran to fund the Contras

== Musical instruments ==
Several contrabass instruments, including:

- Contra-alto clarinet
- Contrabass bugle, the lowest-pitched instrument in the drum and bugle corps hornline
- Contrabass clarinet
- Contrabass saxophone
- Contrabass trombone
- Contrabassoon, or double bassoon, a larger version of the bassoon sounding an octave lower

== Other uses ==
- Contra (restaurant), a defunct Michelin-starred restaurant in New York City
