= Console =

Console may refer to:

== Computers and video games ==
- System console, a physical device to operate a computer
  - Virtual console, a user interface for multiple computer consoles on one device
  - Command-line interface, a method of interacting with a computer
    - Console applications are programs designed to be used via a text-only computer interface
    - Terminal emulator, a program that substitutes for a computer console or computer terminal
    - Win32 console, the terminal emulator of Microsoft Windows
  - Video game console, a specific device for playing video games
    - Home video game console, a specific home device for playing video games
    - Handheld game console, a specific lightweight and portable device for playing video games
  - Console (Mac OS X), a log viewer on OS X
  - Console (video game CLI), a command-line user interface element for personal computer games originating in Quake
- Console Inc., an American technology startup company
- Konsole, a computer terminal emulator program for the K Desktop Environment

== Music ==
- Console (musician), an electronic music project by Martin Gretschmann
- Console tape recorder, also used for computer tape
- Mixing console, a device for controlling and combining audio signals
- Organ console, which includes the keys, stops, and foot pedals for playing music
- Timpani console

== Other uses ==
- Console (architecture), a support element of a construction such as a balcony
- Console (charity), an Irish suicide bereavement charity which closed due to a mismanagement controversy
- Console (heraldry), a frame supporting a heraldic shield
- Console, a verb describing the offering of consolation
- Center console (automobile)
- Console percussion musket, pattern Jaegerstutzen M1835 rifle from the Habsburgs empire
- Console table, a table supported by corbels designed to be placed against a wall
- Entertainment console, a type of home entertainment center, with various home electronics housed in a self-contained unit
- Lighting control console, a device for controlling theatrical lighting

== See also ==
- Glove compartment
- Consol (disambiguation)
- Consols Consolidated Stock, variety of British government financial bond
- Consul (disambiguation)
- Council (disambiguation)
- Counsel (disambiguation)
