= Atty =

Atty may refer to:

== Slang ==
- Attorney (disambiguation)
- Slang for atomizer, a component of an electronic cigarette
- Slang for Attleborough, Norfolk

== Surname ==
- Alex Atty (1916–1973), American football offensive lineman
- Atty Persse (1869–1960), British racehorse trainer
