= Counselor =

Counselor or counsellor may refer to:

== A professional ==
=== In diplomacy and government ===
- Counsellor of State, senior member of the British royal family to whom the Monarch can delegate some functions in case of unavailability
- Counselor (diplomat), a high-ranking diplomat
- Counselor of the United States Department of State, confidential adviser to the U.S. Secretary of State
- Navy Counselor in the United States Navy
- State Counsellor of Myanmar, former de facto head of government of Myanmar

=== In education and social work ===
- Camp counselor, or "cabin leader", adult supervisor in summer camps
  - Counselor-in-Training, training program for camp counselors
- School counselor, also "guidance counselor" or "educational counselor"

=== Elsewhere ===
- Credit counseling professional help in the US, "debt counsellor" in the UK
- Counselor at law, used interchangeably with "lawyer"
  - Counsel, lawyer in certain jurisdictions
- Mental health counselor
  - Licensed professional counselor
  - Grief counselor

== Arts, entertainment, literature, media ==
- Counselor, a magazine published by the Advertising Specialty Institute
- "Counselor", a song by In Fear and Faith from the album, Imperial
- "Marriage Guidance Counsellor", a Monty Python sketch
- The Counselor, a 2013 American crime thriller film
- De optimo senatore (Latin: The Accomplished Senator; also known as "The Counsellor"), a 1568 book

== Others ==
- Counselor (role variant), a Myers-Briggs Type Indicator personality type
- Institution of the Counsellors, an appointed office in the Baháʼí administration

== See also ==
- Consul (disambiguation)
- Counsel (disambiguation)
