= Attys =

Attys may refer to:

- Attis, a mythological figure
- Plural abbreviation of Attorney
- Slang for atomizer (plural), a component of an electronic cigarette
