= Consol =

Consol may refer to:

- Consol (bond), a type of perpetual bond issued by the government of the United Kingdom; consolidated annuity, consolidated stock
- Consol Energy, an American coal mining company, formerly Consolidation Coal Company
- Consol Energy Center, the home arena of the Pittsburgh Penguins, named after the above coal mining company
- A&M Consolidated High School, a four-year public high school in College Station, Texas
- Consol radio navigation system, A long range radio navigation system for aircraft used 1930s-1991

== See also ==
- Consolidated (disambiguation)
- Consolidation (disambiguation)
- Consolidator (disambiguation)
- Con (disambiguation)
- Console (disambiguation)
- Consul (disambiguation)
- Council (disambiguation)
- Counsel (disambiguation)
