= Kon =

Kon or KON may refer to:

== Places ==
- Koń, Kuyavian-Pomeranian Voivodeship, Poland
- Kon Tum province, Vietnam
  - Kon Tum, the capital of Kon Tum province
- Karkhaneh-ye Sefid Kon, a village in Lorestan Province, Iran
- Kon, India, a town in the Thane district of Maharashtra
- Kon (river), Kazakh Uplands, Kazakhstan

== People ==
=== Given name ===
- Kon, a shorter version of the Greek name Konstantine
- Kon Artis (born 1978), American rapper
- Kon Arimura (born 1976), Japanese radio personality
- Kon Ichikawa (1915–2008), Japanese film director
- Kon Karapanagiotidis, CEO of the Asylum Seeker Resource Centre in Melbourne, Australia
- Kon Knueppel (born 2005), American basketball player
- Kon Sasaki (1918–2009), Japanese photographer
- Kon Vatskalis (born 1957), Australian politician

=== Surname ===
- Kon (surname), list of notable people with the surname

== Fiction ==
- K-On!, a Japanese manga by Kakifly
- Kon (Bleach), a character in Bleach
- Kon Kimidori, a character in Dr. Slump
- Kon-El, the Kryptonian name of DC Comics character Conner Kent
- Kon Kujira, a character from Grojband

== Other uses ==
- Kon (Pre-Incan mythology), a god of rain and wind
- Kon or Bō, a Japanese long staff weapon used in bōjutsu
- Kongo language, a Bantu language spoken in west-central Africa
- KoN or KON, a short form for the Kingdom of the Netherlands

== See also ==
- Con (disambiguation)
- Kawaii Kon, an anime convention in Hawaii
- Kon Kan, a Canadian synthpop band
- Kon Keu language, a Mon–Khmer language in the Palaungic family spoken in China
- Kon Khon, 2011 Thai film
- Kon Kon Kokon, Japanese manga series by Koge-Donbo
