= The Council =

The Council may refer to:

== Organizations ==
- US-ASEAN Business Council, a leading advocacy group for U.S. businesses working in Southeast Asia
- Council of the European Union, main decision-making body of the European Union

== Other uses ==
- The Council, a widely used term in England that refers to the county, borough, metropolitan, etc. responsible for local government in a place.
- The Council (drug syndicate), drug and crime syndicate
- "The Council" (Star Trek: Enterprise), a third-season episode of Star Trek: Enterprise
- The Council (video game), a 2018 adventure game by 'Big Bad Wolf'

== See also ==
- Council (disambiguation)
