= Cons (disambiguation) =

cons is a fundamental function in all dialects of the Lisp programming language.

Cons or CONS may also refer to:

== Science and technology ==
- Connection-Oriented Network Service, one of the two OSI network layer protocols
- CONS, a build automation Make replacement, written in Perl, succeeded by SCons
- Coagulase negative staphylococci (CoNS), a group of round bacteria lacking the enzyme coagulase

== Other uses ==
- Converse (shoe company), an American shoe manufacturer
- Emma Cons (1838–1912), British social reformer, socialist, educationalist and theatre manager

== See also ==
- Con (disambiguation)
