= Kon (surname) =

Kon is a surname in a number of cultures and may refer to:

- Bolesław Kon (1906–1936), Polish concert pianist
- Chiaki Kon, Japanese anime director
- Fabio Kon, Brazilian computer scientist
- Feliks Kon (1864–1941), Polish communist activist
- Fyodor Kon, 16th-century Russian military engineer and architect
- Haruhiko Kon (1910–?), Japanese field hockey player
- Henech Kon (1890–1972), Polish Jewish composer and performer
- Hidemi Kon (1903–1984), Japanese literary critic and essayist
- Igor Kon (1928–2011), Russian philosopher, psychologist, and sexologist
- James Kon, also spelt Kone (born 1987), South Sudanese footballer
- Marko Kon (born 1972), Serbian singer
- Michiko Kon (born 1955), Japanese photographer
- Satoshi Kon (1963–2010), Japanese director of anime films
- Stella Kon (born 1944), Singaporean playwright
- Yōsuke Kon (born 1978), Japanese professional ice hockey player

== See also ==
- Kon (disambiguation)
