= Consolidated Railway =

Consolidated Railway or Consolidated Railroad may refer to:

- Consolidated Rail Corporation, created by the U.S. government in 1976 to take over bankrupt railroads in the northeast U.S.
- Consolidated Railroad of Vermont, predecessor of the Central Vermont Railway
- Consolidated Railway (Connecticut), street railway subsidiary of the New York, New Haven and Hartford Railroad
  - The Consolidated, nickname of the New York, New Haven and Hartford Railroad

== See also ==
- Consolidated (disambiguation)
