= Consul (disambiguation) =

A consul is one of a number of political officials.

Consul may also refer to:

== Politics ==
- Consul (diplomacy), a representative in one country of the government of another
  - Consul general, the head of a consular mission
- Roman consul, the highest elected office in ancient Rome

== Places ==
- Consul, Alabama, United States
- Consul, Saskatchewan, Canada

== Vehicles ==
- Airspeed Consul, a British aircraft
- Ford Consul, a British automobile

== Other uses ==
- Consul (butterfly), a genus of butterflies in the family Nymphalidae
- Consul (software), an open source tool for service discovery and configuration, written by HashiCorp
- Consul, a Brazilian manufacturer of home appliances wholly owned by Whirlpool Corporation
- Consul, a brand used by Czechoslovak company Zbrojovka Brno for computers and computer peripherals
- Organisation Consul, 1920s German Nationalist death squad
- The Consul, a 1950 opera by Gian Carlo Menotti

== See also ==
- Consulate (disambiguation)
- Consol (disambiguation)
- Console (disambiguation)
- Council (disambiguation)
- Counsel (disambiguation)
