= December 17–22, 2012 North American blizzard =

2012 winter storm in United States and Canada

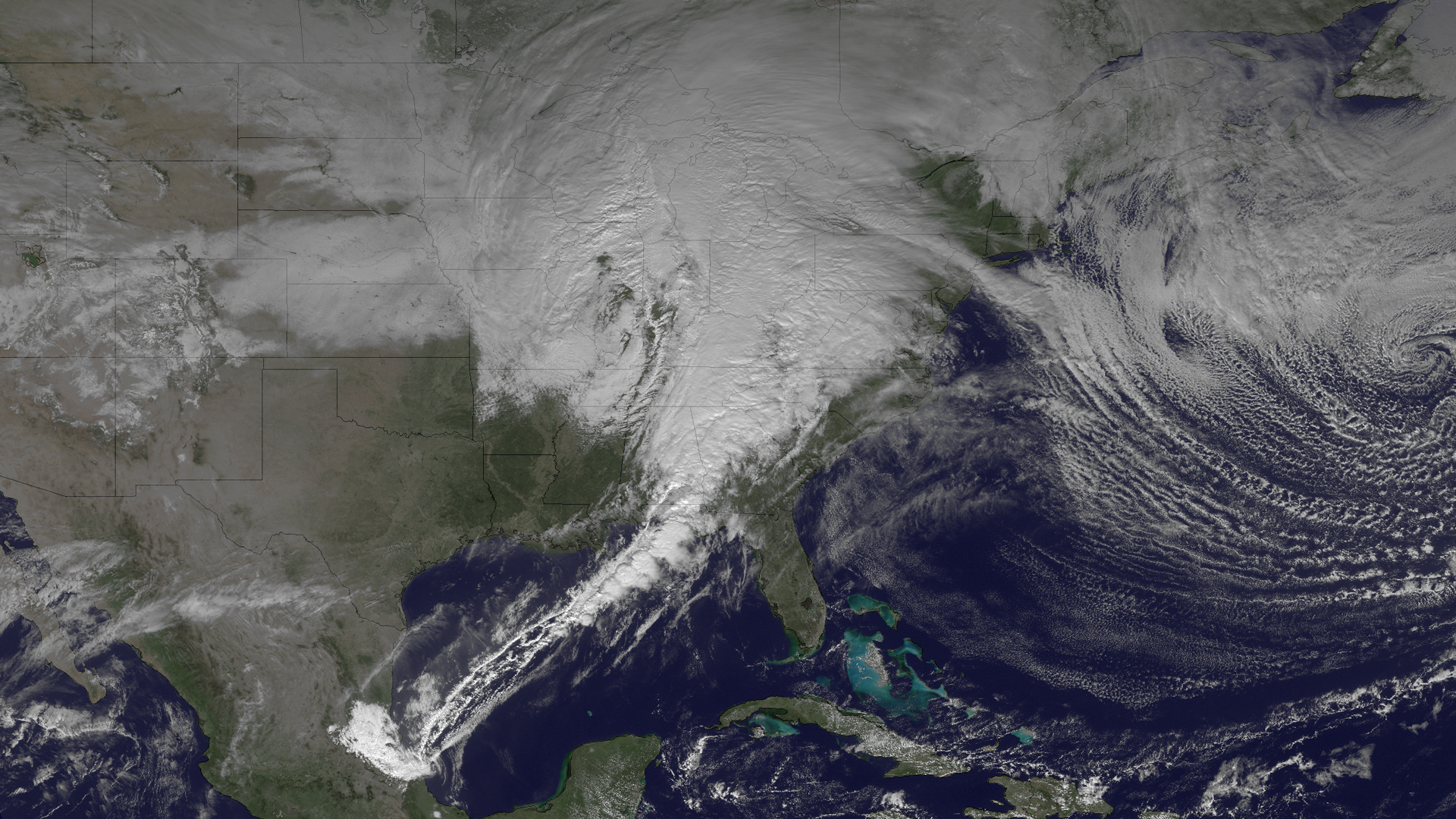
- The blizzard over the Upper Midwest on December 20

Meteorological history
- Formed: December 13, 2012
- Dissipated: December 29, 2012

Category 2 "Minor" winter storm
- Regional snowfall index: 3.35 (NOAA)
- Highest gusts: 50 mph (80 km/h)
- Lowest pressure: 971
- Max. snowfall: 15.2 inches (0.39 m) in Madison, Wisconsin (preliminary)

Overall effects
- Fatalities: At least 6
- Areas affected: Alaska; Contiguous United States; Western Canada; Eastern Canada; Bermuda; Southern Greenland; Iceland
- Power outages: 196,600
- Part of the 2012–13 North American winter

The December 17–22, 2012 North American blizzard was a winter storm that affected the Midwestern and Eastern United States. Forming on December 17, the winter storm moved across the midwest, forcing schools to close throughout the region. Numerous warnings and advisories had been posted by the National Weather Service for many states, including Iowa, Nebraska, Illinois, and Wisconsin. Both O'Hare International Airport and Midway International Airport in Chicago, Illinois canceled most departures and arrivals. According to flight tracking website FlightStats.com, more than 1,000 flights were canceled across the region. More than 130,000 customers were without power across the west and midwest. The storm was unofficially named Winter Storm Draco by The Weather Channel.

In addition to snow, strong thunderstorms and possible tornadoes went across the Southern United States. A multiple-car pileup on Interstate 35 in Fort Dodge, Iowa killed two people, according to the Iowa State Patrol. American Airlines, American Eagle Airlines, and Southwest Airlines collectively canceled a total of 573 flights in the midwest. Greyhound Lines also canceled service in Chicago, Minneapolis, and Indianapolis.

The storm moved east towards the Northeast and New England. Winter storm and blizzard warnings were issued from north New York to western Pennsylvania.

== Meteorological synopsis ==
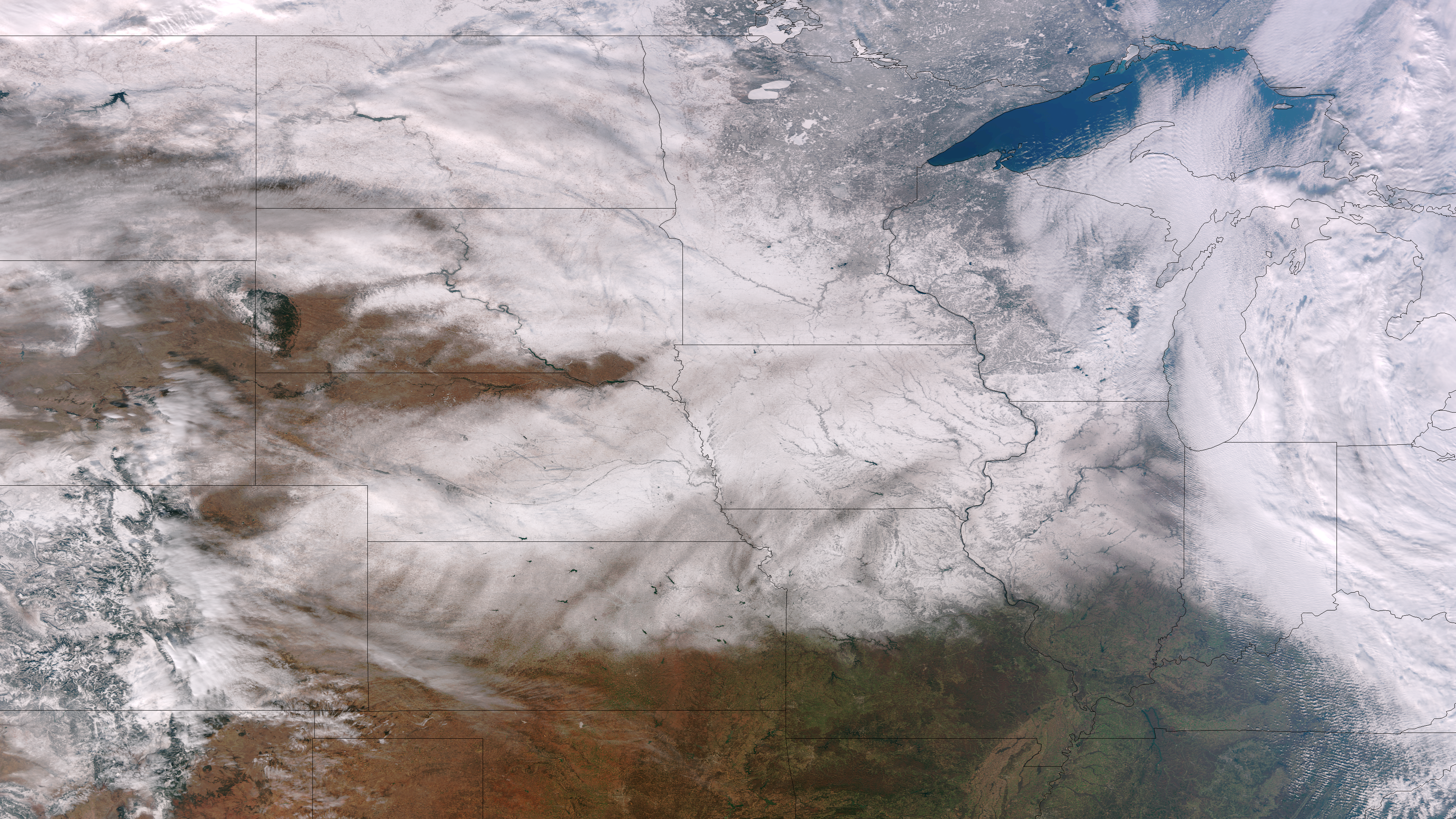
Snowfall over the Midwest on December 21

On December 17, an upper-level shortwave and associated trough made landfall along the coast of the Pacific Northwest. The system initially moved towards the southeast, strengthening over the Rocky Mountains. This led to the development and formation of a surface low over eastern Colorado early on December 19. The low began to curve towards the northeast, and its barometric pressure began to deepen. The low attained its lowest pressure at 1800 UTC on December 20 over northern Illinois. However, the system became occluded, and as such moved quickly to the northeast, where it weakened and subsequently dissipated over southern Ontario late on December 21. Another low pressure area formed in the vicinity of the previous low over the East Coast of the United States, which quickly moved north across the coast, bringing heavy snowfalls to the region. The low later exited the continental United States on December 22. During the next several days, the winter storm drifted northeastward, and eventually to the south of Greenland, before finally being absorbed by another more powerful extratropical cyclone just south of Iceland, on December 29.

== Impact ==
=== Southern United States ===
==== Arkansas ====
A dry line associated with the system moved east across eastern Oklahoma and northwestern Arkansas, helping to trigger thunderstorm and shower development across Arkansas. The thunderstorms produced wind gusts as high as 80 mph (130 km/h), downing trees and power lines. Power outages affected 40,000 people throughout the state as a result of the storms. South of Delight, Arkansas, at least three barns were displaced due to the strong winds. Hail measuring up to 1.25 in (3.2 cm) was recorded in Logan County, Arkansas. In addition, dust from drought-stricken areas was carried aloft into the storm system, falling to the ground and thus coating cars in mud.

One of these thunderstorms also spawned a short lived tornado near Lavaca, Arkansas on December 19. The tornado was rated as an EF1 on the Enhanced Fujita scale, after damaging various trees, homes, and blowing roofs off of structures. A second EF1 tornado was reported 2 mi (3.2 km) west of Sheridan, Arkansas the following day, destroying a mobile home.

==== Alabama ====
Strong storms began to develop and organize ahead of a cold front produced by the winter storm in the early hours of December 20. One of these storms developed off the Louisiana coast, before strengthening and moving ashore in Alabama. The storm developed strong rotation in its updraft and a mesocyclone formed. As a result, the storm spawned a tornado, later rated as an EF1, that moved across areas of northwest Mobile, Alabama. The tornado damaged various homes and businesses in the area. Other storms that formed across Alabama caused power outages to 18,000 people, of which 8,600 people were in Mobile.

== See also ==
- Late December 2012 North American storm complex
- November 2012 nor'easter
