= Consolidator =

Consolidator may refer to:

== Travel related ==
- Airline consolidator, a wholesaler of airline tickets
- Hotel consolidator, a company that buys up blocks of hotel rooms for resale
- Travel consolidator, a company that acts as a consolidator of airline tickets, hotel reservations, and/or car rentals

== Other uses ==
- Consolidator (computing), a linkage editor in computing
- The Consolidator, a fictional adventure by Daniel Defoe published in 1705

== See also ==
- Consolidated (disambiguation)
- Consolidation (disambiguation)
- Consol (disambiguation)
