= Consolidated =

Consolidated may refer to:

== Companies ==
- Consolidated Aircraft, an American aircraft manufacturer active 1923–1943
- Consolidated Communications, an American broadband and business communications provider
- Consolidated Edison, an American energy company that traces its lineage to 1823
- Consolidated Foods, an American food company later known as Sara Lee Corporation
- Consolidated Papers, Inc., an American paper manufacturer active during the 20th century
- Consolidated Railway (disambiguation), several American railroads
- Consolidated Steel Corporation, an American steel and shipbuilding business formed in 1929
- Consolidated Stock Exchange of New York, active 1885–1926

== Other uses ==
- Consolidated (band), American radical activist music group formed in 1989
  - ¡Consolidated!, a 1989 EP by the group
- Consolidated city-county, a form of local government in the United States
- Consolidated financial statement
- Consolidated rental car facility
- Consolidated school or school district; see School district § Districts

== See also ==
- Consolidation (disambiguation)
- Consolidator (disambiguation)
- Consol (disambiguation)
