= Carver's Creek Methodist Church =

Historic church in North Carolina, United States

- U.S. National Register of Historic Places
- Location within North Carolina Location within the United States
- Location: 16904 NC 87 E., near Council, North Carolina
- Coordinates: 34°27′19″N 78°24′30″W
- Area: 3.4 acres (1.4 ha)
- Built: 1859
- Built by: Carter, Levy
- Architectural style: Greek Revival
- NRHP reference No.: 08000365
- Added to NRHP: April 30, 2008

Carver's Creek Methodist Church is a historic Methodist church located near Council, Bladen County, North Carolina. It was built in 1859, and is a frame Greek Revival-style church with a pedimented front portico, and a two-story rear addition. It measures 40 feet across and 60 feet deep.

It was added to the National Register of Historic Places in 2008.
