= Barrister (disambiguation) =

Barrister is a type of lawyer.

Barrister or variations may also refer to:

- Shaun Wallace (born 1960), an English barrister, lecturer, and TV personality also known as "The Barrister"
- Ayinde Barrister (1948 – 2010), a Nigerian musician
- Barrister Baachaa (1941 – 2013), a Pakistani lawyer and politician

== See also ==
- Barristers (Qualification for Office) Act 1961, a now-repealed 1961 law of the United Kingdom
