= Council Julian Dunbar Jr. =

American politician (1922–2020)

Member of the South Carolina House of Representatives for Aitken County
- In office 1971–1972

Personal details
- Born: August 4, 1922 Martin, South Carolina
- Died: September 14, 2020 (aged 98)
- Party: Republican

Council Julian Dunbar Jr. (August 4, 1922 – September 14, 2020) was an American politician in the state of South Carolina. He served in the South Carolina House of Representatives as a member of the Republican Party from 1971 to 1972, representing Allendale County, South Carolina. He was an insurance agent.

Dunbar graduated from Allendale High School in 1941. He played professional baseball with the Miami Seminoles and the Augusta Tigers. He served in the United States Navy during World War II. Dunbar worked with the South Carolina Highway Patrol and was commissioned a lieutenant.
