= Lawyer (disambiguation) =

A lawyer is a person who is learned in the law.

Lawyer may also refer to:

- Lawyer (name), a masculine given name, and a surname
- Lawyer, several species of fish, including the burbot and the puddingwife wrasse
- The Bold Ones: The Lawyers, a US TV drama
- The Lawyer, a magazine
- The Lawyer (film), a 1970 courtroom drama film
