= Consulate (disambiguation) =

A Consulate is a diplomatic mission, the office of a consul.

Consulate may also refer to:

- the office or term of any official styled Consul, originally a magistrate of the Roman Republic
- Consulate of the Sea, a Catalan medieval judicial organ for commerce
- French Consulate, the government of republican France from 1799 to 1804
- a brand of menthol cigarette introduced by Rothmans International

== See also ==
- Consularis, a Latin word derived from Consul
