= Contra (band) =

American metal band

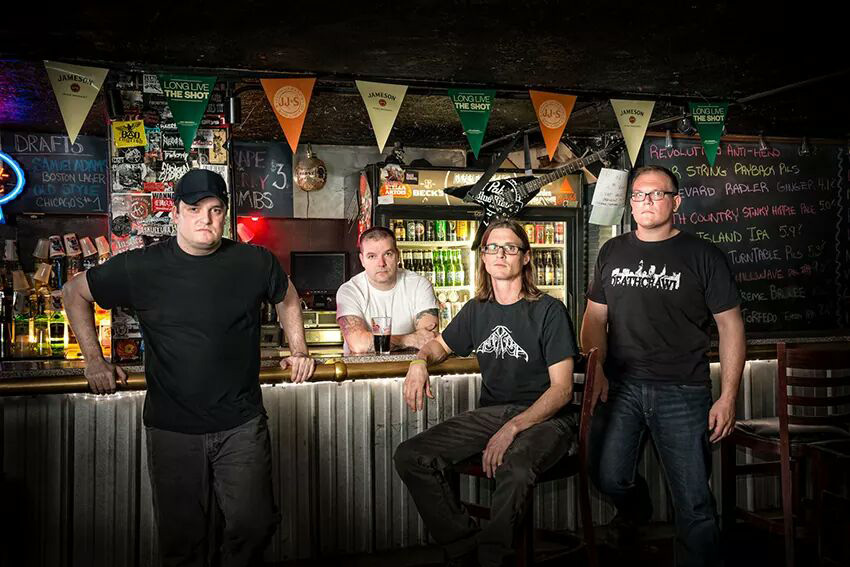
- Contra group photo at Annabell's Bar & Lounge Akron, Ohio

Background information
- Origin: Cleveland, Ohio, United States
- Genres: Sludge Metal
- Years active: 2015-present
- Labels: RobustFellow Productions (Ukraine)] Shifty Records (USA)
- Members: Aaron Brittain, Adam Horwatt, Chris Chiera, Larry Brent
- Website: http://www.contracleveland.com/

Contra is an American sludge metal band from Cleveland.

== Discography ==
=== Albums ===
- Deny Everything (CD) - RobustFellow Productions, Shifty Records (USA), 2017
