= Console Enterprises =

American technology company

- Type: Private
- Industry: Computer hardware; Computer software; Consumer electronics
- Founders: Christopher Price
- Headquarters: Chico, California, U.S.
- Products: ConsoleTab; Console OS
- Website: console.enterprises

Console Enterprises (commonly known as Console) is an American technology company headquartered in Chico, California, that focuses on high-performance Android platform design. It is best known for its Console OS Kickstarter campaign, a project intended on developing a native Android distribution for the PC.

Console was originally titled Mobile Media Ventures, Inc. In mid-2015, the company announced its intention to do business as Console, Inc.

In January 2017, the company rebranded to Console Enterprises, resolving a branding dispute with another company also calling itself Console Inc. That other company renamed itself to Console Connect Inc., and Console Enterprises claims to continue to use Console Inc. as a brand for B2B consulting services.

The company was founded by Christopher Price. It is a privately held startup. The current number of employees in the company is unknown.

== Products ==
=== Console OS ===
Console OS is the first commercial distribution of the Android operating system, designed for traditional PC hardware. It debuted on Kickstarter in June, 2014. The funding campaign was successful, raising $78,497 from 5,695 backers.

The distribution differs from open-source options such as Android-x86 by including commercial, closed-source drivers, codecs, and players. The Console OS platform, effectively, is the Intel Architecture equivalent to CyanogenMod.

Console OS runs as a native operating system. Unlike alternative solutions for the PC, such as BlueStacks, it does not run Android in an emulator. This provides superior performance, particularly on lower-end systems - but with the disadvantage that the end-user must install the operating system, and cannot easily uninstall the software from inside the original operating system.

According to an update on Console OS's Kickstarter page in 2016, Console OS is temporarily offline. Console cited the uncertain future regarding Intel support of Android source code in the open source community until Intel resumes phone development in a couple years. Console says they still plan to ship Marshmallow later this summer, and is focusing on hardware development to adjust to Intel's reduced processor support for Android.

While Intel has discontinued formal support for Android on PC hardware - which Console has repeatedly noted/claimed upstream support a "stated risk" in its risk disclosure section of the Kickstarter - the company has committed to offering backers a courtesy refund as part of their pivot to hardware, once their new products reach general availability.

==== Controversy, Fork from Android-x86.org ====
The initial 2014 releases of Console OS KitKat supported most target Kickstarter devices - but not key/major tablets such as the Dell Venue 8 Pro or ASUS's Transformer Book T100, as it committed to. Releases became stalled. In 2015, the company released a Lollipop preview release, but took it offline citing major issues.

Releases then stalled for most of a year. Later Console announced that Intel had discontinued Android-IA for PC hardware. Console claims this decision was made in January 2015. Console claims at this point it was unable to refund Kickstarter backers, citing that Kickstarter will not reverse payment transactions after 90 days. Despite this, Console said it had a plan to continue development. Later, Console announced that it would fork the Android-x86.org project to continue development.

In December 2015, the creator/administrator of Android-x86.org, Chih-Wei Huang, published an article claiming Console OS "stole" Android-x86.org, and called founder Christopher Price a "cancer" on Android-x86, arguing that a fork could deprive Android.x86.org of community attention.

Console, Inc. responded with evidence claiming that Chih-Wei Huang demanded a payment of $50,000 to collaborate on changes and contributions. Additionally, Console called Chih-Wei Huang's effort a "shakedown" - and responded that his letter was "... unfortunate and it’s a disgrace to open-source."

Chih-Wei Huang later confirmed and admitted that he explicitly demanded the money. Later he claimed that the refusal to donate, and his criticism of Console OS shortly thereafter, were not directly linked.

A technical analysis by the site XDA-Developers's own staff reporters showed that Console was under no obligation to pay funds sought or demanded by Chih-Wei Huang. Its analysis further affirmed that Console OS did not steal Android-x86 and forked it properly, with attribution on its GitHub site.

However, the same analysis by XDA was critical of Console for delayed development, missing certain features, and past failures. It also was critical of Intel for a lack of any public explanation for why Android-IA for PC hardware was discontinued, shortly after Console OS began releasing code based on it.

The controversy received considerable attention on several Android news and open-source community web sites.

=== Other products ===
Console's first product was the iConsole Developer Kit (code-named "Unit 00"). The developer kit was sold from 2013 to 2014. Positioned to be a future-generation Android development system, it was built using PC hardware - but ran Android 4.2 Jelly Bean. It was the first Android device to formally ship with an Intel Core processor, the most powerful Android device sold at its time.

Console announced iConsole micro at Mobile World Congress 2014 in Barcelona, Spain. It was shown under glass at Intel's booth. The company stated they hope to ship it by the end of 2015, and that it intends to be the most powerful Android TV stick on the market.

In August 2016, Console announced that iConsole micro was not going to be launched. No orders or pre-orders were taken for the product. The company has cited Intel's pullbacks/downsizing in Android development as a reason for its discontinuation.

The company announced at the fall 2017 Intel Developer Forum their new product, ConsoleTab, which is based on Intel technology. ConsoleTab's auxiliary battery (a planned feature) was soon removed due to hardware problems in the manufacturing process. As of June 2017, the tablet has not been launched, as Console has cited Intel possibly withdrawing from Android on the processor ConsoleTab depends on.

In 2020, the company announced the iConsole Stage 0, a customized Intel NUC10 featuring Intel Comet Lake CPU, 8GB RAM and 256GB SSD storage. designed as a television and gaming platform with game controllers supplied. It retailed for $799, and adopted the model of Bring your own operating system with the promise of a free operating software in the future.
