= Consolidation =

Consolidation may refer to:

== Science and technology ==
- Consolidation (computing), the act of linkage editing in computing
- Consolidation (locomotive), popular name of a steam locomotive with a 2-8-0 wheel arrangement
- Consolidation (soil), a geological process whereby a soil decreases in volume
- Consolidation ratio, the number of virtual servers that can run on each physical host machine
- Mathematical consolidation, the fusion of diverse theories into one
- Memory consolidation, the process in the brain by which recent memories are crystallised into long-term memory
- Pulmonary consolidation, a clinical term for solidification into a firm dense mass
- Semiconductor consolidation, the trend of semiconductor companies collaborating
- Ultrasonic consolidation, a manufacturing technique for metals

== Economics ==
- Consolidation (business), the mergers or acquisitions of many smaller companies into much larger ones
  - Consolidation (media), consolidation of media into a few companies
- Debt consolidation, the process of combining two or more loans into one big loan
  - Federal student loan consolidation, allows students to consolidate student loans into one single debt
- Fiscal Consolidation, a euphemism for austerity measures

== Other uses ==
- Championship consolidation, the act of combining two separate championships into a single title
- Consolidation bill, a type of bill in the Parliament of the United Kingdom
- Democratic consolidation, the process by which a new democracy matures
- Federal student loan consolidation
- Joinder, the consolidation of multiple legal cases
- Land consolidation, the process that consolidates small fragmented parcels of land into larger contiguous plots
- Likud, a conservative Israeli political party whose name is Hebrew for "Consolidation"
- Municipal consolidation, the act of merging two or more municipalities to form a single new one
- Urban consolidation

== See also ==
- Consolidated (disambiguation)
- Consolidator (disambiguation)
- Consol (disambiguation)
