= Council, North Carolina =

- Unincorporated community
- Location within North Carolina
- Coordinates: 34°25′16″N 78°28′03″W
- Country: United States
- State: North Carolina
- County: Bladen
- Elevation: 69 ft (21 m)
- Time zone: UTC-5 (Eastern (EST))
  - Summer (DST): UTC-4 (EDT)
- ZIP code: 28434
- Area codes: 910, 472
- GNIS feature ID: 983601

Council is an unincorporated community in Bladen County, North Carolina, United States.

== History ==
Carver's Creek Methodist Church, located at Council, is listed on the National Register of Historic Places.

== Geography ==
Council is located in southern Bladen County. The community is adjacent to NC 211, 7.9 miles (12.7 km) north-northwest of Bolton. Council has a post office with ZIP Code 28434.
