= Basin, Alabama =

Unincorporated community in Alabama, United States

- Unincorporated community
- Location within Alabama Location within the United States
- Coordinates: 31°20′30″N 86°07′51″W
- Country: United States
- State: Alabama
- County: Coffee
- Elevation: 344 ft (105 m)
- Time zone: UTC-6 (Central (CST))
  - Summer (DST): UTC-5 (CDT)
- Area code: 334
- GNIS feature ID: 113547

Basin is an unincorporated community in Coffee County, Alabama, United States. Basin is located along Alabama State Route 189, 6.2 miles (10.0 km) southwest of Elba.
