= Mosses, Alabama =

- Town
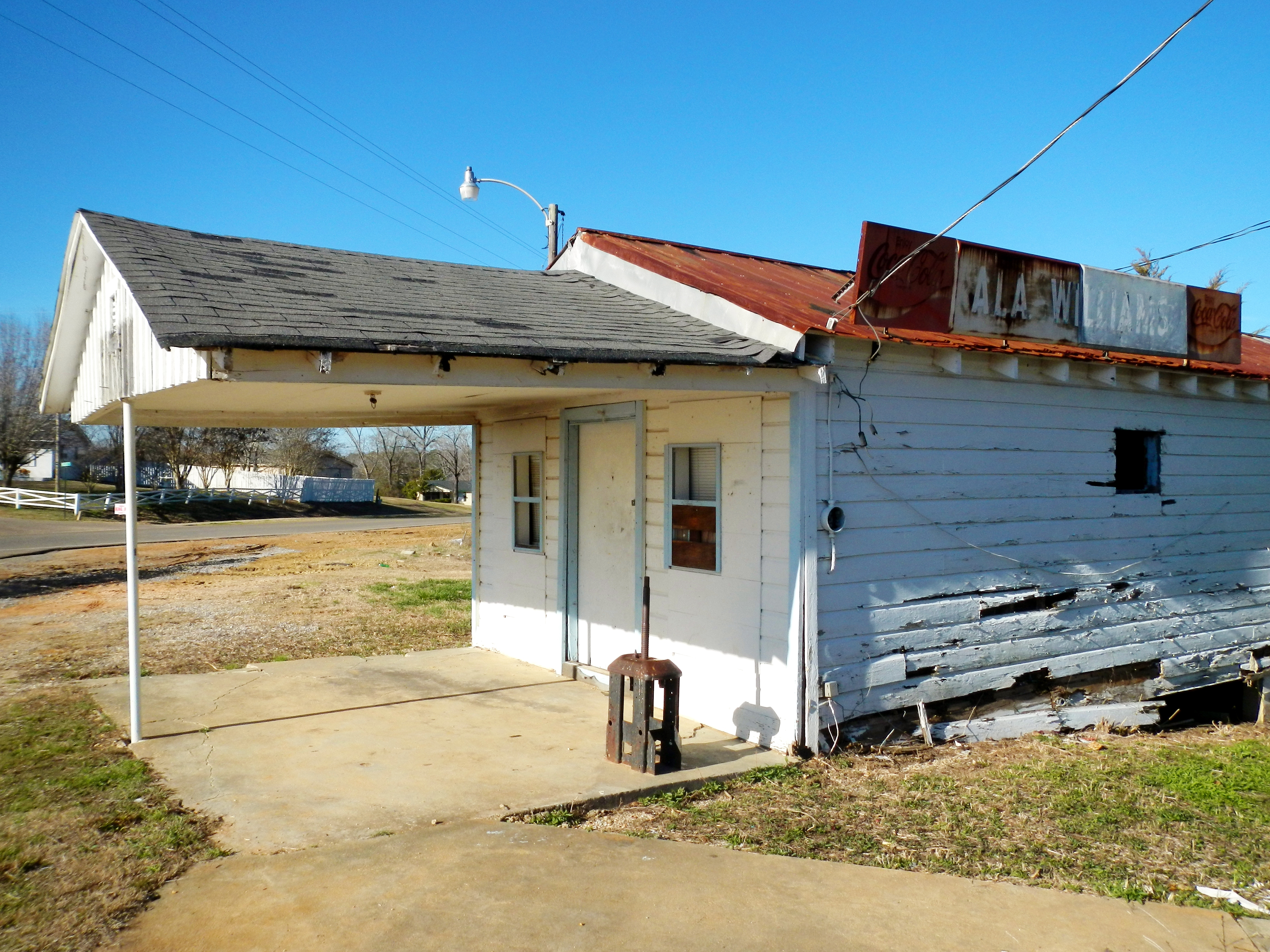
- The Ala Williams Store in Mosses.

- Location of Mosses in Lowndes County, Alabama.
- Coordinates: 32°11′13″N 86°42′51″W
- Country: United States
- State: Alabama
- County: Lowndes

Area
  - Total: 4.78 sq mi (12.37 km^{2})
  - Land: 4.74 sq mi (12.28 km^{2})
  - Water: 0.035 sq mi (0.09 km^{2})
- Elevation: 233 ft (71 m)

Population (2020)
  - Total: 834
  - Density: 176/sq mi (67.9/km^{2})
- Time zone: UTC-6 (Central (CST))
  - Summer (DST): UTC-5 (CDT)
- ZIP code: 36040
- Area code: 334
- FIPS code: 01-51520
- GNIS feature ID: 2406201

Mosses is a town in Lowndes County, Alabama, United States. As of the 2020 census, Mosses had a population of 834. It is part of the Montgomery Metropolitan Statistical Area. It incorporated in 1979.

== Geography ==
According to the U.S. Census Bureau, the town has a total area of 4.8 square miles (12 km^{2}), all land.

== Demographics ==
Historical population
Census	Pop.	Note	%±
1970	158		—
1980	649		310.8%
1990	1,072		65.2%
2000	1,101		2.7%
2010	1,029		−6.5%
2020	834		−19.0%
U.S. Decennial Census; 2013 Estimate

=== 2020 census ===
Mosses town, Alabama – Racial and ethnic composition Note: the US Census treats Hispanic/Latino as an ethnic category. This table excludes Latinos from the racial categories and assigns them to a separate category. Hispanics/Latinos may be of any race.
Race / Ethnicity (NH = Non-Hispanic)	Pop 2000	Pop 2010	Pop 2020	% 2000	% 2010	% 2020
White alone (NH)	13	15	8	1.18%	1.46%	0.96%
Black or African American alone (NH)	1,072	995	804	97.37%	96.70%	96.40%
Native American or Alaska Native alone (NH)	1	0	0	0.09%	0.00%	0.00%
Asian alone (NH)	1	0	0	0.09%	0.00%	0.00%
Native Hawaiian or Pacific Islander alone (NH)	0	0	0	0.00%	0.00%	0.00%
Other race alone (NH)	0	0	0	0.00%	0.00%	0.00%
Mixed race or Multiracial (NH)	9	0	17	0.82%	0.00%	2.04%
Hispanic or Latino (any race)	5	19	5	0.45%	1.85%	0.60%
Total	1,101	1,029	834	100.00%	100.00%	100.00%

=== 2010 census ===
At the 2010 census there were 1,029 people, 369 households, and 270 families in the town. The population density was 214.4 inhabitants per square mile (82.8/km^{2}). There were 409 housing units at an average density of 85.2 per square mile (32.9/km^{2}). The racial makeup of the town was 97.9% Black or African American, 1.5% White, 0.0% Native American, 0.0% Asian, and 0.1% from two or more races. 1.8% of the population were Hispanic or Latino of any race. Of the 369 households 23.8% had children under the age of 18 living with them, 24.1% were married couples living together, 42.5% had a female householder with no husband present, and 26.8% were non-families. 25.5% of households were one person and 6.5% were one person aged 65 or older. The average household size was 2.79 and the average family size was 3.38.

The age distribution was 26.7% under the age of 18, 11.4% from 18 to 24, 25.3% from 25 to 44, 26.4% from 45 to 64, and 10.2% 65 or older. The median age was 34.7 years. For every 100 females, there were 86.8 males. For every 100 females age 18 and over, there were 88.1 males.

The median household income was $13,750 and the median family income was $16,319. Males had a median income of $19,583 versus $25,833 for females. The per capita income for the town was $8,053. About 53.4% of families and 55.4% of the population were below the poverty line, including 65.1% of those under age 18 and 51.1% of those age 65 or over.

=== 2000 census ===
At the 2000 census there were 1,101 people, 364 households, and 281 families in the town. The population density was 230.1 inhabitants per square mile (88.8/km^{2}). There were 421 housing units at an average density of 88.0 per square mile (34.0/km^{2}). The racial makeup of the town was 97.82% Black or African American, 1.18% White, 0.09% Native American, 0.09% Asian, and 0.82% from two or more races. 0.45% of the population were Hispanic or Latino of any race. Of the 364 households 44.8% had children under the age of 18 living with them, 25.5% were married couples living together, 45.6% had a female householder with no husband present, and 22.8% were non-families. 20.6% of households were one person and 3.6% were one person aged 65 or older. The average household size was 3.02 and the average family size was 3.50.

The age distribution was 34.6% under the age of 18, 12.9% from 18 to 24, 27.2% from 25 to 44, 17.2% from 45 to 64, and 8.2% 65 or older. The median age was 27 years. For every 100 females, there were 84.1 males. For every 100 females age 18 and over, there were 74.8 males.

The median household income was $17,031 and the median family income was $22,273. Males had a median income of $21,528 versus $16,771 for females. The per capita income for the town was $8,268. About 39.0% of families and 43.0% of the population were below the poverty line, including 54.4% of those under age 18 and 35.9% of those age 65 or over.
