= McNeill, Mississippi =

- Unincorporated community
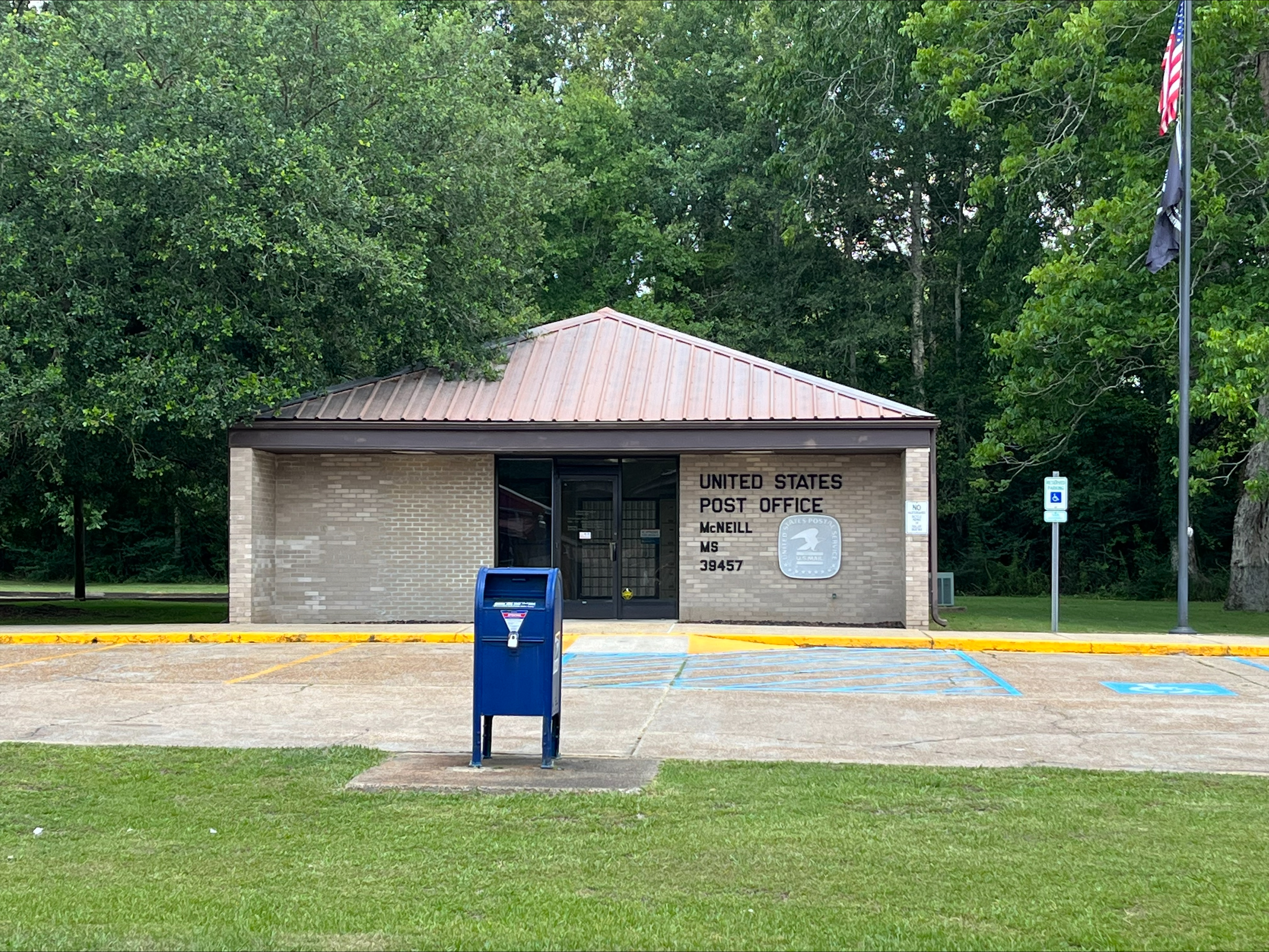
- McNeill Post Office

- Location within Mississippi Location within the United States
- Coordinates: 30°40′08″N 89°38′18″W
- Country: United States
- State: Mississippi
- County: Pearl River
- Elevation: 243 ft (74 m)
- Time zone: UTC-6 (Central (CST))
  - Summer (DST): UTC-5 (CDT)
- ZIP code: 39457
- Area codes: 601 & 769
- GNIS feature ID: 673420

McNeill, Mississippi is an unincorporated community in Pearl River County, Mississippi, United States. The zip code is: 39457.

McNeill is located on the Norfolk Southern Railway and was named by William Graham for a family who moved to the area from North Carolina to operate a turpentine business.

In 1906, McNeill had an estimated population of 250.

Mississippi State University operates the McNeill Research Unit in McNeill. The unit conducts experiments on muscadine growth and Formosan termites in addition to silvopasture research.

Donna Pope of McNeill was crowned Miss Mississippi in 1980, and was second runner-up at the Miss America Pageant.
