= Conn =

Conn may refer to:

- Conn (name), a family name and a masculine given name
  - Conn, son of Ler from the Children of Lir legend in Irish mythology
  - Conn of the Hundred Battles, a figure from Irish mythology
  - Jerome W. Conn, American endocrinologist
- Connecticut, State in the northeastern United States
  - Connecticut College, a liberal arts college in New London, Connecticut, USA
- Conn, Mississippi, United States
- Conn, Ontario, Canada
- Conn (nautical), the duty of giving directions for movement from the deck of a ship to the helm
- C.G. Conn, Inc., a manufacturer of musical instruments
- CONN (functional connectivity toolbox), a cross-platform imaging software program
- Lough Conn, a lake in County Mayo, Ireland
