= Damascus, Alabama =

Unincorporated community in Alabama, United States

- Unincorporated community
- Location in Alabama.
- Coordinates: 33°58′29″N 86°52′29″W
- Country: United States
- State: Alabama
- County: Cullman
- Elevation: 495 ft (151 m)
- Time zone: UTC-6 (Central (CST))
  - Summer (DST): UTC-5 (CDT)
- ZIP code: 36323
- Area code: Area code 334
- GNIS feature ID: 1844226

Damascus is an unincorporated community in Cullman County, Alabama, United States.
