= Pennington, Texas =

- Unincorporated community
- Location within Texas Location within the United States
- Coordinates: 31°11′29″N 95°14′08″W
- Country: United States
- State: Texas
- County: Houston and Trinity
- Elevation: 345 ft (105 m)

Population (2021)
  - Total: 173
- Time zone: UTC-6 (Central (CST))
  - Summer (DST): UTC-5 (CDT)
- ZIP codes: 75856
- Area code: 936
- GNIS feature ID: 1382475

Pennington is an unincorporated community primarily in Trinity county in the U.S. state of Texas. Originally in Trinity County, by the 1990s part of Pennington extended to Houston County. Although it is unincorporated, it has a post office with a zip code of 75856. Its population as of 2021 is 173.

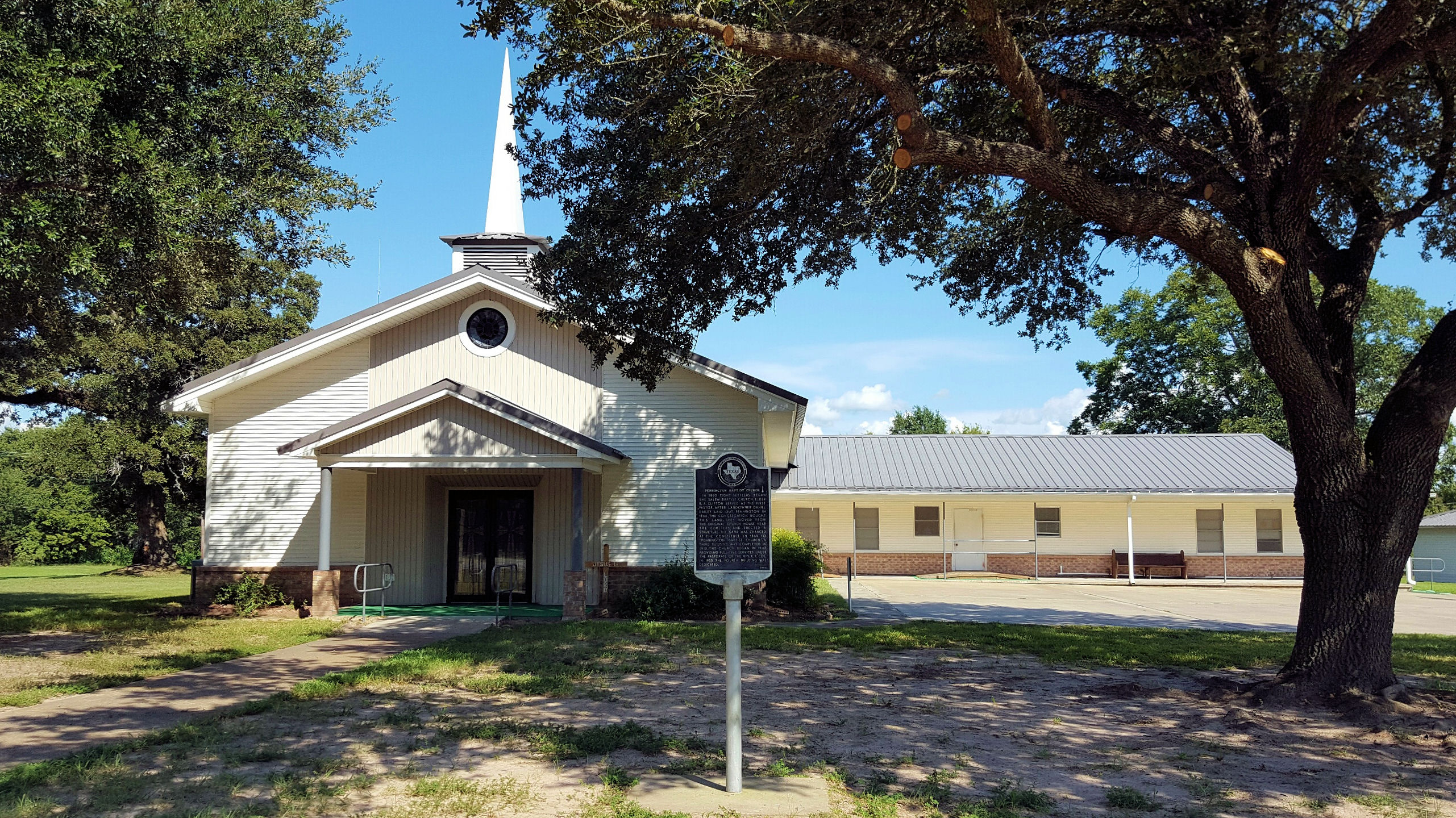
Pennington Baptist Church, 1955

== History ==
The community's location is within the boundaries of the 1835 Mexican Texas property grant to José Martín Prado that A. F. Westall and Daniel Daily (Dailey) acquired in 1855. On March 1, 1859, Daily acquired sole ownership of 1,280 acres (520 ha). In May 1860, the Salem (later Pennington) Baptist Church was established. Hill (or Hugh) Pennington, the town's first shopkeeper, inspired Dan Daily to plan and platted Pennington in February 1866. Pennington, which has had a post office since 1873, had its zenith between May 1874 and October 1882, when it served as the county seat and had a population that may have reached 1,000 to 1,500. Due to the lack of a railroad and the county's relocation to Groveton in 1882, Pennington saw a decline. Despite being formed on July 16, 1901, it seems to have lost its incorporation status by 1904, when it reported having a population of about 272, which then decreased to about 250 by 1926. A population of 198 people or such was estimated in 1968. Around 100 people lived in the tranquil rural village of Pennington in 1980. Pennington reported having 100 residents at the beginning of the 1990s, along with seven enterprises. In 2000, the population was reduced to 67.

On May 3, 2009, an EF1 tornado struck Pennington. A shed was destroyed, and a trailer was shifted off its foundation. Numerous trees were also snapped.

On Christmas Day 2012, two tornadoes struck Pennington. An EF3 tornado caused an agricultural feed store and a restaurant to be obliterated, while several houses and trailers were also destroyed, some severely. Several trees were downed. Another EF0 tornado struck the community, lofting debris but caused no damage.

== Geography ==
Pennington is located off U.S. Highway 287 near the Davy Crockett National Forest, 12 mi (19 km) northwest of Groveton in northwestern Trinity County and southeastern Houston County.

== Education ==
Although it began operations as a coeducational institution in 1866, Pennington College, later known as Steele Academy, did not get a legislative charter until 1870. The institution ran until 1882 under the leadership of teacher and subsequently president Daniel Webster Steele and his successors. Competition from area schools was one cause of Pennington's decline.

The Groveton Independent School District serves students on both the Houston and Trinity County sides of the community.

== See also ==
- Texas State Highway 7
- Farm to Market Road 2781
