= Attorney =

Attorney may refer to:

- Lawyer
  - Attorney at law, in some jurisdictions
- Attorney, one who has power of attorney
- The Attorney, a 2013 South Korean film

== See also ==
- Attorney general, the principal legal officer of (or advisor to) a government
- Attorney's fee, compensation for legal services
- Attorney–client privilege
- Clusia rosea, Scotch attorney, a tropical and sub-tropical flowering plant species
