= 2012 Hurricane Isaac tornado outbreak =

Weather event in the United States

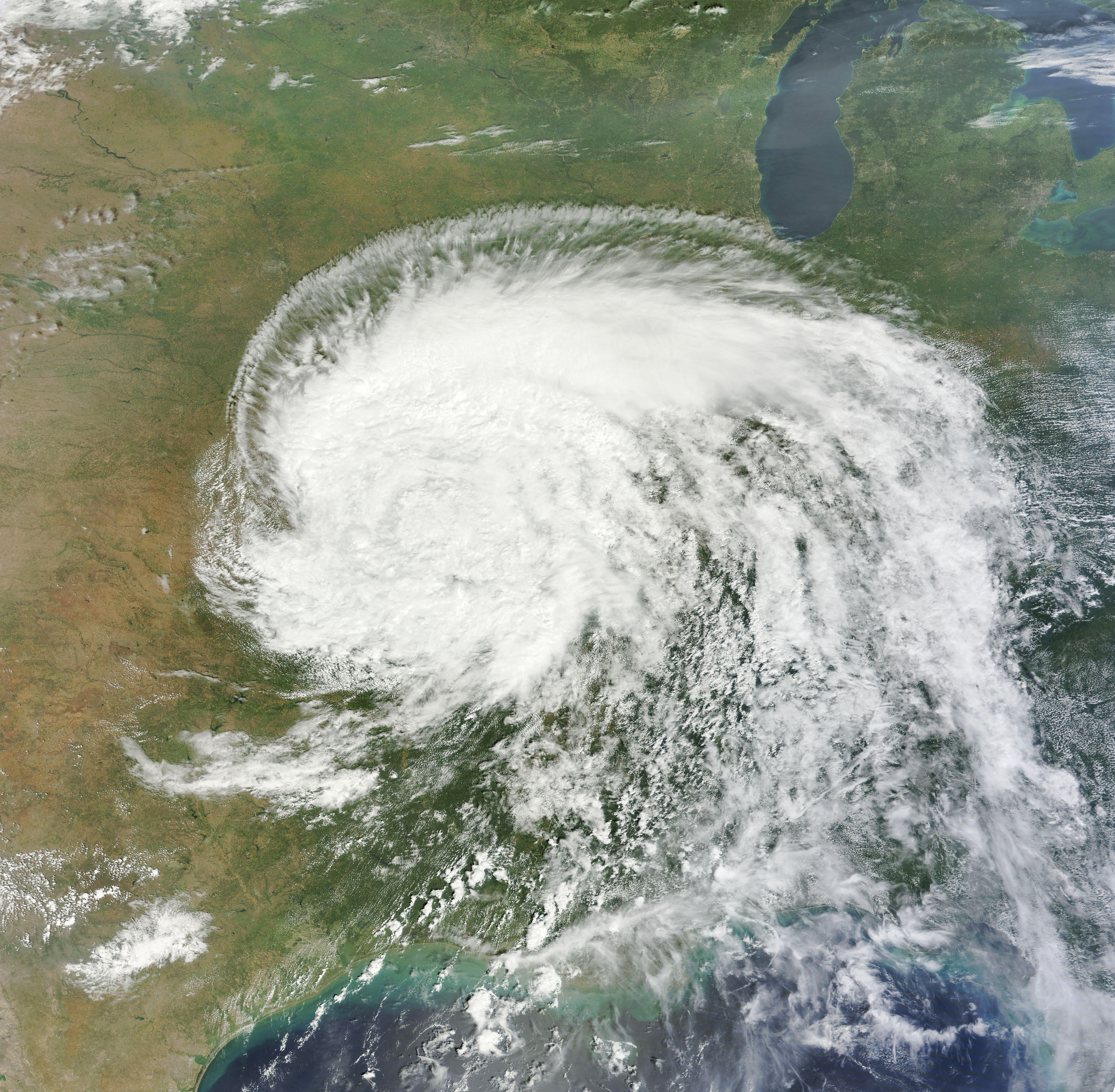
- The remnant low of Isaac moving into the Midwestern United States on August 31

Meteorological history
- Formed: August 27, 2012
- Dissipated: September 4, 2012

Tornado outbreak
- Tornadoes: 32
- Max. rating: EF2 tornado
- Duration: 8 days, 15 hours, 22 minutes

Overall effects
- Injuries: 4
- Damage: $6.38 million (2012 USD)
- Areas affected: Central United States, Eastern United States
- Part of tornadoes outbreaks of 2012, Hurricane Isaac (2012), and the 2012 Atlantic hurricane season

The passage of Hurricane Isaac generated a long-lived, nine-day tornado outbreak that affected the Central and Eastern United States from August 27 to September 4, 2012. The hurricane produced a total of 34 tornadoes, with the strongest being two EF2 tornadoes in Mississippi and Arkansas. There were 19 tornado watches were issued for Isaac over eight days and 171 tornado warnings were issued across 12 states, with 77 of them in Mississippi.

== Event summary ==
A tropical wave emerged off the western coast of Africa into the Atlantic Ocean on August 16. After acquiring a well-defined center of circulation and deep atmospheric convection, the disturbance was deemed organized enough to be declared a tropical depression by 06:00 UTC on August 21 while located about 720 mi (1,160 km) east of the Lesser Antilles. Twelve hours later, the depression intensified into Tropical Storm Isaac. Steered swiftly westward across the eastern Caribbean Sea by a subtropical ridge, the cyclone steadily intensified prior to making landfall near Jacmel, Haiti with winds of 65 mph (105 km/h) by 06:00 UTC on August 25; a few hours later, Isaac moved ashore near Cajobabo, Guantánamo, Cuba with winds of 60 mph (97 km/h). After moving through the Straits of Florida and into the eastern Gulf of Mexico, the system initially struggled to organize as its wind field expanded. By 12:00 UTC on August 28, however, data from an aircraft reconnaissance flight supported designating Isaac as a Category 1 hurricane. The cyclone attained peak winds of 80 mph (130 km/h) prior to making two landfalls, one at the Southwest Pass over the Mississippi River and the second near Port Fourchon, Louisiana. Once inland, Isaac steadily weakened and dissipated over Missouri early on September 1.

On August 22, the Storm Prediction Center noted the potential for severe weather to evolve in association with Isaac; however, considerable model uncertainty precluded the addition of a threat area. Three days later, a severe threat area was outlined across southern Georgia, southeastern Alabama, and northern Florida as the outer bands of the hurricane were forecast to rotate into the region.

== Confirmed tornadoes ==
Confirmed tornadoes by Enhanced Fujita rating
EFU	EF0	EF1	EF2	EF3	EF4	EF5	Total
0	24	6	2	0	0	0	32

=== August 27 event ===
List of confirmed tornadoes - Monday, August 27, 2012 (Note: All dates are based on the local time zone where the tornado touched down; however, all times are in Coordinated Universal Time for consistency.)
EF#	Location	County / Parish	State	Coord.	Time (UTC)	Path length	Max width	Damage (Note: All monetary values are in 2012 United States dollars unless otherwise stated.)	Summary
EF0	S of Narcoossee	Osceola	FL	28.27°N 81.22°W	0709 – 0710	0.83 mi (1.34 km)	30 yd (27 m)	$15,000	An abandoned mobile home was destroyed and shingles were removed from a mobile home. Another home had a broken window and shrub and fence damage on the property. The tornado also passed through citrus groves, knocking down several trees.
EF0	W of Vero Beach	Indian River	FL	27.63°N 80.5°W	1603 – 1605	1.61 mi (2.59 km)	180 yd (160 m)	$500,000	A weak tornado on a discontinuous path caused damage to 95 structures, most of which were mobile homes. Approximately 62 received minor damage with an additional 33 sustaining major damage. Carports and awnings were damaged as well.
EF0	ESE of Tampa	Hillsborough	FL	27.94°N 82.43°W	2044 – 2045	0.04 mi (0.064 km)	20 yd (18 m)	$2,000	A waterspout moved ashore and damaged fences, trees, and roofs at six residences.

=== August 29 event ===
List of confirmed tornadoes - Wednesday, August 29, 2012
EF#	Location	County / Parish	State	Coord.	Time (UTC)	Path length	Max width	Damage	Summary
EF0	NE of Greenwood	Jackson	FL	30.88°N 85.15°W	2212 – 2214	0.37 mi (0.60 km)	25 yd (23 m)	$0	Brief tornado in an open area as documented on video; no damage.
EF1	SSW of Gulfport	Harrison	MS	30.37°N 89.08°W	2218 – 2221	0.5 mi (0.80 km)	25 yd (23 m)	$25,000	A tornado destroyed a home that was under construction and collapsed the roof of a front porch to a separate house. Several trees were downed.
EF0	N of Graceville	Holmes	FL	30.99°N 85.51°W	2224 – 2225	0.27 mi (0.43 km)	25 yd (23 m)	$10,000	The front porch was torn away from a mobile home and numerous trees were downed.
EF1	S of Ocean Springs	Jackson	MS	30.36°N 88.75°W	0014 – 0016	0.43 mi (0.69 km)	40 yd (37 m)	$40,000	Several roofs were damaged and windows were blown out. A few trees were downed as well.

=== August 30 event ===
List of confirmed tornadoes - Thursday, August 30, 2012
EF#	Location	County / Parish	State	Coord.	Time (UTC)	Path length	Max width	Damage	Summary
EF1	N of Lowery	Geneva, Coffee	AL	31.19°N 86.14°W	0744 – 0748	2.97 mi (4.78 km)	35 yd (32 m)	$25,000	Several large trees were knocked down and the roof was torn from a mobile home. Several sheds and a barn were damaged.
EF2	SW of Pascagoula	Jackson	MS	30.34°N 88.55°W	1210 – 1212	0.77 mi (1.24 km)	40 yd (37 m)	$75,000	Impact to homes was largely confined to minor structural damage, with the exception of one home that lost the entirety of its roof. Trees were downed.
EF1	WSW of Creek	Clarke	MS	31.99°N 88.5°W	1449 – 1456	6.1 mi (9.8 km)	100 yd (91 m)	$100,000	Several structures were either damaged or destroyed, including numerous outbuildings and two mobile homes. Light poles, trees, and a fence were downed as well.
EF1	E of Increase	Lauderdale	MS	32.24°N 88.53°W	1518 – 1521	1.4 mi (2.3 km)	100 yd (91 m)	$70,000	Two barns were damaged, two sheds were blown into a pond, and a tree fell on another shed. Numerous trees were snapped or uprooted.
EF0	E of Toxey	Choctaw	AL	31.9°N 88.28°W	1558 – 1600	0.01 mi (0.016 km)	50 yd (46 m)	$5,000	A few trees were downed.

=== August 31 event ===
List of confirmed tornadoes - Friday, August 31, 2012
EF#	Location	County	State	Coord.	Time (UTC)	Path length	Max width	Damage	Summary
EF0	ENE of Fieldon	Jersey	IL	39.11°N 90.47°W	1936 – 1937	0.18 mi (0.29 km)	40 yd (37 m)	Unknown	Minor damage was inflicted to crops and a residence. Trees surrounding the house were snapped off.
EF0	NW of Saint Thomas	Madison	IL	38.78°N 90.13°W	1950 – 1951	0.2 mi (0.32 km)	50 yd (46 m)	$0	A brief tornado touchdown; no reported damage.
EF0	Carrollton area	Greene	IL	39.28°N 90.41°W	2027 – 2030	1.44 mi (2.32 km)	60 yd (55 m)	Unknown	A garage and a storage shed sustained major damage. A home sustained minor roof damage and many trees and power poles were downed.
EF1	Franklin area	Morgan	IL	39.61°N 90.04°W	2027 – 2030	0.25 mi (0.40 km)	75 yd (69 m)	$230,000	A brief tornado destroyed a repair shop, damaged the roof of a house, and rolled a mobile home off its foundation. Several trees were downed.
EF0	NW of Franklin	Morgan	IL	39.64°N 90.09°W	2232 – 2233	0.16 mi (0.26 km)	10 yd (9.1 m)	$0	A brief tornado touchdown in an open field; no reported damage.
EF0	NNE of O'Fallon	St. Charles	MO	38.82°N 90.67°W	2234 – 2235	0.4 mi (0.64 km)	120 yd (110 m)	Unknown	A tornado struck Fort Zumwalt North High School where it downed several trees, blew debris onto the tennis court, broke the window out of a nearby truck, knocked over a set of standalone aluminum bleachers at the football field, and blew soccer goals against a line of trees. It then left the high school property and knocked down several more trees, blew playground equipment from a preschool into a parking lot, and knocked over a small set of bleachers and a portion of a 4-foot high chain-link fence that surrounded a nearby baseball diamond.

=== September 1 event ===
List of confirmed tornadoes - Saturday, September 1, 2012
EF#	Location	County	State	Coord.	Time (UTC)	Path length	Max width	Damage	Summary
EF0	ESE of Benson	Woodford	IL	40.84°N 89.09°W	1648 – 1649	0.06 mi (0.097 km)	20 yd (18 m)	$0	A brief tornado touchdown in an open field; no reported damage.
EF0	N of Benson	Woodford	IL	40.89°N 89.12°W	1703 – 1704	0.69 mi (1.11 km)	20 yd (18 m)	$0	A brief tornado touchdown in an open field; no reported damage.
EF0	NNW of Benson	Woodford, Marshall	IL	40.9°N 89.15°W	1705 – 1709	2.25 mi (3.62 km)	75 yd (69 m)	$5,000	The tornado pulled the tin roof from a shed and damaged a corn field.
EF0	S of Sparland	Marshall	IL	40.96°N 89.45°W	1732 – 1733	0.09 mi (0.14 km)	20 yd (18 m)	$0	A brief tornado touchdown; no reported damage.
EF0	ESE of Wyoming	Stark	IL	41.05°N 89.69°W	1808 – 1811	1.3 mi (2.1 km)	50 yd (46 m)	$0	A brief tornado touchdown in an open field; no reported damage.
EF0	SE of Castleton	Stark	IL	41.08°N 89.65°W	1811 – 1814	1.1 mi (1.8 km)	20 yd (18 m)	$0	A brief tornado touchdown; no reported damage.
EF0	W of Modena	Stark	IL	41.12°N 89.77°W	1824 – 1826	0.94 mi (1.51 km)	50 yd (46 m)	$0	A brief tornado touchdown in an open field; no reported damage.
EF2	N of Corning	Clay	AR	36.41°N 90.65°W	2119 – 2121	0.9 mi (1.4 km)	75 yd (69 m)	$5,050,000	Two hangars at Corning Municipal Airport sustained extensive damage and a few others sustained minor damage. Several aircraft were damaged severely and several power poles were downed. Two homes had windows blown out and the roof of a shed was blown off.
EF0	N of Corning	Clay	AR	36.45°N 90.59°W	2122 – 2123	0.06 mi (0.097 km)	25 yd (23 m)	$5,000	A brief tornado touchdown in a farm field.
EF0	NW of Fisk	Butler	MO	36.8°N 90.29°W	2132 – 2139	2.95 mi (4.75 km)	20 yd (18 m)	$0	A well-documented tornado stayed over open farm country and produced no known damage.
EF0	E of Qulin	Butler	MO	36.6°N 90.25°W	2143 – 2148	4.29 mi (6.90 km)	20 yd (18 m)	$0	The tornado remained over open farm country; no reported damage.
EF0	SSE of Bucoda	Butler	MO	36.09°N 90.21°W	2303 – 2304	0.03 mi (0.048 km)	25 yd (23 m)	$100,000	A farm shed and the equipment inside was damaged by the tornado.
EF0	NNE of Flackville	Marion	IN	39.79°N 86.18°W	2241 – 2242	0.01 mi (0.016 km)	25 yd (23 m)	$0	A downtown tower media camera observed a brief tornado; no reported damage.

=== September 3 event ===
List of confirmed tornadoes - Monday, September 3, 2012
EF#	Location	County	State	Coord.	Time (UTC)	Path length	Max width	Damage	Summary
EF0	S of Wyoming	Kent	DE	39.1°N 75.56°W	1920 – 1921	0.21 mi (0.34 km)	35 yd (32 m)	$100,000	Several houses were damaged, the roof was torn off of a garage, and two vehicles were damaged.

=== September 4 event ===
List of confirmed tornadoes - Tuesday, September 4, 2012
EF#	Location	County	State	Coord.	Time (UTC)	Path length	Max width	Damage	Summary
EF0	Mount Ephraim area	Camden	NJ	39.88°N 75.1°W	2231 – 2232	0.16 mi (0.26 km)	25 yd (23 m)	$25,000	Several homes suffered roof damage, mostly from falling trees. One tree severely damaged a sidewalk.

== See also ==
- List of North American tornadoes and tornado outbreaks
