= Illinois Route 93 =

State highway in Stark County, Illinois, US

Illinois Route 93
- IL 93 highlighted in red

Route information
- Maintained by IDOT
- Length: 9.60 mi (15.45 km)
- Existed: 1924–present

Major junctions
- West end: IL 91 in Elmira
- East end: IL 40 in Bradford

Location
- Country: United States
- State: Illinois
- Counties: Stark

Highway system
- Illinois State Highway System; Interstate; US; State; Tollways; Scenic
← IL 92	→ I-94

Illinois Route 93 (IL 93) is a 9.60-mile-long (15.45 km) east–west state route in central Illinois. It runs from Illinois Route 91, one mile (1.6 km) west of Elmira to Illinois Route 40, one mile (1.6 km) west of Bradford.

== Route description ==
IL 93 is a rural, two-lane undivided surface road for its entire length. It begins at IL 91 just west of Elmira. It travels east and curves north slightly, passing through southern Elmira. Route 93 continues west through slight hills for the majority of its length, passing only township and county roads. After a curve south, it ends at an intersection with IL 40 west of Bradford.

== History ==
SBI Route 93 originally ran from Galva to Bradford, with a southern spur to Toulon. In the early 1930s, U.S. Route 34 replaced Illinois 93 from west of Galva to west of Elmira. In 1936, Illinois Route 91 replaced the remaining segment west of Elmira to the spur, and then south to Toulon.

== Junction list ==
The entire route is in Stark County.

Location	mi	km	Destinations	Notes
Elmira Township	0.00	0.00	IL 91 / 1400 N	
Osceola Township	9.60	15.45	IL 40 / 1600 E	
1.000 mi = 1.609 km; 1.000 km = 0.621 mi
