= Lombardville, Illinois =

- Unincorporated community
- Location within Illinois Location within the United States
- Coordinates: 41°13′16″N 89°39′30″W
- Country: United States
- State: Illinois
- County: Stark
- Elevation: 751 ft (229 m)
- Time zone: UTC-6 (Central (CST))
  - Summer (DST): UTC-5 (CDT)
- Area code: 309
- GNIS feature ID: 412530

Lombardville is an unincorporated community in Stark County, Illinois, United States, located 3 miles (4.8 km) north of Bradford.

== History ==
Lombardville served as a station for the Chicago, Burlington and Quincy Railroad. Lombardville was platted on July 8, 1870, and served as a station for the Buda Rushville Railroad Branch, which connected with the Chicago, Burlington and Quincy Railroad system. In the early 1870s the town had a hotel, grain elevator, and the Lombardville mining company. A post office called Lombardville was established in 1870, and remained in operation until it was discontinued in 1931. The community was named for the Lombard family, the original owners of the town site.
