= Stark, Illinois =

- Unincorporated community
- Location within Illinois Location within the United States
- Coordinates: 40°59′44″N 89°44′38″W
- Country: United States
- State: Illinois
- County: Stark
- Elevation: 659 ft (201 m)
- Time zone: UTC-6 (Central (CST))
  - Summer (DST): UTC-5 (CDT)
- Area code: 309
- GNIS feature ID: 423203

Stark is an unincorporated community in Stark County, Illinois, United States, located on Rock Island Trail State Park, 4.5 miles (7.2 km) north of Princeville.
