= Elmira, Illinois =

- Unincorporated community
- Location within Illinois Location within the United States
- Coordinates: 41°10′47″N 89°49′54″W
- Country: United States
- State: Illinois
- County: Stark
- Elevation: 781 ft (238 m)
- Time zone: UTC-6 (Central (CST))
  - Summer (DST): UTC-5 (CDT)
- Area code: 309
- GNIS feature ID: 407947

Elmira is an unincorporated community in Stark County, Illinois, United States. Elmira is located on Illinois Route 93, 9 miles (14 km) west of Bradford.
