= Wyoming station (Illinois) =

Railway station in Wyoming, Illinois, United States

Wyoming
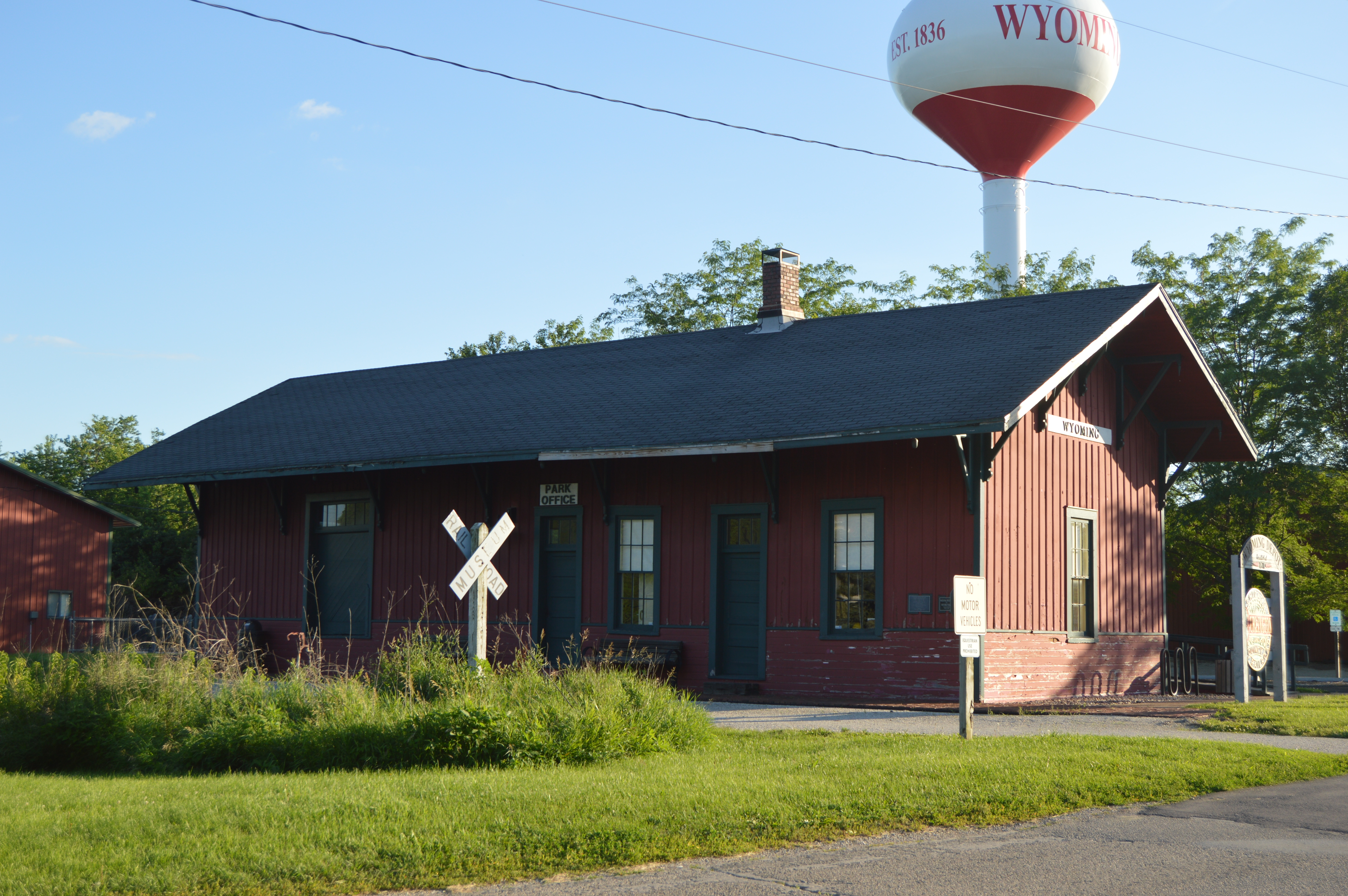
- Front and eastern side

General information
- Location: Williams Street; Wyoming, Illinois
- System: Former Burlington Route passenger rail station
- Owner: railroad museum, visitor center
- Line: Chicago, Burlington and Quincy Railroad Buda—Elmwood branch
- Platforms: 1 side platform
- Tracks: 1

Construction
- Structure type: at-grade
- Cycle facilities: on the Rock Island Trail State Park
- Chicago, Burlington & Quincy Railroad Depot
- U.S. National Register of Historic Places
- Location within Illinois
- Location: Williams Street, Wyoming, Illinois
- Coordinates: 41°3′41″N 89°46′6″W
- Architect: CB&Q railroad
- NRHP reference No.: 87000650
- Added to NRHP: 1987
Location

Wyoming was a Chicago, Burlington and Quincy Railroad station in Wyoming, Illinois. Now the headquarters of the Rock Island Trail State Park, the building is listed on the National Register of Historic Places as the Chicago, Burlington & Quincy Railroad Depot. The station has also been restored to the original red color.

== Train service ==
Wyoming was on the CB&Q's line between Buda and Elmwood, Illinois. The 44 and a half mile line was built by the Dixon, Peoria and Hannibal Railroad, and was bought by the CB&Q in 1899. The Buda-Elmwood branch of the railroad, which by that time had become the Burlington Northern Railroad, was torn out in 1984. The station is near the former Peoria and Rock Island Railroad line, between the Quad Cities and Peoria. That 86 mile line was operated by the Chicago, Rock Island and Pacific Railroad and did not utilize the CB & Q depot. Furthermore, after the Great Depression the CRI & P ceased to offer passenger service on its line, and that line itself was abandoned in 1963.

== Rock Island Trail ==
Wyoming Station is the headquarters of the Rock Island Trail State Park, which maintains the right-of-way between Alta and Toulon. The building also serves as a visitor center and railroad museum for the town.

Preceding station	Burlington Route	Following station
Monica toward St. Louis	St. Louis – Savanna	Lombardville toward Savanna
