= Kickapoo Creek (Peoria County, Illinois) =

Coordinates: 40°39′15″N 89°36′57″W

Kickapoo Creek is a tributary of the Illinois River in the U.S. state of Illinois. After rising in northern Peoria County, it winds through and drains much of the county. In its lower reaches, the creek drains much of the city of Peoria as it approaches its mouth. The creek is credited with powering the first factory in Peoria, an 1830 watermill. Close to the southern city limits of Peoria, the creek discharges into the Illinois River.

The Rock Island Trail passes over upper Kickapoo Creek by bridge. In its midcourse, the creek flows past Jubilee College State Park and Wildlife Prairie Park.
