= Rollin Kirby =

American political cartoonist

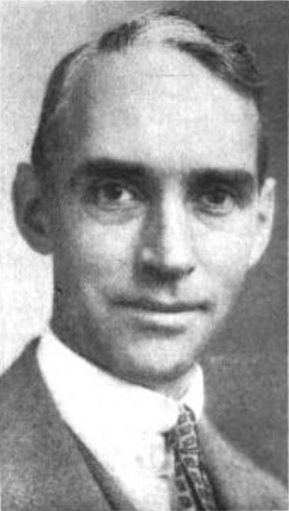
- Kirby c. 1922
- Occupation: Cartoonist
- Known for: Pulitzer Prize for Editorial Cartooning

Rollin Kirby (September 4, 1875 in Galva, Illinois – May 8, 1952 in New York, New York) was an American political cartoonist. In 1922 he was chronologically the first winner of the Pulitzer Prize for Editorial Cartooning, an honor that he would receive three times.

Kirby worked as a cartoonist at the New York Mail, New York World and the New York Post. His Pulitzer Prizes were for cartoons "On the Road to Moscow" (1921), "News from the Outside World" (1924), and "Tammany" (1928).

== Select works ==
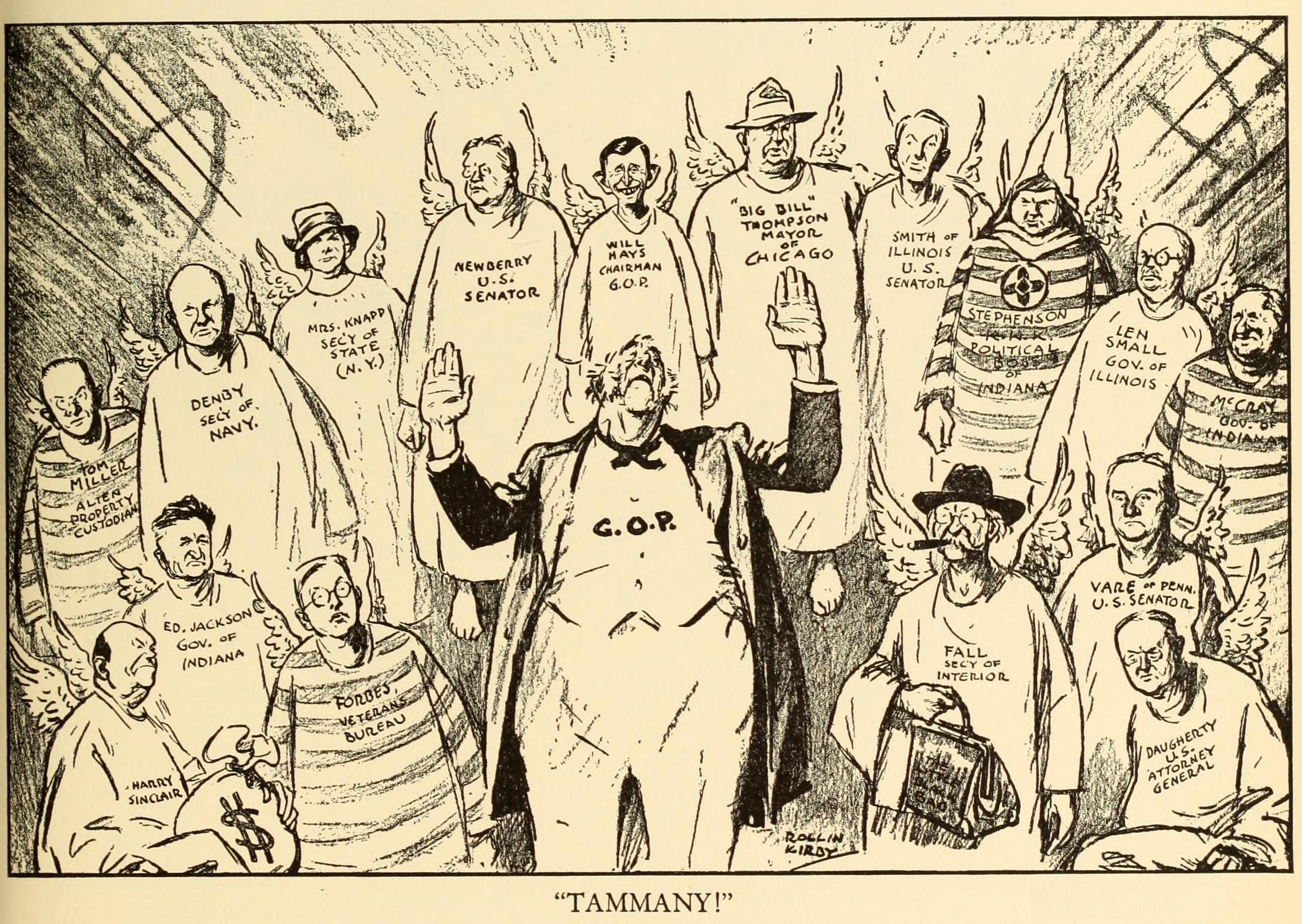
"Tammany!" portrays the Republican party as hypocritical in decrying the Tammany Hall political machine.

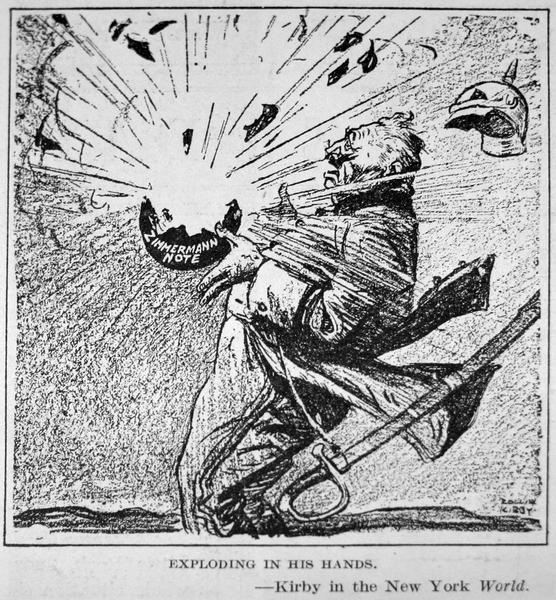
"Exploding in his Hands" comments on the Zimmermann Telegram

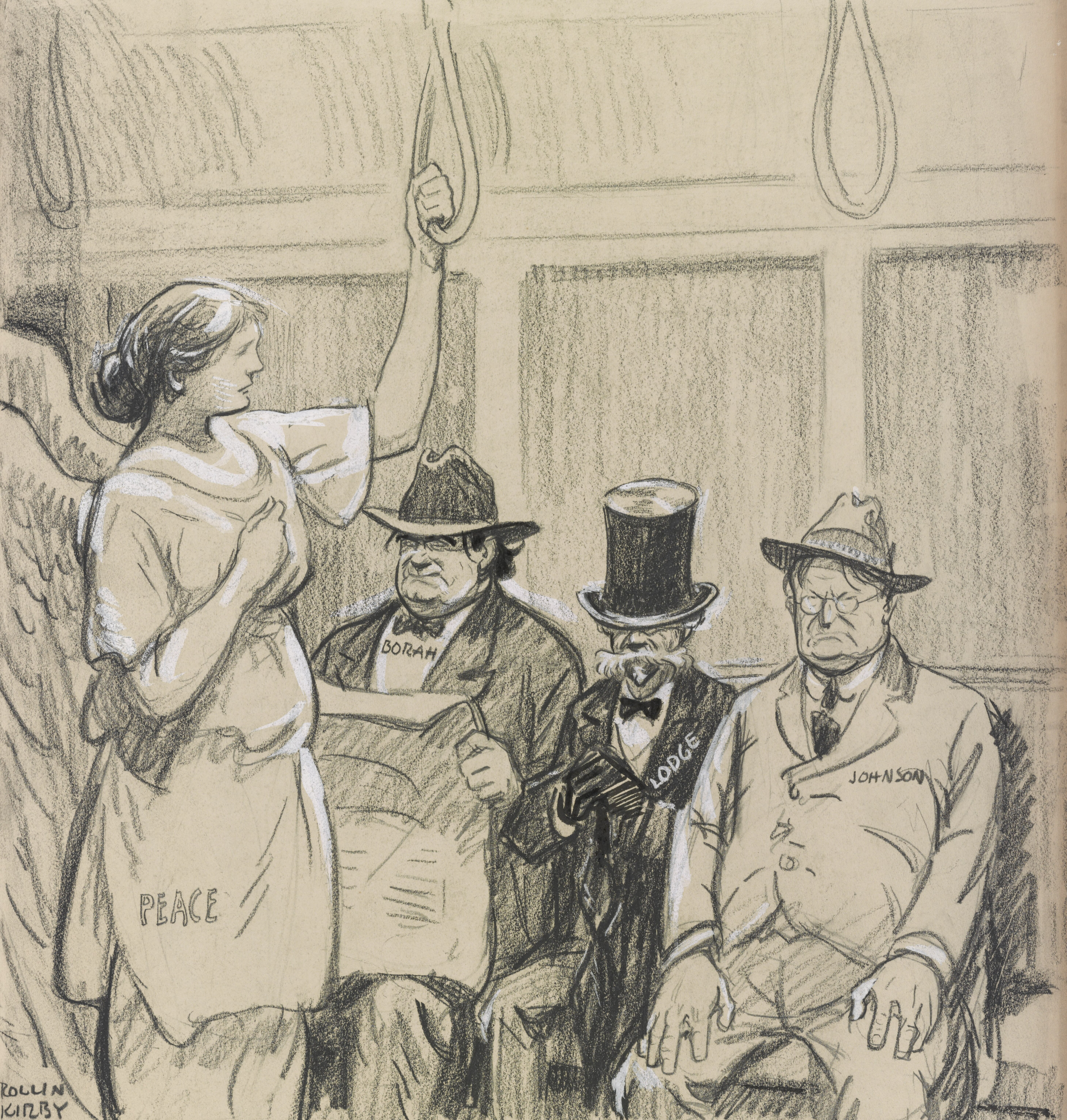
Cartoon showing Senators Lodge, Borah and Hiram Johnson blocking Peace

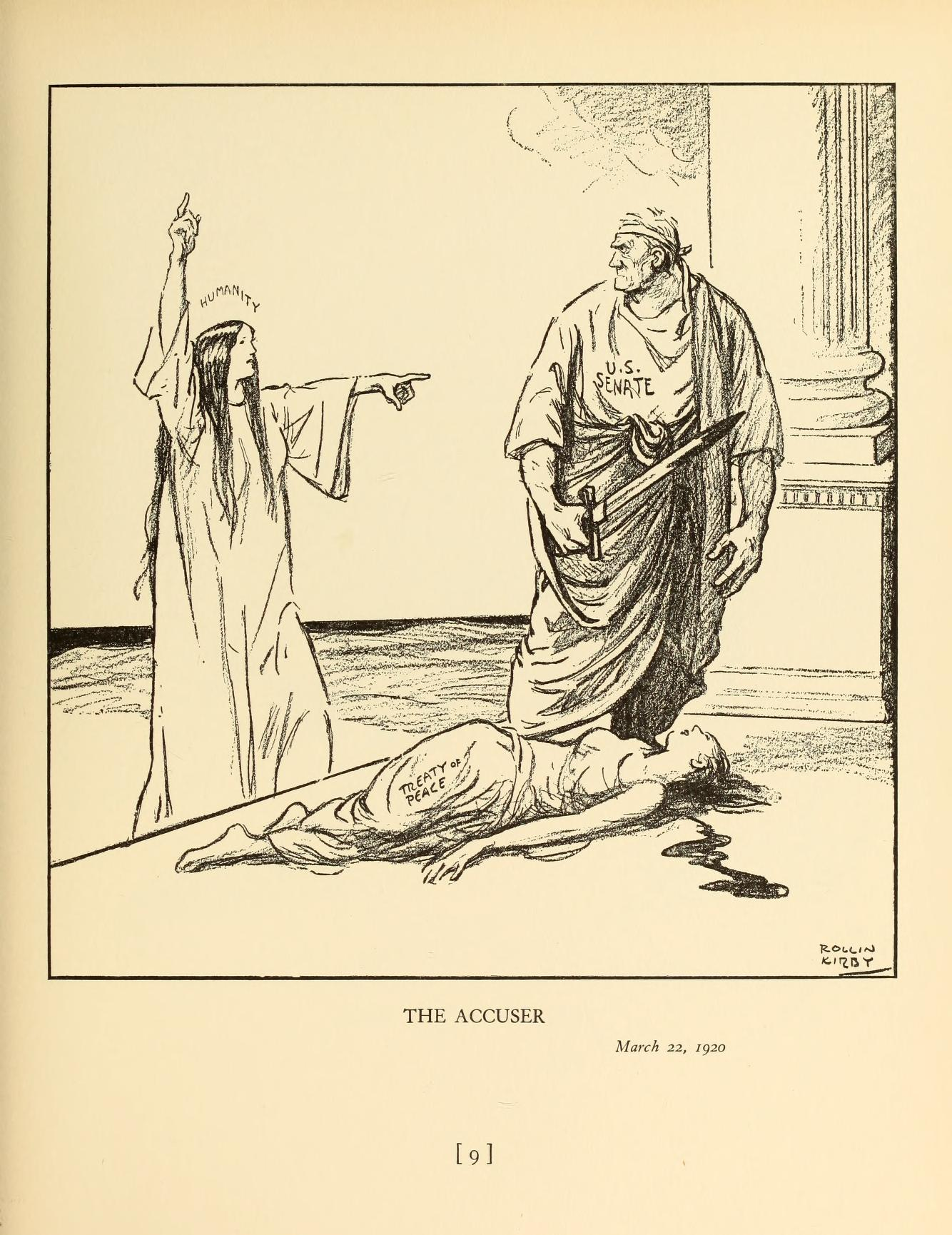
Cartoon showing Humanity accusing the US Senate who has just murdered the Peace Treaty

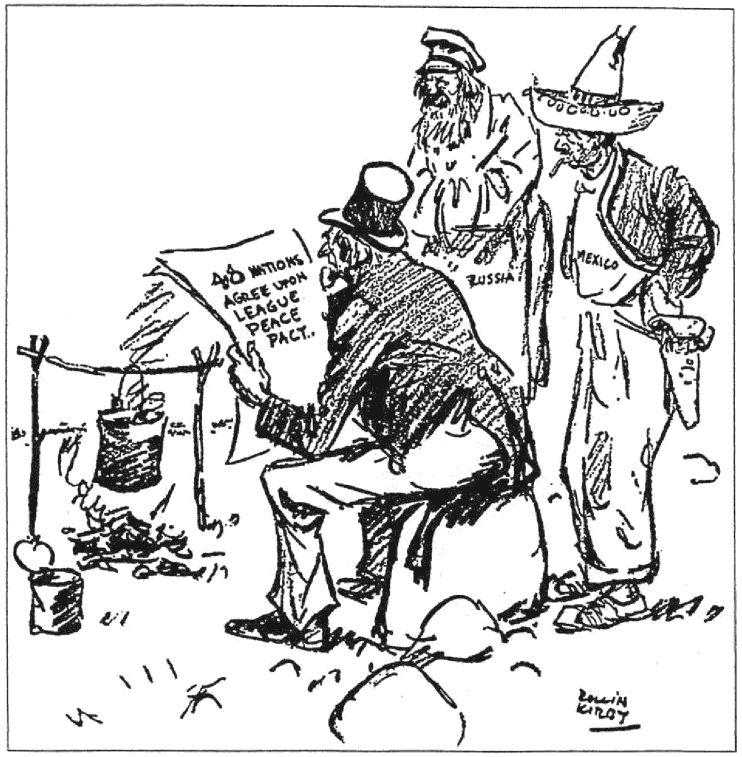
"News From the Outside World" comments on the United States' failure to join the League of Nations.

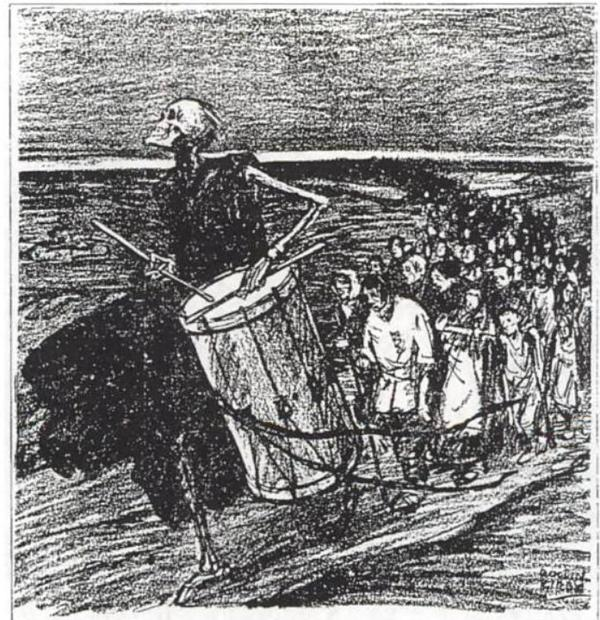
"On the Road to Moscow" depicts Death leading victims of the Russian famine of 1921

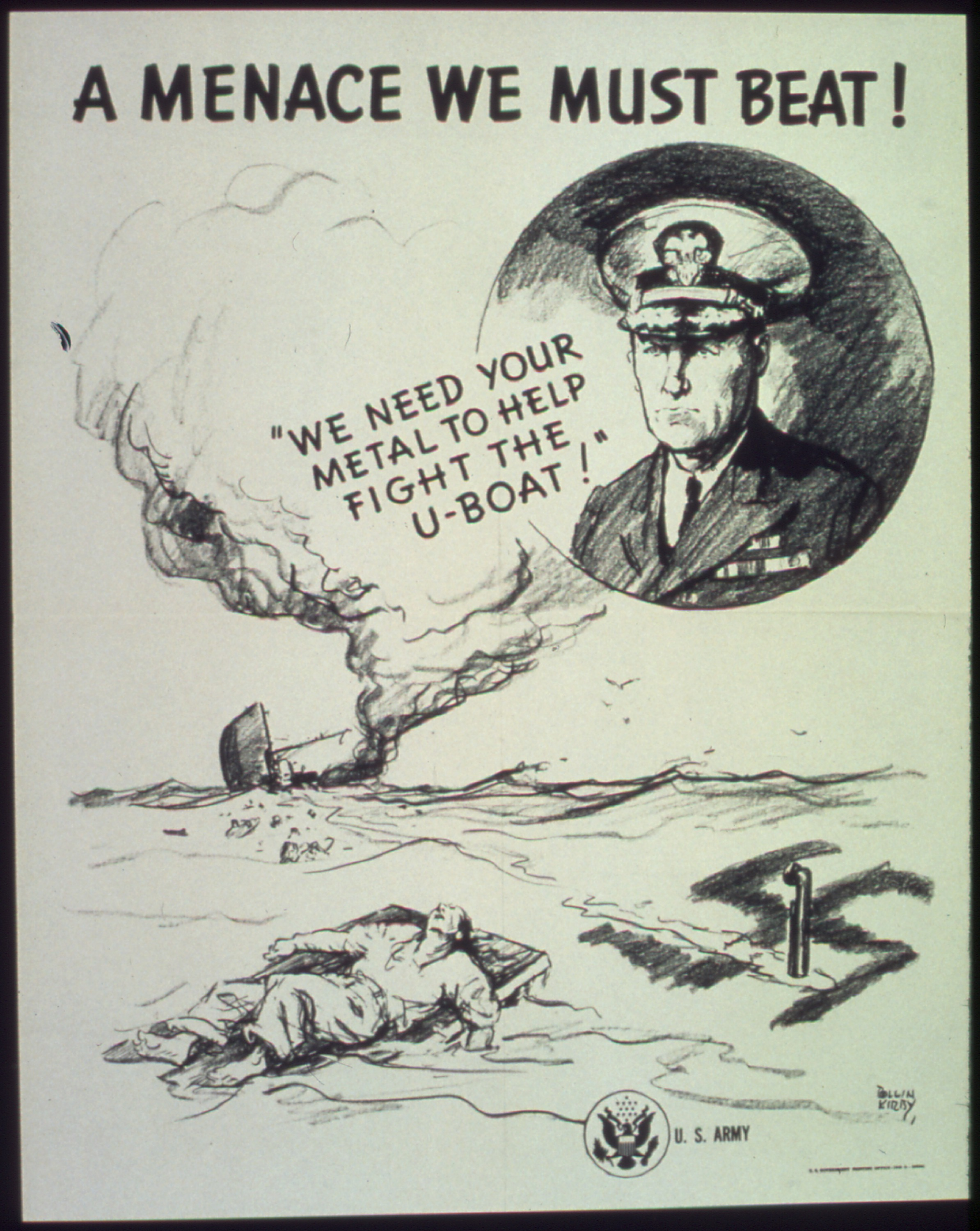
Propaganda cartoon used during World War II.
