= Castleton, Illinois =

- Unincorporated community
- Location within Illinois Location within the United States
- Coordinates: 41°07′04″N 89°42′22″W
- Country: United States
- State: Illinois
- County: Stark
- Elevation: 787 ft (240 m)
- Time zone: UTC-6 (Central (CST))
  - Summer (DST): UTC-5 (CDT)
- ZIP code: 61426
- Area code: 309
- GNIS feature ID: 405694

Castleton is an unincorporated community in Stark County, Illinois, United States, located 5 miles (8.0 km) northeast of Wyoming. Castleton has a post office with ZIP code 61426.

Castleton was named for Dr. Alfred Castle, who was instrumental in introducing a railroad into the settlement.
