= Toulon Township, Stark County, Illinois =

Coordinates: 41°06′01″N 89°48′55″W

Toulon Township
- Township
- Location in Stark County

- Stark County's location in Illinois
- Country: United States
- State: Illinois
- County: Stark
- Established: November 2, 1852

Area
  - Total: 35.72 sq mi (92.5 km^{2})
  - Land: 35.48 sq mi (91.9 km^{2})
  - Water: 0.24 sq mi (0.62 km^{2}) 0.67%

Population (2010)
  - Estimate (2016): 2,328
  - Density: 68.2/sq mi (26.3/km^{2})
- Time zone: UTC-6 (CST)
  - Summer (DST): UTC-5 (CDT)
- FIPS code: 17-175-75796

Toulon Township is located in Stark County, Illinois. As of the 2010 census, its population was 2,420 and it contained 1,080 housing units.

== Geography ==
According to the 2010 census, the township has a total area of 35.72 square miles (92.5 km^{2}), of which 35.48 square miles (91.9 km^{2}) (or 99.33%) is land and 0.24 square miles (0.62 km^{2}) (or 0.67%) is water.

== Demographics ==
Historical population
| Census | Pop. | Note | %± |
|---|---|---|---|
| 2016 (est.) | 2,328 |
U.S. Decennial Census
