= Modena, Illinois =

- Unincorporated community
- Location within Illinois Location within the United States
- Coordinates: 41°08′07″N 89°45′47″W
- Country: United States
- State: Illinois
- County: Stark
- Elevation: 689 ft (210 m)
- Time zone: UTC-6 (Central (CST))
  - Summer (DST): UTC-5 (CDT)
- Area code: 309
- GNIS feature ID: 413696

Modena is an unincorporated community in Stark County, Illinois, United States. It is located 5 miles (8.0 km) north of Wyoming.

== History ==
A post office called Modena was established in 1861 and remained in operation until 1906. The community was named after Modena, in Italy.
