= Valley Township, Stark County, Illinois =

Coordinates: 41°00′58″N 89°41′39″W

Valley Township
- Township
- Location in Stark County

- Stark County's location in Illinois
- Country: United States
- State: Illinois
- County: Stark
- Established: November 2, 1852

Area
  - Total: 36.49 sq mi (94.5 km^{2})
  - Land: 36.49 sq mi (94.5 km^{2})
  - Water: 0 sq mi (0 km^{2})

Population (2010)
  - Estimate (2016): 284
  - Density: 8/sq mi (3.1/km^{2})
- Time zone: UTC-6 (CST)
  - Summer (DST): UTC-5 (CDT)
- FIPS code: 17-175-77174

Valley Township is located in Stark County, Illinois. As of the 2010 census, its population was 293 and it contained 123 housing units.

== Geography ==
According to the 2010 census, the township has a total area of 36.49 square miles (94.5 km^{2}), all land.

== Demographics ==
Historical population
Census	Pop.	Note	%±
2016 (est.)	284
U.S. Decennial Census
