= West Jersey Township, Stark County, Illinois =

Coordinates: 41°01′12″N 89°55′41″W

West Jersey Township
- Township
- Location in Stark County

- Stark County's location in Illinois
- Country: United States
- State: Illinois
- County: Stark
- Established: November 2, 1852

Area
  - Total: 36.7 sq mi (95 km^{2})
  - Land: 36.69 sq mi (95.0 km^{2})
  - Water: 0 sq mi (0 km^{2}) 0%

Population (2010)
  - Estimate (2016): 275
  - Density: 7.7/sq mi (3.0/km^{2})
- Time zone: UTC-6 (CST)
  - Summer (DST): UTC-5 (CDT)
- FIPS code: 17-175-80489

West Jersey Township is located in Stark County, Illinois. As of the 2010 census, its population was 284 and it contained 128 housing units.

== Geography ==
According to the 2010 census, the township has a total area of 36.7 square miles (95 km^{2}), all land.

== Demographics ==
Historical population
Census	Pop.	Note	%±
2016 (est.)	275
U.S. Decennial Census
