= Rock Island Trail State Park (Illinois) =

State park in Illinois, USA

- IUCN category III (natural monument or feature)
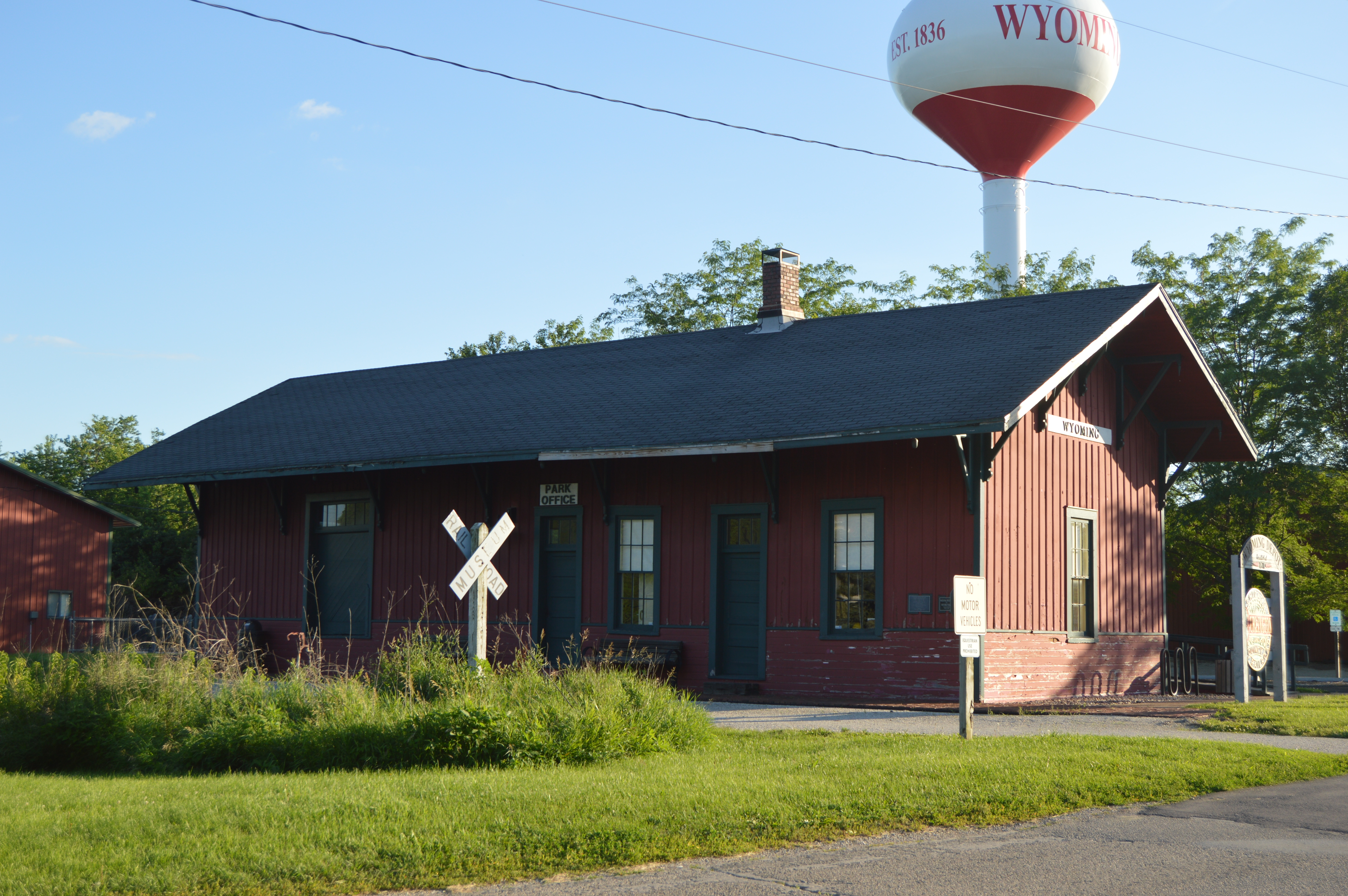
- Wyoming station, the trail headquarters

- Location within Illinois Location within the United States
- Location: Stark and Peoria counties, Illinois, USA
- Nearest city: Wyoming, Illinois
- Coordinates: 40°58′12″N 89°44′42″W
- Area: 26 miles (42 km)
- Established: 1989
- Governing body: Illinois Department of Natural Resources

The Rock Island Trail State Park is a 26-mile (42 km) long public rail trail in the west-central region of the U.S. state of Illinois. It was designated a National Recreation Trail in 2003.

It passes through portions of Peoria and Stark counties. The southern end of the trail is currently located at Pioneer Parkway in north Peoria, Illinois, and the northern end is in Toulon, Illinois, the county seat of Stark County. The right-of-way served as a railroad line from 1871 to 1963, was unused in 1963-1989, and has been a public trail since 1989.

== History ==
The trail derives its name from the former Chicago, Rock Island and Pacific Railroad, commonly known as the Rock Island. The current Rock Island Trail is a fragment of what was once a predecessor railroad, the Peoria and Rock Island Railroad built in 1869-1871, stretching southeastward from the Quad Cities of Illinois and Iowa to Peoria. The Rock Island soon acquired the Peoria and Rock Island and added it to their extensive trackage throughout the North American Great Plains; and this branch line once delivered large quantities of barley, rye, and other small grains to the distilleries of Peoria for the manufacture of American blended whiskey. With the coming of Prohibition in 1920, use of the railroad for this purpose declined, and the last train ran in 1963.

The Rock Island Trail became one of the first rail-trail conversions in downstate Illinois. The right-of-way was acquired for public use in 1965 and was deeded to the State in 1969, but it was only after a twenty-four-year period, in 1989, that the line was opened for use as a public trail. The official dedication came in May 1990.

== Points of interest ==
From south (Peoria) to north (Toulon):

- Pedestrian tunnel under Illinois Route 6 (Kellar Branch extension)
- Kickapoo Creek Recreation Area, including a Class D camping area and 14 acres (5.7 ha) of restored tallgrass prairie (Fox Road, north of Alta)
- Bridge over Kickapoo Creek (Cedar Hills Drive, south of Dunlap, Illinois)
- Class B tallgrass prairie remnant (County Line Road, north of Princeville, Illinois)
- Chicago, Burlington and Quincy Depot and state trail headquarters (east side of Wyoming, Illinois)
- Bridge over the Spoon River (2 miles (3.2 km) west of Wyoming)

== See also ==
- List of protected areas of Illinois
- List of rail trails in the United States
