= Penn Township, Stark County, Illinois =

Coordinates: 41°06′05″N 89°41′12″W

Penn Township
- Township
- Location in Stark County

- Stark County's location in Illinois
- Country: United States
- State: Illinois
- County: Stark
- Established: November 2, 1852

Area
  - Total: 36.02 sq mi (93.3 km^{2})
  - Land: 36 sq mi (93 km^{2})
  - Water: 0.02 sq mi (0.052 km^{2}) 0.06%

Population (2010)
  - Estimate (2016): 343
  - Density: 9.8/sq mi (3.8/km^{2})
- Time zone: UTC-6 (CST)
  - Summer (DST): UTC-5 (CDT)
- FIPS code: 17-175-58603

Penn Township is located in Stark County, Illinois. As of the 2010 census, its population was 354 and it contained 136 housing units.

== Geography ==
According to the 2010 census, the township has a total area of 36.02 square miles (93.3 km^{2}), of which 36 square miles (93 km^{2}) (or 99.94%) is land and 0.02 square miles (0.052 km^{2}) (or 0.06%) is water.

== Demographics ==
Historical population
Census	Pop.	Note	%±
2016 (est.)	343
U.S. Decennial Census
