= Eva Katherine Clapp =

American poet (1857–1916)

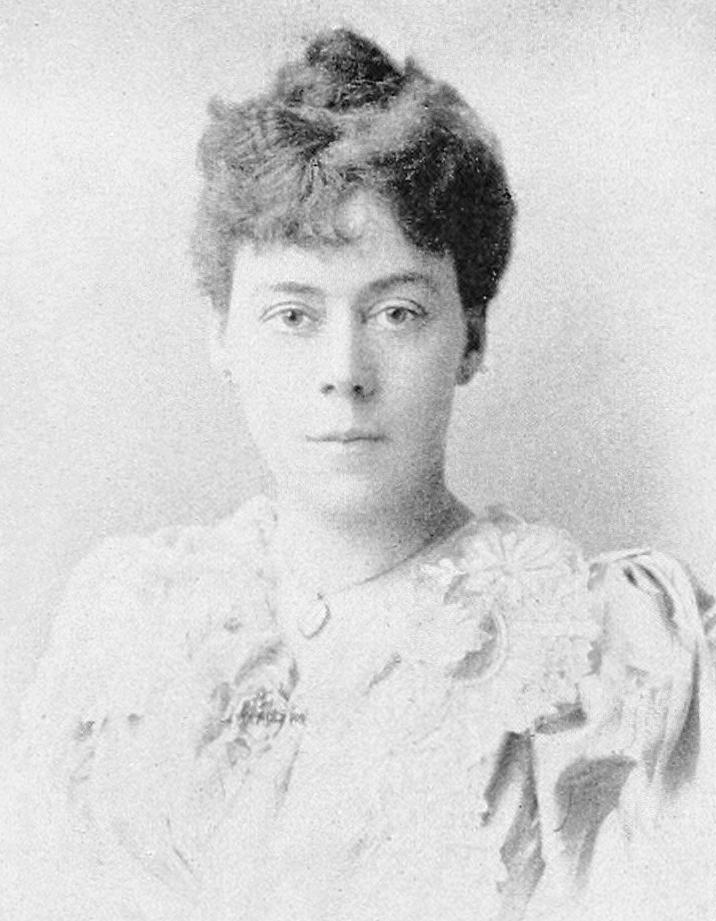
- A Woman of the Century
- Born: August 10, 1857; Bradford, Illinois
- Died: March 6, 1916
- Education: Milwaukee Female College
- Occupation: Writer
- Spouse: C. B. Gibson of Chicago (m. 1892)
- Writing career
- Notable work: Zauberlinda the Wise Witch (1901)

Eva Katherine Clapp (after marriage, Eva Katherine Gibson; August 10, 1857 – March 6, 1916) was an American writer of novels, short stories, and poems. She is best known for her novel Zauberlinda the Wise Witch (1901), which took inspiration from The Wonderful Wizard of Oz (1900) by L. Frank Baum.

== Early life and education ==
Clapp was born in Bradford, Illinois, August 10, 1857. Her father removed from Western Massachusetts and purchased a section of the best farming land in the state. There, he built a log house and his children were born here. Clapp's paternal grandmother was Lucy Lee, who was a direct descendant, on her father's side, from Pocahontas. Her mother was Ann Ely, from Litchfield, Connecticut, a direct descendant from Lady Alice Fenwick, a romantic figure in colonial times, of Old Lyme, Connecticut. Clapp passed the first 11 years of her life on her father's farm. After her mother's death, when she was 11, she lived with a married sister. She attended school at Amboy, Illinois, at the Dover Academy, and subsequently at the Milwaukee Female College. When she was about 16 years, she visited for a time in the large eastern cities, and subsequently taught school in Western Massachusetts.

== Career ==
Clapp started writing at an early age and her writings were characterized by a high moral tone. Her first story, written when she was 20 years old, was a novel entitled Her Bright Future, drawn largely from life. Some 30,000 copies were sold. This was followed by a A Lucky Mishap and Mismated, which reached a sale of about 10,000 copies. A Woman's Triumph, and a serial first published in one of the Chicago dailies as "Tragedies of Prairie Life," and subsequently published in book form as a A Dark Secret followed. She wrote many short stories and sketches, and did considerable editorial work. "Her Bright Future" was a sermon on the evil of intemperance, while "Mismated" presents the errors in our social system which its title indicates.

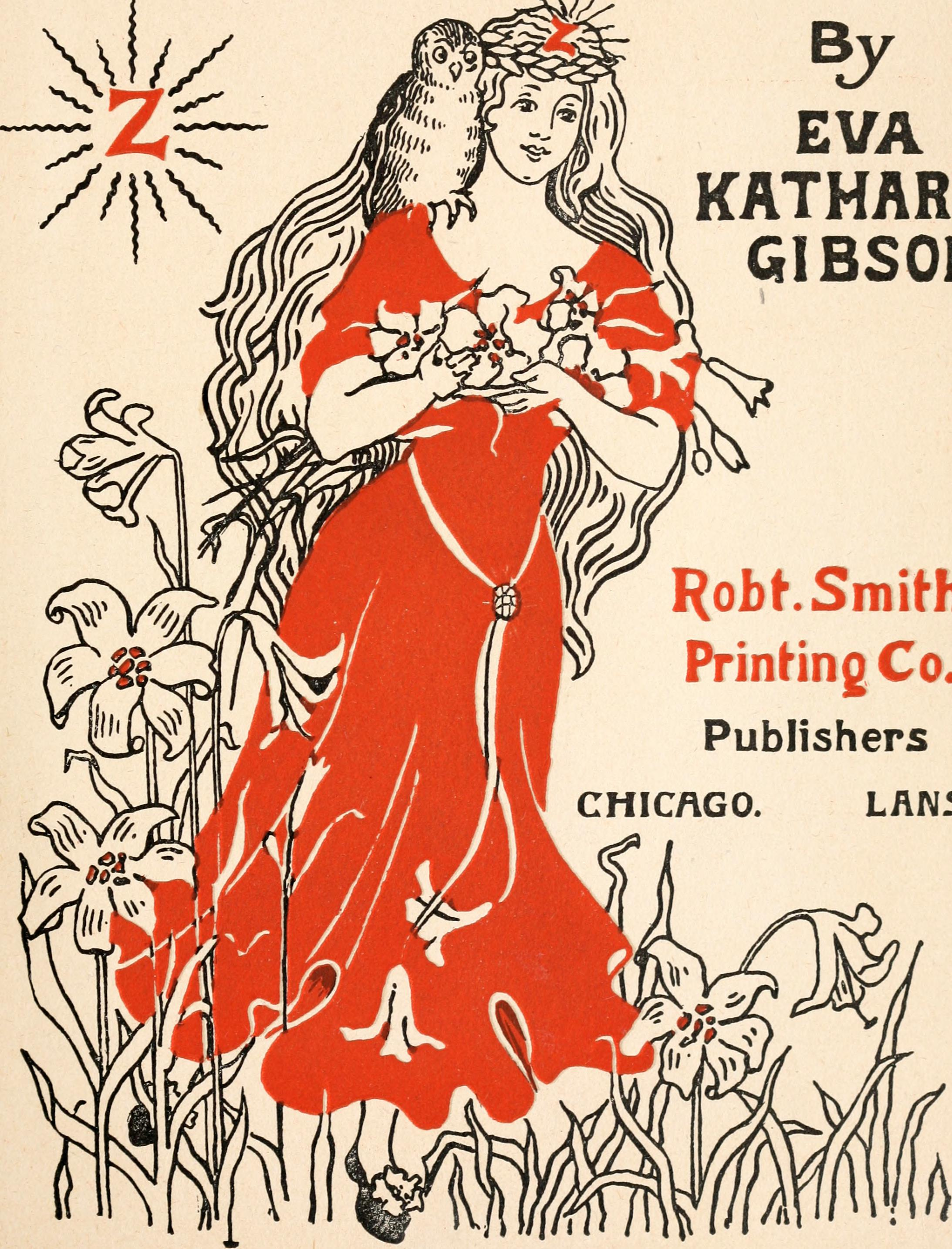
Frontispiece of Zauberlinda the Wise Witch (1901)

Clapp's poems had a wide circulation. They appeared in the Chicago Current, the Interior, the Chicago Times, the Chicago Tribune, the Inter Ocean, and the Boston Budget. She wrote regularly for the Boston Transcript, and the Register, of Berlin, Germany. Her poems were compiled for publication in book form, under the title, Songs of Red Rose Land.

Clapp married Dr. C. B. Gibson of Chicago, in 1892, and spent a year in Europe, where she made a study of the literature of Germany and France. In 1900, she was writing for the New Bohemian magazine of Cincinnati which was trying to appeal to Bohemians in Ohio.

Her 1901 book Zauberlinda the Wise Witch is available as an audio book. She published this story under her second married name.

== Personal life ==
On December 30, 1903, she was lucky to escape with just "bad burns" in the Iroquois Theatre fire that killed more than 600 people. The fire consumed the Iroquoi Theatre in Chicago. She had been sitting in the fifth row when there was a fire on stage and the safety curtain failed to fall and protect the audience. At least 602 were killed and the theater was consumed. She died in 1916.

== Selected works ==
- A Lucky Mishap: A Novel (1883)
- Her Bright Future: A Story of Today (1883)
- A Woman's Triumph: A True Story of Western Life (1885)
- A Dark Secret (1889)
- Zauberlinda, the Wise Witch (1901)
- The Women of Liege (1914)
