= Reuben Beals =

American politician (1832–1916)

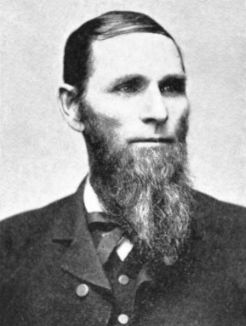

Member of the Illinois House of Representatives
- In office 1891–1895

Personal details
- Born: Reuben Franklin Beals; August 12, 1832 Cuyahoga County, Ohio, US
- Died: December 31, 1916 (aged 84) Galva, Illinois, US
- Resting place: Carpenter, farmer
- Party: Republican

Reuben Franklin Beals (August 12, 1832 – December 31, 1916) was an American carpenter, farmer, and politician.

== Biography ==
Beals was born near Cleveland, Ohio. He lived on the farm near Cleveland and went to the public schools. He moved to Illinois and eventually settled in Galva. Beals was a farmer and a carpenter. He served in the 102nd Illinois Infantry Regiment during the American Civil War. Beals served on the Henry County, Illinois Board of Supervisors. Beals then served in the Illinois House of Representatives from 1891 to 1895 and was a Republican. He was also served as mayor of Galva.

Beals died in Galva, Illinois on December 31, 1916.
