= Galva, Illinois =

Galva
- City
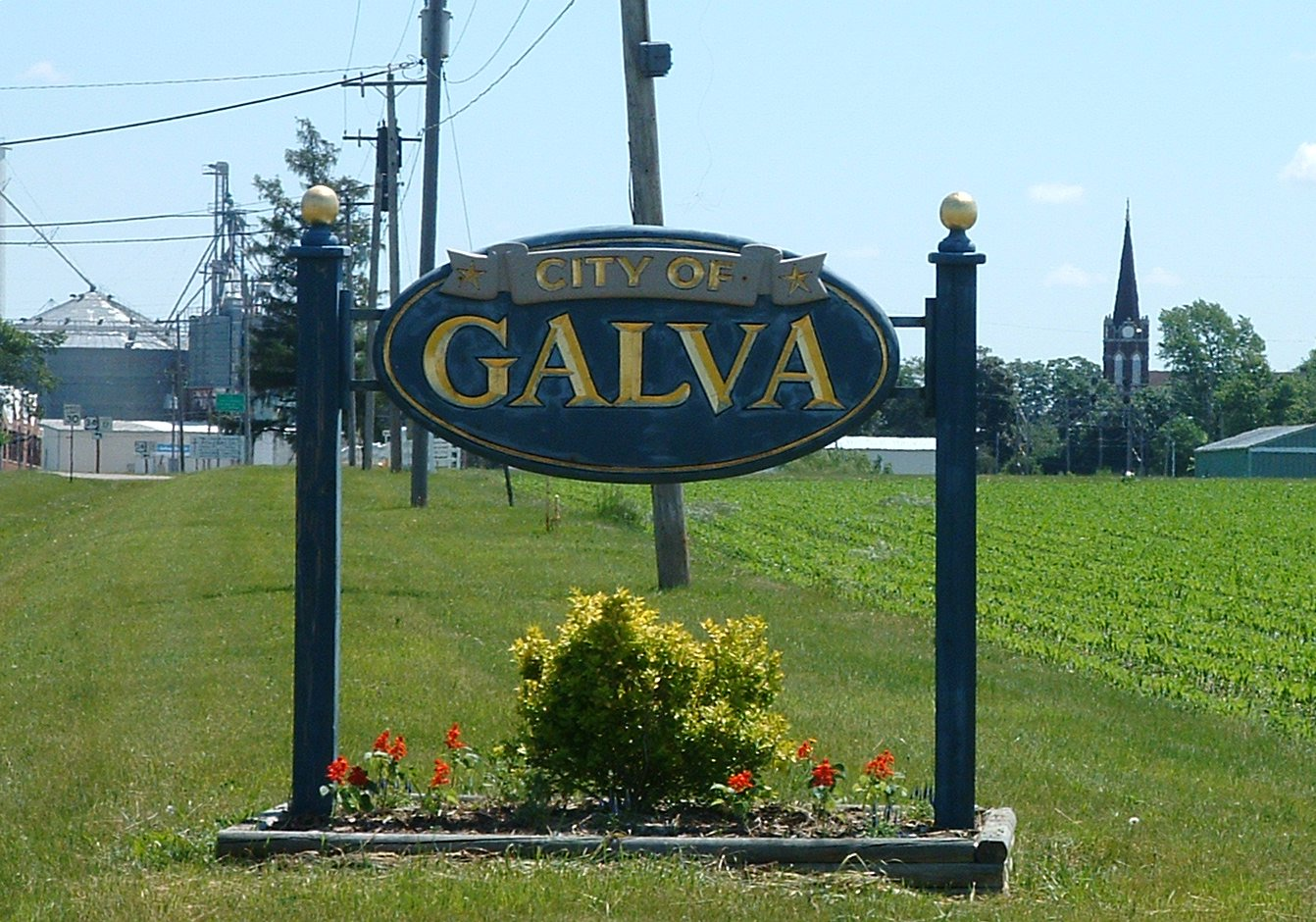
- Nickname: City of Go
- Location of Galva in Henry County, Illinois.
- Coordinates: 41°10′08″N 90°02′15″W
- Country: United States
- State: Illinois
- County: Henry

Area
  - Total: 2.75 sq mi (7.13 km^{2})
  - Land: 2.75 sq mi (7.13 km^{2})
  - Water: 0 sq mi (0.00 km^{2})
- Elevation: 833 ft (254 m)

Population (2020)
  - Total: 2,470
  - Density: 896.6/sq mi (346.18/km^{2})
- Time zone: UTC-6 (CST)
  - Summer (DST): UTC-5 (CDT)
- ZIP code: 61434
- Area code: 309
- FIPS code: 17-28430
- GNIS feature ID: 2394847
- Website: www.galvail.gov

Galva is a city in southern Henry County, Illinois, United States. The population was 2,470 at the 2020 census.

== History ==
Cousins William L. Wiley (1820–1900) and James Wiley (1817–1886) founded Galva in 1854. The name Galva honors the Swedish immigrants of nearby Bishop Hill and refers to Gävle, Sweden which is the town's sister city. Today around 80% of the town has Scandinavian ancestry.

Galva was a railroad town. Galva was laid out along the Chicago, Burlington and Quincy Railroad (Burlington Route) with the help of Bishop Hill trustees who invested heavily in Galva. This was the first of three rail lines to locate there. This group was formed in 1852 and ran a line from Aurora, Illinois to Galesburg, Illinois. A second branch of the Burlington Route later also came through. Later the Peoria and Rock Island Railroad (Rock Island Railroad) came through Galva. Several Amtrak lines run through the town, including the California Zephyr and Southwest Chief, but none stop in Galva. A station is located 10 miles north in Kewanee for the Illinois Zephyr and Carl Sandburg, and 25 miles south in Galesburg for all trains.

== Geography ==
According to the 2021 census gazetteer files, Galva has a total area of 2.76 square miles (7.15 km^{2}), all land.

=== Climate ===
Climate data for Galva, Illinois (1991–2020 normals, extremes 1887–present)
Month	Jan	Feb	Mar	Apr	May	Jun	Jul	Aug	Sep	Oct	Nov	Dec	Year
Record high °F (°C)	67 (19)	71 (22)	86 (30)	93 (34)	105 (41)	105 (41)	111 (44)	105 (41)	101 (38)	93 (34)	83 (28)	69 (21)	111 (44)
Mean daily maximum °F (°C)	30.0 (−1.1)	35.1 (1.7)	48.2 (9.0)	61.4 (16.3)	72.6 (22.6)	81.5 (27.5)	84.1 (28.9)	82.3 (27.9)	76.5 (24.7)	63.8 (17.7)	48.3 (9.1)	35.7 (2.1)	60.0 (15.6)
Daily mean °F (°C)	21.5 (−5.8)	26.0 (−3.3)	37.7 (3.2)	49.6 (9.8)	61.4 (16.3)	70.6 (21.4)	73.5 (23.1)	71.2 (21.8)	64.0 (17.8)	52.1 (11.2)	38.6 (3.7)	27.3 (−2.6)	49.5 (9.7)
Mean daily minimum °F (°C)	12.9 (−10.6)	16.8 (−8.4)	27.2 (−2.7)	37.8 (3.2)	50.2 (10.1)	59.8 (15.4)	62.9 (17.2)	60.2 (15.7)	51.5 (10.8)	40.3 (4.6)	28.9 (−1.7)	18.8 (−7.3)	38.9 (3.8)
Record low °F (°C)	−32 (−36)	−28 (−33)	−12 (−24)	9 (−13)	22 (−6)	34 (1)	44 (7)	38 (3)	19 (−7)	9 (−13)	−7 (−22)	−26 (−32)	−32 (−36)
Average precipitation inches (mm)	1.62 (41)	1.76 (45)	2.35 (60)	4.22 (107)	4.82 (122)	5.17 (131)	3.63 (92)	3.73 (95)	3.97 (101)	2.84 (72)	2.55 (65)	2.01 (51)	38.67 (982)
Average precipitation days (≥ 0.01 in)	4.9	5.3	8.0	10.1	10.2	10.4	7.5	7.6	7.3	7.6	7.1	5.6	91.6
Source: NOAA

== Demographics ==
Historical population
Census	Pop.	Note	%±
1860	1,005		—
1870	2,160		114.9%
1880	2,148		−0.6%
1890	2,409		12.2%
1900	2,682		11.3%
1910	2,498		−6.9%
1920	2,974		19.1%
1930	2,875		−3.3%
1940	2,812		−2.2%
1950	2,886		2.6%
1960	3,060		6.0%
1970	3,061		0.0%
1980	3,185		4.1%
1990	2,742		−13.9%
2000	2,758		0.6%
2010	2,589		−6.1%
2020	2,470		−4.6%
U.S. Decennial Census

=== 2020 census ===
As of the 2020 census, Galva had a population of 2,470. The population density was 896.55 inhabitants per square mile (346.16/km^{2}). There were 1,099 households and 683 families residing in the city.

The median age was 42.7 years. 22.0% of residents were under the age of 18 and 21.3% of residents were 65 years of age or older. For every 100 females there were 95.3 males, and for every 100 females age 18 and over there were 96.4 males age 18 and over.

0.0% of residents lived in urban areas, while 100.0% lived in rural areas.

Of the 1,099 households, 25.3% had children under the age of 18 living in them. Of all households, 42.7% were married-couple households, 20.9% were households with a male householder and no spouse or partner present, and 27.7% were households with a female householder and no spouse or partner present. About 36.9% of all households were made up of individuals, and 18.5% had someone living alone who was 65 years of age or older. The average household size was 2.95 and the average family size was 2.21.

There were 1,254 housing units at an average density of 455.17 per square mile (175.74/km^{2}). Of the housing units, 12.4% were vacant. The homeowner vacancy rate was 3.3% and the rental vacancy rate was 16.6%.

Racial composition as of the 2020 census
Race	Number	Percent
White	2,306	93.4%
Black or African American	23	0.9%
American Indian and Alaska Native	3	0.1%
Asian	5	0.2%
Native Hawaiian and Other Pacific Islander	0	0.0%
Some other race	9	0.4%
Two or more races	124	5.0%
Hispanic or Latino (of any race)	72	2.9%

=== Income and poverty ===
The median income for a household in the city was $44,191, and the median income for a family was $65,913. Males had a median income of $44,935 versus $27,288 for females. The per capita income for the city was $25,796. About 14.3% of families and 19.5% of the population were below the poverty line, including 44.3% of those under age 18 and 5.5% of those age 65 or over.

== Education ==
It is in the Galva Community Unit School District 224.

Black Hawk College, a community college, has one of its campus in the town.

== Community organizations ==
- Galva Arts Council
- Galva American Legion Post #45

== Notable people ==
- Reuben Beals, Illinois state representative, farmer, and carpenter.
- Rich Falk, professional basketball player.
- Rollin Kirby, a political cartoonist and three-time winner of the Pulitzer Prize.
