= Osceola Township, Stark County, Illinois =

Coordinates: 41°11′11″N 89°41′32″W

Osceola Township
- Township
- Location in Stark County

- Stark County's location in Illinois
- Country: United States
- State: Illinois
- County: Stark
- Established: November 2, 1852

Area
  - Total: 35.5 sq mi (92 km^{2})
  - Land: 35.49 sq mi (91.9 km^{2})
  - Water: 0.01 sq mi (0.026 km^{2}) 0.03%

Population (2010)
  - Estimate (2016): 971
  - Density: 28.6/sq mi (11.0/km^{2})
- Time zone: UTC-6 (CST)
  - Summer (DST): UTC-5 (CDT)
- FIPS code: 17-175-56783

Osceola Township is located in Stark County, Illinois. As of the 2010 census, its population was 1,014 and it contained 428 housing units.

== Geography ==
According to the 2010 census, the township has a total area of 35.5 square miles (92 km^{2}), of which 35.49 square miles (91.9 km^{2}) (or 99.97%) is land and 0.01 square miles (0.026 km^{2}) (or 0.03%) is water.

== Demographics ==
Historical population
Census	Pop.	Note	%±
2016 (est.)	971
U.S. Decennial Census
