= Stark County, Illinois =

County in Illinois, United States

- County
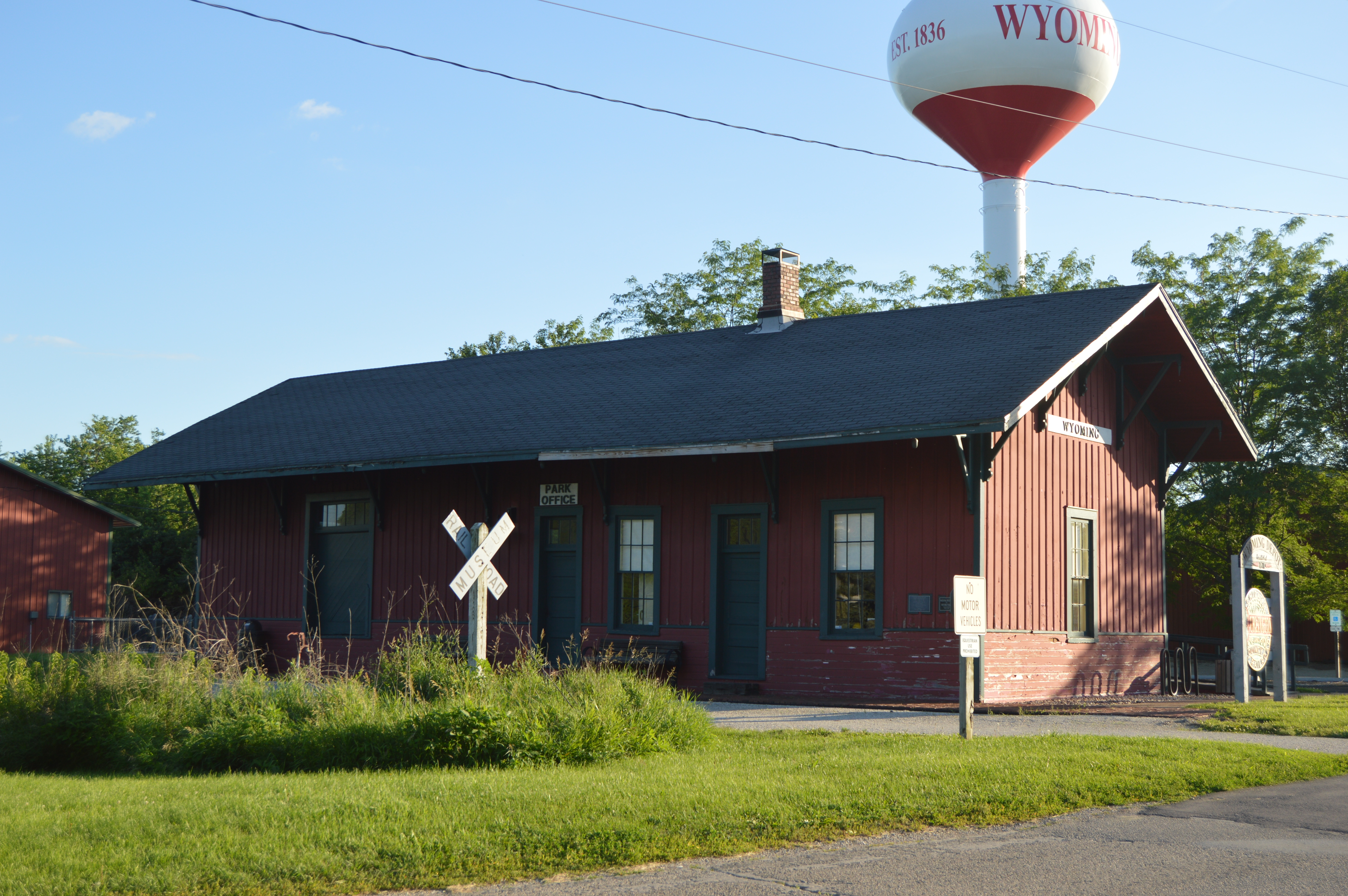
- Chicago, Burlington & Quincy Railroad Depot (Wyoming, Illinois)

- Location within the U.S. state of Illinois
- Coordinates: 41°05′N 89°47′W
- Country: United States
- State: Illinois
- Founded: 1839
- Named for: John Stark
- Seat: Toulon
- Largest city: Wyoming

Area
  - Total: 288 sq mi (750 km^{2})
  - Land: 288 sq mi (750 km^{2})
  - Water: 0.3 sq mi (0.78 km^{2}) 0.1%

Population (2020)
  - Total: 5,400
  - Estimate (2025): 5,319 ▼
  - Density: 19/sq mi (7.2/km^{2})
- Time zone: UTC−6 (Central)
  - Summer (DST): UTC−5 (CDT)
- Congressional district: 16th
- Website: www.starkco.illinois.gov

Stark County is a county in Illinois, United States. According to the 2020 census, it had a population of 5,400. Its county seat is Toulon. Stark County is part of the Peoria, Illinois, metropolitan area.

== History ==
Stark County was formed in 1839 out of Knox and Putnam counties. It was named for General Colonel John Stark, who served in the American Continental Army during the American Revolutionary War. He became known as the "Hero of Bennington" for his exemplary service at the Battle of Bennington in 1777.

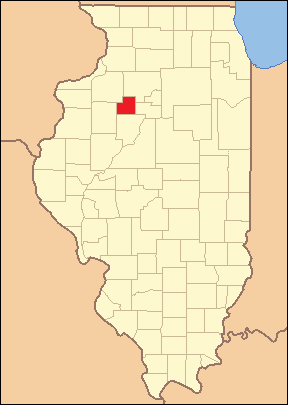
Stark County at the time of its creation in 1839

== Geography ==
According to the U.S. Census Bureau, the county has a total area of 288 square miles (750 km^{2}), of which 288 square miles (750 km^{2}) is land and 0.3 square miles (0.78 km^{2}) (0.1%) is water.

=== Climate and weather ===
Toulon, Illinois

Climate chart (precipitation, max. and min. temperature)
J	F	M	A	M	J	J	A	S	O	N	D
1.6 28 10	1.4 34 16	2.5 46 26	3.5 60 37	3.5 71 48	4.5 80 59	4 84 62	4.1 82 60	3 75 51	2.6 63 39	2.7 47 29	2.4 33 17
- █ Average max. and min. temperatures in °F
- █ Precipitation totals in inches
- Source: The Weather Channel
Metric conversion
J	F	M	A	M	J	J	A	S	O	N	D
39 −2 −12	36 1 −9	63 8 −3	88 16 3	90 22 9	113 27 15	101 29 17	105 28 16	77 24 11	65 17 4	70 8 −2	60 1 −8
- █ Average max. and min. temperatures in °C
- █ Precipitation totals in mm

In recent years, average temperatures in the county seat of Toulon have ranged from a low of 10 °F (−12 °C) in January to a high of 84 °F (29 °C) in July, although a record low of −26 °F (−32 °C) was recorded in January 1999 and a record high of 104 °F (40 °C) was recorded in July 1983. Average monthly precipitation ranged from 1.41 inches (36 mm) in February to 4.46 inches (113 mm) in June.

=== Major highways ===
- Illinois Route 17
- Illinois Route 18
- Illinois Route 40
- Illinois Route 78
- Illinois Route 91
- Illinois Route 93

=== Adjacent counties ===
- Henry County (northwest)
- Bureau County (north)
- Marshall County (east)
- Peoria County (south)
- Knox County (west)

== Demographics ==
Historical population
Census	Pop.	Note	%±
1840	1,573		—
1850	3,710		135.9%
1860	9,004		142.7%
1870	10,751		19.4%
1880	11,207		4.2%
1890	9,982		−10.9%
1900	10,186		2.0%
1910	10,098		−0.9%
1920	9,693		−4.0%
1930	9,184		−5.3%
1940	8,881		−3.3%
1950	8,721		−1.8%
1960	8,152		−6.5%
1970	7,510		−7.9%
1980	7,389		−1.6%
1990	6,534		−11.6%
2000	6,332		−3.1%
2010	5,994		−5.3%
2020	5,400		−9.9%
2025 (est.)	5,319	▼	−1.5%
U.S. Decennial Census; 1790-1960 1900-1990; 1990-2000 2010

=== 2020 census ===
As of the 2020 census, the county had a population of 5,400. The median age was 45.5 years, with 21.9% of residents under the age of 18 and 23.1% aged 65 or older. For every 100 females there were 97.9 males, and for every 100 females age 18 and over there were 96.2 males age 18 and over.

As of the 2020 census, the racial makeup of the county was 95.0% White, 0.3% Black or African American, 0.2% American Indian and Alaska Native, 0.4% Asian, less than 0.1% Native Hawaiian and Pacific Islander, 0.5% from some other race, and 3.5% from two or more races. Hispanic or Latino residents of any race comprised 2.4% of the population.

As of the 2020 census, less than 0.1% of residents lived in urban areas, while 100.0% lived in rural areas.

As of the 2020 census, there were 2,226 households in the county, of which 27.8% had children under the age of 18 living in them. Of all households, 50.5% were married-couple households, 19.0% were households with a male householder and no spouse or partner present, and 23.3% were households with a female householder and no spouse or partner present. About 29.2% of all households were made up of individuals and 14.3% had someone living alone who was 65 years of age or older.

As of the 2020 census, there were 2,577 housing units, of which 13.6% were vacant. Among occupied housing units, 79.5% were owner-occupied and 20.5% were renter-occupied. The homeowner vacancy rate was 1.6% and the rental vacancy rate was 17.9%.

=== Racial and ethnic composition ===
Stark County, Illinois – Racial and ethnic composition Note: the US Census treats Hispanic/Latino as an ethnic category. This table excludes Latinos from the racial categories and assigns them to a separate category. Hispanics/Latinos may be of any race.
Race / Ethnicity (NH = Non-Hispanic)	Pop 1980	Pop 1990	Pop 2000	Pop 2010	Pop 2020	% 1980	% 1990	% 2000	% 2010	% 2020
White alone (NH)	7,328	6,470	6,213	5,826	5,070	99.17%	99.02%	98.12%	97.20%	93.89%
Black or African American alone (NH)	4	5	4	28	17	0.05%	0.08%	0.06%	0.47%	0.31%
Native American or Alaska Native alone (NH)	11	8	10	9	8	0.15%	0.12%	0.16%	0.15%	0.15%
Asian alone (NH)	10	21	12	19	23	0.14%	0.32%	0.19%	0.32%	0.43%
Native Hawaiian or Pacific Islander alone (NH)	x	x	0	0	0	x	x	0.00%	0.00%	0.00%
Other race alone (NH)	1	0	0	1	5	0.01%	0.00%	0.00%	0.02%	0.09%
Mixed race or Multiracial (NH)	x	x	39	52	145	x	x	0.62%	0.87%	2.69%
Hispanic or Latino (any race)	35	30	54	59	132	0.47%	0.46%	0.85%	0.98%	2.44%
Total	7,389	6,534	6,332	5,994	5,400	100.00%	100.00%	100.00%	100.00%	100.00%

=== 2010 census ===
As of the 2010 census, there were 5,994 people, 2,425 households, and 1,673 families residing in the county. The population density was 20.8 inhabitants per square mile (8.0/km^{2}). There were 2,674 housing units at an average density of 9.3 per square mile (3.6/km^{2}). The racial makeup of the county was 97.7% white, 0.5% black or African American, 0.3% Asian, 0.2% American Indian, 0.3% from other races, and 1.0% from two or more races. Those of Hispanic or Latino origin made up 1.0% of the population. In terms of ancestry, 33.5% were German, 15.5% were Irish, 13.8% were English, 10.8% were American, and 9.8% were Swedish.

Of the 2,425 households, 28.9% had children under the age of 18 living with them, 56.6% were married couples living together, 8.0% had a female householder with no husband present, 31.0% were non-families, and 26.8% of all households were made up of individuals. The average household size was 2.43 and the average family size was 2.93. The median age was 43.8 years.

The median income for a household in the county was $49,195 and the median income for a family was $62,681. Males had a median income of $44,931 versus $29,621 for females. The per capita income for the county was $25,311. About 7.6% of families and 11.2% of the population were below the poverty line, including 17.0% of those under age 18 and 4.8% of those age 65 or over.

== Communities ==
=== Cities ===
- Toulon
- Wyoming

=== Villages ===
- Bradford
- La Fayette

=== Unincorporated communities ===
- Castleton
- Duncan
- Elmira
- Lombardville
- Modena
- Speer
- Stark

=== Townships ===
Stark County is divided into these townships:

- Elmira
- Essex
- Goshen
- Osceola
- Penn
- Toulon
- Valley
- West Jersey

== Politics ==
United States presidential election results for Stark County, Illinois
Year	Republican		Democratic		Third party(ies)	
Year	No.	%	No.	%	No.	%
1892	1,240	50.76%	824	33.73%	379	15.51%
1896	1,636	60.04%	1,030	37.80%	59	2.17%
1900	1,665	61.37%	939	34.61%	109	4.02%
1904	1,764	71.27%	574	23.19%	137	5.54%
1908	1,635	66.27%	738	29.91%	94	3.81%
1912	549	23.46%	669	28.59%	1,122	47.95%
1916	2,887	66.57%	1,390	32.05%	60	1.38%
1920	2,750	79.57%	661	19.13%	45	1.30%
1924	2,698	71.07%	784	20.65%	314	8.27%
1928	2,966	69.09%	1,306	30.42%	21	0.49%
1932	2,119	46.75%	2,369	52.26%	45	0.99%
1936	2,696	54.38%	2,220	44.78%	42	0.85%
1940	3,393	64.94%	1,818	34.79%	14	0.27%
1944	3,050	68.42%	1,401	31.43%	7	0.16%
1948	2,537	68.44%	1,163	31.37%	7	0.19%
1952	3,398	75.51%	1,100	24.44%	2	0.04%
1956	3,241	74.32%	1,118	25.64%	2	0.05%
1960	2,925	67.80%	1,383	32.06%	6	0.14%
1964	2,117	54.38%	1,776	45.62%	0	0.00%
1968	2,292	62.54%	1,128	30.78%	245	6.68%
1972	2,529	71.44%	993	28.05%	18	0.51%
1976	2,191	63.34%	1,146	33.13%	122	3.53%
1980	2,358	69.76%	806	23.85%	216	6.39%
1984	2,228	67.15%	1,072	32.31%	18	0.54%
1988	1,841	58.39%	1,274	40.41%	38	1.21%
1992	1,384	41.30%	1,336	39.87%	631	18.83%
1996	1,278	44.62%	1,262	44.06%	324	11.31%
2000	1,694	56.67%	1,211	40.52%	84	2.81%
2004	1,841	60.14%	1,189	38.84%	31	1.01%
2008	1,513	51.83%	1,357	46.49%	49	1.68%
2012	1,528	57.40%	1,095	41.13%	39	1.47%
2016	1,778	64.82%	751	27.38%	214	7.80%
2020	2,004	69.44%	815	28.24%	67	2.32%
2024	1,983	71.72%	725	26.22%	57	2.06%

Since the American Civil War, Stark County has been heavily Republican, like most of Yankee-influenced Northern Illinois. The only Democratic presidential nominee to carry Stark County in the past 150 years has been Franklin D. Roosevelt in 1932, although Bob Dole won by just sixteen votes against Bill Clinton in 1996, and Progressive Theodore Roosevelt won the county in 1912 when the Republican Party was mortally divided between Roosevelt and conservative incumbent William Howard Taft.

== Education ==
School districts include:

- Bradford Community Unit School District 1
- Princeville Community Unit School District 326
- Stark County Community Unit School District 100
- Wethersfield Community Unit School District 230
- Williamsfield Community Unit School District 210

== See also ==
- National Register of Historic Places listings in Stark County
