= Bradford, Illinois =

- Village
- Motto: "A modern village with old-fashioned values"
- Location of Bradford in Stark County, Illinois.
- Coordinates: 41°10′38″N 89°39′30″W
- Country: United States
- State: Illinois
- County: Stark

Area
  - Total: 0.40 sq mi (1.03 km^{2})
  - Land: 0.40 sq mi (1.03 km^{2})
  - Water: 0 sq mi (0.00 km^{2})
- Elevation: 810 ft (250 m)

Population (2020)
  - Total: 676
  - Density: 1,697.0/sq mi (655.21/km^{2})
- Time zone: UTC-6 (CST)
  - Summer (DST): UTC-5 (CDT)
- Zip code: 61421
- Area code: 309
- FIPS code: 17-07692
- GNIS feature ID: 2398162
- Website: bradfordil.com

Bradford is a village in Stark County, Illinois, United States. As of the 2020 census, Bradford had a population of 676. Bradford is part of the Peoria, Illinois Metropolitan Statistical Area.

== History ==
Bradford was laid out in 1863, and incorporated in 1869. The Dixon, Peoria and Hannibal Railroad passed through Bradford, and the settlement was "located on very high ground, overlooking fertile farms in all directions." The population was over 500 in 1876.

Bradford was a part of the 1937 - 1947 USDA, AAA historical aerial photography collection as well as the 1955 - 1980 statewide USDA collection.

== Geography ==
According to the 2010 census, Bradford has a total area of 0.4 square miles (1.04 km^{2}), all land.

== Demographics ==
Historical population
Census	Pop.	Note	%±
1870	280		—
1880	506		80.7%
1890	604		19.4%
1900	773		28.0%
1910	770		−0.4%
1920	915		18.8%
1930	951		3.9%
1940	907		−4.6%
1950	952		5.0%
1960	857		−10.0%
1970	885		3.3%
1980	924		4.4%
1990	678		−26.6%
2000	787		16.1%
2010	768		−2.4%
2020	676		−12.0%
U.S. Decennial Census

As of the census of 2000, there were 787 people, 318 households, and 225 families residing in the village. The population density was 1,984.8 inhabitants per square mile (766.3/km^{2}). There were 352 housing units at an average density of 887.8 per square mile (342.8/km^{2}). The racial makeup of the village was 98.73% White, 0.13% Native American, 0.51% Asian, 0.51% from other races, and 0.13% from two or more races. Hispanic or Latino of any race were 1.02% of the population.

There were 318 households, out of which 32.4% had children under the age of 18 living with them, 57.5% were married couples living together, 9.7% had a female householder with no husband present, and 29.2% were non-families. 27.7% of all households were made up of individuals, and 17.0% had someone living alone who was 65 years of age or older. The average household size was 2.47 and the average family size was 2.96.

In the village, the population was spread out, with 27.2% under the age of 18, 6.7% from 18 to 24, 24.9% from 25 to 44, 23.6% from 45 to 64, and 17.5% who were 65 years of age or older. The median age was 38 years. For every 100 females, there were 86.9 males. For every 100 females age 18 and over, there were 81.9 males.

The median income for a household in the village was $33,750, and the median income for a family was $41,000. Males had a median income of $35,333 versus $21,324 for females. The per capita income for the village was $16,279. About 6.2% of families and 9.8% of the population were below the poverty line, including 11.4% of those under age 18 and 9.8% of those age 65 or over.

== Education ==
It is in the Bradford Community Unit School District 1. Bradford School District now has two schools in the village, Bradford Jr. High and Bradford Grade School.

Bradford High School was deactivated on July 1, 2001, and was scheduled to become the Jr. High. As of 2001 the high school students have their choice of attending one of three high schools: Stark County High School, Henry-Senachwine High School, or Bureau Valley High School.

From the mid-19th century there was St. John Catholic Grade School which was closed in 1968.

Boy Scout Troop 1851 is in Bradford.

== Notable people ==
- Eva Katherine Clapp (1857–1916), writer of novels, short stories, and poems
- C. W. Whitten (1871–1957), educator and athletic administrator, was born near Bradford.
