= Peoria and Rock Island Railroad =

The Peoria and Rock Island Railroad was a railroad of 91-mile (146 km) in length, located in the U.S. state of Illinois. It provided service between the two cities listed in its corporate name. Chartered on March 7, 1867, it was built between 1867 and 1871 and first provided passenger service between these two cities on July 8, 1871. The railroad is best known for being the right-of-way for the 26-mile (42 km) Rock Island Trail State Park, a rail trail conversion.

== History ==
The Peoria and Rock Island (P & RI) was built during the post-American Civil War 1860s, a period of substantial railroad development, especially in the victorious Northern states. Although both Peoria, Illinois and Rock Island, Illinois are located on navigable waterways and enjoyed substantial freight traffic by steamboat, there would be no direct water connection between the Upper Mississippi River and the Illinois River until the construction of the Hennepin Canal in 1907. The Peoria and Rock Island went into foreclosure and, for legal purposes, changed its name to the Rock Island and Peoria Railway in October 1877.

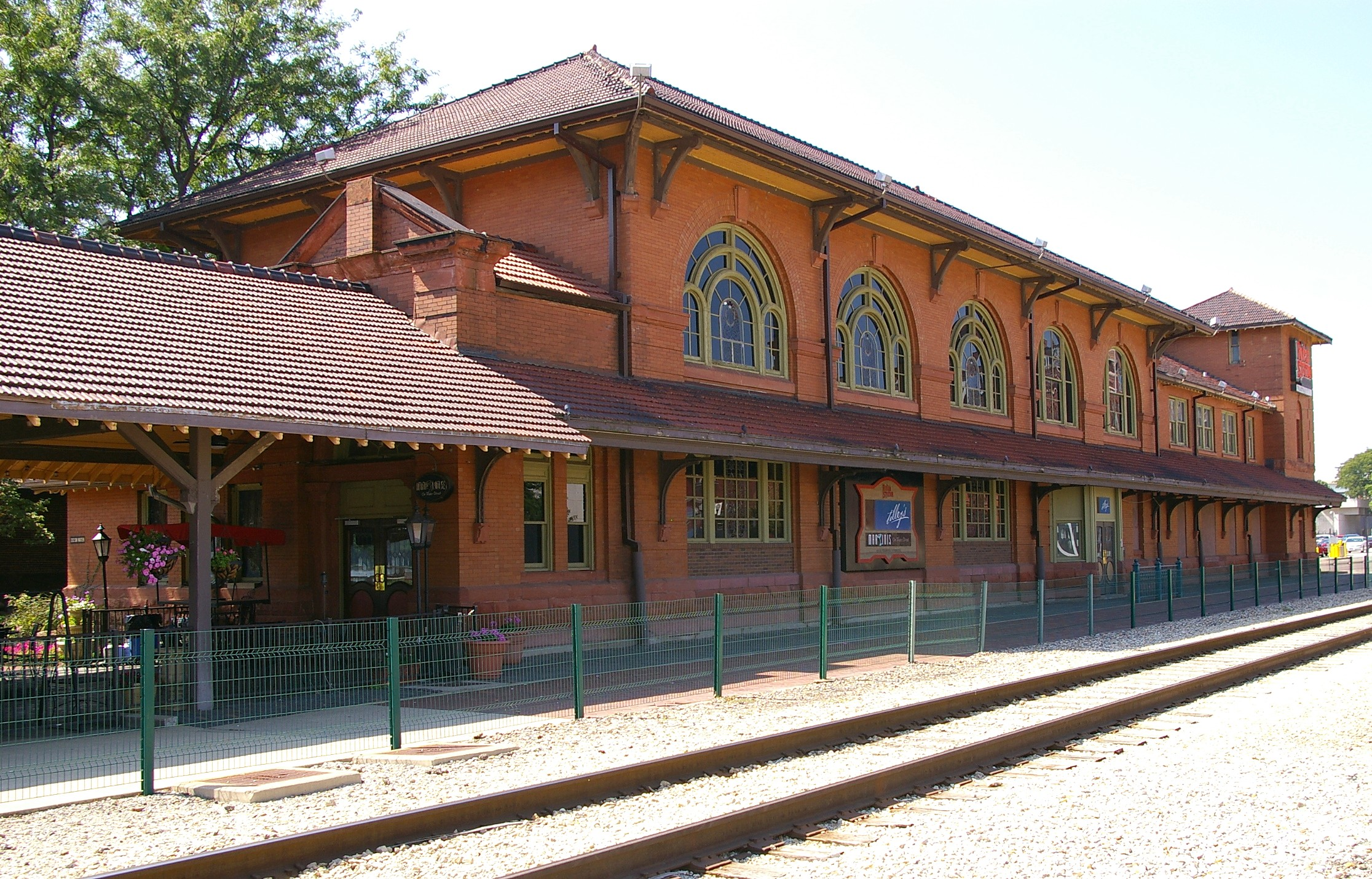
Depot used by Rock Island as Peoria terminus

The largest railroad serving Rock Island was the Chicago, Rock Island and Pacific, a multi-state railroad. The 1877 foreclosure drew the Rock Island and Peoria into the orbit of the CRI & P. On June 11, 1903, the former P & RI became a branch line of the larger transportation company. As a branch line, the P & RI specialized in the transportation of freight from the "Rock Island's" Great Plains service area to Peoria. During the early years of the 20th century, distilleries in Peoria manufactured a significant share of U.S. produced blended whiskey. Carloads of small grains such as rye and barley rumbled southeastward on the former Peoria and Rock Island to the fermentation vats.

The enactment of American Prohibition in 1919, together with the invention of the mass-produced automobile, dealt the former Peoria and Rock Island a blow from which it could not recover. In 1940, the northernmost section of the line, a segment from Milan to Orion, was abandoned in favor of traffic rights on the CB & Q from Colona to Orion. The Rock Island railroad began to shut down its Peoria branch line in 1963. While that section of the P & RI that stretches from Peoria north to Toulon, Illinois became a public trail in 1989, the northern section of the same right-of-way, between Toulon and Orion, was liquidated into the hands of adjacent landowners in the private sector.

== See also ==
- Minneapolis and St. Louis Railway, a railroad that competed with the P & RI in the freightage of grain to Peoria.
