= Dixon, Peoria and Hannibal Railroad =

Railroad in Illinois, United States

Overview
- Main region(s): Illinois, US
- Dates of operation: 1867–1899 -->
- Successor: Chicago, Burlington and Quincy Railroad

Technical
- Track gauge: 1,435 mm (4 ft 8 1/2 in)
- Length: 44.6-mile (71.8 km)
- No. of tracks: one

The Dixon, Peoria and Hannibal Railroad was a 44.6-mile (71.8 km) railroad in Illinois, United States.

== History ==
The company was incorporated in 1867 by a Special Act of the Illinois Legislature.

Known as the "Buda branch", the standard-gauge, single-track, steam railroad line connected to the Chicago, Burlington and Quincy Railroad line in Buda, Illinois, and ran south to Elmwood, Illinois, with no branch lines. The company did not operate the line it constructed; it leased it to the Chicago, Burlington and Quincy Railroad in 1869, and the line opened for traffic in 1870. The corporate records for the company were destroyed in the Great Chicago Fire of 1871. In 1899, the company deeded all its property to the Chicago, Burlington and Quincy Railroad.
