= Wyoming, Illinois =

- City
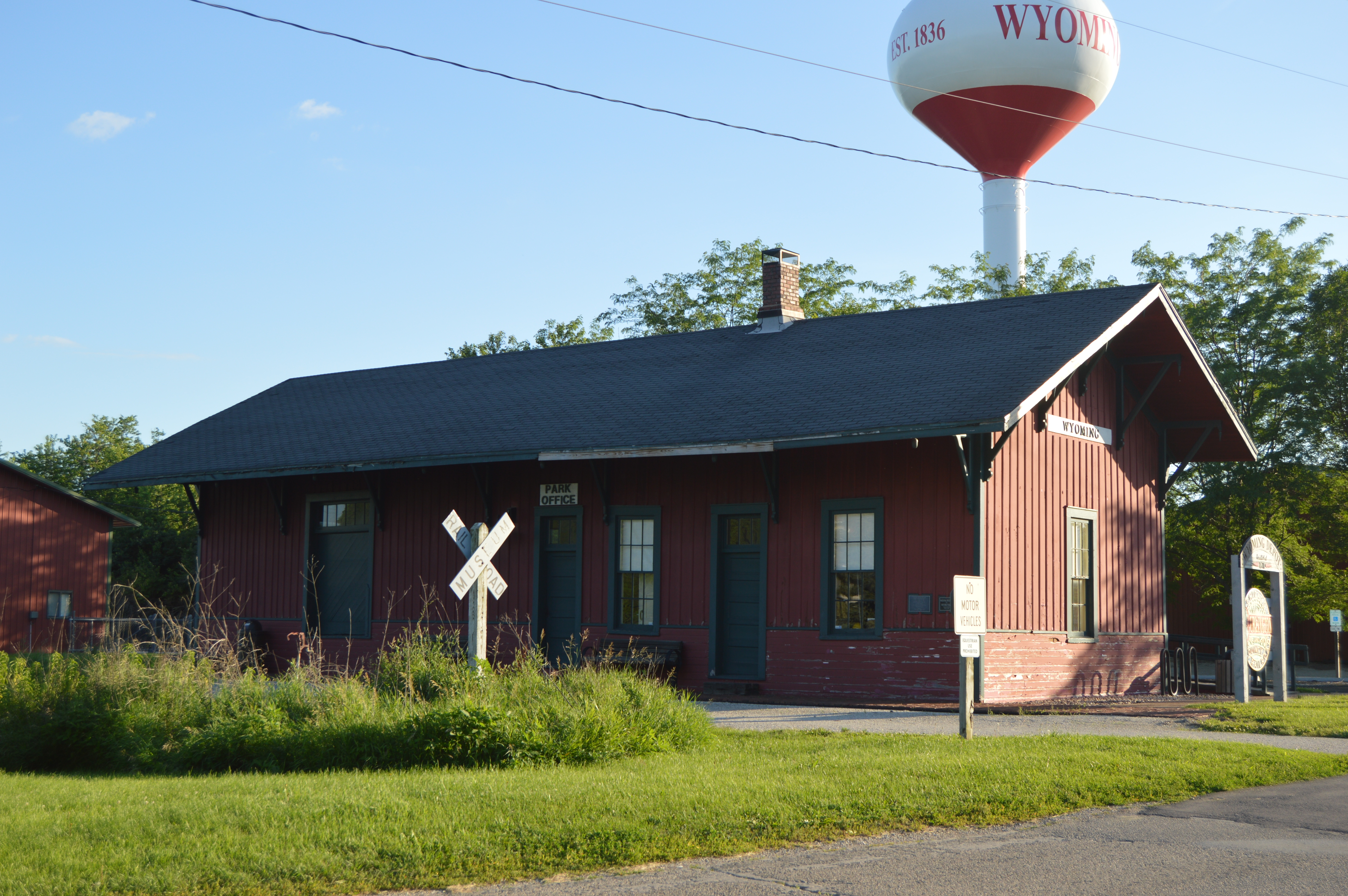
- The former CB&Q depot

- Location of Wyoming in Stark County, Illinois.
- Coordinates: 41°03′50″N 89°46′22″W
- Country: United States
- State: Illinois
- County: Stark

Government
  - Mayor: Jim Mercer

Area
  - Total: 0.85 sq mi (2.21 km^{2})
  - Land: 0.840 sq mi (2.176 km^{2})
  - Water: 0.0100 sq mi (0.0259 km^{2})
- Elevation: 705 ft (215 m)

Population (2020)
  - Total: 1,300
  - Density: 1,521.6/sq mi (587.51/km^{2})
- Time zone: UTC-6 (CST)
  - Summer (DST): UTC-5 (CDT)
- ZIP code: 61491
- Area code: 309
- FIPS code: 17-83687
- GNIS feature ID: 2397387
- Website: cityofwyoming.com

Wyoming is a city in Stark County, Illinois, United States. As of the 2020 census, Wyoming had a population of 1,300. It is the headquarters of the Rock Island Trail State Park. Wyoming is part of the Peoria, Illinois Metropolitan Statistical Area. The former CB&Q Railroad depot in town is the Rock Island Trail State Park's headquarters.

== History ==
The city of Wyoming was founded on May 3, 1836, by General Samuel Thomas, a veteran of the War of 1812. Thomas was born in 1787 and died in 1879. He is buried in the Wyoming City Cemetery where a plaque below his stone denotes that he was the founder and benefactor of the town of Wyoming. The main city park in Wyoming is Thomas Park; there is also a Thomas Street in honor of General Thomas. Samuel Thomas as well as many of the other early settlers came from the state of Pennsylvania. It is for the Wyoming Valley in Pennsylvania that the city is named.

Stark County is rural, consisting mostly of farm land. The county was established on March 2, 1839, and named for John Stark, a soldier of the French and Indian wars and a Major General of the Continental Army during the American Revolution, serving with great distinction at Bunker Hill, Trenton, Princeton, and Bennington.

Wyoming is the largest community in Stark County, with 1,258 people as of the 2010 census. The other principal villages are Toulon, Bradford, Lafayette, Castleton, Camp Grove, West Jersey, Duncan, Stark, Speer, Milo, Elmira, Osceola, and Modena. Toulon is the county seat, and an historic courthouse is sited there.

== Geography ==
According to the 2010 census, Wyoming has a total area of 0.84 square miles (2.18 km^{2}), all land.

Wyoming is located from its southernmost point about half a mile from the Spoon River. Wyoming has no major waterways running through the city, however, there are two small unnamed creeks that run through the south area of town, one runs through the Wyoming Cemetery and feeds into the other, which also feeds into the Spoon River

Wyoming is a mostly flat town. It has a few hills, but nothing major. Surrounding the town is dense farmland and lots of hills.

== Landmarks ==
Wyoming features a historic downtown that reflects the town's heritage and local pride. Murals depicting the town's founding in 1836, the Rock Island Railroad, and early 20th-century street scenes adorn the side of a prominent downtown building, highlighting key moments in local history. Another eye-catching mural appears on the upper façade of the historic Paramount Theater, showcasing classic Hollywood actors in tribute to the theater's cinematic past. The downtown area also features a vintage-style street clock, serving as a visual landmark and a nod to early 20th-century small-town design. Among the town's tallest structures is the First Congregational Church, known for its steep, pointed tower which makes it a local landmark. However, the tallest full-height building in town is a grain elevator complex located on East Williams Street near Duryea Park. Rock Island Trail State Park also passes through Wyoming, bringing cyclists and hikers into town and connecting the community to regional outdoor recreation.

== Demographics ==
Historical population
Census	Pop.	Note	%±
1870	640		—
1880	1,086		69.7%
1890	1,116		2.8%
1900	1,277		14.4%
1910	1,506		17.9%
1920	1,376		−8.6%
1930	1,408		2.3%
1940	1,360		−3.4%
1950	1,496		10.0%
1960	1,559		4.2%
1970	1,563		0.3%
1980	1,614		3.3%
1990	1,462		−9.4%
2000	1,424		−2.6%
2010	1,429		0.4%
2020	1,300		−9.0%
U.S. Decennial Census

=== 2020 census ===
As of the 2020 census, Wyoming had a population of 1,300. The median age was 44.5 years. 21.5% of residents were under the age of 18 and 23.3% of residents were 65 years of age or older. For every 100 females there were 90.6 males, and for every 100 females age 18 and over there were 91.0 males age 18 and over.

0.0% of residents lived in urban areas, while 100.0% lived in rural areas.

There were 571 households in Wyoming, of which 25.6% had children under the age of 18 living in them. Of all households, 43.1% were married-couple households, 19.4% were households with a male householder and no spouse or partner present, and 29.8% were households with a female householder and no spouse or partner present. About 34.2% of all households were made up of individuals and 16.7% had someone living alone who was 65 years of age or older.

There were 656 housing units, of which 13.0% were vacant. The homeowner vacancy rate was 1.1% and the rental vacancy rate was 23.2%.

Racial composition as of the 2020 census
Race	Number	Percent
White	1,234	94.9%
Black or African American	7	0.5%
American Indian and Alaska Native	0	0.0%
Asian	13	1.0%
Native Hawaiian and Other Pacific Islander	0	0.0%
Some other race	1	0.1%
Two or more races	45	3.5%
Hispanic or Latino (of any race)	30	2.3%

=== 2000 census ===
As of the census of 2000, there were 1,424 people, 629 households, and 408 families residing in the city. The population density was 1,918.1 inhabitants per square mile (740.6/km^{2}). There were 669 housing units at an average density of 901.2 per square mile (348.0/km^{2}). The racial makeup of the city was 99.09% White, 0.21% Asian, and 0.70% from two or more races. Hispanic or Latino of any race were 0.07% of the population.

There were 629 households, out of which 26.1% had children under the age of 18 living with them, 53.1% were married couples living together, 8.9% had a female householder with no husband present, and 35.1% were non-families. 32.1% of all households were made up of individuals, and 17.6% had someone living alone who was 65 years of age or older. The average household size was 2.26 and the average family size was 2.84.

In the city, the population was spread out, with 22.3% under the age of 18, 7.7% from 18 to 24, 24.4% from 25 to 44, 23.9% from 45 to 64, and 21.6% who were 65 years of age or older. The median age was 42 years. For every 100 females, there were 85.7 males. For every 100 females age 18 and over, there were 84.0 males.

The median income for a household in the city was $30,463, and the median income for a family was $41,797. Males had a median income of $30,074 versus $22,115 for females. The per capita income for the city was $16,574. About 9.1% of families and 10.6% of the population were below the poverty line, including 13.5% of those under age 18 and 7.1% of those age 65 or over.

== Events ==
Spoon River Days
Held annually in July at the Stark County Junior Fairgrounds in Wyoming, Spoon River Days is a community celebration featuring a mix of live entertainment, food and craft vendors, games, and family-friendly activities. The event typically draws visitors from across the region and is a highlight of the summer for local residents.

Wyoming Fall Festival
The Fall Festival takes place each September, at Thomas Park. The event includes seasonal attractions such as craft booths, local food, children's activities, contests, and live music. It serves as a way for the community to come together and celebrate the harvest season and local traditions.

Wyoming Car Cruise In
The Wyoming Car Cruise-In is an annual automotive event held in downtown Wyoming, typically in mid to late August. The event features a large gathering of classic cars, muscle cars, and other vehicles, which are displayed along the main streets of the downtown area. Visitors can view and photograph the cars throughout the day, while local vendors provide food at the historic Paramount Theater. The event traditionally concludes with a series of burnouts performed by participating vehicles.

== Parks ==
Thomas Park is Wyoming's main city park. There are also two other parks, Duryea Park and North East Park. Thomas Park Includes a large playground, three pavilions, a basketball court, and a small stage. Duryea Park includes a small playground, a pavilion and a large softball diamond. North East Park includes a large baseball diamond and open grass space for various activities.

== Education ==
It is within the Stark County Community Unit School District 100.

Stark County Elementary School and Stark County Community Unit School District 100 offices are located in Wyoming.

The district's comprehensive high school is Stark County High School in Toulon.

== Notable people ==
- J. Frank Duryea and brother Charles: designed the first gasoline-powered automobile built in the USA.
- Kirke La Shelle, Wyoming born journalist, playwright and theatrical producer.
- Harry Everett Townsend, served as a war artist with the United States Army during the First World War.
- Theo Von, comedian and podcaster. Spent time in Wyoming as a child.
