= James Tito =

New Zealand actor and musician

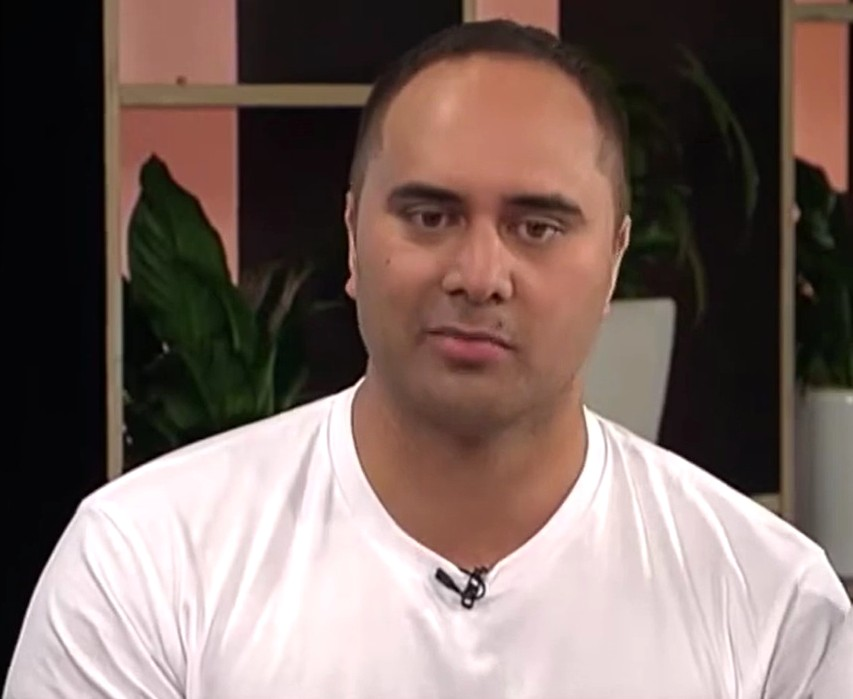
- Tito in 2017

Background information
- Born: Taupō, New Zealand
- Genres: Māori Showband, comedy, drama, theatre
- Occupations: actor, musician
- Instruments: vocals, guitar

James Tito is a New Zealand actor and musician. Tito is also a founding member of Māori showband the Modern Māori Quartet. He co-wrote and performed songs, with the other band members, for the Modern Māori Quartet's debut album That's Us! (2017).

Tito co-hosted Māori Television's My Party Song as part of the 'Modern Māori Quartet.

== Early life ==
Tito was born in Taupō, New Zealand and is of Māori Ngāti Tūwharetoa, Ngāpuhi, Kūki 'Āirani (Cook Islands) ] descent. James is a graduate of Toi Whakaari: New Zealand Drama School (Te Kura Toi Whakaari ō Aotearoa) earning a Bachelor of Performing Arts (Acting) in 2010.

== Career ==
=== Theatre ===
Tito performed in the theatre show Awhi Tapu(2011) with future bandmate Matariki Whatarau. In 2012, Tito played Diomedes/Taiomete, in the te reo Māori version of Troilus and Cressida at the Globe Theatre, in London, alongside fellow Toi Whakaari graduates and Modern Māori Quartet bandmates, Maaka Pohatu (Ajax) and Matu Ngaropo (Achilles).

=== Music ===
Tito is a member of Māori showband the Modern Māori Quartet, alongside Maaka Pohatu, Matariki Whatarau and Francis Kora.

=== Film and television ===
Tito, and the other members of the Modern Māori Quartet, served as the in-house band on Māori television's variety show, Happy Hour (2014). He also acted in some of the shows comedy sketches. Tito had a supporting role in the films Mahana (2016) and Whina (2022), In 2019, James made an appearance on TVNZ's long running series, Shortland Street. In 2025, Tito appeared in the Three drama TV series Tangata Pai.

== Discography ==
- Happy Hour (2014)
- That's Us! (2017)
