= Modern Māori Quartet =

New Zealand showband musical group

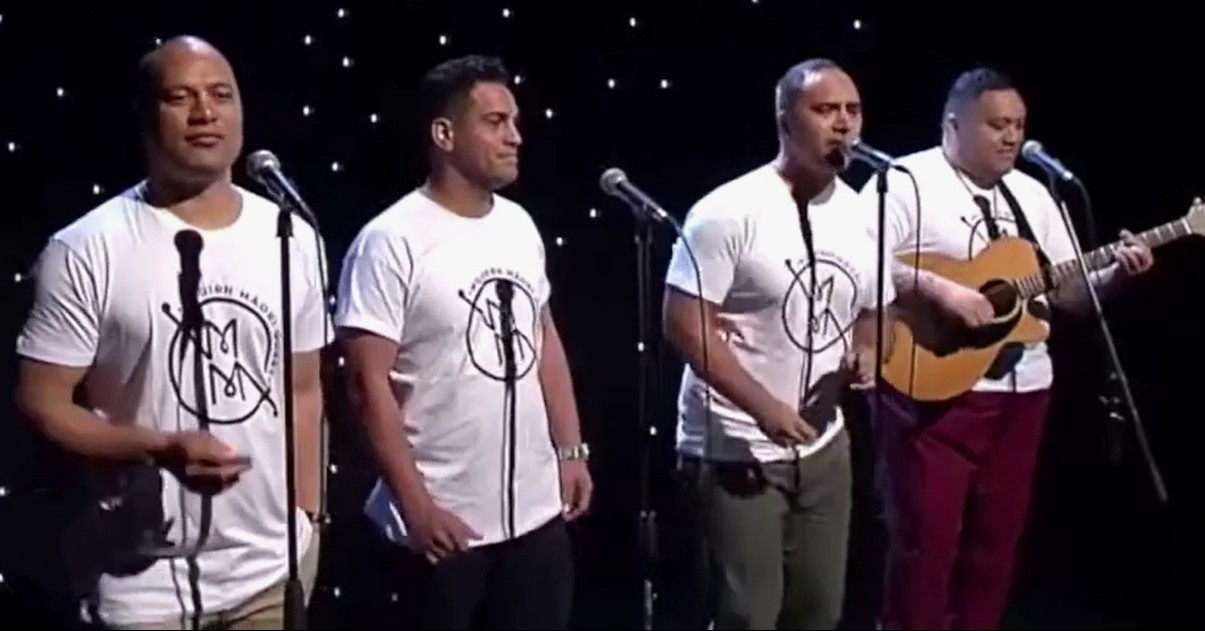
- The Modern Māori Quartet performing in 2017; left to right: Francis Kora, Matariki Whatarau, James Tito, Maaka Pohatu

Background information
- Origin: New Zealand
- Genres: Māori showband
- Years active: 2010–present
- Members: James Tito; Matariki Whatarau; Maaka Pohatu; Francis Kora
- Website: modernmaoriquartet.nz

The Modern Māori Quartet (MMQ) is a showband musical group from New Zealand. The group comprises core members James Tito, Matariki Whatarau, Maaka Pohatu and Francis Kora, with occasional rotation of the lineup depending on availability of the performers or to allow simultaneous tours. Founding member Matu Ngaropo shifted from performing to acting as the group's musical director/dramaturg. Other performers who had been part of the group include Rutene Spooner, Tainui Kuru and Jamie McCaskill.

The group aims to put a contemporary spin on Māori showbands of earlier decades such as the Howard Morrison Quartet and the Maori Volcanics Showband, as well as capturing the spirit of the Māori "garage party". They formed in 2010 after the original members met at Toi Whakaari drama school.

They were invited to the 10th Sharq Taronalari International Music Festival (2015) in Samarkand, Uzbekistan, where they won an award for 'Most Daring & Emotional Performance'. On this tour they also performed in Singapore and in Selangor, Malaysia.

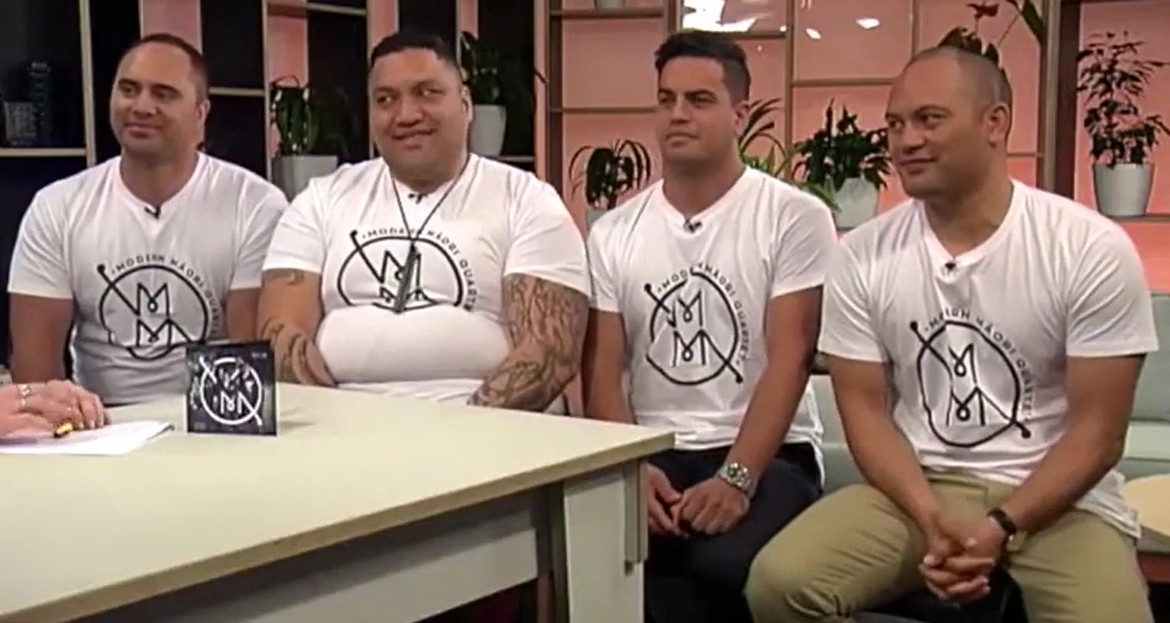
The Modern Māori Quartet in 2017. Left to right: James Tito, Maaka Pohatu, Matariki Whatarau, Francis Kora.

The Modern Māori Quartet have performed at festivals and venues throughout New Zealand and internationally including the Salisbury International Arts Festival in 2016 where they had a New Zealand focus. Other places in the UK include St John’s Smith Square (London), Komedia (Brighton) and Norwegian Church Arts Centre (Cardiff).

Other tour locations have been Festival of Voices (Hobart), Hawaii Theatre Center (Honolulu), Maui Arts & Cultural Center, Kahilu Theatre (Hawaii Island), Hard Rock Café (Sentosa Island, Singapore), Empire Cinema (Rarotonga), New Zealand Festival (Wellington) and Māoriland Film Festival (Ōtaki).

In 2014, the group had a legal dispute with their former manager, Teresa Brown, who had trademarked the name "The Modern Māori Quartet" in 2013, a month after her relationship with the band had ended. In 2017, the Intellectual Property Office of New Zealand invalidated Brown's trademark registration as having been made in bad faith.
