= Warren's Vortex =

New Zealand television series

- Genre: Science fiction comedy; Fantasy; Science fiction
- Created by: Nick Ward; Paul Yates
- Written by: Rosie Howells; Dana Leaming; Jamie McCaskill; Tom Sainsbury; Nick Ward; Paul Yates
- Directed by: Tim Van Dammen; Jason Stutter
- Starring: Maaka Pohatu; Milo Cawthorne; Louise Jiang; Millen Baird
- Theme music composer: MONIKER
- Country of origin: New Zealand
- Original language: English
- No. of seasons: 1
- No. of episodes: 6

Production
- Producers: Paul Yates; Michelle Turner
- Production locations: Lower Hutt, Wellington, NZ
- Cinematography: Simon Tutty
- Camera setup: Single-camera
- Running time: 6 x 23 minutes
- Production company: Kitchen Table Productions (WV) Limited

Original release
- Network: TVNZ 2
- Release: 24 August – 28 September 2025

Related
- Wellington Paranormal; What We Do in the Shadows

Warren's Vortex is a New Zealand science fiction comedy television series which screened on TVNZ 2 between 24 August 2025 and 28 September 2025. The series is in the same vein as the 2018 television series Wellington Paranormal, which itself is a spin-off of the 2014 film What We Do in the Shadows. Unlike either of those productions, this series is a single camera narrative comedy.

The actor Maaka Pohatu, who has the title role of Warren, previously appeared as Police Sergeant Ruawai Maaka in Wellington Paranormal.

== Premise ==
Warren Harrison is a husband and father, living in suburban Lower Hutt, New Zealand, who happens to have an interdimensional vortex in his shed. For the past twenty years, Warren has used it mainly to get rid of his garden rubbish.

Lucy, his 18-year-old daughter, is sucked into the vortex and Warren follows her. The pair travel to a series of different future realities. Several of the supporting cast play variations of their same character in different timelines.

== Production history ==
The series was created by Nick Ward and Paul Yates, both of whom were involved with Wellington Paranormal as directors and writers. In July 2024, NZ On Air was announced that the production would receive $1,227,000 of funding, though the New Zealand Listener later gave the amount as $1,465.000. Filming took place over the 2024–25 Christmas and New Year period across Lower Hutt. The main characters' house was filmed on location in Fairfield, with other locations including Kelson, Naenae, Taitā, and the Avalon studios.

== Cast ==
=== Main ===
- Maaka Pohatu as Warren Harrison
- Louise Jiang as Lucy Harrison (Warren's daughter)
- Kali Kopae as Hine Harrison (Warren's wife)
- Ginette McDonald as Mrs Schrödinger (the Harrisons' neighbour)
- Sophie Hambleton as Laurel, a family friend
- Cohen Holloway as Muzz, Laurel's estranged husband
- Tinorawe Hawkins as Bo, Laurel and Muzz's teenage son
- Millen Baird as Inspector Phil
- Milo Cawthorne as Darren
- Mayen Mehta as Ian
- John Bach as the Narrator

=== Guest ===
- Hilary Barry as Empress Gold (voice role)
- Peter Hambleton as Stanky Steve
- Tanea Heke as Aunty Marama
- Liz Wyatt as Mombie

== Episodes ==
No. overall	No. in series	Title	Directed by	Written by	Original release date
1	1	"Desolation of Smugg"	Tim van Dammen	Paul Yates	24 August 2025
Everyman Warren and his daughter Lucy are hurled through time to a world where intelligent refrigerators have taken over.
2	2	"Detached from Reality"	Jason Stutter	Dana Leaming	31 August 2025
Warren and Lucy land in a world where every Kiwi backyard has been turned into a reality TV competition and the stakes are high: you lose, you die!
3	3	"Unreal Estate"	Tim Van Dammen	Rosie Howells	7 September 2025
Warren and Lucy arrive in a world where all the houses are unaffordable and empty, and the real estate agents are laser-eyed robots with familiar faces.
4	4	"Mombified"	Jason Stutter	Jamie McCaskill	14 September 2025
Warren and Lucy return to their street to find everyone zombified by a mobile game. With the help of Darren and a guitar, they fight to snap everyone out of it.
5	5	"Mystery at Schrodinger Hall"	Tim Van Dammen	Nick Ward	21 September 2025
Warren and Lucy land in a 1930s murder mystery time loop. With reality fraying and tension rising, the real mystery becomes how to escape it all.
6	6	"Lost Forward"	Jason Stutter	Tom Sainsbury	28 September 2025
Warren and Lucy land in a cultured, rugby-free utopia. But when Warren reintroduces the sport, chaos erupts, landing him on death row.

== Broadcast ==
The series began broadcasting on TVNZ 2 on 24 August 2025, with catch-up availability on TVNZ's streaming service TVNZ+.

== See also ==
- Sliders – TV series featuring a similar plot device
- Time Bandits – a film also featuring time travel
