= Maaka Pohatu =

New Zealand actor and musician

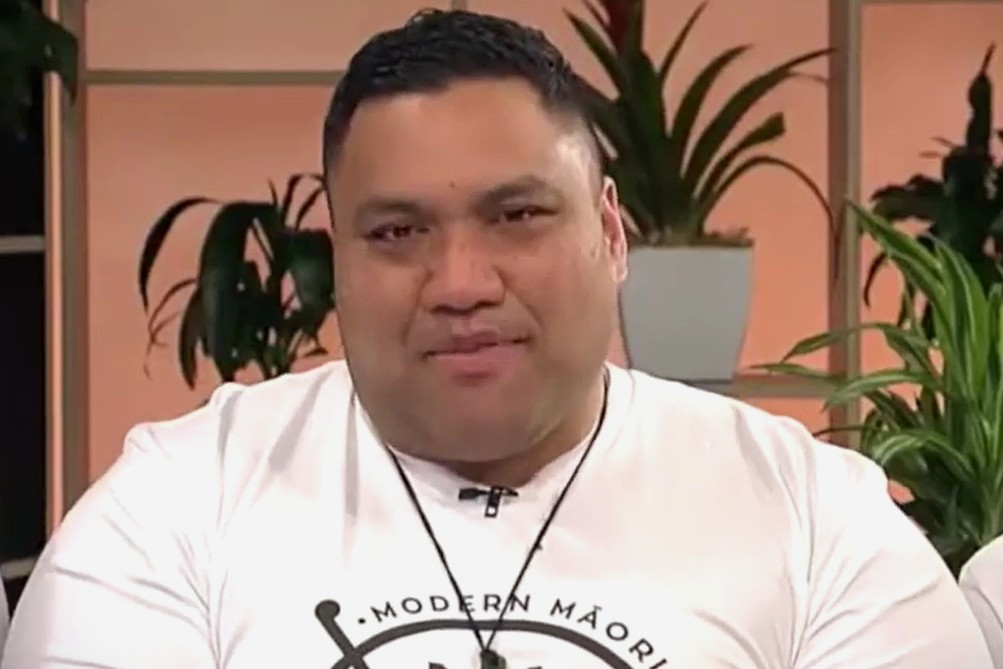
- Pohatu in 2017

Background information
- Born: Dunedin, New Zealand
- Genres: Māori Showband, comedy, drama, theatre
- Occupations: Actor, musician
- Instruments: Guitar, vocals

Maaka Pohatu is a New Zealand actor and musician. He is also a founding member of Māori showband the Modern Māori Quartet. He co-wrote and performed songs, with the other band members, for the Modern Māori Quartet's debut album That's Us! (2017).

Pohatu co-stars on the New Zealand mockumentary comedy horror television series Wellington Paranormal, part of the What We Do in the Shadows franchise. In 2018, Pohatu, along with other members of Modern Māori Quartet, began touring their cabaret show Modern Māori Quartet: Two Worlds. Pohatu co-hosted Māori Television's My Party Song as part of the Modern Māori Quartet. He had featured roles in the films Two Little Boys (2012) and Poi E (2016).

== Early life ==
Pohatu was born in Dunedin, New Zealand and is of Māori (Ngāi Tāmanuhiri, Ngāti Apa, Ngāti Tūwharetoa) descent. He is a graduate of Toi Whakaari: New Zealand Drama School (Te Kura Toi Whakaari ō Aotearoa), earning a Bachelor of Performing Arts (Acting) in 2005.

== Career ==
=== Theatre ===
Pohatu performed as Ajax in the te reo Māori version of Troilus and Cressida at the Globe Theatre in London, alongside fellow Toi Whakaari graduates and Modern Māori Quartet bandmates, James Tito (Diomedes) and Matu Ngaropo (Achilles). In January 2020, Pohatu performed in Modern Māori Quartet: Two Worlds at the Off-Broadway theatre, SoHo Playhouse.

=== Film and television ===
Pohatu made his movie debut as Gav, flatmate to Bret McKenzie's character, in Two Little Boys (2012). He portrayed Dalvanius Prime, the Māori musical legend behind the 1984 te reo Māori hit "Poi E", in the film Poi E (2016). Pohatu, and the other members of the Modern Māori Quartet, served as the in-house band on Māori television’s variety show, Happy Hour (2014). He also acted in some of the show's comedy sketches. He plays the role of Sergeant Ruawai Maaka on Wellington Paranormal, the New Zealand television spin-off of Taika Waititi and Jemaine Clement's mockumentary What We Do in the Shadows. In 2024 he appeared in The Rule of Jenny Pen.

In 2025, he had the title role of Warren Harrison in the science fiction comedy series Warren's Vortex. He had a guest role in the premiere episode of Blue Murder Motel.

=== Music ===
Pohatu is a member of the Māori showband the Modern Māori Quartet, alongside Francis Kora, Matariki Whatarau and James Tito.

== Personal life ==
Pohatu has been given the nickname "Human Jukebox" because of his extensive musical knowledge.

== Discography ==
- Happy Hour (2014)
- That's Us! (2017)
