= Peter Hambleton =

New Zealand actor

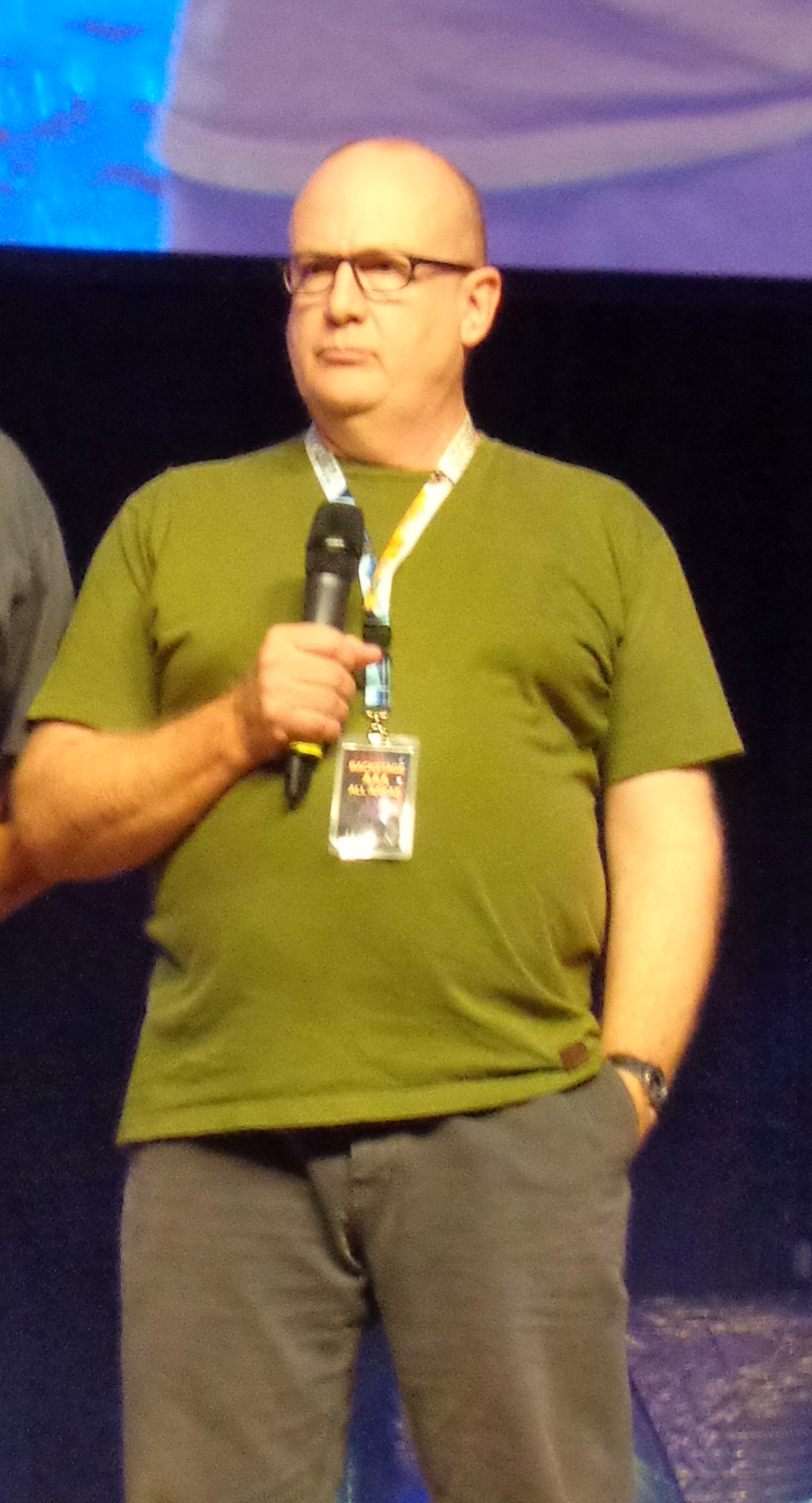
- Hambleton on 6 April 2015 at the Hobbitcon III convention in Bonn, Germany
- Born: 1960 (age 65–66); New Zealand
- Occupations: Actor, director

Peter Hambleton (born 1960) is a New Zealand stage, film and television actor, and stage director. Hambleton graduated from Toi Whakaari: New Zealand Drama School in 1982 with a Diploma in Acting. In 2002 Hambleton was a New Zealand Shakespeare’s Globe International Actors’ Fellow. Well known in the Wellington theatre scene, he has played ornithologist Walter Buller in the 2006 play Dr Buller's Birds and Charles Darwin in the 2009 play Collapsing Creation. He played the Dwarf Glóin in The Hobbit film series and Mike Johnson in an episode of the 1999 TV miniseries A Twist in the Tale. He has also featured in television advertisements, including as the businessman in the Ansett New Zealand "Fluffy" advertisement.

== Filmography ==
=== Films ===
Year	Film	Role	Notes
1993	The Rainbow Warrior	Maury Whitham	TV movie
1994	The Last Tattoo	Peter Davis	Feature film
2012	The Hobbit: An Unexpected Journey	Glóin, William, the stone troll	Feature film
2013	The Hobbit: The Desolation of Smaug	Glóin	Feature film
2014	The Hobbit: The Battle of the Five Armies	Glóin	Feature film

=== Television ===
Year	Film	Role	Notes
1995-96	Oscar and Friends	Oscar's Father	TV series
1999	A Twist in the Tale	Mike Johnson	TV miniseries
2013	Shortland Street	Alisdair Rolleston	TV series
2025	Warren's Vortex	Stanky Steve	TV series

=== Theatre ===
Year	Film	Role	Notes
2006	Birds	Walter Buller	
2009	Collapsing Creation	Charles Darwin	
