= Matariki Whatarau =

New Zealand actor and musician

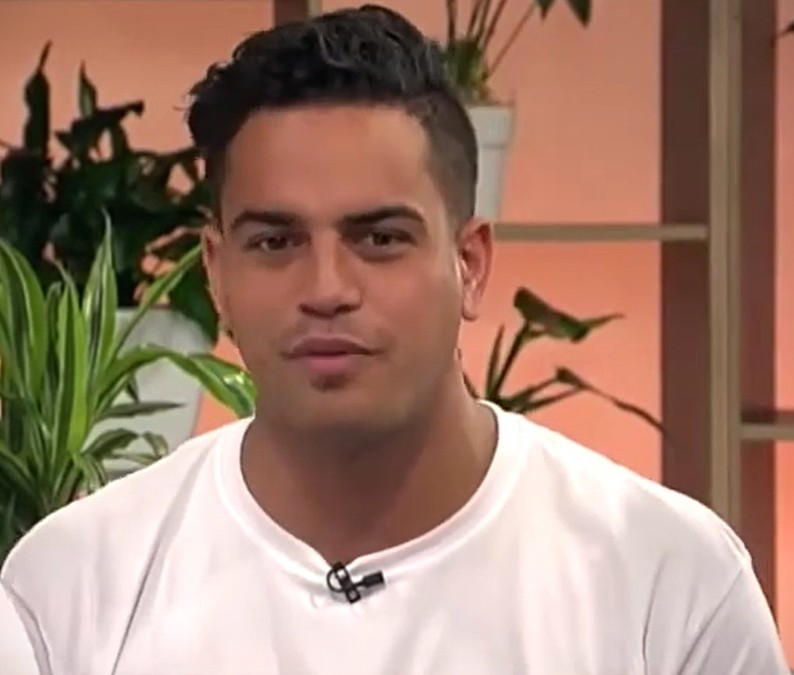
- Whatarau in 2017

Background information
- Born: Auckland, New Zealand
- Genres: Māori Showband, comedy, drama, theatre
- Occupations: actor, musician
- Instruments: guitar, vocals, cajón

Matariki Whatarau is a New Zealand actor and musician. Whatarau is also a founding member of Māori showband the Modern Māori Quartet. He co-wrote and performed songs, with the other band members, for the Modern Māori Quartet's debut album That's Us! (2017).

Whatarau appeared on the television programmes, Go Girls and Find me a Māori Bride. Whatarau also had a feature role in the film The Pā Boys (2014). Whatarau co-hosted Māori Television's My Party Song as part of the Modern Māori Quartet. In 2018, Matariki, along with other members of the Modern Māori Quartet, began touring their cabaret show Modern Māori Quartet: Two Worlds.

== Early life ==
Whatarau was born in Auckland (Tāmaki Makaurau), New Zealand and is of Māori (Ngāti Kahungunu, Ngāti Raukawa, Ngāti Whanaunga) descent. Matariki attended high school in Beijing, China and in Lilongwe, Malawi. Whatarau is a graduate of Toi Whakaari: New Zealand Drama School (Te Kura Toi Whakaari ō Aotearoa) earning a Bachelor of Performing Arts (Acting) in 2009.

== Career ==
=== Theatre ===
Whatarau performed in the theatre shows, Awhi Tapu and Party with the Aunties. In January 2020, Whatarau performed in, Modern Māori Quartet: Two Worlds, at the Off-Broadway theatre, SoHo Playhouse.

=== Film and television ===
Whatarau had a leading role as 'Tau', in the NZ film The Pā Boys, alongside fellow Modern Māori Quartet band member Francis Kora. Whatarau also had supporting roles in the films The Dead Lands (2014) and Mahana (2016). For 2 seasons, Matariki played, George Alpert, in the Māori Television mockumentary series, Find Me a Māori Bride (2015–2017). Matariki, and the other members of the Modern Māori Quartet, served as the in-house band on Māori Television’s variety show, Happy Hour (2014). He also acted in some of the shows comedy sketches.

=== Music ===
Whatarau is a member of Māori showband the Modern Māori Quartet, alongside Maaka Pohatu, Francis Kora and James Tito.

=== Personal life ===
Matariki is a fluent speaker of Mandarin.

== Discography ==
- Happy Hour (2014)
- That's Us! (2017)
