= John Leigh (New Zealand actor) =

New Zealand actor (born 1965)

- Born: 1965 (age 60–61); New Zealand
- Occupation: Actor/Voice actor
- Years active: 1989–present

John Leigh (born 1965) is a New Zealand actor. He has had roles in New Zealand TV shows such as Shortland Street, Mercy Peak and as Sparky in Outrageous Fortune. He is a voice actor, and worked for the Power Rangers franchise since 2003 (after the franchise had moved to New Zealand). He has appeared in films including the role of Háma in The Lord of the Rings: The Two Towers and as the bar-owner in Stickmen, and in the soap satire Serial Killers. In 2014 he acted in and wrote the short comedy film Snowmen.

He is also a stage actor and started on stage in Wellington before getting film and television roles. He is based in Auckland. Theatre shows he has appeared in with the Auckland Theatre Company include Kings of the Gym, Horseplay, Stones in His Pockets, Death of a Salesman and All My Sons.

== Filmography ==
=== Film ===
Year	Title	Role	Notes
1991	Still	Man	Short
1992	Chunuk Bair	Porky	
1993	Bradman	Lawrie	Short
1996	The Frighteners	Bryce Campbell	
1996	Chicken	Poisons doctor	
1997	Home Movie	Dave	
2001	Stickmen	Dave	
2002	The Lord of the Rings: The Two Towers	Háma	
2004	Spooked	Jimmy Blick	
2006	Ozzie	Gilbert	
2007	Tumanako Springs	Barkeep	Short
2007	We're Here to Help	Lesley Costello	
2010	The Insatiable Moon	Brian	
2011	Love Birds	Quiz Master	
2011	Rage	Bill Oram	
2012	Power Rangers Samurai: A New Enemy (vol. 2)	Fisherman	Video
2014	The Dark Horse	Gift Shop Owner	
2014	Snowmen	Barry	Short
2016	Mahana	Golden Shears Announcer	
2016	Goodness Grows Here		Short
2017	A Woman's Right to Shoes	Policeman	Short
2017	Goodness Grows Here	Barry	Short
2018	A War Story	Peter Arnett	
20??	Last Star	Sulunar	
2023	Uproar	Dennis	

=== Television ===
Year	Title	Role	Notes
1993–1999	Shortland Street	Lionel Skeggins	Regular role
1999–00	Xena: Warrior Princess	Nailscot / Hrothgar	Episodes: "The Ides of March", "Return of the Valkyrie"
2000	Jack of All Trades	Martin	Episode: "Sex and the Single Spy"
2001	Spin Doctors	Kevin Handy	TV series
2001–2003	Mercy Peak	Chook Bracey	Recurring role (seasons 1–3)
2002	Atomic Twister	Deputy Rollins	TV film
2003	Power Rangers Ninja Storm	Various (voice)	Guest role (5 episodes)
2004	Raising Waylon	Jeremy	TV film
2004	Power Rangers Dino Thunder	Insectolite (voice)	Episode: "Burning at Both Ends"
2004	Not Only But Always	Joe McGrath	TV film
2004	Serial Killers	Alan	TV series
2005	Kidnapped	Rankeillor	TV film
2005	Interrogation	Phil Worth	Episodes: "1.2", "True Confessions", "Tick Tock"
2005–2010	Outrageous Fortune	Barry 'Sparky' Gibbs	Recurring role (seasons 1–6)
2006	Maddigan's Quest	Harold	Episode: "Off the Map"
2006	Power Rangers Mystic Force	Octomus the Master (voice)	Guest role (4 episodes)
2007	Power Rangers Operation Overdrive	Brownbeard	Episode: "Pirate in Pink"
2007	The Man Who Lost His Head	George	TV film
2007	The Amazing Extraordinary Friends	Dave Ruben	Regular role
2009	Legend of the Seeker	Selick	Episode: "Sanctuary"
2009	Diplomatic Immunity	Mick Fa'auigaese	Main role
2010	Radiradirah	Friar Chuck	Episodes: "1.1", "1.2", "1.8"
2010	Avalon High	Mr. Atkinson	TV film
2011	Ice	Lammer	TV miniseries
2011	Underbelly NZ: Land of the Long Green Cloud	Mac the Mick	Episodes: "Disorganised Crime", "Trains 'N' Boats 'N' Planes", "All at Sea"
2011	Bliss	Herrr Gruber	TV film
2011	Power Rangers Samurai	Steeleto / Fisherman (voice)	Episodes: "Fish Out of Water", "Room for One More", "Party Monsters"
2011–12	The Almighty Johnsons	Bryn	Recurring role
2012	Highway Cops	Narrator	TV series
2013	Agent Anna	James Finlayson	Episode: "Swimming with Sharks"
2014	Power Rangers Megaforce	Damaras (voice)	Recurring role (season 2)
2015	Westside	Dougal Gibbs	Episode: "Dire Combustion"
2015	When We Go to War	Bertie Mueller	TV miniseries
2015–2018	800 Words	Const. Tom	Recurring role
2016	The Making of the Mob: Chicago	Jimmy Hoffa	Main role
2016	Auckward Love	Ted	Episodes; "You Must Be the Other Woman", "You're Going to Lose Him"
2017	Shortland Street	Lionel Skeggins	Recurring role
2017	The Cul De Sac	Ken	Episode: "2.3"
2017	The Shannara Chronicles	Dax	Episode: "Druid"
2019–2020	Power Rangers Beast Morphers	Sudsey / Keytron (voice)	Episodes: "Taking Care of Business", "Artist Anonymous", "Source Code"
2021	Power Rangers Dino Fury	Wreckmate (voice)	Recurring role
2025	Tangata Pai	Gary	TV series

== Power Rangers Series ==
- Power Rangers Ninja Storm (2003) - Terramole / Toxipod / Super Toxipod / Dr. Belrab (voice)
- Power Rangers Dino Thunder (2004) - Insectolite (voice)
- Power Rangers Mystic Force (2006) - Octomus The Master (voice)
- Power Rangers Operation Overdrive (2007) - Brownbeard
- Power Rangers Samurai (2011) - Fisherman / Steeleto (voice)
- Power Rangers Megaforce (2014) - Damaras (voice)
- Power Rangers Dino Fury (2021) - Wreckmate (voice)
