= Alice Canton =

New Zealand theatre-maker and actor

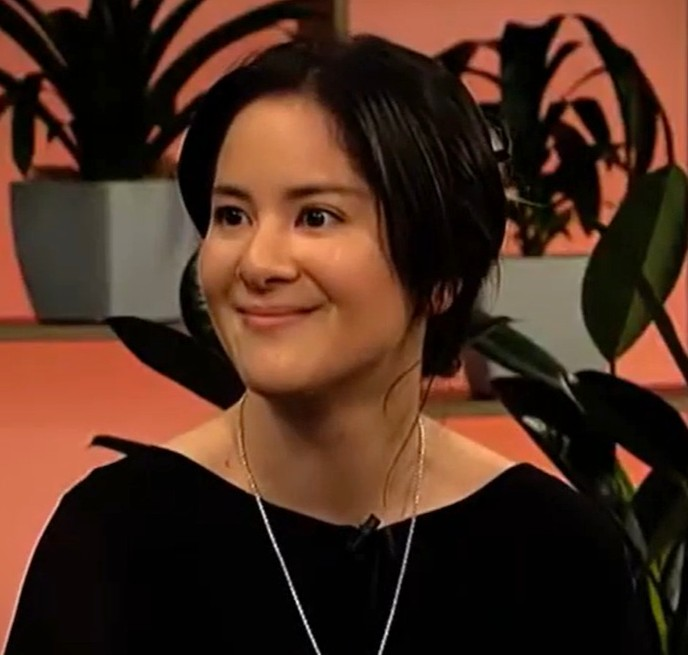
- Canton in 2017
- Born: 1986 or 1987 (age 38–39)
- Occupation(s): Theatre-maker and performer
- Notable work: Orangutan, White/Other and OTHER[chinese]

Alice Canton (born 1986 or 1987) is a New Zealand theatre-maker and performer of Chinese and Pākehā descent.

== Early life ==
Canton was born on the West Coast of the South Island of New Zealand in either 1986 or 1987. Her mother is a New Zealander of Chinese Malaysian descent, with family origins in Sarawak, Borneo. Sources differ whether her mother is a second generation, or third generation New Zealander. Her father is a fourth generation New Zealander of Welsh descent. Canton was raised in Christchurch.

She is a graduate of the University of Canterbury and Toi Whakaari: The New Zealand Drama School, where she graduated in 2012 with a Bachelor of Performing Arts (Acting).

== Career ==
Canton has worked as an actor, director and theatre-maker in New Zealand, and her career since 2011 has included work in arts, education and marketing. Canton creates work with the collective White_Mess, that draws upon theatre making and social practice. Her notable works include Orangutan, White/Other and OTHER [chinese].

=== Orangutan ===
In 2011, Canton travelled to Southeast Asia with support from the Asia New Zealand Foundation, to study performance traditions in mask and shadow puppetry. The trip included time in Indonesia learning the art of Balinese mask carving and dance. In 2015 after a five-week residency with the Christchurch dance organisation Movement Art Practice Canton created a solo performance Orangutan that she performed drawing on her experience in Indonesia. The show is set in the rainforest of Borneo and is performed with a mask and without spoken language. It tells the story of the struggle of the orangutan resulting from resource extraction and industrialisation. Canton says about the work:

I wanted to develop a non-verbal work that could be viewed widely and without the limitation of spoken language. Masks can be profound and universal, and I wanted to paint rich images that could speak to multiple layers.

Orangutan premiered at The Basement Theatre, Auckland from 30 June - 3 July 2015. In 2016, Canton staged Orangutan at Edgewater College and five other schools around the city, as part of Basement Theatre's schools programme.

=== White/Other ===
In 2016 Canton created White/Other, a solo performance piece about racial identity and racism. The show uses poetry, metaphor, observations, dance and projection and premiered in April 2016 at The Basement Theatre, Auckland.

=== OTHER [chinese] ===
OTHER [chinese] is a documentary theatre project involving live documentary, and deals with issues of identity and belonging. Audiences experience insights from those who identify as Chinese. The show premiered at the Q Theatre in Auckland in September 2017. The project was part of the 2021 Dunedin Arts Festival and Festival of Colour in Wānaka.

== Honours and awards ==
In 2015, at the Annual Auckland Theatre Awards, Canton won the Equity New Zealand Award for Best Show by an Emerging Artist for her work Orangutan.

In 2017, Canton won Best Show of 2017 (Metro Magazine) for her documentary-theatre project OTHER [chinese]. This production also featured at the Auckland Theatre Awards where she won the Excellence Award for Overall Production, and the Hackman Cup for Most Original Production, presented by the Prime Minister Jacinda Ardern.
