= Wellington Paranormal =

New Zealand mockumentary television series

- Genre: Comedy horror; Fantasy; Mockumentary
- Created by: Taika Waititi; Jemaine Clement; Paul Yates
- Written by: Jemaine Clement; Paul Yates; Melanie Bracewell; Jessica Hansell; Tom Sainsbury
- Directed by: Jemaine Clement; Jackie van Beek; Tim van Dammen
- Starring: Mike Minogue; Karen O'Leary; Maaka Pohatu; Tom Sainsbury
- Country of origin: New Zealand
- Original language: English
- No. of seasons: 4
- No. of episodes: 25

Production
- Executive producers: Taika Waititi; Jemaine Clement
- Producer: Paul Yates
- Production company: New Zealand Documentary Board

Original release
- Network: TVNZ 2
- Release: 11 July 2018 – 23 March 2022

Related
- What We Do in the Shadows; Warren's Vortex

Wellington Paranormal is a New Zealand mockumentary comedy horror television series which first aired on 11 July 2018 on TVNZ 2. The series is a spin-off of the 2014 film What We Do in the Shadows and first television series in the franchise, and its lead characters—Officers Minogue and O'Leary—first appeared in the film as a pair of incurious police officers.

== Production history ==
The series was created by Taika Waititi, Jemaine Clement and Paul Yates based on characters from What We Do in the Shadows by Clement and Waititi. Waititi and Clement serve as the series' executive producers, while Clement directs four of the six episodes in Series 1. The series was confirmed for a second series of 13 episodes, which aired 6 episodes beginning on 16 October 2019.

A Christmas special aired on 19 December 2019, with the remaining six episodes airing as a second series. Between the special and third series, a sixteen-episode digital web series and public service campaign by New Zealand Police to inform the public on health, safety, and best practices during the COVID-19 pandemic, titled Important COVID-19 Messages from Wellington Paranormal, began airing from 26 March 2020, featuring Andrew Coster and Clarke Gayford as themselves. The lead characters also appeared as part of a 2018 New Zealand Police Recruitment video, and four 2018 Police Safety campaign videos. The third series premiered on 24 February 2021.

Clement stated in June 2021 that the fourth series was in post-production. He added: "We're pausing on [Wellington Paranormal], we're not sure we'll be back for a fifth [series]", while discussing a new series that he and Waititi are currently developing. The fourth series premiered on 16 February 2022, following a sneak peek confirming that it would be the final series.

On 5 August 2026, it was announced that Kitchen Table Productions will produce a six-episode fifth season to air on Three.

== Cast ==
=== Main ===
- Mike Minogue as Officer Kyle Minogue
- Karen O'Leary as Officer O'Leary
- Maaka Pohatu as Sergeant Ruawai Maaka
- Tom Sainsbury as Constable Parker (series 4, recurring series 1–3)

=== Recurring ===
- Lynda Topp as Mrs. O'Leary

=== Guest ===
- Cori Gonzalez-Macuer as Nick
- Jemaine Clement as Mobot Voice
- Rhys Darby as Anton
- Josh Thomson as Satan

== Episodes ==
Series	Episodes	Originally released	
Series	Episodes	First released	Last released
1	6	11 July 2018	15 August 2018
2	6	16 October 2019	20 November 2019
Special		19 December 2019	
3	6	24 February 2021	31 March 2021
4	6	16 February 2022	23 March 2022

=== Series 1 (2018) ===
No. overall	No. in series	Title	Directed by	Written by	Original release date
1	1	"Demon Girl"	Jemaine Clement	Jemaine Clement & Paul Yates	11 July 2018
Wellington police officers Minogue and O'Leary encounter a young girl projectile vomiting in Cuba Mall, and claiming to be Bazu'aal of the Unholy Realm. The girl is taken back to the station, where she proceeds to climb the walls like a spider and escape. Sergeant Maaka recruits Minogue and O'Leary into his new Paranormal Unit and tasks them with investigating strange phenomena in and around Wellington. Pursuing Bazu'aal as he body hops between the girl's family members, Minogue and O'Leary conduct an exorcism to stop the demon from opening a hellmouth in the Bucket Fountain.
2	2	"Cop Circles"	Jemaine Clement	Melanie Bracewell	18 July 2018
Sergeant Maaka sends Minogue and O'Leary out to the country to investigate an incident where a cow has ended up at the top of a tall tree, and he suspects aliens are responsible. The officers speak to the farmer and his strangely similar family members, and find crop circles and seed pods in the fields. As night falls, the police are pursued by plant-based extra-terrestrial life forms, but manage to lock them in a shed. As they outline the night's events to the documentary crew, their alien clones escape the shed and wander away.
3	3	"Things That Do the Bump in the Night (Note: When aired on The CW, the title of the episode is "70's Ghost")"	Jackie van Beek	Nick Ward	25 July 2018
Minogue and O'Leary attend a noise complaint in Khandallah, where they find what appears to be a 1970s theme party in full swing. When O'Leary unplugs the record player, the party goers vanish. Sergeant Maaka suspects that ghosts are responsible, and calls for a medium, Chloe Patterson, to attempt to communicate with them. The officers encounter a series of spectres in the house, who they discover are the ghosts of people who died at a party held by Raymond St John, known as the "Party King", in the 1970s. They convince St John, who has possessed Patterson, to release her and allow his guests to go on to the afterlife. St John however manages to escape custody due to his spectral form.
4	4	"The She Wolf of Kurimarama Street (Note: When aired on The CW, the title of the episode is "She-Wolf")"	Jackie van Beek	Jessica Hansell	1 August 2018
When a pizza delivery boy claims he was attacked by a "dog wearing jeans", Minogue and O'Leary follow a trail of destruction and missing pets to a disoriented young woman named Sheena. As they drive her home, the full moon is revealed, and Sheena transforms into a werewolf. When Sheena returns to human form, she realises her ex-boyfriend, Dion (one of the werewolf pack from What We Do in the Shadows) has transmitted his condition to her.
5	5	"A Normal Night (Note: When aired on The CW, the title of the episode is "Vampire")"	Jemaine Clement	Sam Smith	8 August 2018
Minogue and O'Leary confront a series of mysterious events—a wilful floating plastic bag, apparent thefts of blood bags from Wellington Hospital, strange sacrificial rites in a Wellington park, and a posse of evil clowns in a very small car. Apart from the evil clown posse, the common underlying element to the events is Nick (the fledgeling vampire from What We Do in the Shadows), who is selling bootleg stolen blood from his job as a Wellington Hospital orderly to other local vampires. Ultimately, Nick glamours them into forgetting it all ever happened.
6	6	"Zombie Cops"	Jemaine Clement	Jemaine Clement & Paul Yates	15 August 2018
Two fellow Wellington Police officers, Donovan and Laupepe, get bitten by a zombie in a police interview room and turn while out on patrol, leading to a string of mishaps until the Paranormal Unit recognises the situation and takes steps to retrieve the errant officers, who have meanwhile bitten a fast food attendant and driver. Fortunately, the zombies are found to be susceptible to radio wave control and are soon back safely in the custody of their colleagues. Donovan and Laupepe are reassigned to desk duty.

=== Series 2 (2019) ===
No. overall	No. in series	Title	Directed by	Written by	Original release date
7	1	"Taniwha (Note: When aired on The CW, the title of the episode is "The Not Ness Monster")"	Dean Hewison	Nick Ward	16 October 2019
Sergeant Maaka, and constables Minogue, O'Leary and Parker head to Wellington Harbour, where ten anglers have disappeared, including the prime minister's fiancé Clarke Gayford. Taking to the water with Captain Quinn of the police maritime unit, the officers encounter a taniwha, a sea monster of Māori legend who has emerged in response to overfishing. The taniwha seemingly captures Parker and devours the documentary crew. Maaka, Minogue and O'Leary manage to rescue most of the other anglers but one is devoured. While watching two taniwha mating in the Wellington Harbour, the two encounter Parker, who had been staying the night with his mother.
8	2	"Fear the Briannas"	Jackie van Beek	Amanda Alison	23 October 2019
Minogue and O'Leary investigate a floating chippie packet, leading them to a local girls' high school called St Carrietta's Girl School where an implosion has happened in the library, destroying the witchcraft section. The principal is uncooperative but the officers learn about unexplained supernatural activities after questioning the students. The officers discover that three teen witches known as the Briannas are behind the supernatural activities. Following a struggle, Minogue manages to subdue them with a taser. The girls are issued with a warning by Sergeant Maaka. However, the school is revealed to be inhabited by students with magical powers.
9	3	"Mt Victoria Hooters"	Tim van Dammen	Melanie Bracewell	30 October 2019
While enforcing a ban on unnecessary horn tooting in the Mount Victoria Tunnel, Minogue and O'Leary accidentally unleash a ghost policeman named Constable Miller from the 1930s. Miller goes around enforcing antiquated laws including floggings, jailing people for indecency, and closing bars. Sergeant Maaka tasks Minogue and O'Leary with getting rid of Miller. Following a prolonged chase through the Wellington CBD including the Wellington Cable Car, the officers manage to reach a compromise with Miller by reversing the ban on horn tooting.
10	4	"Copy Cops"	Tim van Dammen	Cori Gonzalez-Macuer	6 November 2019
The discovery of a dead policeman that looks exactly like Minogue leads the cops to the Parkland Motel in the country full of exact copies of themselves. O'Leary and Minogue quickly discover that the "clones" are actually the alien fungi they had encountered in an earlier incident. The alien fungi also managed to capture Sergeant Maaka. The cops discover that slugs are harmful to the alien fungi and force the aliens to retreat back to their flying saucer.
11	5	"Haunted Nissan (Note: When aired on The CW, the title of the episode is "The Haunting of the '85 Nissan 300ZX ZR Turbo")"	Jackie van Beek	Paul Yates	13 November 2019
While visiting a zombie themed party, Minogue and O'Leary's patrol car is stolen. Sergeant Maaka considers downsizing the paranormal unit after purchasing a new drone. Minogue and O'Leary respond to the theft of a 1980s Nissan 300ZX. After finding a boy inside, Minogue discovers it's haunted by the original owner, the late boy racer Shane who died by suicide after his girlfriend Sharon wanted to leave the relationship. Following a confrontation with Sharon and the officers, Shane makes peace with his former girlfriend and leaves for the next life. A pleased Maaka decides to keep both Minogue and O'Leary but on reduced working hours.
12	6	"Mobots"	Jemaine Clement	Jemaine Clement	20 November 2019
During a briefing, Sergeant Maaka warns his team of constables not to use pepper spray on food. Later, Maaka briefs O'Leary and Minogue about a recent spate of stolen electronic devices including out of date mobile phones. The two officers visit O'Leary's mother's home to stake out her place, which is near a communications tower. At night, the missing phones gather into the form of a snake before transforming into a robot. The robot is led by O'Leary's 2004 mobile phone and seeks revenge against its former human owners by wanting to turn the newer mobile phones against them. Sergeant Maaka enlists the services of a hacker named Ben, who installs new updates which cause the robot to overload and disintegrate.

=== Christmas special (2019) ===
No. overall	Title	Directed by	Written by	Original release date
13	"Christmas Special"	Dean Hewison	Paul Yates	19 December 2019
Minogue and O'Leary respond to several supernatural incidents on Christmas Eve including Satan assuming the role of a mall Santa, meat disappearing into a vortex during a barbecue, a demon-possessed doll terrorizing a family, and a photocopying machine serving as a vortex. Following these adventures, Minogue and O'Leary present Sergeant Maaka with a soft toy as a Christmas present, which turns out to be possessed.

=== Series 3 (2021) ===
No. overall	No. in series	Title	Directed by	Written by	Original release date
14	1	"The Invisible Fiend"	Tim van Dammen	Nick Ward	24 February 2021
After getting called out to a mysterious home invasion with no visible signs of entry, Minogue and O'Leary manage to arrest an invisible entity and bring it in for questioning. The entity turns out to be a large multi-tentacled creature. Despite the efforts of Minogue, O'Leary, Sergeant Maaka and Constable Parker, the creature manages to escape police custody. Minogue and O'Leary finally track the creature back to the home they initially visited. From the little girl they meet, they discover that the creature is named Daisy and is more afraid of them than vice versa. After installing a tracking device, they join the girl and other monsters for tea.
15	2	"Te Maero"	Jemaine Clement	Jemaine Clement	3 March 2021
Tonight, after finding footage of a camper being abducted by a large hairy creature, the cops decide to head for the bush near the Remutaka Range. There, they discover that the creature is a Maero, a giant from Māori lore, who is looking for a mate. The Maero mistakes Parker for a male member of its species and potential mate. When they find out the fate of the camper, they try to arrest the Maero but lose her in the woods.
16	3	"Fear Factory"	Jemaine Clement	Paul Yates	10 March 2021
While on a night patrol, Minogue and O'Leary encounter several people who have been accosted by various objects they fear including a shark. During their investigation, they discover that these individuals had visited a shop known as the Fear Factory, whose owner is a shapeshifter that feeds on peoples' fears and phobias. The officers bring him in for questioning but he manages to escape by projecting the various officers' fears. With the help of Parker, Minogue and O'Leary corner the shapeshifter in the Fear Factory, by overloading his shapeshifting powers.
17	4	"The Sevens Ghosts"	Tim Van Dammen	Cori Gonzalez-Macuer	17 March 2021
Minogue and O'Leary investigate a group of ghostly rugby fans dressed as Where's Wally figures, whose activities including kidnapping pedestrians and vomiting. The constables managed to apprehend two of the ghostly figures but they escape. While confronting them in a van, Minogue is kidnapped by the ghosts, whom they discover are rugby fans who died in a car accident in 2001. Together with Parker, O'Leary visits an old friend of the ghostly rugby fans, who is able to convince them that they are deceased. After returning with Minogue, the ghosts depart.
18	5	"The Revengers"	Tim Van Dammen	Amanda Alison	24 March 2021
While attending to a traffic incident in the suburbs, Minogue and O'Leary respond to a meteorite strike, which has caused some of the local residents to gain superpowers. These residents, a Polynesian gentleman who can shoot electricity, a cat lady, and a young lady, form a neighbourhood watch called the "Revengers" who exact vigilante justice against bank robbers, graffiti taggers, and a man who fails to pick up his dog's excrement. Minogue and O'Leary confront the Revengers with the help of a water-squirting man and the ineffectual Parker, who has acquired magnetic powers. A showdown between the electric-wielding Polynesian man and the water-squirting man creates an explosive reaction that causes the mutants to lose their superpowers.
19	6	"Fatberg"	Jemaine Clement	Melanie Bracewell	31 March 2021
Constables Minogue and O'Leary investigate reports that a sentient fatberg has been devouring people and pets. After escaping the fatberg during a carwash, the two rescue a man from being sucked down the sewers by the entity. Continuing their hunt, the two encounter the entity beneath the sewers of Wellington. O'Leary escapes absorption but one of the cameramen is devoured. Meanwhile, Sergeant Maaka and Constable Parker discover that fire is deadly to the fatberg. The fatberg attacks a Wellington fish and chip shop, devouring the patrons. The police officers manage to blow up the fatberg, in the process freeing the people that the entity had absorbed.

=== Series 4 (2022) ===
No. overall	No. in series	Title	Directed by	Written by	Original release date
20	1	"Bird Woman"	Tim van Dammen	Melanie Bracewell	16 February 2022
Minogue and O'Leary investigate sightings of a Kurangaituku, a bird woman from Māori lore, who has been stealing objects and attacking people. The Wellington Paranormal squad enlists the help of the ornithologist Beverly, who is kidnapped by the bird woman. Meanwhile, Constable Parker releases his uncle's pet budgerigar in an attempt to figure out the behaviour of the bird woman. However, the budgie is killed when it flies into a fan. The squad confront the Kurangaituku at the Brooklyn Wind Turbine, who attempts to feed the ornithologist to her chicks. O'Leary manages to defuse the situation by convincing the bird woman to settle in the Zealandia ecosanctuary. However, the bird woman eats Beverly and feeds her to her chicks.
21	2	"The Wicked Man"	Jackie Van Beek	Rosie Howells	23 February 2022
Minogue and O'Leary investigate the disappearance of a teenage girl named Sophie Wilkes, a member of the Hornvale religious community. Inhabiting Sales Island, the cult worships the Horned God and are led by the matriarch Avalon; Minogue and O'Leary are only permitted entry to the community as they are (by the standards of the cult) virgins. While watching an induction video, Minogue is hypnotised. While conducting their investigation, the police officers learn that the cult intends to sacrifice virgin police officers to imbue their members with eternal life. Minogue is captured but O'Leary manages to escape and disguises herself as a cult member. They learn that Sophie is not missing and that Avalon had staged her disappearance to lure them here. Before the cult can sacrifice Minogue to the Horned God, Minogue reveals that he in fact a Virgo, not a virgin, and the cult are stopped by Sergeant Maaka and reinforcements.
22	3	"The Coolening"	Jemaine Clement	Raybon Kan	2 March 2022
While giving a recruitment talk at a high school, Minogue and O'Leary confiscate a blue leather jacket from an errant student. The two are drawn to the jacket, which makes its wearer cool but confrontational and rebellious. Minogue and O'Leary fight over the jacket at the police station. Sergeant Maaka and Parker discover that the jacket belonged to "Notorious Roland", a dancer who lived during the 1980s. The blue jacket takes Minogue and O'Leary to a second hand shop where they encounter a pair of gold satin trousers belonging to Roland's rival Edmond "The Eggbeater" Egmont. Maaka convinces the two ghosts to end their feud and release Minogue and O'Leary.
23	4	"Skeleton Crew"	Jackie van Beek	Paul Yates	9 March 2022
While installing a new Broadband network at the Wellington Police station, the workers disturb a cemetery containing the remains of several Pākehā/European New Zealanders. The ghosts wreak havoc with the station's computer systems and machinery, trapping Maaka, Minogue, O'Leary, and Parker inside the police station. Maaka is possessed by the ghost of John "Whitey" Whiteman, a homicidal golfer who murdered his golfing companions after failing to get a bogey in the 18th hole. Following a game of golf, the police officers manage to convince Whiteman to release Maaka. Maaka manages to convince the ghosts to return to their graves by presenting a property deed stating that ghosts do not own the station.
24	5	"Who the Hell (Note: When aired on The CW, the title of the episode is "Who the Hell?")"	Tim van Dammen	Paul Yates, Nick Ward, and Melanie Bracewell	16 March 2022
During a routine night patrol, Minogue and O'Leary investigate a series of mysterious curses which manifest in unruly behaviour including a headless delivery van driver, a heavy metal guitarist physically compelled by play, and a man forced to hold onto a rock lest he float away. They discover that Satan has allowed people sell their souls in return for short-term favours (such as the delivery driver's wish to lose five pounds' of weight). O'Leary forces Satan to remove the curses after winning a game of an off-brand version of Guess Who?. Meanwhile, Sergeant Maaka has to deal with a poltergeist that messes with the police maps. Elsewhere, Parker is assigned a new colleague in the form of Constable Sainsbury, who is a member of the Armed Offenders Squad. Concerned for Sainsbury's safety, as all of his previous partners died in the line of duty, they take part in a night-time operation where Sainsbury has a narrow brush with death.
25	6	"Time Cop (Note: When aired on The CW, the title of the episode is "Time Cop: Not The Jean-Claude Van Damme One")"	Tim van Dammen	Paul Yates, Nick Ward, and Melanie Bracewell	23 March 2022
While on a routine patrol, Minogue and O'Leary encounter a time worm, which drains energy from people to create wormholes which facilitate time travel. Minogue and O'Leary travel back in time to 1994 where they encounter a nine-year old Maaka, who has aspirations of becoming a police officer. After returning to the future, they discover that the absence of Maaka as their police commander (and replaced by Parker) has created a dystopian future dominated by zombies and other monsters. Realizing that Maaka was put off from joining the Police after their untimely encounter, instead becoming the "inventor" of the fidget spinner Minogue gave him, Minogue and O'Leary return to 1994 to prevent themselves from meeting Maaka. After defeating the time worm, they return to 2022 where they encourage Maaka, who has doubts about his police career.

== Specials ==
=== Police Recruitment video ===
No. in series	Title	Directed by	Written by	Original release date	URL
–	"Breaking News"	Unknown	Unknown	23 October 2018	
After a senior officer announces that the police are looking for new recruits, members of the public ask various cops what requirements are needed and opportunities are available. In one instance, two officers are watching a sheep being levitated and speculate that it might be UFO related. A bystander then asks them if the NZ Police have a paranormal division. The officers turn to answer, revealing that they are O'Leary and Minogue; O'Leary denies the existence of such a division while simultaneously Minogue confirms there is one, then quickly corrects his answer to match O'Leary's.

=== Police Summer Safety ===
No. in series	Title	Directed by	Written by	Original release date	URL
1	"Zombie"	Dean Hewison	Paul Yates	4 December 2018	
O'Leary and Minogue discuss the dangers of not wearing a seatbelt, and try to convince a zombie driver to wear his.
2	"UFO"	Dean Hewison	Paul Yates	12 December 2018	
O'Leary and Minogue discuss the dangers of being distracted while driving, and are then themselves distracted by a UFO.
3	"Speed Demon"	Dean Hewison	Paul Yates	19 December 2018	
O'Leary and Minogue discuss the dangers of speeding and clash with a demonic speedster.
4	"Ghost"	Dean Hewison	Paul Yates	27 December 2018	
O'Leary and Minogue discuss the dangers of drunk driving with the ghost of a man killed because he drove while intoxicated.

=== Important COVID-19 messages (2020) ===
No. in series	Title	Directed by	Written by	Original release date
1	"Distance and isolation"	Unknown	Unknown	26 March 2020
New Zealand Police and Wellington Paranormal team up to provide some important COVID-19 messages, and a little bit of humour to brighten your day 👻#stayhomenz
2	"Having Fun at Home"	Unknown	Unknown	29 March 2020
All the things you never knew you could do to have fun at home. A little bit of humour to brighten your day.
3	"Looking After the Older Folks"	Unknown	Unknown	29 March 2020
Now's the time to get over using the phone for actually 'talking' to people issues and be bold. Call your grandparents, elderly neighbours, anyone that might find speaking to someone really quite nice at this time. Go on, do it.. 📞
4	"7 Day Twitch"	Unknown	Unknown	3 April 2020
The 7-day twitch could possibly be feeling worse than a 7-year itch right now. But don't do it, don't leave. Stay in and work on your relationships. Most importantly, try not to go mad like Minogue.
5	"Two Metres Please"	Unknown	Unknown	3 April 2020
Here's the two-metre song from Officer O'Leary. Hear it once and you'll never forget it. This and other tips for keeping the 2-metre rule from Officers O'Leary and a cameo appearance from Officer Phil.
6	"Who needs Batman?"	Unknown	Unknown	4 April 2020
Who needs Batman? New Commissioner Andrew Coster meets Officer O'Leary and says he has a direct line to 10,000 Supermen and Superwomen. Out there, doing their jobs, every day. Keeping you safe.
7	"TEN-FIVE"	Unknown	Unknown	5 April 2020
Paranormal monster in the house? Run out of pasta? O'Leary takes Minogue through when to call or go online to contact the Police. The actual Police.
8	"Misconceptions"	Unknown	Unknown	9 April 2020
Officer O'Leary's mother (Lynda Topp) is full of the goss sugar plum. She's just about heard every misconception going about the Coruba virus.
9	"Teenchat"	Unknown	Unknown	10 April 2020
Officer O'Leary has a message for teens at this time. Yes, it totally sucks to be you. Minogue translates to teen-speak. Eye roll. LOL.
10	"Paranormal Briefing"	Unknown	Unknown	12 April 2020
Sergeant Maaka holds a Paranormal unit briefing in lockdown. Officer Parker and Minogue join O'Leary to report in on Supernatural crime in Home Isolation.
11	"Clarke & Neve"	Unknown	Unknown	15 April 2020
Officer O'Leary checks in with Clarke Gayford (Prime Minister Jacinda Ardern's bloke) about life at home with toddler Neve under lockdown. It's just not easy being at home with kids, especially if you've got a Minogue around!
12	"Supermarket Etiquette"	Unknown	Unknown	18 April 2020
"I don't want to talk about your nuts Minogue". 🥜 If you're headed to the SUPERMARKET this weekend, Officer O'Leary has some supermarket etiquette tips to help you keep everyone else safe and happy.
13	"Cycle safety"	Unknown	Unknown	19 April 2020
Is that lycra legal? If you're going out cycling check your bike is in good nick first, wear a bike helmet and cycle locally. If you're like Minogue and taking 'local' super seriously then thumbs up to you. But please – could you put away any exposed nipples, it's just not a good look! 🚲
14	"Ghost Cop"	Unknown	Unknown	24 April 2020
Whooo hooo. If you're thinking of sneaking out, just be warned there's an Officer O'Leary ghosty about. Ok people, it would be really just great if you could just stay home and not be tempted to go out and catch up with friends or go somewhere you shouldn't (or risk being terrified by ghosts). Whooo hoop 👻
15	"Level 3"	Unknown	Unknown	29 April 2020
Have you felt a bit invisible at Level 4 Lockdown? Officer O'Leary understands the feeling! Now we've moved to Level 3 here's all the things you can now do just in case you've missed them.
16	"The Wrap Up"	Unknown	Unknown	8 May 2020
It's a bit emotional really! New Zealand Police and Wellington Paranormal – Citizens Brigade would like to thank you for watching and being so supportive of our mini-series which covered Covid19 related information and messages. We saw all your likes and shares and read all your comments too. We know it's been an incredibly difficult time for New Zealanders over the last six weeks and that there are tough times to come, but we hope that these videos have brought a smile to your face, and provided you with useful information too. Thank you also to Wrestler who produced the series. We couldn't have done it without you especially at such short notice. Kia kaha New Zealand. Thanks for watching!
17	"Go Get a Test"	Unknown	Unknown	23 August 2020
Officer O'Leary is back with a super infectious song 'Go get a test'! Just like Covid-19, Wellington Paranormal – Citizens Brigade has returned! If you download the app, get a test if you need it and wear a mask when you need to it will hopefully just be for a short time.
18	"Been Here Before"	Unknown	Unknown	3 September 2020
Sgt Maaka addresses the nation while Auckland is still at Alert Level 3 and the rest of the country is at Alert Level 2. Mrs Maaka gives him a dressing-down about being a Flashy Pants.
19	"Download the App"	Unknown	Unknown	3 September 2020
If Officers O'Leary and Minogue from Wellington Paranormal – Citizens Brigade can use the NZ Covid tracer app, you can too! Make sure you are downloading the right app to make it extra useful! When wearing masks apply common sense, unlike Minogue.

== Broadcast and distribution ==
The series is broadcast on TVNZ 2 with catch-up availability on TVNZ's streaming service TVNZ+. In neighboring Australia, the series is available on SBS on Demand.

In 2021, Sky licensed the first three series of the show for streaming on Now (formerly Now TV) and Sky Q via Sky Comedy in the United Kingdom. In the United States, the series debuted on The CW on 11 July 2021, with episodes available to stream on HBO Max the day after they air.

As of 10 March 2023 the series are also being broadcast on the Flemish TV channel Canvas.

== Reception ==
On Rotten Tomatoes, the first series has a score of 97%, based on 31 reviews, with an average rating of 7.6/10. The site's critical consensus reads: "A deft blend of monster-of-the-week frights and low-key humor, Wellington Paranormal is a droll delight." On Metacritic, the first series has a score of 72 out of 100, based on reviews from 12 critics, indicating "generally favorable reviews".

Clarke Gayford's appearance on a short Wellington Paranormal video in April 2020 encouraging people who were looking after young children during the COVID-19 pandemic drew some criticism due to his relationship with Prime Minister Jacinda Ardern. National Party Member of Parliament Brett Hudson alleged during an Epidemic Response Committee meeting in early May 2020 that the video risked "politicising" the New Zealand Police. In response, Police Commissioner Andrew Coster defended Gayford's participation on the grounds that he was a well-known television personality who had participated in the television series.
