= Mike Minogue (actor) =

New Zealand actor

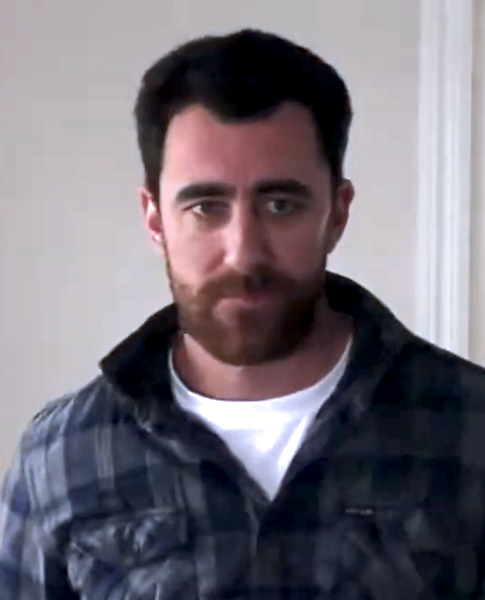
- Born: Michael Vincent Minogue; 1978 (age 47–48)
- Citizenship: New Zealand
- Occupations: Actor, radio personality
- Years active: 2000s–present
- Television: Wellington Paranormal

Michael Vincent Minogue (born 1978) is a New Zealand television and film actor. He is best known for portraying Officer Minogue, a character he first played in What We Do in the Shadows (2014), which he reprised in the television series Wellington Paranormal from 2018 to 2022. He won Best Actor in the 2019 New Zealand Television Awards for the role.

Minogue began his career on the production side of film in the New Zealand film industry, working in various production roles on movies such as The Lord of the Rings: The Return of the King (2003) and Avatar (2009), among others. He got his first acting role in Separation City (2009). After landing his role as Officer Minogue on What We Do in the Shadows (2014), he went on to star in the successful television spinoff, Wellington Paranormal, which lasted four seasons. In 2016, Minogue launched his own web series, The Water Cooler. In 2021, Minogue co-produced the thriller Coming Home in the Dark.

From 2021 until 2026, Minogue has also worked at Radio Hauraki, and was the co-host of Radio Hauraki's Big Show, alongside Jason Hoyte and Chris Key.

== Biography ==
Minogue grew up in Levin, New Zealand, and was educated at St Joseph's Primary School, Horowhenua College and spent a year at St. Patrick's College, Silverstream.

Minogue began acting when he was 31 years old, after working various roles in the film industry.

== Career ==
=== Early career ===
Minogue started in the production side of the film industry on a number of films, including The Lord of the Rings: The Return of the King (2003), The Hobbit trilogy, Avatar (2009), District 9 (2009), and The Adventures of Tintin (2011). He held various production roles, including as a runner, and working on miniatures for King Kong (2005). Minogue got into acting by chance after being encouraged by a colleague to audition for a role in Separation City (2009).

=== What We Do in the Shadows and Wellington Paranormal (2014–2022) ===
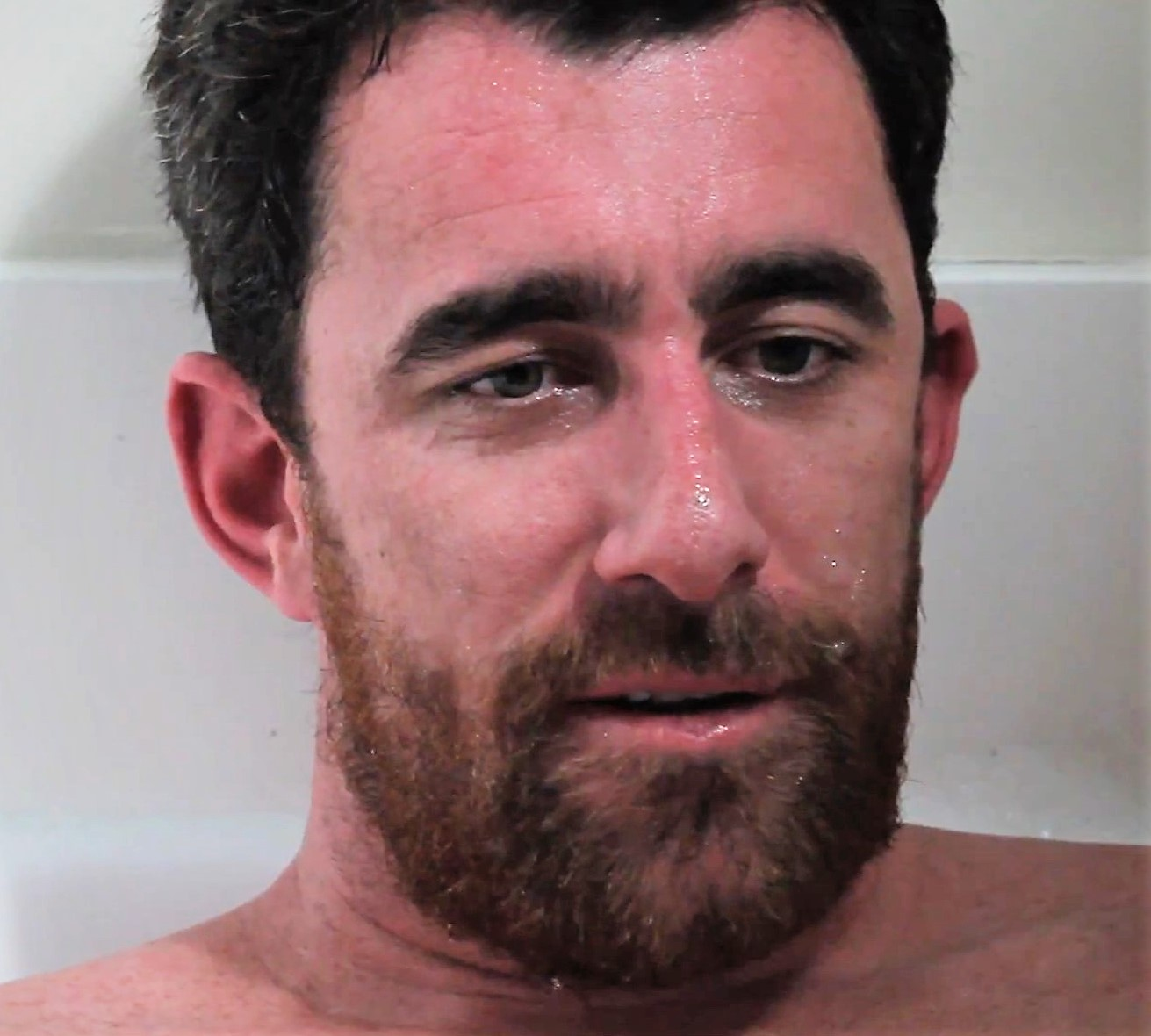
Minogue in The Catch, a 2012 short film

Minogue auditioned for a part in the 2014 film What We Do in the Shadows. He was given the role of Officer Minogue in the film and continued the same role in the spin-off television series Wellington Paranormal. The show ran for four seasons until its final episode in 2022. Minogue won a New Zealand Television Award for this role in 2019.

Minogue developed and starred in web/TV series The Water Cooler in 2016. He has also produced a number of short films, and appeared in Hunt For The Wilderpeople as a hunter.

=== Radio Hauraki (2021–present) ===
In 2021, Minogue and Jason Hoyte began co-hosting the Radio Hauraki Drive Show. The show introduced Chris Key and developed into Radio Hauraki's Big Show. That same year, Minogue co-produced the thriller Coming Home in the Dark.

== Filmography ==
=== Television ===
Year	Title	Role	Notes
2011	Rage	Inspector Ted James	TV movie
2015	How to Murder Your Wife	Nervous Burgess	TV movie
2016	Doubt: The Scott Watson Case	Detective T	TV movie
2016–2018	The Water Cooler	Michael	6 episodes; writer/producer
2018–2022	Wellington Paranormal	Officer Minogue	Main role; writer
2022	My Life Is Murder	Reg	Episode: "It Takes Two"
2024	Madam	Eddie	Episode 1.3
2024	Time Bandits	Headface	7 episodes

=== Film ===
Year	Title	Role	Notes
2009	Separation City	Errol the Fireman	
2012	The Catch	John	Short
2012	Jackals	Jimmy	Short
2013	The God Painter	Richard	Short
2014	What We Do in the Shadows	Policeman	
2014	Can You Hear Me Now?	Mike	Short
2016	Hunt for the Wilderpeople	Joe	
2014	Cleaver	The Husband	Short
2021	Coming Home in the Dark	—	Producer
