= Francis Kora =

New Zealand musician and actor

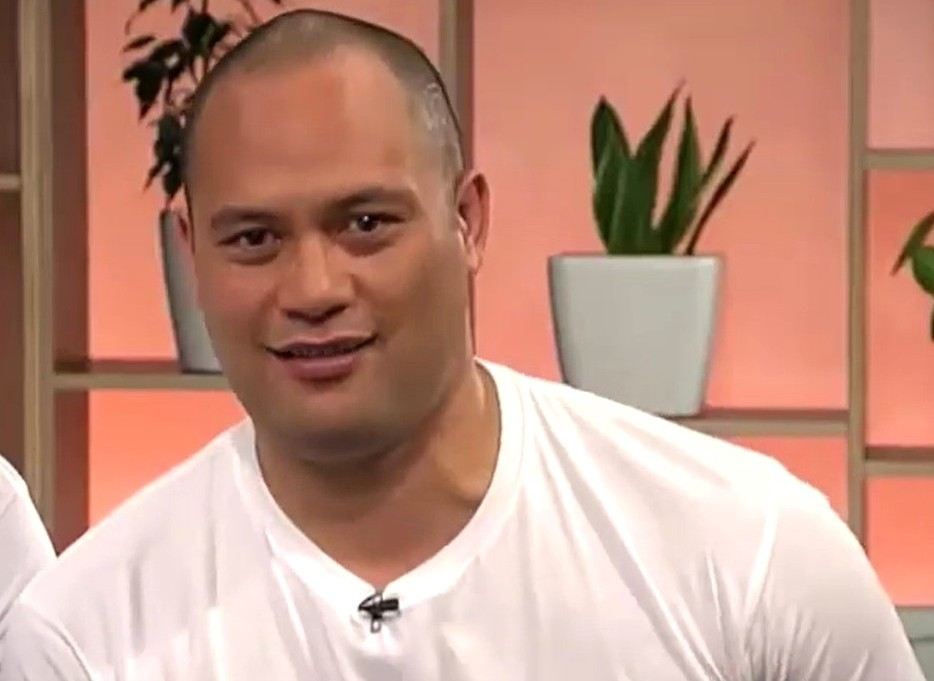
- Kora in 2017

Background information
- Born: Whakatāne, New Zealand
- Genres: Showband, Reggae/dub
- Occupations: musician, actor
- Instruments: bass guitar, vocalist
- Years active: 1991–present

Francis Kora is a New Zealand musician and actor. He currently performs with the groups Kora and the Modern Māori Quartet. He co-wrote and performed songs, with the other band members, for the Modern Māori Quartet's debut album That's Us! (2017).

Kora starred in the 2014 film The Pā Boys. He co-hosts Māori Television's My Party Song as part of the Modern Māori Quartet. In 2018 Kora, alongside other members of Modern Māori Quartet, began touring their cabaret show Modern Māori Quartet: Two Worlds.

== Early life ==
Kora was born in Whakatāne, New Zealand and is of Māori (Ngāi Tūhoe, Ngāti Pūkeko) descent. Francis and his three brothers Laughton, Stuart and Brad grew up entertaining. As kids they played RSAs, rugby clubs and Cossie clubs in Whakatāne, under the guidance of their Father. Francis is a graduate of Toi Whakaari: New Zealand Drama School (Te Kura Toi Whakaari ō Aotearoa) earning a Bachelor of Performing Arts (Acting) in 2003.

== Career ==
=== Music ===
In the 1990s Kora and his three brothers, Laughton, Brad and Stuart, founded the band, Kora. He is a member of the Māori showband the Modern Māori Quartet, alongside Maaka Pohatu, Matariki Whatarau and James Tito.

=== Film and television ===
Kora made his debut feature film appearance as a lead actor in The Pā Boys in 2014.

=== Theatre ===
In 2018 Francis, along with other members of Modern Māori Quartet, began touring their cabaret show Modern Māori Quartet: Two Worlds.

=== Personal life ===
Kora has a young daughter, Coco-Grace and a young son Akira Tait Kora. He wrote the Modern Māori Quartet's song "Shine" for her, and dedicated it to "all the kids in the world".

== Discography ==
- Happy Hour (2014)
- That's Us! (2017)
