= Two Little Boys (film) =

2012 film

- Directed by: Robert Sarkies
- Written by: Robert Sarkies; Duncan Sarkies
- Produced by: Vicky Pope; Timothy White
- Starring: Bret McKenzie; Hamish Blake; Maaka Pohatu; Filip Berg
- Cinematography: Jac Fitzgerald
- Edited by: Annie Collins
- Music by: David Long
- Release date: 20 September 2012
- Running time: 106 minutes
- Country: New Zealand
- Language: English

Two Little Boys is a 2012 New Zealand feature film based on the 2008 novel of the same name by Duncan Sarkies. It stars Bret McKenzie and Hamish Blake in the two title roles, and is directed by Robert Sarkies. Duncan Sarkies served as a script writer, adapting his own novel.

== Synopsis ==
Nige and Deano are childhood friends who live in Invercargill in the South Island of New Zealand. However, estrangement has since resulted, because Nige has stopped flatting with Deano over concerns about Nige's self-perceived emotional dependence on his friend, and moved in with a third friend, Gav. However, Nige inadvertently runs over and kills a person from Norway engaging in backpacker tourism with his unreliable Ford Laser, and enlists the assistance of Deano to conceal the body, although not without reservations from Deano due to his "abandonment issues" after Nige terminated their earlier flatting cohabitation. The film also deals with the consequently bungled and incompetent police investigation into what produced this chain of events, with humorous consequences.

== Cast ==
- Bret McKenzie as Nige
- Hamish Blake as Deano
- Maaka Pohatu as Gav
- Filip Berg

== Production ==
Filming started in 2010 in the Southland District, New Zealand, and concluded in 2011.

The yellow car that Nige (Bret) drives when he ran over a backpacker (Filip) is a 1982 Ford Laser, which is on display at The Movie and TV Museum in Waipu, New Zealand, New Zealand.

== Release ==
Two Little Boys premiered at the Berlin International Film Festival in February 2012. It was initially due to open in New Zealand on 15 March 2012, but that date was later postponed to later in the year. The release date was then later shown on the Facebook page of Two Little Boys. The first trailer was released in early 2012, showing the original release date before the change.

Two Little Boys was in New Zealand cinemas by 20 September, following the New Zealand premiere held in Invercargill on 11 September 2012.
