= Tangata Pai =

New Zealand television series

- Genre: Drama
- Written by: Kiel McNaughton; Mei-Lin Te Puea Hansen; Briar Grace-Smith; Hamish Bennett
- Directed by: Kiel McNaughton
- Starring: Nicola Kāwana; Shavaughn Ruakere; Jayden Daniels; Yoson An; Ariāna Osborne; James Tito; Nikki Si'ulepa; Shania Bailey-Edmonds
- Composer: Mahuia Bridgman-Cooper
- Country of origin: New Zealand
- Original languages: English; Māori
- No. of series: 1
- No. of episodes: 8

Production
- Producer: Kerry Warkia
- Cinematography: Drew Sturge
- Running time: 42-45 minutes
- Production companies: Brown Sugar Apple Grunt Productions; Warner Bros. Discovery New Zealand

Original release
- Network: Three
- Release: 16 September – 28 October 2025

Tangata Pai is a New Zealand drama television series created and produced by Kiel McNaughton and Kerry Warkia. The series focuses on five characters—a Māori activist musician, a struggling father, a Chinese New Zealander police officer, a Māori Member of Parliament and a nurse—responding to a bomb attack targeting an anti-mining protest at a sacred Māori site in New Plymouth. Tangata Pai has 30 percent Māori dialogue. It was released on Sky's Three TV channel and the ThreeNow streaming service on 16 September 2025.

== Synopsis ==
A land occupation and a terrorist attack put a mirror up to a country still reckoning with its past. The story follows an activist musician, a conflicted cop, a grieving nurse, a struggling father, and a torn politician as they fight for justice, family, and identity.

== Cast and characters ==
- Nicola Kāwana as Ahorangi
- Shavaughn Ruakere as Hinewai
- Jayden Daniels as Miki
- Yoson An as Adrian
- Ariāna Osborne as Willa
- James Tito as Tīmoti
- Nikki Si'ulepa as Liliu Brown
- Kaylee Wipani as Jade
- Shania Bailey-Edmonds as Kaia
- John Leigh as Gary
- Jacqueline Nairn as Sandra

== Episodes ==
No.	Title	Directed by	Written by	Original release date	New Zealand viewers (millions)
1	"Season 1 Ep 1"	Kiel McNaughton	Kiel McNaughton	16 September 2025	N/A
The first episode introduces the lives of five characters prior to a bombing in response to a Māori land occupation opposed to mining in New Plymouth. Willa is an ambitious Māori musician supporting the land occupation. Miki is a protest organiser who is babysitting his son Tyrone, whose toe was crushed by a horse while playing on the beach. Chinese New Zealander policeman Adrian tries to build ties with his community while protecting his family. Government minister Ahorangi acts as a translator for her deaf daughter Jade who gives a school speech about Māori land rights, which attracts social media attention. Nurse Hinewai navigates workplace politics and relations with her estranged son Conrad. Near the end of the shift, Hinewai discovers a bomb in the hospital's reception area.
2	"Season 1 Ep 2"	Kiel McNaughton	Mei-Lin Te Puea Hansen	16 September 2025	N/A
Adrian goes off his policing duties to mediate a dispute between his brother Chris and Gary, who support and oppose the mine respectively. Senior Constable Liliu Brown chides him for breaching the New Zealand Police's policies. Willa speaks with Gary after the dispute in an attempt to calm him down. Hinewai and her colleagues implement emergency protocols at the hospital and alert the police. After arguing with Jade about politics, Ahorangi takes part in a media interview in an attempt to manage the situation. She confirms that she will be seeking a restraining order against a relative who assaulted her at a protest. After arguing about parenting, Miki and his ex partner Kaia arrive at the hospital during the evacuation with Tyrone and his severed toe. The suspected bomber watches the explosion from his utility vehicle inside a nearby carpark.
3	"Season 1 Ep 3"	Kiel McNaughton	Mei-Lin Te Puea Hansen	23 September 2025	N/A
Three months before the events of the series, Ahorangi supports the Government's plan to open a rare earths mineral mine on disputed Māori land in New Plymouth, arguing that it would bring jobs and economic development. Several of her whanau (family) clash with her. Amidst the chaos, Miki and Kaia get Tyrone admitted to New Plymouth's hospital due to his serious injury. Hinewai liaises with the Police who secure the scene while awaiting the arrival of a bomb squad from the New Zealand Defence Force. One of Hinewai's fellow nurses recalls seeing a suspicious man dressed in hospital scrubs loitering near the reception area. Adrian and his fellow Police are instructed to search for the suspect. Willa addresses Māori protesters at the protest site shortly before a bomb explodes.
4	"Season 1 Ep 4"	Kiel McNaughton	Briar Grace-Smith	30 September 2025	N/A
As the hospital staff and Police begin evacuating the patients, Adrian experiences a panic attack when he encounters Miki, which brings back memories of being assaulted while conducting a well-being check at a home. Adrian's superior sends him home but he resolves to help Hinewai find her estranged teenage son Conrad. Hinewai leads the evacuation of the emergency wing. After his son Tyrone experiences an allergic reaction to the medication, Miki is ordered to leave the hospital for attempting to smuggle his son's frozen toe. Returning home, Miki communes with his late father about his distrust of modern medicine and his affinity for natural medicine. Meanwhile, Ahorangi and Willa debate the merits of the rare earth mine. Willa publicly chastises Ahorangi as a traitor but is wrecked by guilt. Following the debate, she contacts an unknown person via phone.
5	"Season 1 Ep 5"	Kiel McNaughton	Briar Grace-Smith	7 October 2025	N/A
Following the debate, Willa argues with her friend/lover Kaia, criticising her for not being there to support her. Kaia tells Willa to stop blaming others for her problems and reveals Tyrone's medical emergency. While searching for Conrad, Adrian stumbles upon a vehicle with a damaged fuel line. Ahorangi confronts Adrian's brother, who thinks that Māori are privileged. Ahorangi explains that Māori did not cede sovereignty under the Treaty of Waitangi and chastises Adrian's brother for trying to inflame ethnic tensions through the mine debate. Miki returns to the hospital carpark in an attempt to reunite with his son but is blocked by security. After a woman confronts him about smuggling organs, Miki experiences a mental health episode and is treated by a paramedic. Meanwhile, Hinewai mends bridges with fellow nurse Sandra while the two tend to a comatose Irish patient in the intensive care unit who cannot be evacuated. A male podcaster claiming to speak for the majority makes an ominous threat.
6	"Season 1 Ep 6"	Kiel McNaughton	Hamish Bennett	14 October 2025	N/A
Jade and her friend Liam perform for Willa near the waterfront. Willa also snubs a Māori journalist seeking to interview her, who snubs her in return. Meanwhile, Ahorangi learns about the hospital bomb threat from a Parliamentary staffer, who orders her to leave New Plymouth. Her driver suspects that the hospital bomb threat was a diversion for the real attack on the land occupation site. Miki breaks into the hospital, determined to rescue his son and attracts the attention of police and hospital staff. Adrian tracks down Conrad to a high-rise waterfront carpark and stops him from committing suicide with the help of Liam. Alerted by Adrian, Hinewai gets a ride from a colleague named Ronnie.
7	"Season 1 Ep 7"	Kiel McNaughton	Hamish Bennett	21 October 2025	N/A
Willa manages to convince the Māori journalist to give her a second chance and talks about being raised by her Scottish mother after her father left her. Adrian spots the suspected bomber, who flees. Adrian convinces the organisers and Māori Wardens to commence evacuating the crowd. He is helped by Willa and Ahorangi. Liam comforts Conrad while Hinewai heads to the high rise carpark. Miki is shot by Constable Liliu and Hinewai rushes back to the hospital to treat him. While unconscious, Miki meets with Tyrone and his father in the spiritual realm. Kaia is unable to reach her son due to the police blockade. Two bombs explode simultaneously at the hospital and occupation site.
8	"Season 1 Ep 8"	Kiel McNaughton	Kiel McNaughton	28 October 2025	N/A
Adrian, Ahorangi, Willa, Miki and Hinewai are killed during the bombings at the hospital and occupation site. Their relatives and friends grieve the loss of their loved ones and hold a public memorial in New Plymouth. Liliu Brown is questioned by an internal affairs investigator for her role in shooting Miki. She expresses regret that she did not understand what he was saying in Māori. Adrian's older brother Chris meets with Conrad and his family, who thank Adrian for saving Conrad from committing suicide. Chris gains a better appreciation of Māori and his late brother. Kaia reflects on the passing of Miki.

== Production ==
=== Development and writing ===
Tangata Pai was directed by Kiel McNaughton and produced by Kerry Warkia. The series was written by McNaughton, Mei-Lin Te Puea Hansen, Briar Grace-Smith, and Hamish Bennett. Drew Sturge served as cinematographer. Veteran journalist Mereana Hond and Ruakere Hond also served as the production's Māori language and tikanga (cultural) consultants. Jared Flitcroft served as the production's New Zealand Sign Language coordinator.

McNaughton, who has familial connections to both Taranaki iwi (tribe) and Parihaka, said that Tangata Pai was inspired by past Māori historical struggles and contemporary issues such as seabed mining. He and Mereana decided to incorporate 30 percent Māori dialogue into the series as part of a memorandum of understanding between the producers and local Māori tribes. The two said that they hoped that the series would normalise the use of Māori for New Zealand viewers.

McNaughton drew inspiration for the series from his lived experiences in Hawera. During an interview with Radio New Zealand, McNaughton said that he hoped that the series would help to deepen people's understanding of others and of Aotearoa as a nation, stating:

While sometimes we can cast judgement on a protest, or an occupation, or an activist, there are people behind that, there are people whose lives are affected by that, there are people who are aware of the effect that being an activist has on other people, and the choices that those in power are making and how those affect everyday people.

The series name Tangata Pai translates from the Māori language as "Good People." According to a promotional release, each character in the series believed that they were doing what is right. The series would look the devastating consequences of their actions while exploring the theme of what it means to be "good" and who gets to decide what is good.

=== Casting ===
Ariāna Osborne was cast as Willa, an emerging politically-engaged Māori musician struggling with self-doubt and finding her whakapapa (identity). Jayden Daniels was cast as Miki, an activist and struggling father seeking to protect his son. Yoson An was cast as Adrian, a Chinese New Zealander police officer struggling between duty and identity. Shavaughn Ruakere was cast as Hinewai, a nurse and mother sacrificing everything for her people. Nicola Kāwana was cast as Ahorangi, a Māori government minister struggling to find a balance between tradition and politics.

In addition to the five mains leads, the production had about 45 supporting cast members including James Tito as Tīmoti, Nikki Si'ulepa as Senior Constable Liliu Brown, Kaylee Wipani as Ahorangi's deaf daughter Jade, Shania Bailey-Edmonds as Kaia, John Leigh as Gary, Jacqueline Nairn as Sandra, Jordan Selwyn as Tane, Tim Carlsen as Sergeant Andrew Matthews, and Billy Reynolds McCarthy as Liam. Several New Plymouth locals were also hired as extras.

To play the role of Hinewai, Ruakere drew inspiration from her previous acting work on the TVNZ drama series Shortland Street and her father and mother's experiences as a doctor and nurse. Tangata Pai was Ruakere's first major Māori language television role and she undertook language training to prepare for that role. To prepare for her role as Ahorangi, Kāwana learnt New Zealand Sign Language and the Māori language. For her character Willa, Osborne also learnt Māori. For his character Tīmoti, Tito drew upon his lived experiences as Māori person and adapted to the Taranaki dialect of the Māori language used in Tangata Pai. For her character Liliu Brown, Si'ulepa drew inspiration from her lived experiences as a Samoan New Zealander.

=== Filming ===
Tangata Pai was filmed in New Plymouth and Auckland over a six week period between mid-October and November 2024. Filming in New Plymouth centered around the Puke Ariki Landing and the surrounding streets.

The series was developed through the CAPE Showrunner Incubator and produced by Kerry Warkia and Kiel McNaughton's production company, Brown Sugar Apple Grunt Productions. Tangata Pai was made in partnership with the local Māori iwi Te Atiawa and hapū (clan) Ngāti Te Whiti through a group of tribal experts who served as cultural consultants. It also received NZ$3.9m (US$2.3m) in funding from Te Māngai Pāho (the Māori Broadcast Funding Agency) and NZ on Air in April 2024. The series also received backing from Warner Bros. Discovery New Zealand, which confirmed it would distribute it through its Three TV channel and ThreeNow streaming app.

=== Post-production and editing ===
According to McNaughton, the Tangata Pai's storyline covered the hour leading up to a terror attack. Using a real time perspective, each episode was edited to focus on eight minutes from the lives of each of the five protagonists. This plot structure was used to build tensions for the series' storyline.

The series also featured new music from several artists including Jordywithawhy, Chase Woods, Reb Fountain, Troy Kingi. Mahuia Bridgman-Cooper served as the series' composer.

== Release ==
Tangata Pai first premiered at the TSB Showplace in New Plymouth on 13 September 2025. On 14 September, a promotional trailer was also released.

The series' first two episodes were released on the Three TV channel and the ThreeNow streaming service on 16 September 2025. The subsequent six episodes were then released on a weekly basis between 23 September and 28 October 2025. The series was also screened at the 2025 Hawaii International Film Festival on 24 October.

The series was picked up by Netflix on 16 March 2026.

== Reception ==
=== Critical reception ===
Dana Leaming of The Spinoff gave a mixed review of Tangata Pai, describing it as an "ambitious drama that excels beyond its heavy handedness." She praised showrunner Kiel McNaughton for incorporating Māori language and culture into the dialogue. While Leaming regarded the split storylines converging on the main plot as "refreshing and gutsy," she observed that it also slowed down the story's pacing. Leaming was critical of the heavy-handed emphasis on activism, resistance and identity across the five character arcs, saying that it detracted from an otherwise nuanced production. She praised Shavaughn Ruakere's performance as the nurse Hinewai as "grounded and compelling" but was critical of the other five character arcs for serving as a "conduit for themes" rather than actualised people." Despite these shortcomings, Leaming praised McNaughton's intention and commitment towards the first episode for setting the stage for the series' storyline.

James Croot of The Post gave the series a positive review, writing:

Tangata Pai not only feels reflective of contemporary New Zealand, but it's also is a masterclass in how to create compelling television, from its impressive ensemble of actors to its interweaving plots and fabulous re-viewing of scenes from different angles or perspectives, without it ever feeling forced.

He also praised the multi-perspective, real time storytelling style for exploring and connecting the stories of the five main characters. Croot also credited the series' multi-perspective editing style for maximising intrigue and tension.

Tara Ward of Newstalk ZB gave the series a positive review, describing it as "clever, layered, thoughtful." She praised its 30 percent Māori language dialogue and its real-time multi-perspective storytelling focusing on five major characters. Ward described Tangata Pai as an authentically New Zealand show that "did not try and replicate overseas shows" and focused on how contemporary political issues affected ordinary people in New Zealand. Ward praised the performances of Kāwana, Ruakere and Jayden Daniels as well as the work of showrunner McNaughton.

=== Accolades ===
Tangata Pai won one award at the 2026 New Zealand Screen Awards held on 19 November 2026: "Best Performance by an Actor in a Male Role - Series" (Jayden Daniels).
