= Yoson An =

New Zealand actor (born 1992)

- Born: June 23, 1992 (age 34); Zhuhai, Guangdong, China
- Education: Saint Kentigern College (2006–2010)
- Occupations: Actor; filmmaker
- Years active: 2012–present
- Height: 1.82 m (6 ft 0 in)

Yoson An (born June 23, 1992) is a New Zealand actor and filmmaker.

== Early life ==
An was born in Guangdong and grew up learning English at an international school in Macau. His parents left China for more economic opportunities abroad, moving to Hong Kong, Perth, Sydney and New Zealand. The family settled in Auckland when An was about eight years old. He has three younger sisters.

Despite not being educated in a Chinese system, An speaks Cantonese and Mandarin fluently. However, he cannot read or write Chinese. He has learned to recognize some Han characters, though. He had an ex-girlfriend from Taiwan who helped polish up his Mandarin.

At the age of eight, An took part in his school's production of Les Misérables after a teacher learnt that he could play the piano. He late joined the school choir and became involved in school productions. An was educated at Saint Kentigern College in Pakuranga Auckland; he studied music and was part of many school productions. An initially studied economics and finance at university but returned to acting in his second year, hiring an acting coach.

== Career ==
An began acting on screen in 2012 in small projects before getting his first big break with Ghost Bride. In 2017, An was cast in Dead Lucky which he considers a big opportunity for him as it is a major leading role with Rachel Griffiths. In 2018, he made the leap to American cinema with the Walt Disney Pictures live-action film adaptation of Mulan, which reunited him with Dead Lucky co-star Xana Tang.

== Personal life ==
An is a black belt in karate, and has a black cat called Luna.

== Filmography ==
Film roles
Year	Title	Role	Notes
2013	The NoteBook	Blythe	Short film
2013	Ghost Bride	Jason	
2014	Bemuse	—N/a	Executive producer; Short film
2016	Crouching Tiger, Hidden Dragon: Sword of Destiny	Boxer #2	Also extras casting assistant
2018	Between the Parallel	—N/a	Director, executive producer, writer and editor; Short film
2018	The Meg	Chinese News Helicopter Pilot #1	
2018	Mortal Engines	Major Chen	
2018	Mega Time Squad	Wen	
2020	Weirdoes	David	
2020	Mulan	Chen Honghui	
2023	Plane	Samuel Dele	
2024	Five Blind Dates	Richard Teo	
2025	Heart Eyes	David	
2025	Shadow Force	Varjo	
2025	Site	Jian	

Television roles
Year	Title	Role	Notes
2014	Flat3	Yoson	Web series
2014	Grace	Ricky	Miniseries
2018	Dead Lucky	Charlie Fung	Main cast
2019	Fresh Eggs	Justin	Main cast
2019	Tales of Nai Nai	Shizi (voice)	Episode: "Seems Dramatic"
2020	The Luminaries	Sook Yongsheng	
2021	New Gold Mountain	Leung Wei Shing	
2025	Tangata Pai	Adrian	Main cast

Video game roles
Year	Title	Role
2012	Path of Exile	Tasuni

== Theatre ==
Theatre roles
Year	Title	Role	Notes
2015	The Mooncake and the Kumara	Yee	Directed by Katie Wolfe
