= What We Do in the Shadows (franchise) =

Comedy media franchise

- Official franchise logo, as released in 2019.
- Created by: Jemaine Clement; Taika Waititi
- Original work: What We Do in the Shadows: Interviews with Some Vampires (2005)
- Years: 2005–2024

Films and television
- Film: What We Do in the Shadows (2014)
- Television series: Wellington Paranormal (2018–22); What We Do in the Shadows (2019–24)

What We Do in the Shadows is a New Zealand multimedia franchise centred on comedy documentaries of paranormal creatures, primarily vampires. The vampires are generally situated in a modern, mundane setting which contrasts with their more ethereal, gothic natures. Originally created by Taika Waititi and Jemaine Clement for a short film in their early careers, the franchise received a theatrical adaptation in 2014 and achieved widespread popularity. A critical success, the franchise was then diversified into television, with the New Zealand series Wellington Paranormal (2018–2022) and the American series What We Do in the Shadows (2019–2024).

The franchise has been largely inactive since the cancellation of the American series, however Waititi and Clement are currently writing the script for the spin-off film We're Wolves, and estimate the script will be complete in 2027.

== History ==
=== Original short and feature film (2005–2015) ===
The franchise originated in 2005 with a short film written by Taika Waititi and Jemaine Clement, then still in their early careers. The single camera mockumentary, What We Do in the Shadows: Interviews with Some Vampires was shot on a budget of only $200. The film was made amid a wave of interest in horror comedy at the time; Vox compared the short to Shaun of the Dead (2004).

Clement and Waititi returned almost a decade later to write a feature length version, simply titled What We Do in the Shadows. In the interim both comedians had made successful careers, with Clement's Flight of the Concords and Waititi's Boy. The early 2010s had seen several horror comedy films flop, and there was some reluctance from producers to make the film, but work proceeded. It initially ran only in New Zealand in 2014, and did not attract enough attention at the time for international distribution. A North American release of the film was only possible through a Kickstarter funding drive in February and March 2015, which earned $450,000, and it sold well overseas.

The film was widely shared online, becoming the most pirated film of 2015 and a cult phenomenon. GIFs from the film were shared broadly; Vox has suggested that the nature of the film was well suited to the sort of viral clips used in GIFs- similar to the unintentionally memetic nature of The Emperor's New Groove. Both piracy and GIF usage aided its popularity. Two further shorts were also filmed around the time of the feature release.

=== Television adaptations (2018–2024) ===
Two television adaptations began airing in the late 2010s. The first of these was a New Zealand series Wellington Paranormal, which followed the two bumbling police officers from the film as they join a paranormal investigation unit of the New Zealand Police. The show was led by Clement & Waititi, starred Mike Minogue and Karen O'Leary, and ran for four seasons. During the COVID-19 pandemic the characters also appeared in a digital series of public health announcements, made by the New Zealand Government. A 30 episode podcast on the making of the show also aired from 2023 to 2024, with Minogue and O'Leary returning to host it.

An American series simply titled What We Do in the Shadows starred a new group of vampires in Staten Island and aired from 2019 to 2024. It was greenlit after a successful 2018 pilot, which was written by Jemaine Clement and directed by Taika Waititi. The two occasionally made guest appearances as their characters from the film, but the show otherwise stars the Staten Island group- Nandor (Kayvan Novak), Laszlo (Matt Berry), Nadja (Natasia Demetriou) Guillermo (Harvey Guillén) and Colin (Mark Proksch). The Guide (Kristen Schaal) was initially a recurring character and then joined the primary cast from season 5.

== Short films ==
Film	Release date	Director(s)	Screenwriter(s)	Producer
What We Do in the Shadows: Interviews with Some Vampires	January 1, 2005	Taika Waititi & Jemaine Clement	Taika Waititi & Jemaine Clement	Tyler Cogan
Dating 101 with Viago	May 22, 2014	Taika Waititi	Taika Waititi	Angela Meyer
A Vampire's Guide to Vellington	June 8, 2014	Taika Waititi	Taika Waititi	David Perks

=== What We Do in the Shadows: Interviews with Some Vampires (2005) ===
The original 29-minute short film by Taika Waititi & Jemaine Clement, which inspired their 2014 film. In the short, three vampires—Deacon Brugh (Jonny Brugh), Count Viago (Waititi), and Vulvus the Abhorrent (Clement)—who share an apartment are interviewed by a TV crew.

=== Dating 101 with Viago (2014) ===
A short film and advertisement campaign to promote the online dating services FindSomeone and Dating for Shoes. The film follows Dating for Shoes founder Angela Meyer giving Viago a tutorial on creating his own FindSomeone profile: from creating a username, to describing his hobbies and interests.

=== Vampire's Guide to Vellington (2014) ===
A short film and advertisement campaign by Wellington, as a comedic promotion that the city is a vampire-friendly place to visit. The film follows vampire Viago promoting the nightlife, cinemas and clothes shops of the city alongside his flatmates Vladislav and Deacon. As part of the campaign, the 'W' in the Wellington Blown Away sign on Miramar hill was temporarily changed to a blood-red 'V'.

== Films ==
Film	N.Z. release date	U.S. release date	Directors	Screenwriters	Producers	Status
What We Do in the Shadows	January 9, 2014	February 13, 2015	Taika Waititi & Jemaine Clement	Taika Waititi & Jemaine Clement	Taika Waititi, Emanuel Michael & Chelsea Winstanley	Released
We're Wolves	TBA	TBA	TBA	Taika Waititi & Jemaine Clement	TBA	In development

=== What We Do in the Shadows (2014) ===
Vampire housemates (Jemaine Clement, Taika Waititi, Jonathan Brugh) cope with the complexities of modern life and introduce a newly turned vampire to the benefits of being undead.

=== We're Wolves (TBA) ===
A sequel to the What We Do in the Shadows, focused on the werewolves depicted in the film, originally rumoured to be titled What We Do in the Moonlight, was announced as being in development in August 2015. In May 2019 Taika Waititi said "We're Wolves is the film that Jemaine and I keep pretending that we're making. Every couple of years we say, we're making this new film called We're Wolves which follows the werewolves from the film," said Waititi. "I feel bad to even mention it now because we keep saying it, [but] it’s like a dad saying, ‘Yeah, I’ll be home for Christmas.’ I suppose we're just two dads out on the road enjoying our lives and going, 'We're not coming home for Christmas.' We'll send a postcard. It's not like we don't want to come home for Christmas. We would like nothing more but we have a lot of shit going on. When are you going to die? Do you have a ... deadline before your death? I guarantee it before then. Five years, 10 years? It took us seven years to write the [first] film, so you do the math. That was a sad thing to say."

It was confirmed in June 2026 that the film would be moving ahead, with writing having begun. Waititi estimated the script would be ready in 2027.

== Television ==
Series	Season	Episodes	Originally released			Showrunner(s)
Series	Season	Episodes	First released	Last released	Network	Showrunner(s)
Wellington Paranormal	1	6	11 July 2018	15 August 2018	* TVNZ 2 (New Zealand): The CW (United States)	Taika Waititi & Jemaine Clement
Wellington Paranormal	2	6	16 October 2019	20 November 2019	* TVNZ 2 (New Zealand): The CW (United States)	Taika Waititi & Jemaine Clement
Wellington Paranormal	Special		19 December 2019		* TVNZ 2 (New Zealand): The CW (United States)	Taika Waititi & Jemaine Clement
Wellington Paranormal	3	6	24 February 2021	31 March 2021	* TVNZ 2 (New Zealand): The CW (United States)	Taika Waititi & Jemaine Clement
Wellington Paranormal	4	6	16 February 2022	23 March 2022	* TVNZ 2 (New Zealand): The CW (United States)	Taika Waititi & Jemaine Clement
What We Do in the Shadows	1	10	March 27, 2019	May 29, 2019	FX	Paul Simms
What We Do in the Shadows	2	10	April 15, 2020	June 10, 2020	FX	Paul Simms
What We Do in the Shadows	3	10	September 2, 2021	October 28, 2021	FX	Paul Simms
What We Do in the Shadows	4	10	July 12, 2022	September 6, 2022	FX	Paul Simms
What We Do in the Shadows	5	10	July 13, 2023	August 31, 2023	FX	Paul Simms
What We Do in the Shadows	6	11	October 21, 2024	December 16, 2024	FX	Paul Simms

=== Wellington Paranormal (2018–2022) ===
The series follows Officers Minogue and O'Leary, who originally appeared as secondary characters in the 2014 film. They join a paranormal division of the Wellington Police Department under Sergeant Maaka (Maaka Pohatu). The show debuted on TVNZ 2 in 2018, and was renewed several times. The fourth and final season aired in 2022.

=== What We Do in the Shadows (2019–2024) ===
The series follows four vampire roommates and one vampire familiar living on Staten Island.

In May 2020, the series was ordered for a third season, while season two was still airing. Production for season three was set to start in February 2021, before being postponed to later in 2021 due to the COVID-19 pandemic.

== Digital series ==
Important COVID-19 Messages from Wellington Paranormal is a sixteen-episode digital web series and public service campaign released in 2020 by New Zealand Police to inform the public on health, safety, and best practices during the COVID-19 pandemic. The series follows Officers Minogue and O'Leary in home isolation, and features several guests including Sergeant Maaka and Officer Parker. The series also includes Andrew Coster and Clarke Gayford as themselves.

== Main cast and characters ==
List indicators

This section includes characters who will appear or have appeared in noteworthy roles.

- An empty grey cell indicates the character was not in the installment, or that the character's official presence has not yet been confirmed.
- ^{A} indicates an appearance through archival footage or audio.
- ^{C} indicates a cameo role.
- ^{G} indicates a guest appearance in the installment.
- ^{P} indicates an appearance in onscreen photographs.
- ^{R} indicates a recurring role in the installment.
- ^{V} indicates a voice-only role.

Character	Film		Television									
Character	Short films	What We Do in the Shadows	Wellington Paranormal				What We Do in the Shadows					
Character	Short films	What We Do in the Shadows	1	2	3	4	1	2	3	4	5	6
Viago Von Dorna Schmarten Scheden Heimburg	Taika Waititi	Taika Waititi					Taika Waititi^{G}	Taika Waititi^{A}	Taika Waititi^{R}			
Vladislav "The Poker" Pokeris	Jemaine Clement	Jemaine Clement		Jemaine Clement^{V}			Jemaine Clement	Jemaine Clement				
Deacon Brucke	Jonny Brugh	Jonny Brugh					Jonny Brugh^{G}	Jonny Brugh^{A}				
Officer Kyle Minogue	Mike Minogue	Mike Minogue	Mike Minogue	Mike Minogue	Mike Minogue	Mike Minogue						
Officer O'Leary	Karen O'Leary	Karen O'Leary	Karen O'Leary	Karen O'Leary	Karen O'Leary	Karen O'Leary						
Nick Macure	Cori Gonzalez-Macuer	Cori Gonzalez-Macuer	Cori Gonzalez-Macuer									
Wesley the Daywalker		Wesley Snipes^{P}					Wesley Snipes^{G}					
Anton the Park Ranger		Rhys Darby			Rhys Darby^{G}							
Dion		Cohen Holloway	Cohen Holloway									
Petyr		Ben Fransham										
Stu		Stu Rutherford										
Clifton		Simon Vincent										
Jackie		Jackie van Beek										
Julian		Jason Hoyte										
Katherine Heimburg		Ethel Robinson										
Pauline "The Beast"		Elena Stejko										
Sergeant Ruawai Maaka	Maaka Pohatu		Maaka Pohatu	Maaka Pohatu	Maaka Pohatu	Maaka Pohatu						
Constable Parker	Thomas Sainsbury		Thomas Sainsbury	Thomas Sainsbury	Thomas Sainsbury	Thomas Sainsbury						
Mrs. O'Leary				Lynda Topp	Lynda Topp	Lynda Topp						
Nandor the Relentless							Kayvan Novak	Kayvan Novak	Kayvan Novak	Kayvan Novak	Kayvan Novak	Kayvan Novak
Laszlo Cravensworth							Matt Berry	Matt Berry	Matt Berry	Matt Berry	Matt Berry	Matt Berry
Nadja (& Nadja Doll)							Natasia Demetriou	Natasia Demetriou	Natasia Demetriou	Natasia Demetriou	Natasia Demetriou	Natasia Demetriou
Guillermo De la Cruz							Harvey Guillén	Harvey Guillén	Harvey Guillén	Harvey Guillén	Harvey Guillén	Harvey Guillén
Colin Robinson (I & II)							Mark Proksch	Mark Proksch	Mark Proksch	Mark Proksch	Mark Proksch	Mark Proksch
Sean							Anthony Atamanuik^{R}	Anthony Atamanuik^{R}	Anthony Atamanuik^{R}	Anthony Atamanuik^{R}	Anthony Atamanuik^{R}	Anthony Atamanuik^{R}
Jeff Suckler / Gregor							Jake McDorman^{R}	Jake McDorman^{G}				
Simon the Devious							Nick Kroll^{G}	Nick Kroll^{G}		Nick Kroll^{G}		
Baron Afanas							Doug Jones^{R}	Doug Jones^{A}	Doug Jones^{R}	Doug Jones^{R}	Doug Jones^{R}	Doug Jones^{R}
The Guide							Kristen Schaal^{G}		Kristen Schaal^{R}	Kristen Schaal	Kristen Schaal	Kristen Schaal
Jenna							Beanie Feldstein^{R}					

== Additional crew and production details ==
Title	Crew/Detail					
Title	Composer(s)	Cinematographer(s)	Editors	Production companies	Distributing companies	Running time
What We Do in the Shadows	Plan 9	D.J. Stipsen; Richard Bluck	Tom Eagles; Yana Gorskaya; Jonathan Woodford-Robinson	Unison Films; Defender Films; Funny or Die Films; New Zealand Film Commission; Resnick Interactive Development	The Orchard Films; Paramount Pictures; Madman Entertainment	1hr 25mins
Wellington Paranormal	Jemaine Clement	D.J. Stipsen	Tom Eagles; Shawn Paper; Angela Boyd	New Zealand Documentary Board	Television New Zealand	6hrs
What We Do in the Shadows (The Series)	Mark Mothersbaugh	D.J. Stipsen; Christian Sprenger	Tom Eagles; Shawn Paper; Yana Gorskaya; Dane McMaster; Daniel Haworth; Varun Viswanath; Joseph Ettinger; Antonia de Barros	FX Productions; 343 Incorporated; Two Canoes Pictures	20th Television; Disney Media Distribution; 20th Century Fox Television	10hrs
We're Wolves	TBA	TBA	TBA	TBA	TBA	TBA

== Reception ==
=== Box office and financial performance ===
Film	Box office gross			Box office ranking		Budget	Ref.
Film	North America	Other territories	Worldwide	All-time North America	All-time worldwide	Budget	Ref.
What We Do in the Shadows	$3,469,224	$5,012,132	$8,481,356	#6,798	#5,750	$1,600,000	

=== Critical and public response ===
Title	Rotten Tomatoes	Metacritic
What We Do in the Shadows	96% (186 reviews)	76/100 (33 reviews)
Wellington Paranormal	98% (39 combined total series reviews)	72/100 (12 reviews)
What We Do in the Shadows (The Series)	98% (170 combined total series reviews)	79/100 (41 reviews)
