= Mahana (film) =

2016 film by Lee Tamahori

- Directed by: Lee Tamahori
- Written by: John Collee
- Based on: Bulibasha: King of the Gypsies by Witi Ihimaera
- Produced by: Janine Dickins; Robin Scholes; Timothy White
- Starring: Temuera Morrison; Nancy Brunning; Te Kohe Tuhaka; Stephen Lovatt; John Leigh; Akuhata Keefe
- Cinematography: Ginny Loane
- Edited by: Michael Horton; Jonathan Woodford-Robinson
- Music by: Mahuia Bridgman-Cooper; Tama Waipara
- Production companies: Jump Film and Television
- Release date: February 13, 2016 (New Zealand)
- Running time: 103 minutes
- Country: New Zealand
- Languages: English; Te Reo Māori

Mahana (released outside New Zealand as The Patriarch) is a 2016 New Zealand period drama film directed by Lee Tamahori and written by John Collee, based on Witi Ihimaera's 2005 novel Bulibasha: King of the Gypsies. It stars Temuera Morrison, Nancy Brunning, Te Kohe Tuhaka, and Stephen Lovatt.

The film tells the story of two rival Māori families, the Mahanas and the Poatas, whose enmity purportedly dates back to Tamihana Mahana falling in love with Ramona and rescuing her from her betrothed, Rupeni Poata, who she does not marry. By the late 1950s, Tamihana is the patriarch of the Mahana clan, running a successful sheep shearing family business, while his grandson Simeon chafes under his authoritarian rule.

== Plot ==
In the late 1950s, patriarch Tamihana Mahana heads the Mahana clan, runs their successful sheep shearing family business in the Gisborne District, managing the family with an iron fist. En route to the funeral of an important contact, the Mahanas race against long-time rivals the Poatas to the church to secure a contract.

As punishment for making snide remarks during the family's dinner grace prayer, Tamihana assigns grandson Simeon household chores. While cleaning his grandmother Ramona's study, he finds a photograph of her and Rupeni Poata. Later, when Simeon shows it to his mother Huria and his aunts, she chides him for digging into family history, insisting Ramona cannot stand Rupeni. Simeon later asks Ramona about the photograph, who avoids talking about it but remarks that "men fight for what they want".

The following day, Tamihana tasks Simeon with transporting a slain sheep to family at a distant shearing station. On the way, he discovers Ramona's abandoned homestead. At the shearing station, Simeon discovers his grandfather sent him needlessly. When he vents his resentment towards his grandfather, his mother reminds him that Tamihana controls their livelihood.

Tamihana later allows Simeon and his other grandchildren to go to the local cinema to see the Western film 3:10 to Yuma. The screening is disrupted when local youth Mihaere Poata rides his horse into the theatre.

As chaos erupts, Poppy Poata sneaks a kiss with Simeon. The next day, he and his class take a school trip to the local courthouse. (At the time, the Māori language was not allowed in courtrooms, among other places.) One of the defendants is Mihaere Poata, who gets a two year prison sentence for criminal mischief.

As Simeon's teacher Mr. McKenzie asks him to address the judge on behalf of the class, Simeon gives a heartfelt speech criticizing Mihaere's overly harsh punishment and the ban on Māori, rather than simply thanking him for allowing them to witness court proceedings. Outside the courthouse, Simeon's courage is praised by both his teacher and Rupeni Poata.

Back at the Mahanas, displeased with Simeon for interacting with Rupeni, Tamihana attempts to punish him by forcibly cutting his hair and decreeing the children may no longer attend the cinema. Simeon's father Joshua rushes to his defense, accidentally striking Tamihana.

The enraged patriarch disinherits Joshua, Huria, and their children, exiling them from the farm. Ramona intervenes and, over her husband's protests, bequeaths her house and land to them. Simeon and his family work hard to restore the dilapidated house. Ramona also visits to give moral support. Simeon's aunt Miriam and her partner Pani later join his family when they are similarly banished.

One night while trying to repair their leaky roof during a storm, Joshua falls off, breaking his leg. Huria sends Simeon to seek Tamihana's help. Knowing his hard-hearted grandfather will not come, Simeon instead goes to Rupeni, who outfits Joshua with a Thomas splint.

Joshua's injury forces Simeon and his family to seek the district's seasonal shearing contract to make enough money to survive, which usually goes to Tamihana's crews. This further increases friction between Joshua's and Tamihana's families, but Joshua's family eventually wins it.

Some time later, at the local sheep-shearing competition in which Joshua, Simeon and Pani enter as contestants, Tamihana suddenly falls, and Ramona privately reveals to Simeon that he has terminal bowel cancer. She also divulges the truth behind the Mahana-Poata rivalry: she truly loved Rupeni but Tamihana did not rescue her, but actually raped her so she, becoming pregnant, was forced by the elders to marry him according to the prevailing traditions.

That night, on his deathbed, Tamihana reaches an understanding with Simeon, giving him a hidden letter; he passes away soon after. During Tamihana's funeral, the Poata clan, led by Rupeni, arrives unannounced.

Simeon prevents a fight from breaking out by revealing the contents of Tamihana's letter. In it he admits to Ramona's rape and also reveals the written agreement between Tamihana and Ramona that she could return to Rupeni following his death. After some debate, Ramona defends her grandson, confessing she never loved Tamihana.

The clans reconcile, and Rupeni praises Simeon for bringing them peace. Rupeni and Ramona leave together, and Simeon begins dating Poppy.

== Cast ==
- Temuera Morrison as Tamihana Mahana
- Akuhata Keefe as Simeon Mahana
- Nancy Brunning as Ramona Mahana
- Jim Moriarty as Rupeni Poata
- Regan Taylor as Joshua Mahana
- Maria Walker as Huria Mahana
- Sienna MacKinlay as Gloria Mahana
- Tuhiwhakauraoterangi Wallace-Ihakara as Hope Mahana
- Kyra McRae as Faith Mahana
- Eds Eramiha as Pani
- Ngahuia Piripi as Miriam Mahana
- Yvonne Porter as Poppy Poata
- Te Kohe Tuhaka as Caesar Poata
- Fraser Brown as Mr. McKenzie
- Adam Gardiner as Dr. Gillespie
- Stephen Lovatt as Judge Hughes
- Edwin Wright as Defence Lawyer
- Aaron Ward as Prosecution Lawyer
- Paul Yates as Minister
- Greg Johnson as Golden Shears Commentator
- John Leigh as Golden Shears Announcer
- Alistair Browning as Mr. Mervyn Williams
- Matariki Whatarau as Mohi
- Peter Fifield as Background Extra
- James Fifield as Background Extra

== Production ==
Mahana was produced by the New Zealand-based production company Jump Film and Television. The movie was funded by several parties including the New Zealand Film Commission, New Zealand On Air, Māori Television, Entertainment One, Wild Bunch, and several private equity investors. In addition, Mahana was the first New Zealand film to be funded through the Snowball Effect equity crowdfunding platform. While the source novel Bulibasha: King of the Gypsies is set in New Zealand's Gisborne District, filming for Mahana took place in the countryside outside Auckland, the country's largest city.

== Release and reception ==
Mahana has received positive reviews from critics. The movie received an 85% rating on the film review website Rotten Tomatoes. The movie was first screened at the 2016 Berlin Film Festival on February 13, 2016, prior to its New Zealand debut on March 3, 2016. The Guardian reviewer Henry Barnes awarded the film three out of five stars. Despite its simplistic and romantic storyline, Barnes described Mahana as a story that could apply to every family "whose male leader forgets that his role is to offer support, love and security—not hard-hearted rule." The Hollywood Reporter's Dave Rooney described Mahana as an old-fashioned family saga with conflicting impulses. He criticized John Collee's script-writing, commenting that the "on-the-nose dialogue, ripe melodrama and preprogrammed emotional responses will test all but the most forgiving viewers".

Stuff.co.nz reviewer Graeme Tuckett praised the film, describing it as "having all its pieces present and correct". Tuckett also likened Mahana to Lee Tamahori's 1994 film Once Were Warriors and praised Ginni Loane's incorporation of landscapes and interior shots into the cinematography. However, Tuckett criticized the film for its predictable and melodramatic storyline. Newshub reviewer Kate Rodger awarded the film three out of five stars; praising the performance of the main cast including Temuera Morrison, Nancy Brunning, and Akuhata Keefe. Rodger also praised Loane's cinematography for immersing the viewer "entirely in the back blocks of New Zealand's rich farming heritage and lending a very tangible and convincing authenticity to the story." The New Zealand Herald's reviewer described Mahana as a "Māori story with universal appeal" and credited the screenwriter John Collee for adapting Witi Ihimaera's novel Bulibasha: King of the Gypsies into a "tight family saga of promises broken and secrets kept."

The Sydney Morning Herald reviewer Paul Byrnes praised Mahana as a landmark film in Māori cinematography, describing it "as an engrossing narrative on a grand scale about quotidian lives." Byrnes also opined that the film dealt with manhood, masculinity, and feminine power within families.
