= What We Do in the Shadows =

2014 film by Taika Waititi and Jemaine Clement

- Theatrical release poster
- Directed by: Jemaine Clement; Taika Waititi
- Written by: Jemaine Clement; Taika Waititi
- Based on: What We Do In The Shadows: Interviews With Some Vampires by Taika Waititi & Jemaine Clement
- Produced by: Taika Waititi; Chelsea Winstanley; Emanuel Michael
- Starring: Jemaine Clement; Taika Waititi; Jonathan Brugh; Cori Gonzalez-Macuer; Stu Rutherford
- Cinematography: D. J. Stipsen; Richard Bluck
- Edited by: Jonathan Woodford-Robinson; Yana Gorskaya; Tom Eagles
- Music by: Plan 9
- Production companies: Resnick Interactive Development; Unison Films; Defender Films; New Zealand Film Commission
- Distributed by: Madman Entertainment (New Zealand & Australia); Unison/Paladin (United States)
- Release dates: 19 January 2014 (Sundance); 19 June 2014 (New Zealand); 13 February 2015 (United States)
- Running time: 85 minutes
- Country: New Zealand
- Language: English
- Budget: $1.6 million
- Box office: $7.3 million

What We Do in the Shadows is a 2014 New Zealand mockumentary comedy horror film written and directed by Jemaine Clement and Taika Waititi and the first installment in the What We Do in the Shadows franchise. The film also stars Clement and Waititi, along with Jonathan Brugh, Ben Fransham, Cori Gonzalez-Macuer, Stu Rutherford, and Jackie van Beek. The film's plot concerns several vampires who live together in a flat in Wellington.

What We Do in the Shadows premiered at the Sundance Film Festival in January 2014. It was released theatrically on 18 August 2014 by Madman Entertainment and received critical acclaim. The film earned $6.9 million on a $1.6 million budget.

== Plot ==
A documentary crew follows four vampire housemates—Viago, Vladislav, Deacon, and Petyr—who share a flat in the Wellington suburb of Te Aro. All of the vampires possess supernatural powers, including levitation and the ability to transform into animals. Viago is a 17th-century dandy who originally traveled to New Zealand in the 1940s in search of Katherine, the love of his life; Vladislav is a 12th-century former tyrant known as "Vladislav the Poker", who is haunted by memories of his nemesis "the Beast"; and Deacon is a 19th-century former peddler and the "young rebel" of the group who was turned into a vampire by Petyr—a reclusive, ancient vampire who behaves like a feral animal and resembles Count Orlok.

Each night, Viago, Vladislav, and Deacon take the bus into town and prowl the streets of Wellington to feed. Deacon's human familiar, Jackie, runs errands for the vampires and cleans up the gore left behind by their feeding. A married mother, Jackie hopes to attain immortality, but is frustrated that Deacon will not turn her into a vampire as promised. Deacon requests that Jackie bring virgins to the flat so that the vampires can feed on them. She lures a woman who insulted her in primary school and her ex-boyfriend Nick to the flat. Though neither are actually virgins, the woman is killed, and Nick is chased throughout the flat and manages to get outside, only to be caught by Petyr, who turns him into a vampire.

Two months later, the vampires accept Nick into their group and bond with his human friend Stu, a computer analyst who introduces them to modern technology. Viago uses the Internet to find Katherine, who is now a 96-year-old widow living in a rest home in Wellington, and also briefly reconnects with his old servant Philip.

Despite being able to get his new friends into popular bars and clubs, Nick struggles to adapt to life as a vampire. Nick is also held in contempt by Deacon, who resents Nick's newfound popularity and the careless revealing of his vampirism to strangers he meets. One of these strangers, a vampire hunter, breaks into the flat basement during the day and kills Petyr by exposing him to sunlight.

The vampires are furious when they discover Nick has indirectly caused Petyr's death, and Deacon tries to kill Nick before being interrupted by a police welfare check, but Viago hypnotises them into not noticing anything out of the ordinary. Once the police leave, Nick is banished from the flat by the remaining vampires, though Stu is permitted to come as he pleases.

Several months later, the vampires receive an invitation to the annual Unholy Masquerade, hosted for the local undead population of vampires, zombies, and witches. Vladislav refuses to attend after learning that "the Beast" will be the guest of honour. When Viago and Deacon arrive at the ball, they find in attendance Nick, Stu, and Jackie, the latter of whom has been turned into a vampire by Nick. "The Beast" is revealed to be Vladislav's ex-girlfriend Pauline, and when Stu and the camera crew are discovered to be living humans, the party guests threaten to kill and feed on them. Vladislav arrives and fights with Pauline's new boyfriend Julian. Stu impales Julian on a flagpole, and the vampires and camera crew escape the ball with him, only to encounter a rival pack of werewolves who transform under the full moon. One of the cameramen is violently murdered, and Stu is mauled and torn apart. Believing Stu to be dead, the vampires run away and grieve for him.

After an indeterminate amount of time, Nick returns to the flat with Stu, who reveals he has survived the attack and was transformed into a werewolf. With Stu's urging, the pack visits the vampires along with Stu, and Nick's banishment is rescinded as well. Though momentarily apprehensive, Deacon invites the werewolf pack inside. Viago also reconnects and rekindles his romance with Katherine, whom he turns into a vampire. Scenes during the credits reveal that Vladislav has gotten back together with Pauline, repeating his cycle of self-inflicted torture over his relationship with her, and Jackie's husband is now serving as her familiar. A post-credits scene shows Deacon attempting to hypnotise the audience to forget the events of the film.

== Cast ==
- Taika Waititi as Viago, a 379-year-old vampire and uptight member of the household. Waititi based his performance on his own mother.
- Jemaine Clement as Vladislav the Poker, an 862-year-old vampire and former tyrant with extreme powers. Clement based his performance on Gary Oldman's portrayal of Count Dracula in Bram Stoker's Dracula (1992).
- Jonathan Brugh as Deacon Brucke, a 183-year-old vampire and "young rebel" of the group who is fond of knitting, erotic dancing, and "being cool".
- Ben Fransham as Petyr, an 8,000-year-old Nosferatu-like vampire who lives on the bottom floor of the flat in a stone coffin and generally keeps to himself.
- Cori Gonzalez-Macuer as Nick, an intended human victim who is turned into a vampire by Petyr.
- Stu Rutherford as Stu, Nick's human best friend who introduces the vampires to modern technology.
- Jackie van Beek as Jackie, Deacon's human familiar who cleans up after the vampires and connects them with potential victims.
- Rhys Darby as Anton, the leader of a local pack of werewolves.
- Ethel Robinson as Katherine Heimburg, the human love of Viago's life.
- Elena Stejko as Pauline Ivanovich, a vampire and Vladislav's ex-girlfriend whom he calls "The Beast".
- Jason Hoyte as Julian, a vampire and Pauline's boyfriend.
- Karen O'Leary as Officer O'Leary, a human police officer who gets called to the vampires' house.
- Mike Minogue as Officer Minogue, a human police officer who gets called to the vampires' house.

== Production ==
The film is based on a 2005 short film—What We Do In The Shadows: Interviews With Some Vampires—written and directed by Waititi and Clement, and starring Jonny Brugh, Cori Gonzalez-Macuer and Stu Rutherford in their roles of Deacon, Nick and Stu respectively. The feature film adaptation was shot in Wellington in September 2012, and was Waititi's first feature since Boy.

Rutherford, an IT technician and high school friend of Waititi's, was initially told he would only have a bit part in the film so he would act more natural when filming. He did not realise his role was so important until the film's premiere.

According to Waititi and Clement, their favourite vampire films are The Lost Boys, Bram Stoker's Dracula and Interview with the Vampire. All of those movies are heavily quoted or referenced in the film, along with many other genre films such as Blade, Twilight and Buffy The Vampire Slayer.

What We Do in the Shadows raised $447,000 towards the film from over 7,000 supporters via the crowdfunding website Kickstarter.

== Music ==
The score for the film was composed by Plan 9. The film's opening credits feature the song "You're Dead" by Norma Tanega, after Clement and Waititi were introduced to the song by film editor Tom Eagles. The film's trailer and ending feature the song "Lastochka" by the Russian rock band Leningrad.

The scene where Deacon dances, as Viago and Vlad watch, features a musical piece titled Momil Rano by Iqbal Jogi and Group from the Thar Desert on Indo-Pakistan border. However this musical piece has been credited incorrectly in the movie, where it is called Lal Mori Pat.

== Release ==
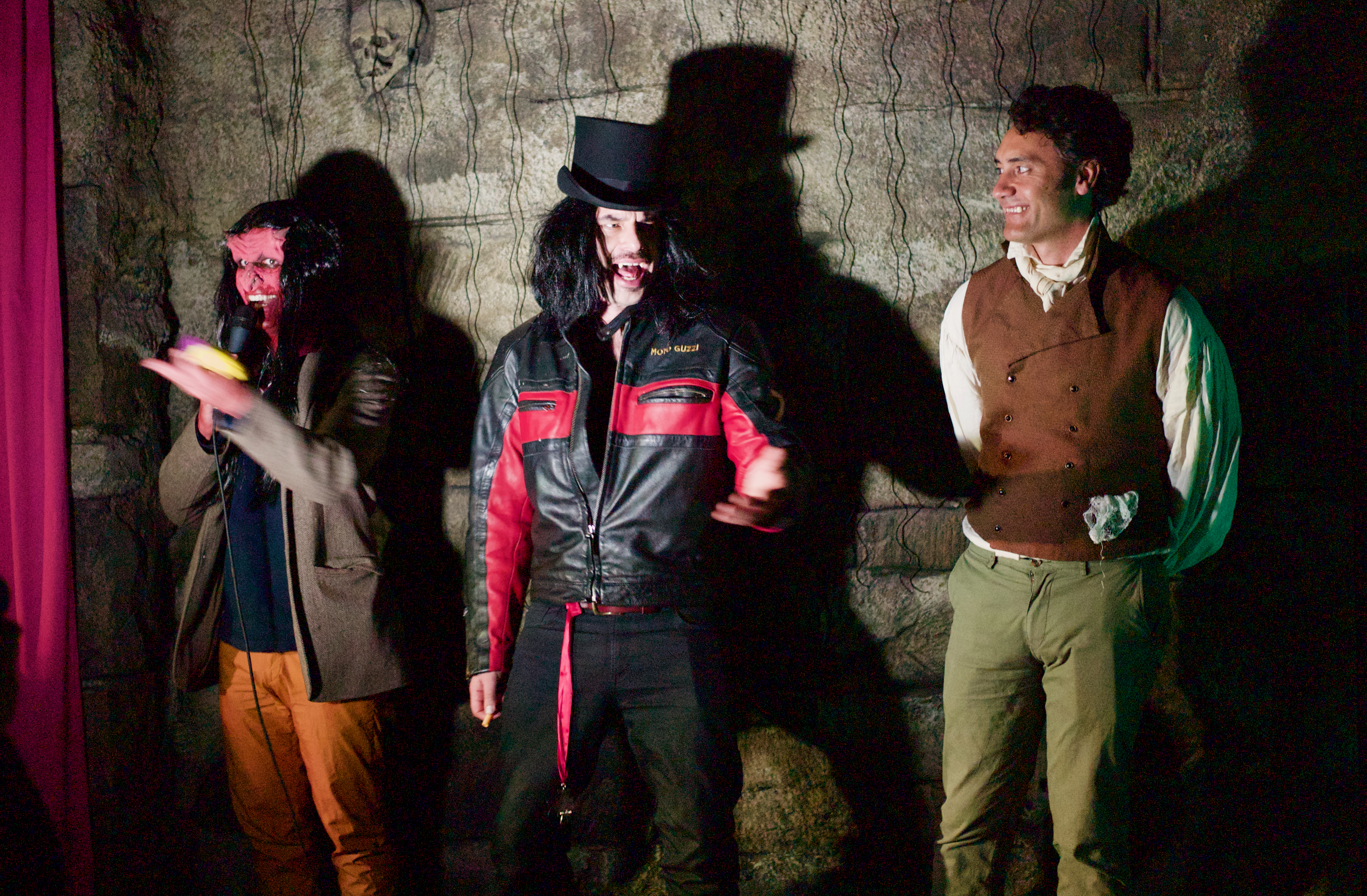
Jemaine Clement and Taika Waititi at Berlin Dungeon for the German movie opening party 2014

What We Do in the Shadows was released in a limited release on 13 February 2015 in New York City and Los Angeles, followed by a screening in San Francisco, Irvine, Philadelphia, Boston, Seattle, and Washington, D.C. The film received a regional release in the U.S. in March 2015, by Unison Films, The Orchard, and Paramount Pictures in association with Funny or Die and Paladin Pictures.

The film was heavily pirated. After the shutting down of a piracy website based in Mount Wellington, Auckland, the website revealed that, at 277,000 downloads, What We Do in the Shadows was one of its most heavily pirated films.

=== Critical response ===
On Rotten Tomatoes the film holds an approval rating of 96% based on 192 reviews, with an average rating of 7.80/10. The site's critical consensus reads: "Smarter, fresher, and funnier than a modern vampire movie has any right to be, What We Do in the Shadows is bloody good fun." On Metacritic the film has a weighted average score of 76 out of 100, based on 33 critics, indicating "generally favorable reviews".

Fearnet called the film "a great vampire comedy". Film School Rejects wrote a predominantly positive review, commenting that some of the film's broader moments fell flat but compared it favourably to similar mockumentaries such as Best in Show. The film was warmly received by UK newspapers, with The Guardian's film critic Peter Bradshaw describing it as "the best comedy of the year", while The Telegraph's Tim Robey found it "desperately funny". Film International, in a positive review, commended the film for noting, with a double of Count Orlok locked in the vampires' basement, that the true vampire film tradition is repressed by the current craze. Variety was more critical, writing that "Some genre fans who prefer the silly to the satiric may bite, but the anemic pic isn't remotely weird or witty enough for cult immortality."

=== Box office ===
The film grossed $5.9 million globally, of which $3.2 million was in the United States.

=== Home media ===
What We Do in the Shadows was released on DVD and Blu-ray on 26 November 2014 by Weltkino Filmverleih.

== Proposed sequel ==
A sequel to the film, focused on the werewolves depicted in What We Do in the Shadows, was in development, but stopped due to some unresolved production issues. Originally rumored to be titled What We Do in the Moonlight, the working title was later announced as We're Wolves.

In May 2019, Waititi said "We're Wolves is the film that Jemaine and I keep pretending that we're making. Every couple of years we say, we're making this new film called 'We're Wolves' which follows the werewolves from the film. I feel bad to even mention it now because we keep saying it, [but] it's like a dad saying, 'Yeah, I'll be home for Christmas.' I suppose we're just two dads out on the road enjoying our lives and going, 'We're not coming home for Christmas. We'll send a postcard. It's not like we don't want to come home for Christmas. We would like nothing more but we have a lot of shit going on. When are you going to die? Do you have a deadline before your death? I guarantee it before then. Five years, ten years? It took us seven years to write the [first] film, so you do the math. That was a sad thing to say." Rhys Darby added that there had been no further movement on the project in 2020.

In 2022, Waititi added that he, Clement and Rhys "... haven’t written it, but we still want to do it. That’d be the only spinoff, the only thing to do with What We Do In The Shadows that I would do again."

Waititi confirmed in June 2026 that writing had begun on the film, and estimated the script would be ready in 2027.

== Short films ==
In 2005, Waititi and Clement wrote and directed a short film titled What We Do in the Shadows: Interviews with Some Vampires, which was a precursor to the feature-length film. The short stars Jonny Brugh, Cori Gonzalez-Macuer and Stu Rutherford in their roles of Deacon, Nick and Stu respectively.

In June 2014, Waititi, in conjunction with Discover New Zealand, produced a promotional short film titled Vampire's Guide to Vellington, in which he reprises his role as Viago von Blitzenberg.

== Television spin-offs ==
=== Wellington Paranormal ===
Waititi and Clement revealed plans in September 2016 for Wellington Paranormal, a procedural comedy series based on officers O'Leary and Minogue, minor characters in the film. Series producers granted Waititi and Clement $1 million to produce six 30-minute episodes for the series, which first aired on TVNZ 2 on 11 July 2018. The character Nick from the film also appeared in the episode "A Normal Night". A fourth and final series aired in 2022.

=== What We Do in the Shadows ===
An American television series was developed from the film. A pilot was ordered by FX, which featured Kayvan Novak, Matt Berry, Natasia Demetriou, Harvey Guillén and Mark Proksch. Executive producers of the show include Clement, Waititi, Scott Rudin, Paul Simms, Garrett Basch, and Eli Bush. On 3 May 2018, FX picked up the Waititi-directed pilot, with an order of ten 30-minute episodes which premiered on 27 March 2019. In May 2019, FX renewed the series for a 10-episode second season that debuted in 2020. In May 2020, FX announced that they have renewed the series for a third season. The show's audience grew by 25 percent from season 1 to season 2, with average viewing at about 3.2 million. A sixth and final season aired in 2024.
