= Toi Whakaari =

Drama school in Wellington, New Zealand

Coordinates: 41.308°S 174.775°E

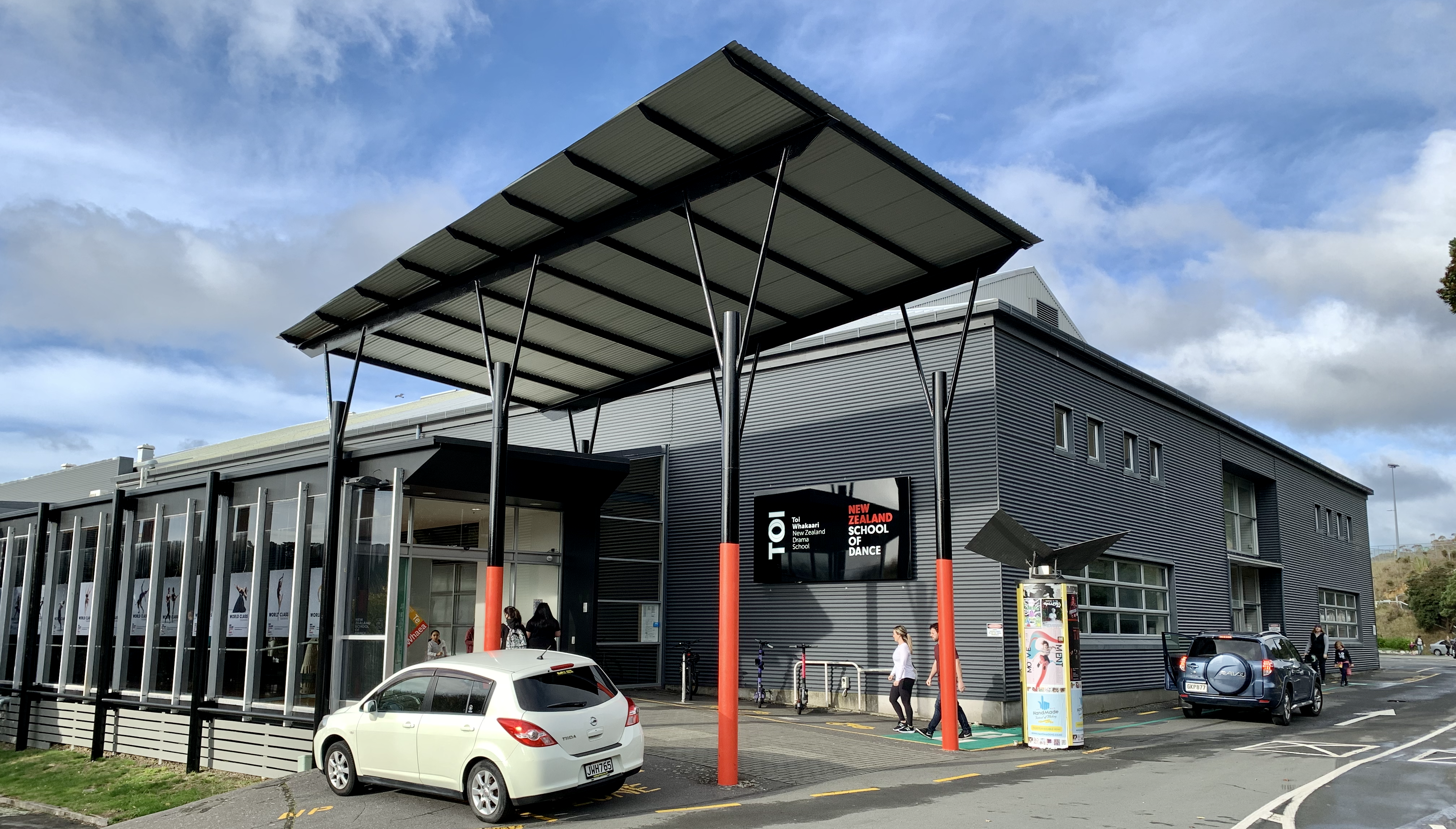
Entrance to Toi Whakaari and Te Whaea: The National Dance and Drama Centre

Toi Whakaari: NZ Drama School is New Zealand's national drama school. It was established in 1970 and is located in Wellington, New Zealand, in the Te Whaea: National Dance & Drama Centre. Toi Whakaari offers training in acting, costume construction, set and props construction, performing arts management and design for stage and screen. Toi Whakaari has a roll of approximately 130 students annually, who study for up to three years.

Toi Whakaari is co-located at Te Whaea: National School of Dance and Drama Centre with the New Zealand School of Dance which moved into the premises in 1998, at the same time as Toi Whakaari.

== Name ==
Te Kura Toi Whakaari O Aotearoa: NZ Drama School is the official name of the school. The Māori portion of the name translates to "a place of learning (Te Kura), performing arts (Toi Whakaari), in (O) New Zealand (Aotearoa)". This title was gifted to the School in 1988 by Te Puni Kōkiri (Ministry for Māori Development) in recognition of the School's bicultural work.

== History ==
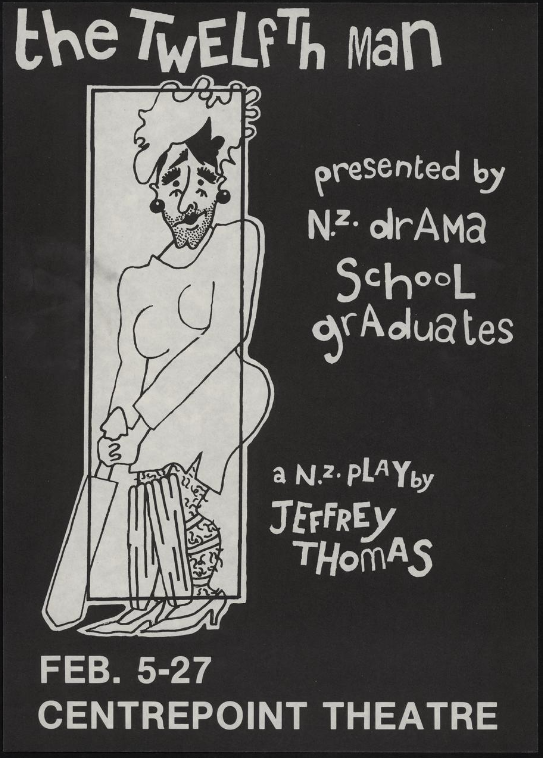
'The Twelfth Man' poster at Centrepoint Theatre (1983). This was the graduate production 1982

Toi Whakaari was established in 1970 by the Queen Elizabeth II Arts Council, as the New Zealand Drama School, with Nola Leigh Millar as its first director.

In 2005, its first year students were the subjects of a reality TV show, Tough Act. 2010 saw Toi Whakaari celebrate its 40th anniversary. This also coincided with a book launch of the school's history. The book, titled Transitions, was written by Bill Guest, former Head of the Entertainment Technology Programme and Associate Director.

Annie Ruth, one of the first acting graduates of the school, was Director of the school from 1998–2011 when she was succeeded by Christian Penny, who left in 2018 to take up a role with High Performance Sport NZ. In June 2019 it was announced that Tanea Heke (Ngā Puhi) would be the new Director, after six months as interim Director.

The school had a number of ongoing sexual and emotional abuse allegations reported in 2021.

== Notable alumni ==
- James Ashcroft - director, actor, writer, producer
- Hori Ahipene – Actor, director, playwright in New Zealand
- Tim Balme — actor, writer
- Nancy Brunning - actor, director, writer
- Alice Canton— actor, director
- Cliff Curtis - actor
- Marton Csokas — screen actor
- Kerry Fox - actor
- Miranda Harcourt — actor, director, coach
- Tanea Heke — actor, director, Kaiwhakahaere
- Rachel House -actor, writer, director
- Ahi Karunaharan — writer, director, actor
- Francis Kora — musician, actor
- Laughton Kora — musician, actor
- Robyn Malcolm – New Zealand actress
- Rawiri Paratene – New Zealand actor and filmmaker
- Chris Parker - comedian
- Emily Perkins — novelist, playwright
- Maaka Pohatu — actor, musician
- Chelsie Preston Crayford — actor, filmmaker
- Neill Rea – New Zealand actor and casting director
- Sophie Roberts - director of Silo Theatre
- Victor Roger — actor, playwright
- Louise Sutherland — filmmaker
- Alex Tarrant — screen actor
- Rangimoana Taylor – New Zealand theatre director, actor and storyteller
- Leon Wadham — screen actor
