= Pop-up Globe =

Theatre production company in New Zealand

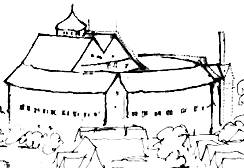
The second Globe Theatre, London, as drawn by Wencelas Hollar in the 1630s

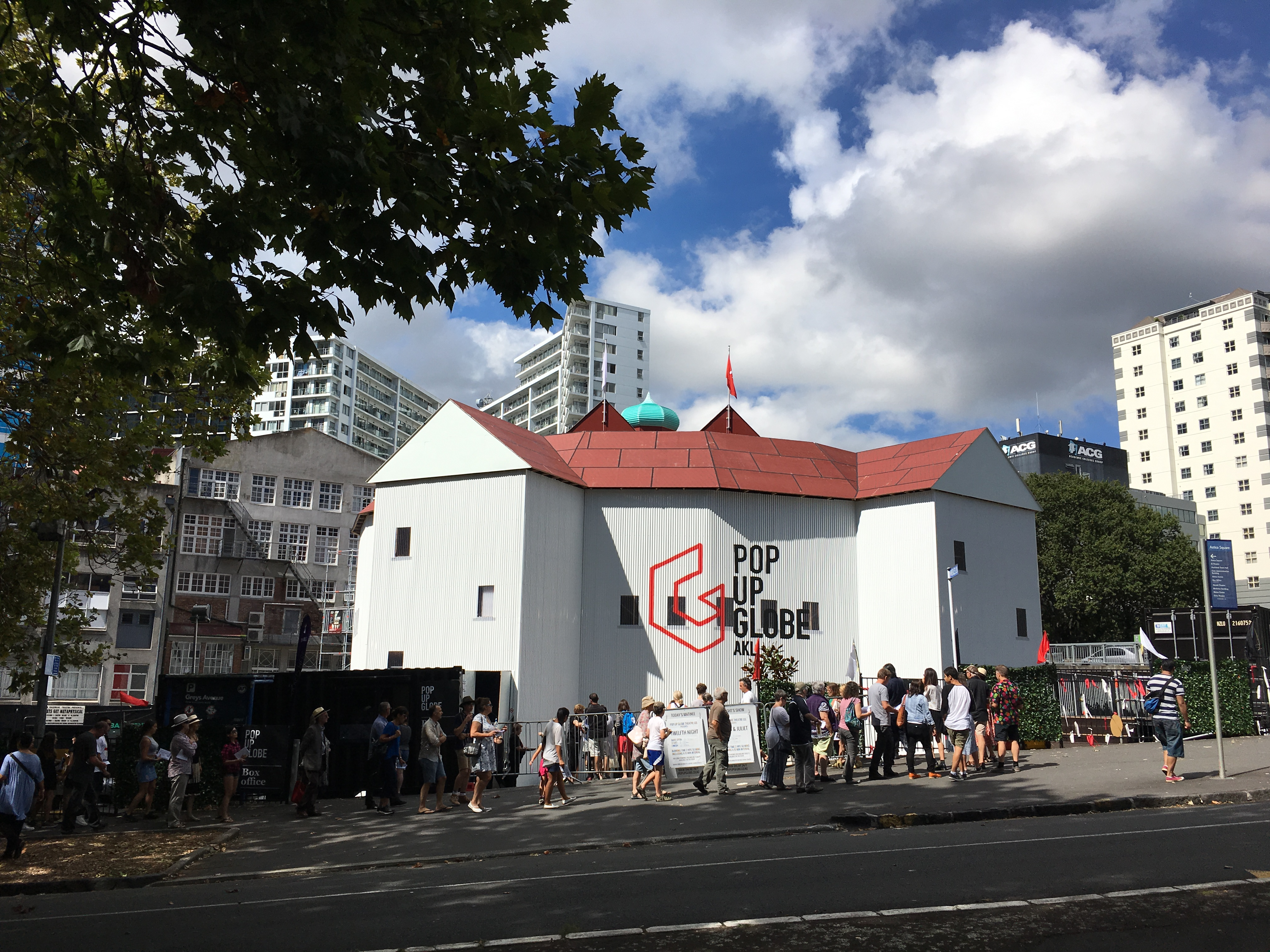
Pop-up Globe, Auckland CBD 2016

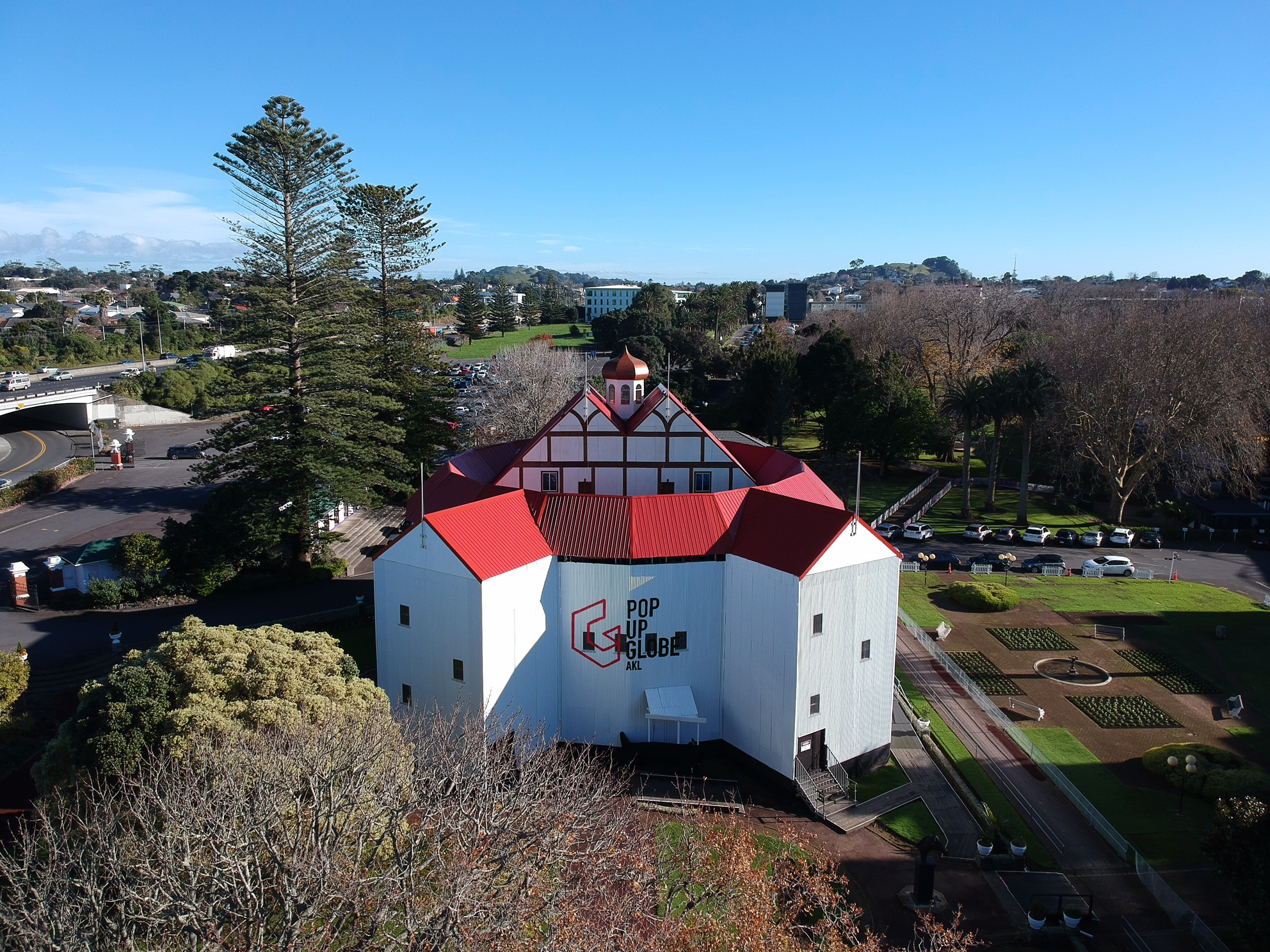
Aerial view of Pop-up Globe at Ellerslie Racecourse, Winter 2017

Pop-up Globe was a New Zealand theatre production company, based in Auckland, New Zealand. It produced Jacobean theatre, particularly the works of Shakespeare, in specially-built temporary replicas of the second Globe, the theatre Shakespeare and his company built and used. The company's theatre was the world's first full-scale reconstruction of the Second Globe Theatre (1614–44).

Between 2015 and 2020, Pop-up Globe attracted audiences of approximately 748,000 people to predominantly Shakespeare productions across New Zealand and Australia, constructing five temporary Pop-up Globe playhouses in four cities.

The company constructed the first Pop-up Globe in Auckland CBD, next to the Auckland Town Hall, from February–May 2016; Pop-up Globe's second season ran from 23 February to 17 May 2017 in a newly designed and constructed Pop-up Globe at Ellerslie Racecourse in Auckland.

Pop-up Globe's first international season, promoted by Live Nation Entertainment, ran from 21 September to 3 February 2018 in an area of Kings Domain adjacent to the Sidney Myer Music Bowl in Melbourne, Australia, which was temporarily called the Shakespeare Gardens.

The company ceased all performances in March 2020 as a result of the COVID-19 pandemic. A year later, in March 2021, with no foreseeable prospect of further international touring, the Pop-up Globe group of companies was put into liquidation.

The company performed in Auckland at the SkyCity Theatre and Q Theatre in late 2023 and early 2024.

== Background ==
Pop-up Globe was founded in 2015 by Artistic Director Dr Miles Gregory. Co-founder Tobias Grant joined the project at a very early stage. Both are native Aucklanders. Gregory had worked for 18 years in the UK as a director and producer, and Grant had a background in media and marketing.

The first season, featuring the Pop-up Globe Theatre Company performing Twelfth Night and Romeo and Juliet, with independent visiting productions of Titus Andronicus, The Tempest, Much Ado About Nothing, Henry V, Antony and Cleopatra and Hamlet, opened on 18 February 2016, as part of the commemorations of the quatercentenary of Shakespeare's death. Over 100,000 tickets were sold during a 12-week season, making it the largest Shakespeare festival in the Southern Hemisphere.

The second season featured two in-house repertory acting companies, Queen's and King's, performing Much Ado About Nothing/Othello and As You Like It/Henry V respectively. Over 100,000 tickets were sold in the second season.

== Theatre ==
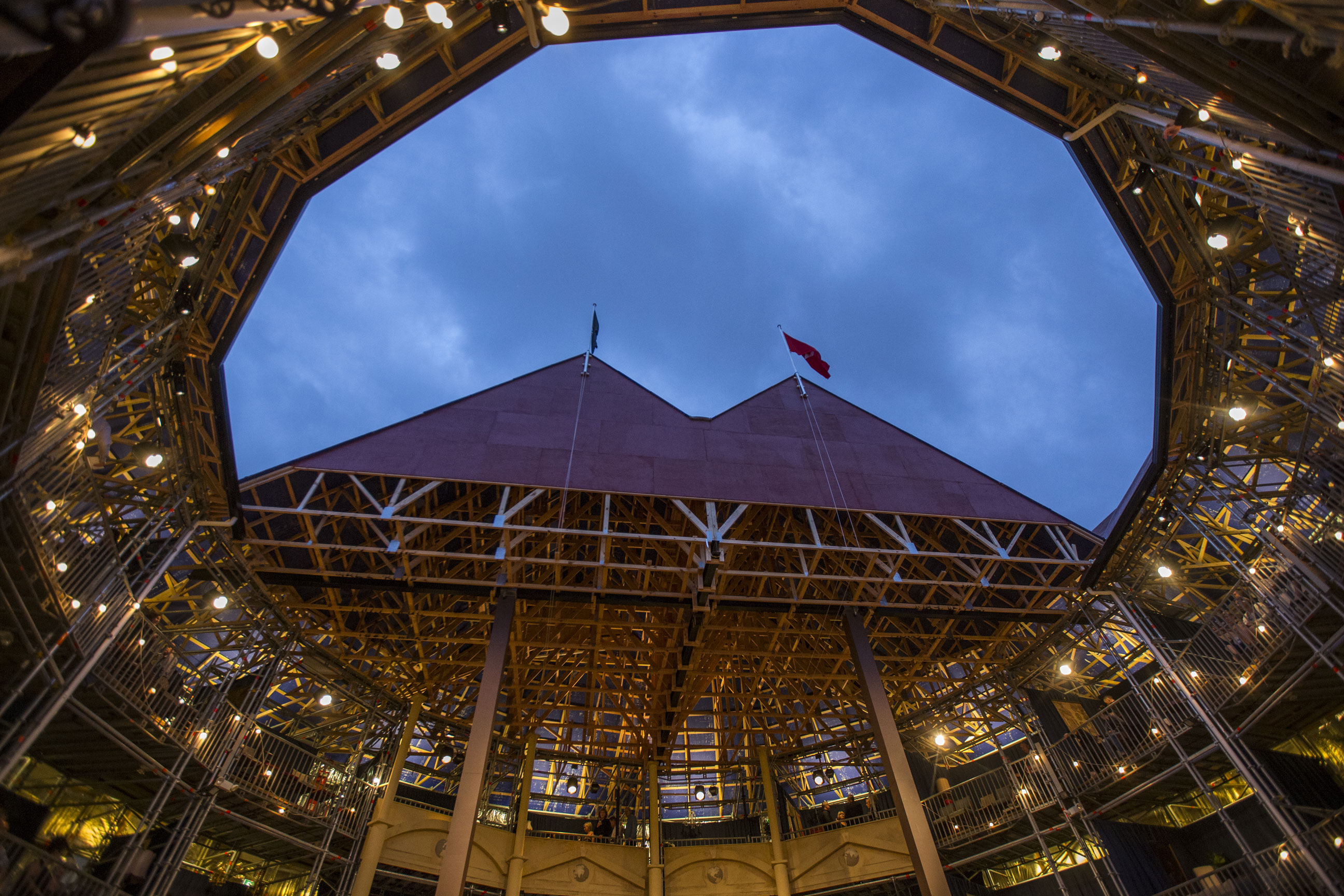
Interior photograph of Pop-up Globe 2016, showing galleries and stage roof

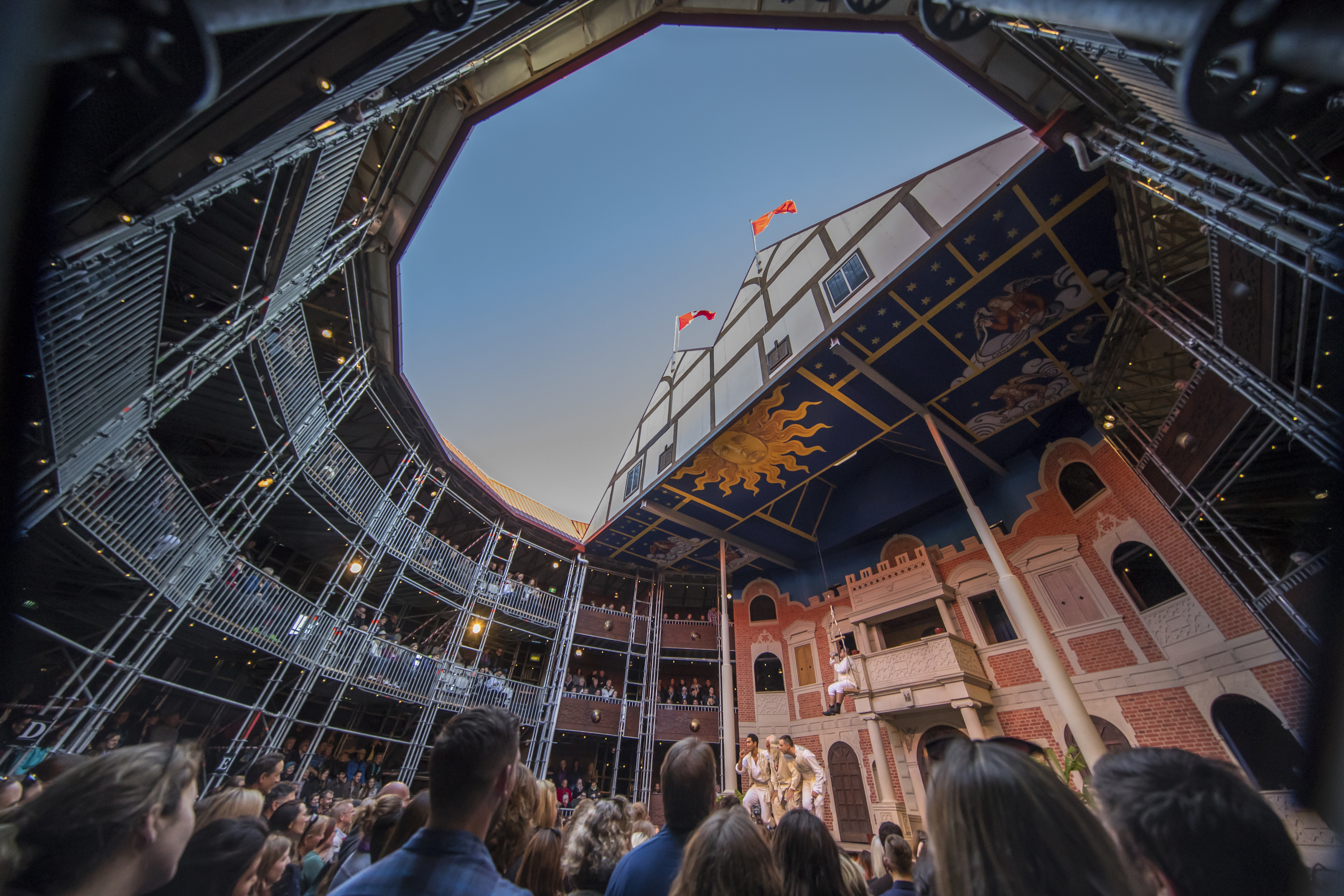
Performance of Much Ado About Nothing by the Pop-up Globe Queen's Company at Pop-up Globe Auckland, May 2017

The theatre's architectural plan is based on the published research of Professor Tim Fitzpatrick of Sydney University.

Fitzpatrick's reconstruction synthesised a mathematical projection based on Wenceslaus Hollar's Long View of London from Bankside sketch of London's skyline in the early 1640s with extensive research into the Jacobean ad quadratum technique of architectural planning, and with the results of the limited archaeological evidence available from the site of the original Globe.

Based on this, Pop-up Globe's design was a 16-sided polygon, 88 feet (27 m) in external diameter. This was some 12 feet (3.7 m) smaller than Shakespeare's Globe in London, which some scholars and theatre practitioners had judged to be too large. As a consequence of this smaller diameter, the 'yard' where audiences stand was around 40% smaller than the yard at Shakespeare's Globe.

Pop-up Globe was 56 feet (17 m) high, with a standing capacity of 300 'groundlings' and 600 seats in three galleries. It was topped by a distinctive 'onion dome', visible in the Hollar sketch.

The interior design of the stage (43 feet (13 m) in width, as specified in the contract for the Fortune Playhouse) changed significantly between the first and second seasons. The first season employed a canted scaenae frons across four audience bays at the rear of the stage, with four doors in a neo-classical design. The audience was seated in 360°, with "Lord's" and "Gentlemen's" rooms in the middle and upper galleries behind the stage. Based on practical learnings from the first season, the 2017 season featured a flat scaenae frons with three doors in a baroque design, with the audience seated around 270°, with a balcony above the central door, and a musician's gallery above the balcony.

== Style of presentation ==
The foundation of performance at Pop-up Globe is the relationship between actors and audience. Direct address is the central feature of the way Shakespeare is played at Pop-up Globe, although some productions have varied the degree to which they embrace direct address as a tool. Allowances are made for what the artistic vision calls 'judicious ad-libs' as often the conditions of performance at Pop-up Globe—weather, planes flying overhead, unexpectedly boisterous audience members—mean that no two performances are the same and actors have to acknowledge the environment around them. Pop-up Globe productions make huge use of live original music and dance, and all productions have ended with a jig danced by the company, For the first three seasons of Pop-up Globe one company was a dedicated 'Jacobean' company, wearing 17th century dress and exploring original conditions of performance to various degrees, while the other company was 'eclectic' and not bound by any early modern conventions.

== Actors ==
Pop-up Globe's productions have featured international casts, with approximately 20% of each company coming from outside of New Zealand. Pop-up Globe's companies have included actors from the UK, the US and Australia working alongside local actors. With the exception of the Admiral's Company (Around the Globe in 60 Minutes), the Pembroke's Company (Julius Caesar) and the Irihapeti Company (Emilia), Pop-up Globe actors always work as a repertory company, with actors playing contrasting roles in two different productions: for example, in the 2017 season Chris Huntly-Turner doubled the title role in Henry V with Le Beau in As You Like It. Sometimes doubling is about practicality of rehearsal, (such as the actors playing Othello, Iago and Cassio in Othello doubling as Don John, Conrade and Borachio in Much Ado About Nothing in 2017) sometimes doubling is about a balanced workload (such as Adrian Hooke alternating the title role in Hamlet with the much smaller role of Claudio in Measure For Measure in 2019), and sometimes the doubling is intended to illuminate recurrent tropes in the plays (such as Stephen Lovatt and Jess Hong playing father and daughter in both Romeo and Juliet and Much Ado About Nothing in the 2019/2020 season).

== Performance History ==
=== Season One (February - May 2016) ===
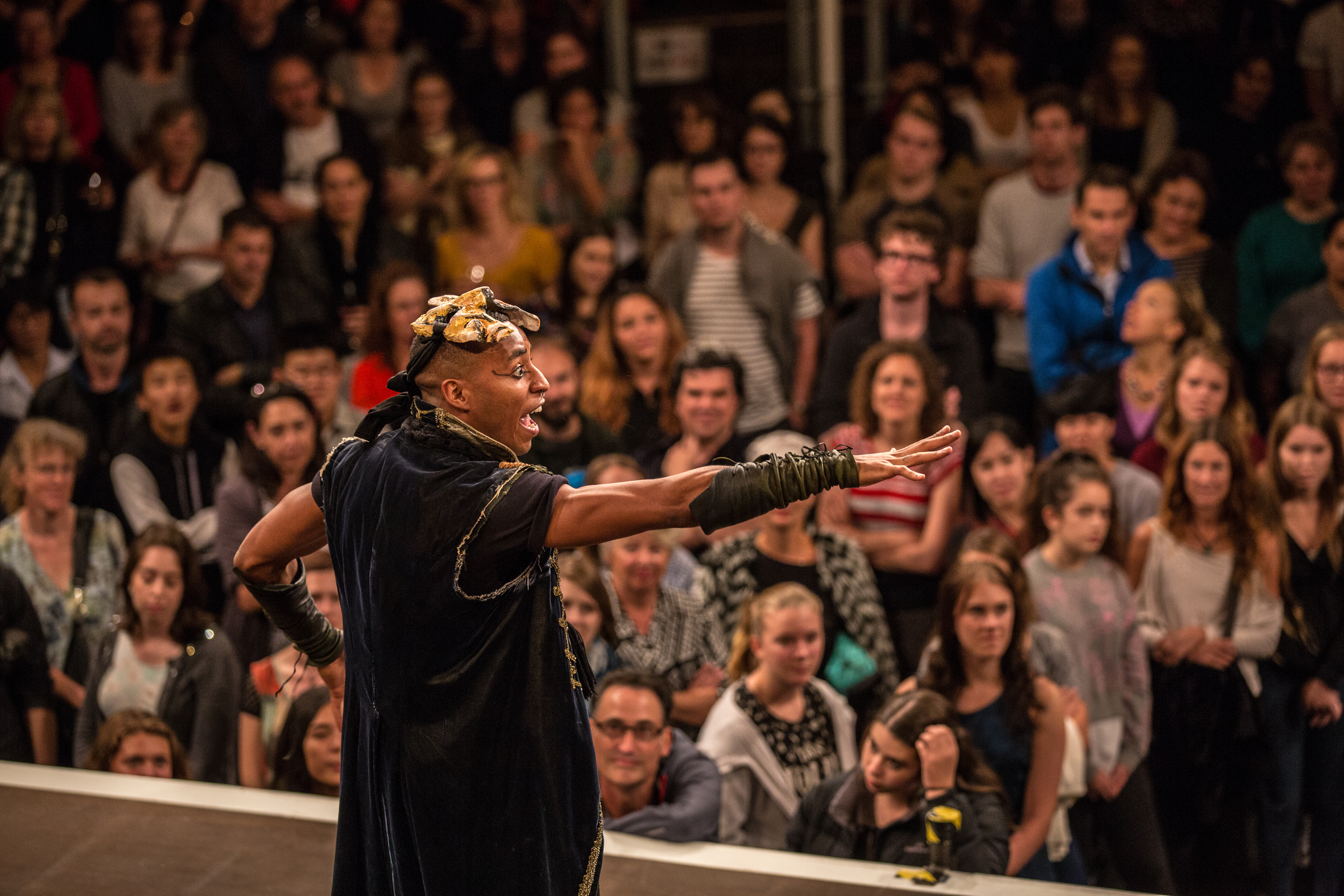
Stanley Andrew Jackson III as Mercutio in Romeo and Juliet

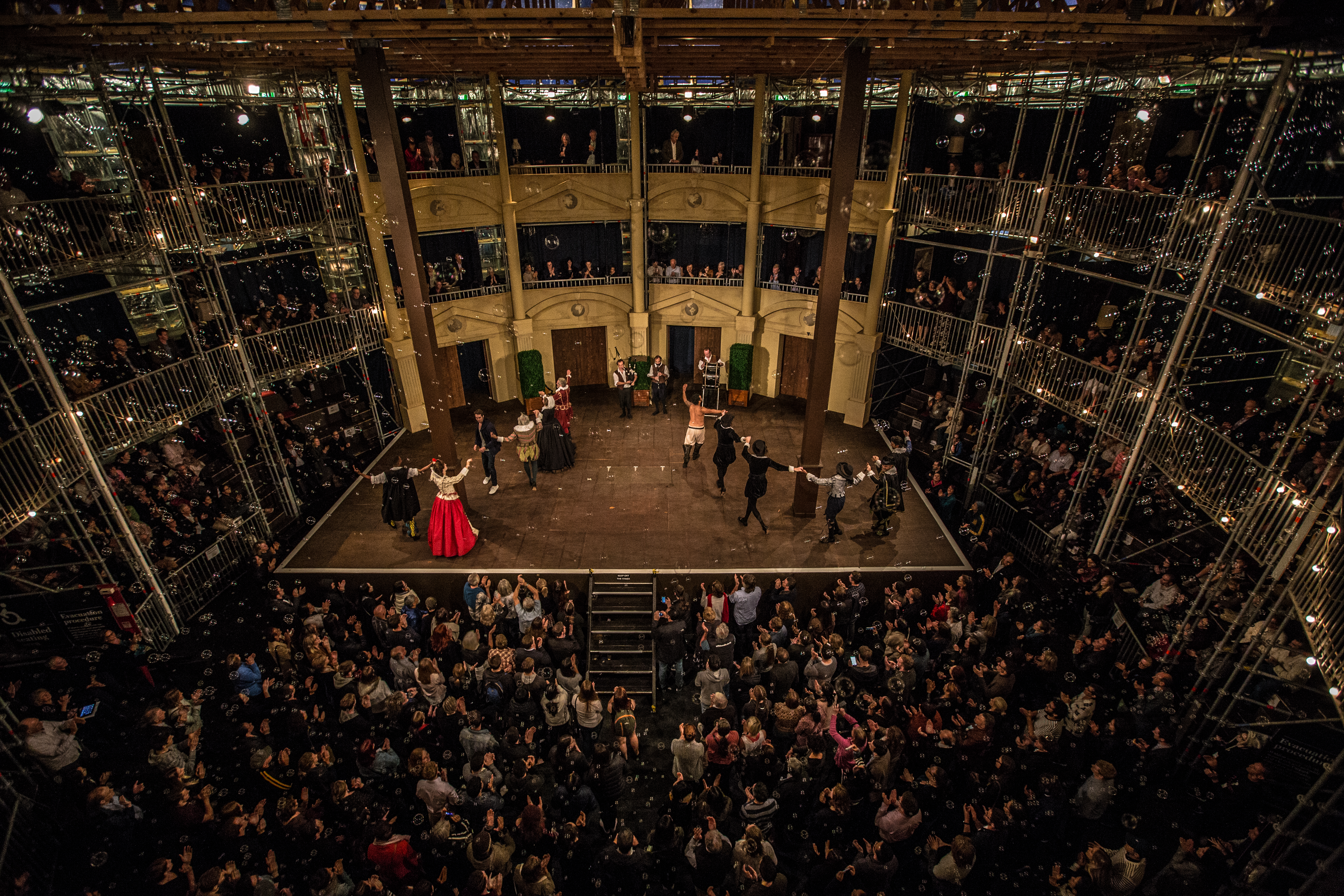
View of the playhouse from the back of the upper gallery during Twelfth Night in 2016.

Rehearsals began in Auckland on 5 January 2016, the same day that construction of the playhouse commenced in the carpark beside the Basement Theatre and Q Theatre on Grey's Ave in central Auckland.

Pop-up Globe opened to the public on 16 February 2016, with the in-house Pop-up Globe Theatre Company performing Twelfth Night and Romeo and Juliet in repertory. Romeo and Juliet (directed by Ben Naylor) was performed in emblematic modern dress, with Jonathan Tynan-Moss and Christel Chapman playing the title roles; Twelfth Night (directed by Miles Gregory) was performed in Jacobean dress by an all-male cast including Daniel Watterson as Olivia, Aaron Richardson as Viola, Stanley Andrew Jackson III as Malvolio and Adrian Hooke as Feste.

The season was originally scheduled to close on Sunday 24 April, the day after the 400th anniversary of Shakespeare's death, but was extended until Sunday 7 May. Twelfth Night and Romeo and Juliet were performed a total of 97 times, a record-breaking run for Shakespeare in New Zealand.

Over the course of the season, the programme was supplemented with a range of enrichment activities including classes on stage, public talks, a book launch, and guided tours of the playhouse. Pop-up Globe also hosted a number of visiting productions for short engagements: the Auckland Summer Shakespeare presented 8 performances of The Tempest, Byrnes Productions presented eight performances of Antony and Cleopatra, the Young Auckland Shakespeare Company presented two performances of a reverse-gender Much Ado About Nothing, the Lord Lackbeards presented two performances of their all-female Hamlet, Fractious Tash presented four performances of Titus Andronicus, Grae Burton Productions presented four performances of an all-female Henry V and the Ugly Shakespeare Company gave three performances of their schools version of Othello. Loop Media presented a one-night concert, Play On, in which a collection of NZ musicians performed Shakespeare soliloquies set to music by Paul McLaney.

Approximately 102,000 people attended Pop-up Globe during the 2016 season. At that time this was the largest known attendance for a drama festival in New Zealand history.

=== Season Two (February – May 2017) ===
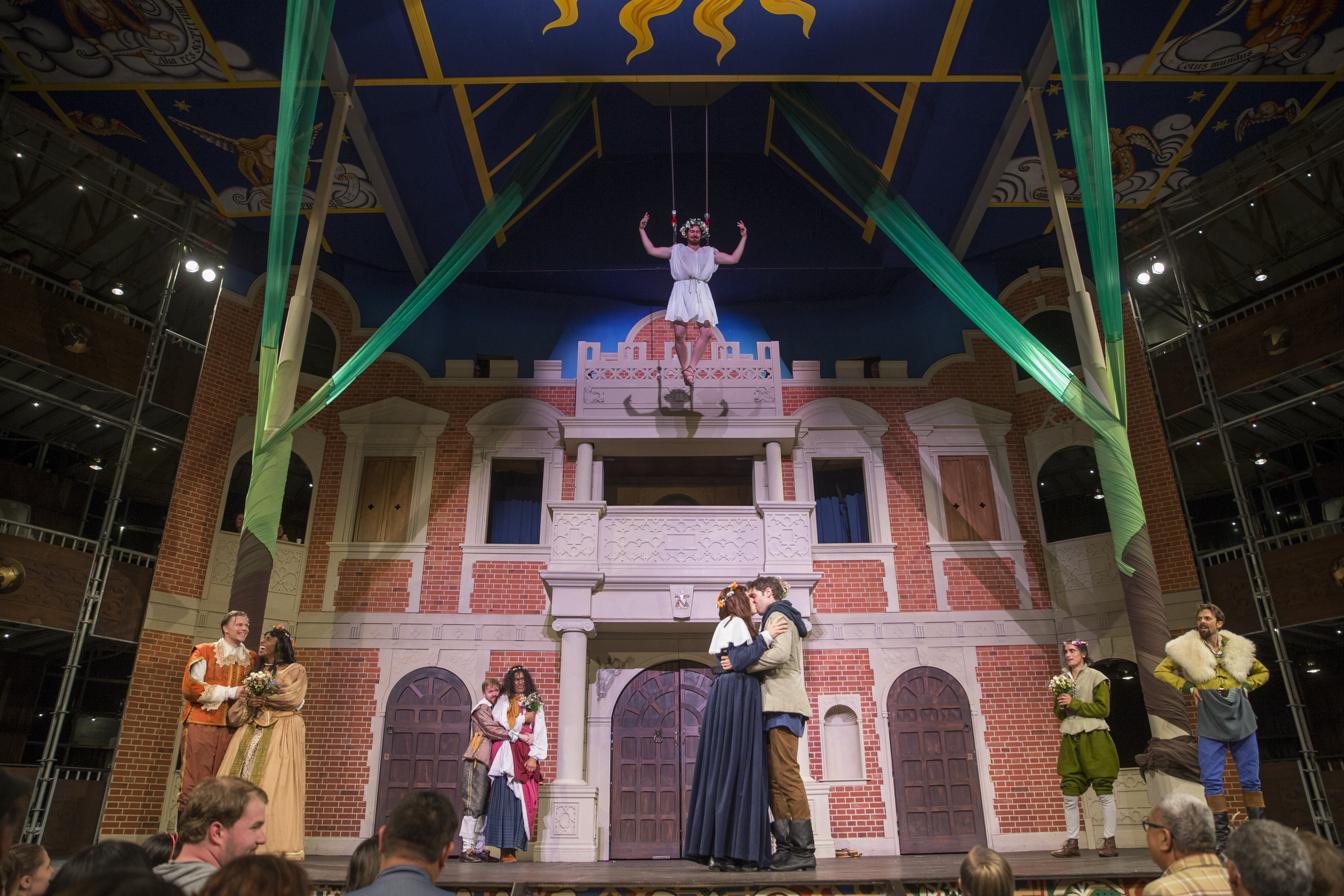
Hymen, god of marriage, descends from the heavens at the end of As You Like It (c) Pop-up Globe

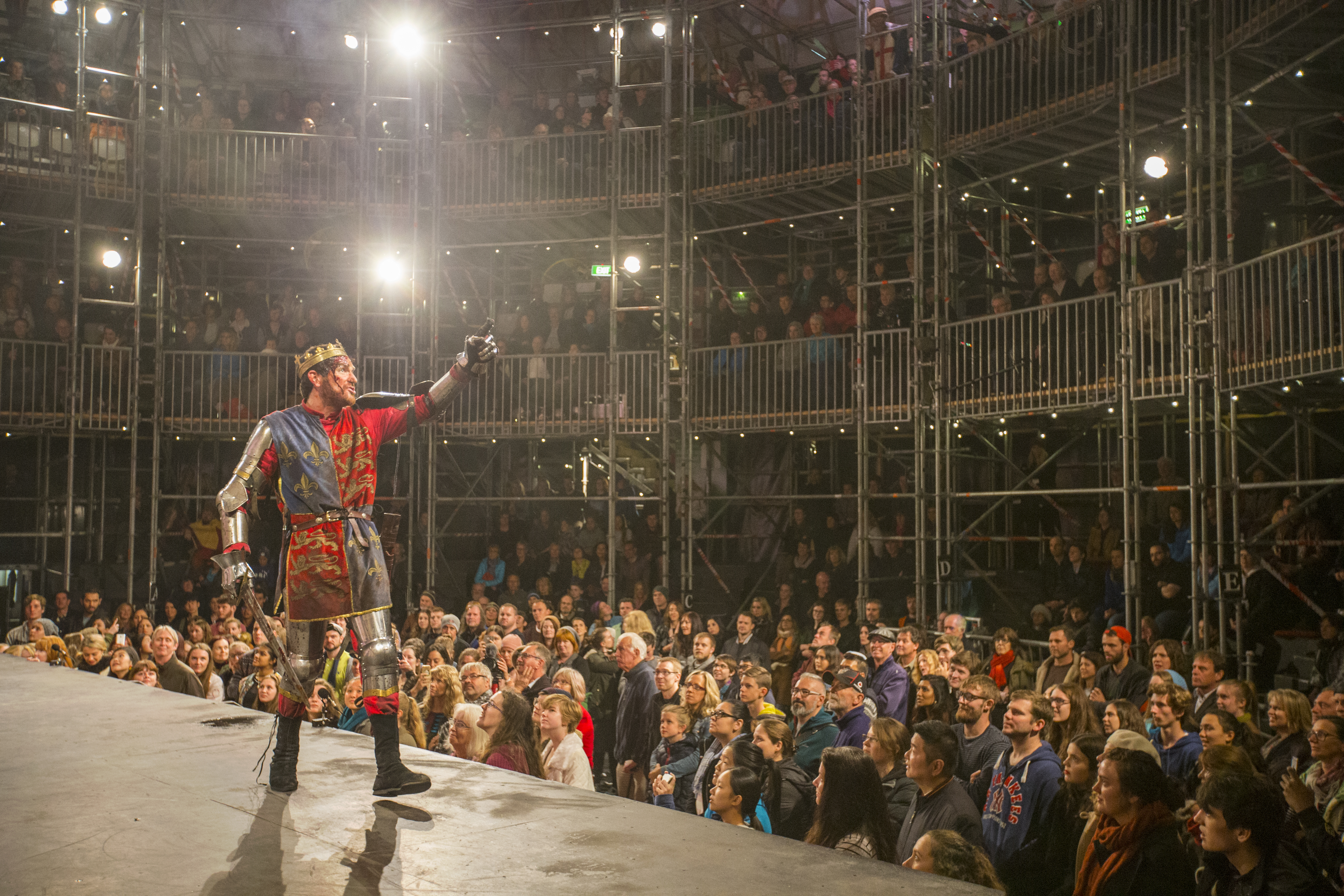
Chris Huntly-Turner as Henrv V (c) Pop-up Globe

After several months of working in secret on a new venue, Pop-up Globe announced in August 2016 that they would be mounting a second season in a new location for 2017. Over 1,200 actors from around the world applied to be part of the audition process that took place through October 2016, and in a media launch on October 25 Pop-up Globe revealed their new location – in the gardens at Auckland's oldest racing club, Ellerslie Racecourse – and the plays that would make up the season: Much Ado About Nothing, Othello, As You Like It and Henry V. This time, Pop-up Globe would have two in-house repertory companies meaning the theatre could open 7 days a week offering 2 performances a day, without reliance on outside productions to keep the doors open.

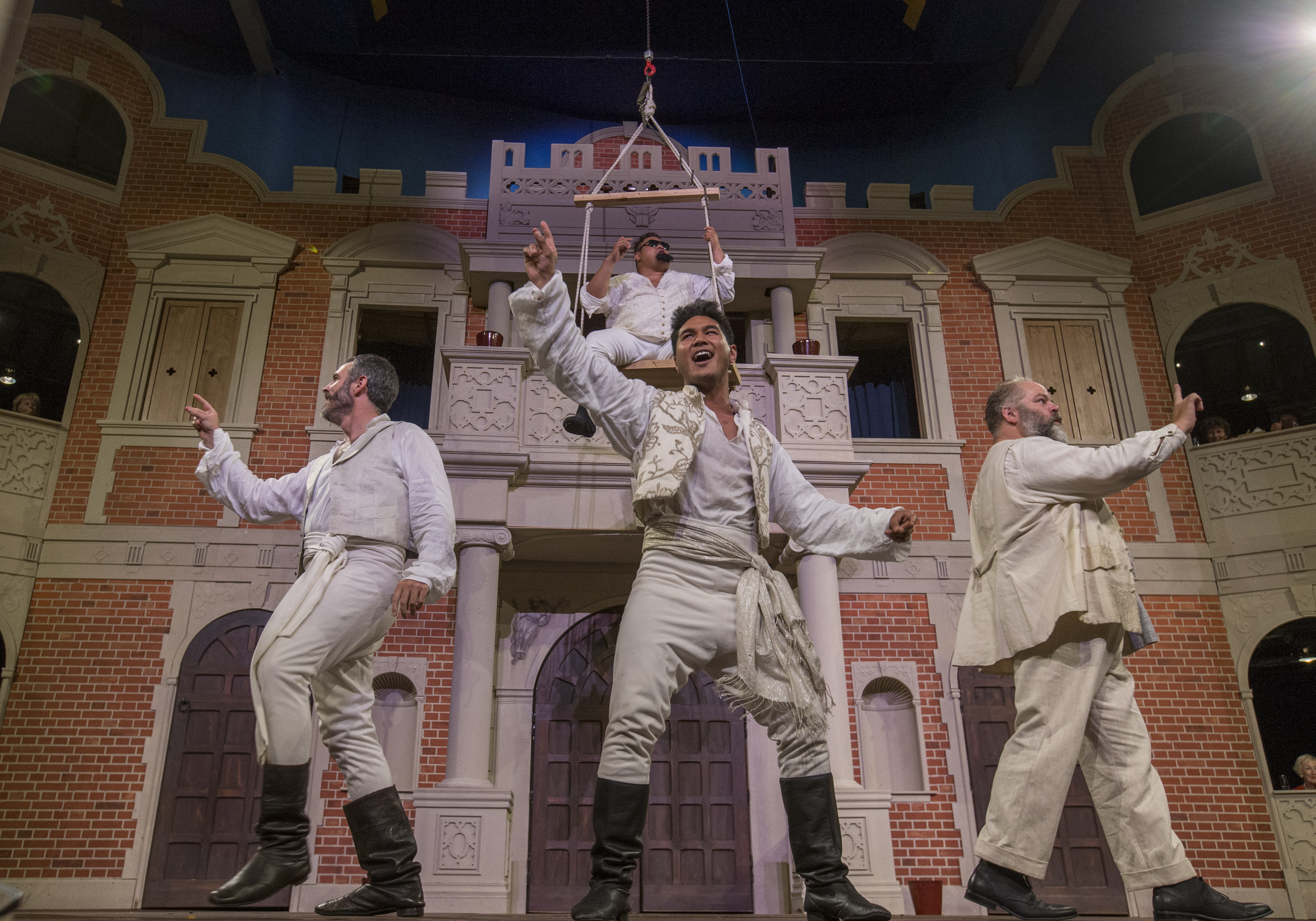
Keven Keys, Theo David, Semu Filipo and Phil Grieve in Much Ado About Nothing in 2017 (c)Pop-up Globe

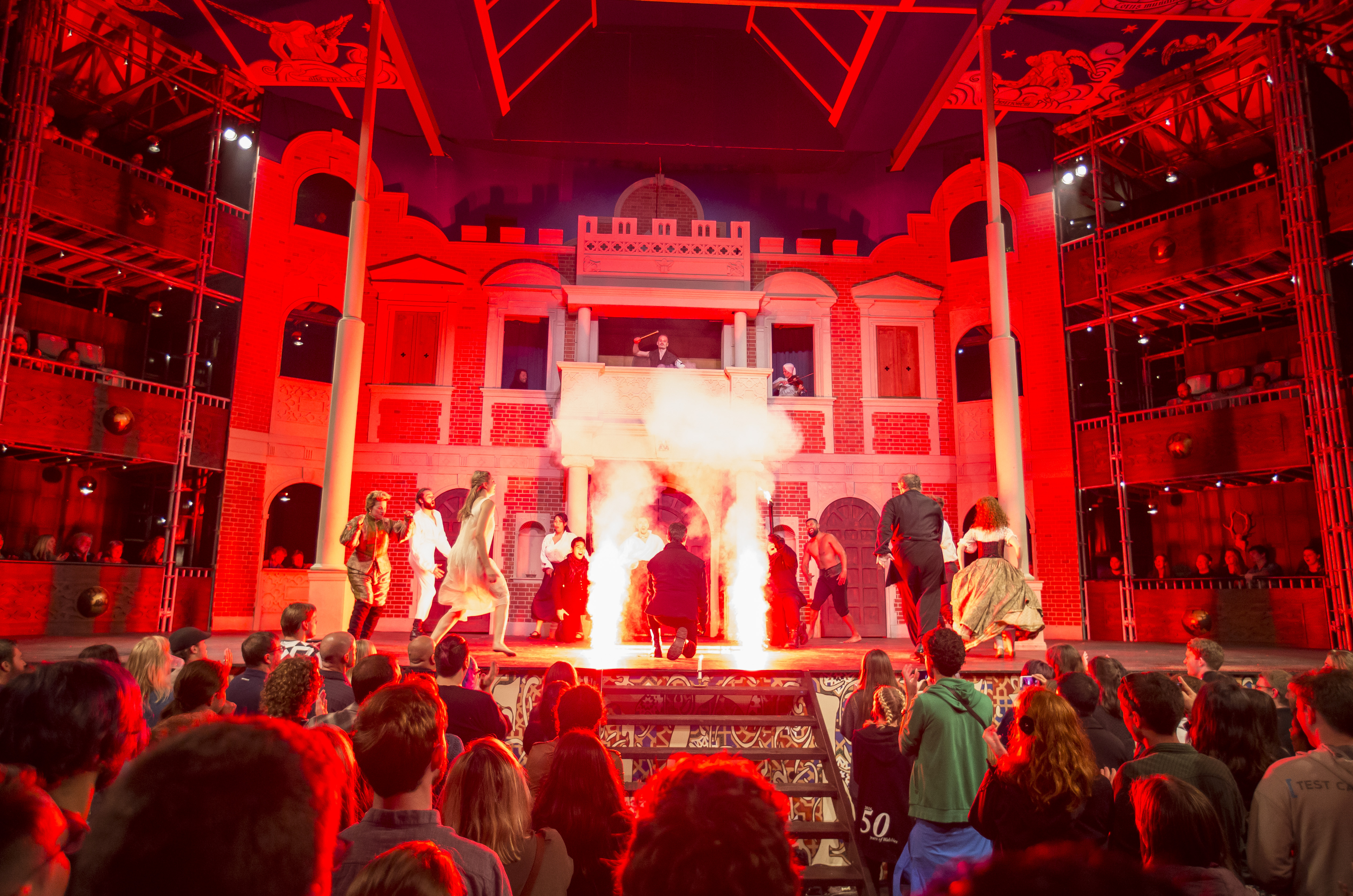
Fireworks during the jig at the end of Othello in 2017 (c)Pop-up Globe

Concrete foundations for the playhouse were laid in the racecourse gardens in December 2016 and construction began on the first day of rehearsals, Wednesday 4 January 2017. This completely redesigned version of the playhouse opened to the public on 23 February. The Queen's Company performed Much Ado About Nothing (directed by Miriama McDowell) and Othello (directed by Ben Naylor). The Pasifika-infused Much Ado About Nothing featured Semu Filipo and Jacque Drew as Benedick and Beatrice and was set on a banana plantation with Dogberry and Verges functioning as customs officers in charge of ensuring no illegal or dangerous produce entered the island. Othello starred Te Kohe Tuhaka in the title role and Haakon Smested played Iago as a literal manifestation of the devil who was hauled on a chain up into the ceiling by his feet at the end of the play and then re-arose from beneath the stage via a trapdoor, surrounding by fireworks, during the jig. The all-male King's Company performed As You Like It (directed by Tom Mallaburn) and Henry V (directed by Miles Gregory). As You Like It starred first season stalwarts Jonathan Tynan-Moss and Adrian Hooke as Rosalind and Orlando and Stanley Andrew Jackson III as Celia, in Jacobean dress with the court of Duke Frederick played as flamboyant Cavaliers opposite the more sober mild-mannered court of Duke Senior and his fellows in exile. Henry V starred Chris Huntly-Turner in the title role, with the company shifting from Jacobean dress in the court scenes to full medieval armour once in France. The production made use of scaling ladders, pyrotechnic-firing cannons, and flaming arrows were fired across the playhouse into the frons scenae during the siege of Harfleur. All four productions made use of pyrotechnics and mechanised flying technology installed in the playhouse ceiling, the 'heavens'.

The four productions gave a combined total of 162 performances over the season, with As You Like It and Much Ado About Nothing extending for an extra week past the official close of the season on Sunday 14 May. Pop-up Globe also hosted a fundraiser performance for NZ Actors' Equity to benefit the Actors' Benevolence Fund on Sunday 2 April and a concert by the Auckland Philharmonic Orchestra on Sunday 23 April featuring a selection of orchestral music based on Shakespeare's plays.

Approximately 103,000 people attended Pop-up Globe during the 2017 season.

=== Melbourne Transfer (September 2017 – February 2018) ===
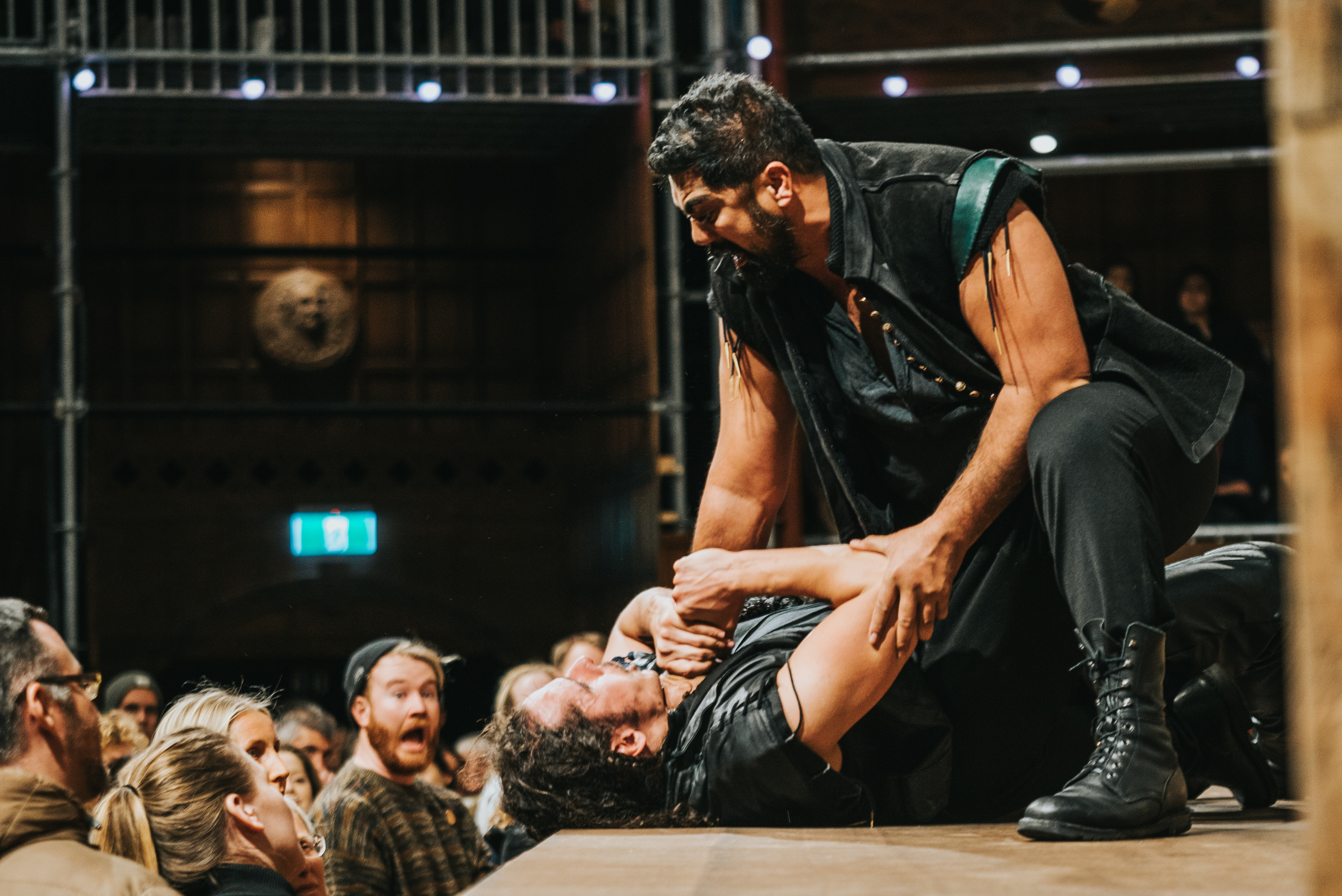
Regan Taylor and Haakon Smestad in Othello during the Melbourne transfer (c) Pop-up Globe

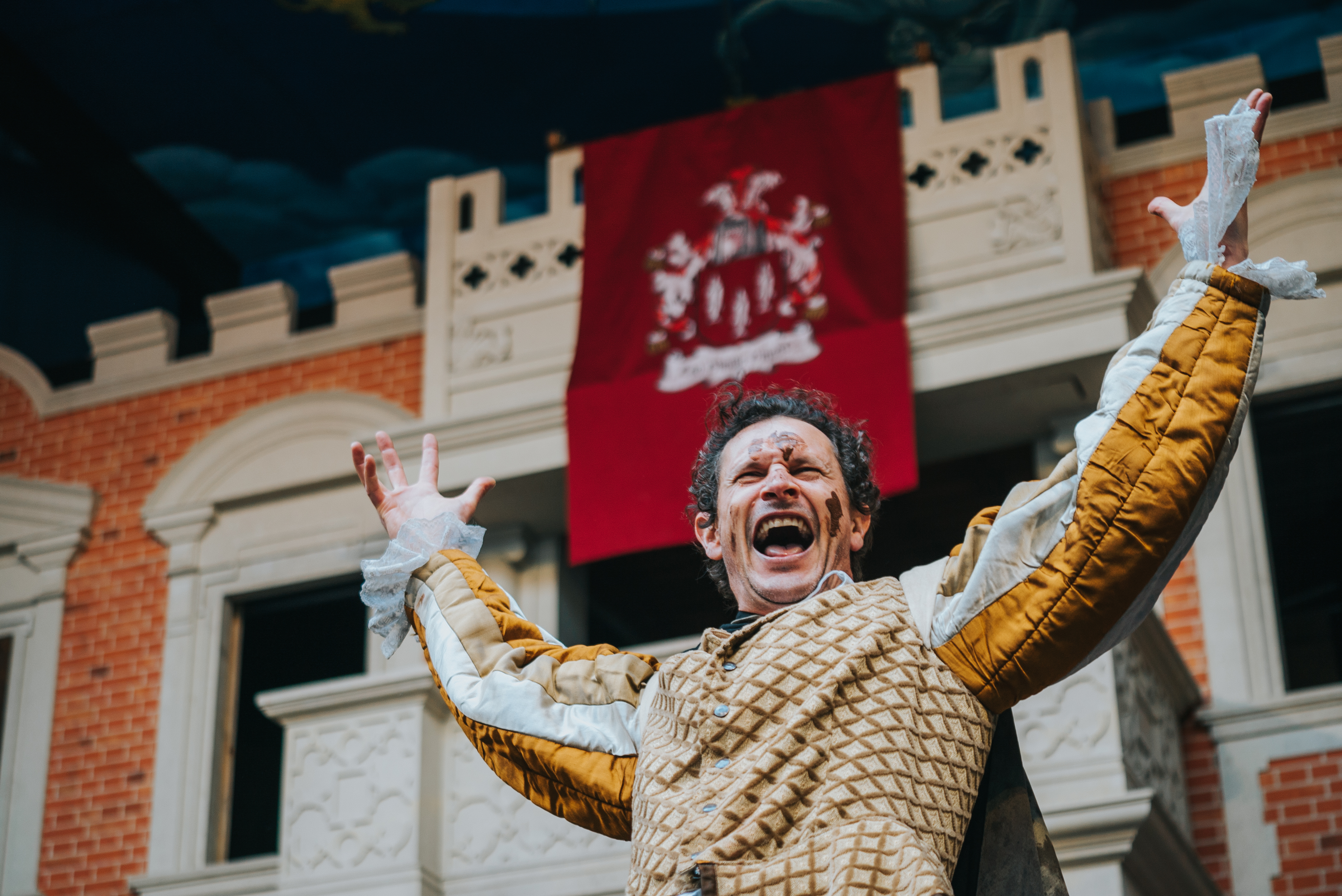
Hugh Sexton in Around The Globe In 60 Minutes! in Melbourne (c) Pop-up Globe

In a partnership with Live Nation, Pop-up Globe opened their first Australian transfer in Melbourne on 21 September 2017. The third iteration of Pop-up Globe was constructed at the back of the Sidney Myer Music Bowl in the King's Domain over August and September 2017, with much of the decorative interior including the frons scenae carefully dismantled anc shipped from the Ellerslie playhouse. With some cast changes, the transfer featured the Queen's Company's productions of Much Ado About Nothing and Othello, and the King's Company's productions of As You Like It and Henry V. Regan Taylor took over the title role in Othello and partway through the season Asalemo Tofete took over the role of Benedick in Much Ado About Nothing. The King's Company gave a special St Crispin's Day performance of Henry V on 25 October 2017.

The four NZ shows were joined in repertory by a new production, Around The Globe In 60 Minutes, featuring an Australian cast and written especially for the playhouse by Tom Mallaburn and directed by John Walton. Around The Globe In 60 Minutes was an all-ages show designed to introduce younger audiences to the world in which Shakespeare wrote his plays with a fictional plot centred on William Davenant's attempt to re-open the Globe Theatre during the English Civil War.

The five productions played for a cumulative 299 performances before Pop-up Globe Melbourne finally closed on Sunday 12 February 2018. Approximately 150,000 people attended a performance at Pop-up Globe Melbourne.

=== Season Three (December 2017 – May 2018) ===
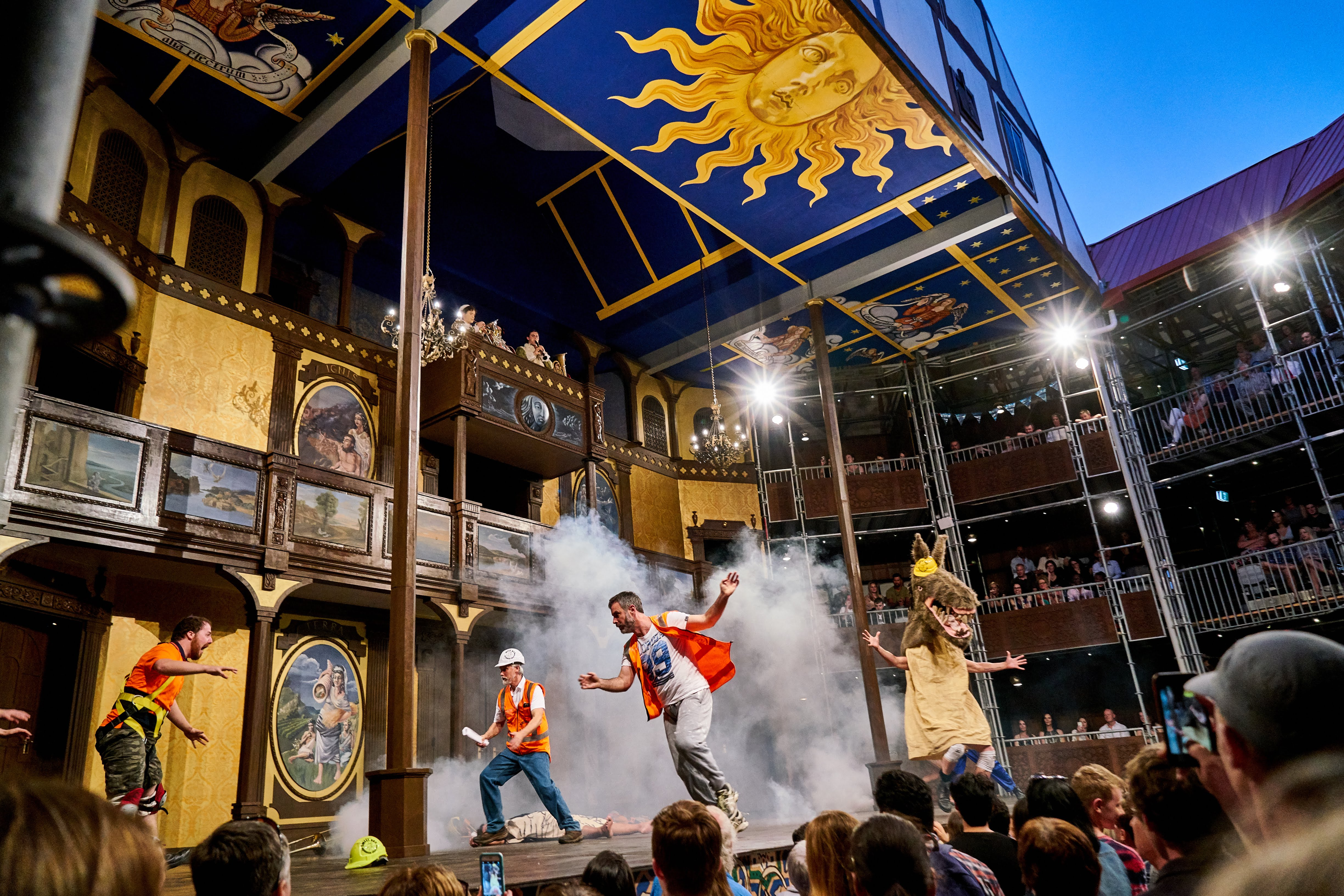
A Midsummer Night's Dream at Pop-up Globe in December 2017.

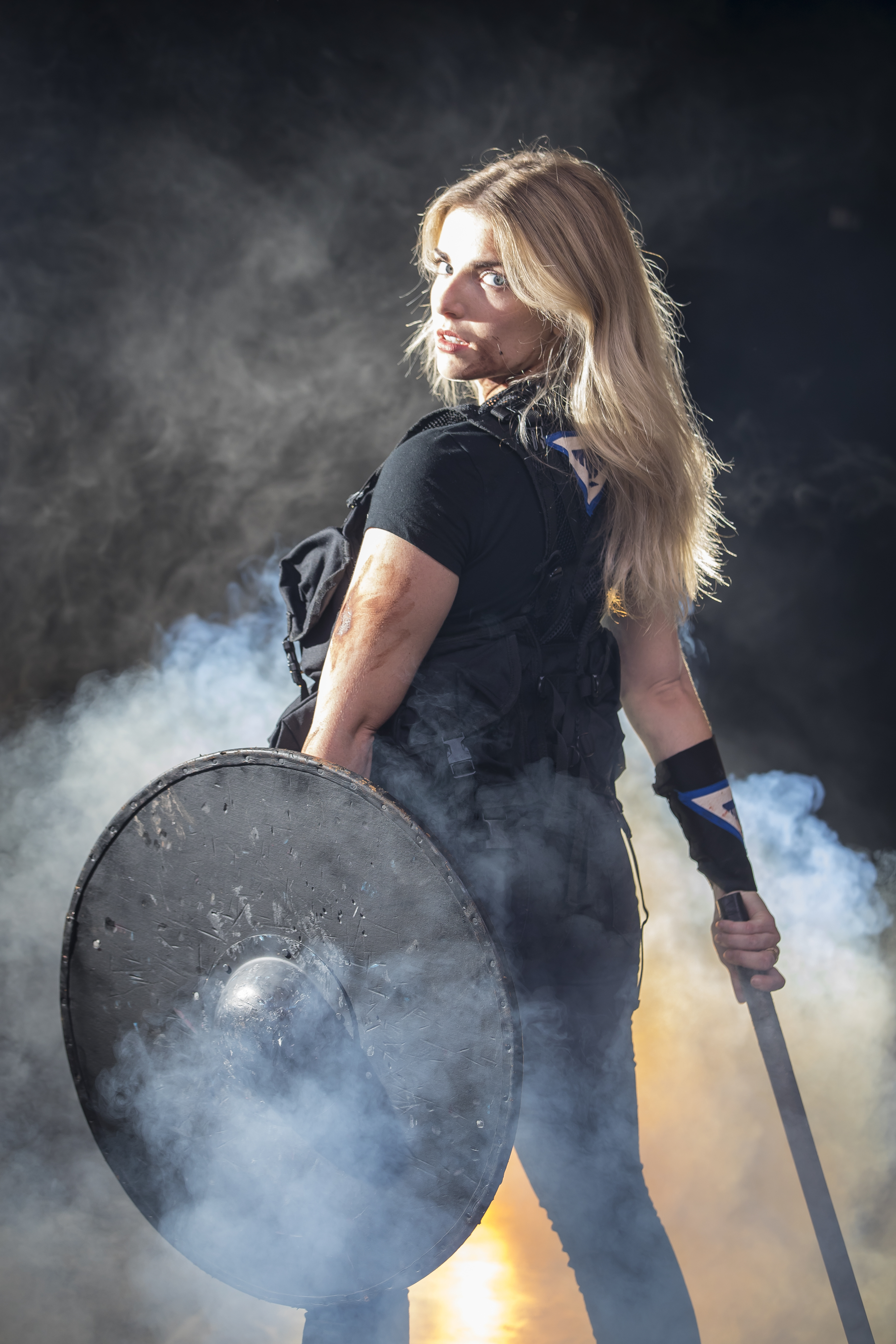
Jessie Lawrence as Mark Antony in Pop-up Globe's reverse-gender Julius Caesar.

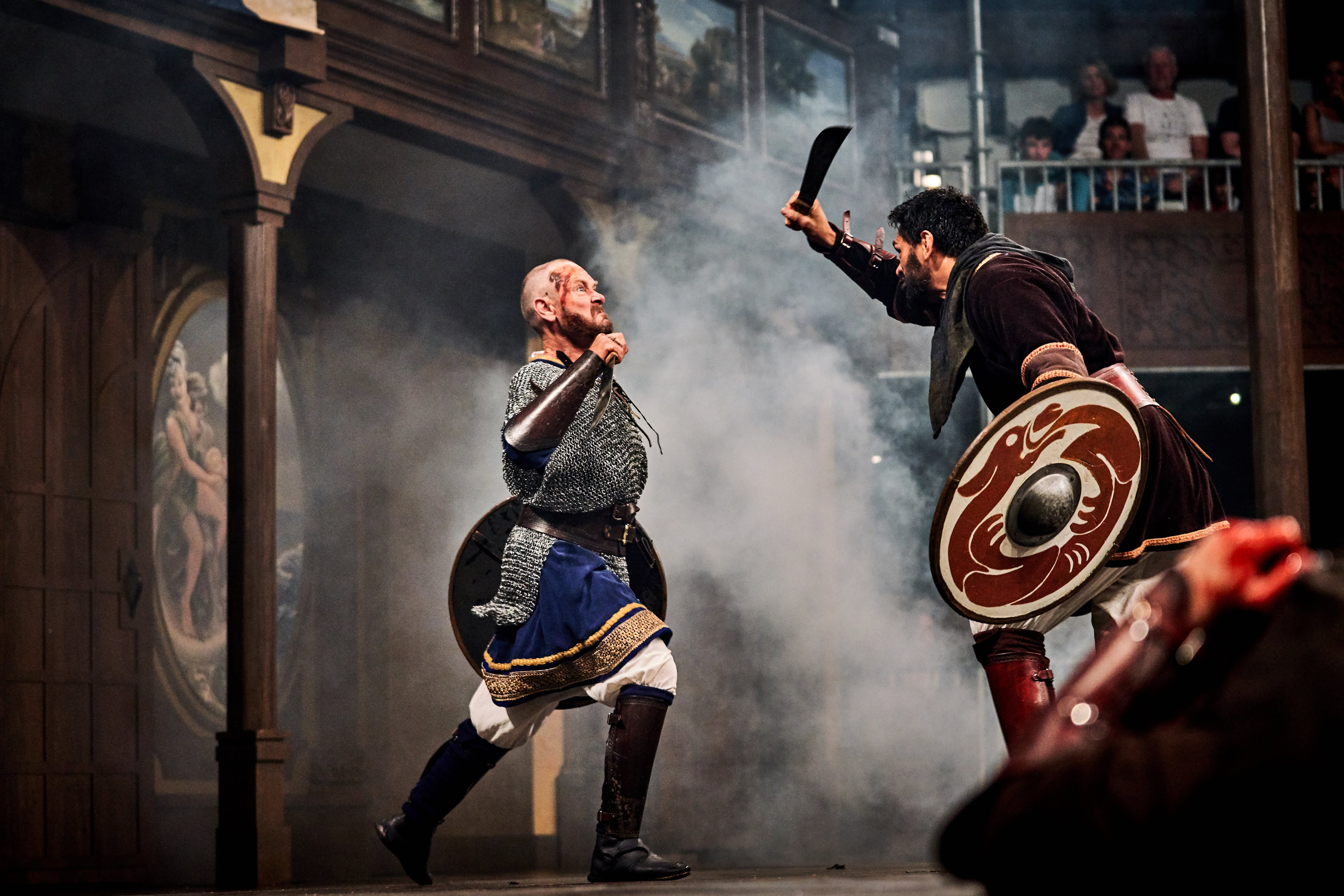
Stephen Lovatt as Macbeth and Matu Ngaropo as Macduff.

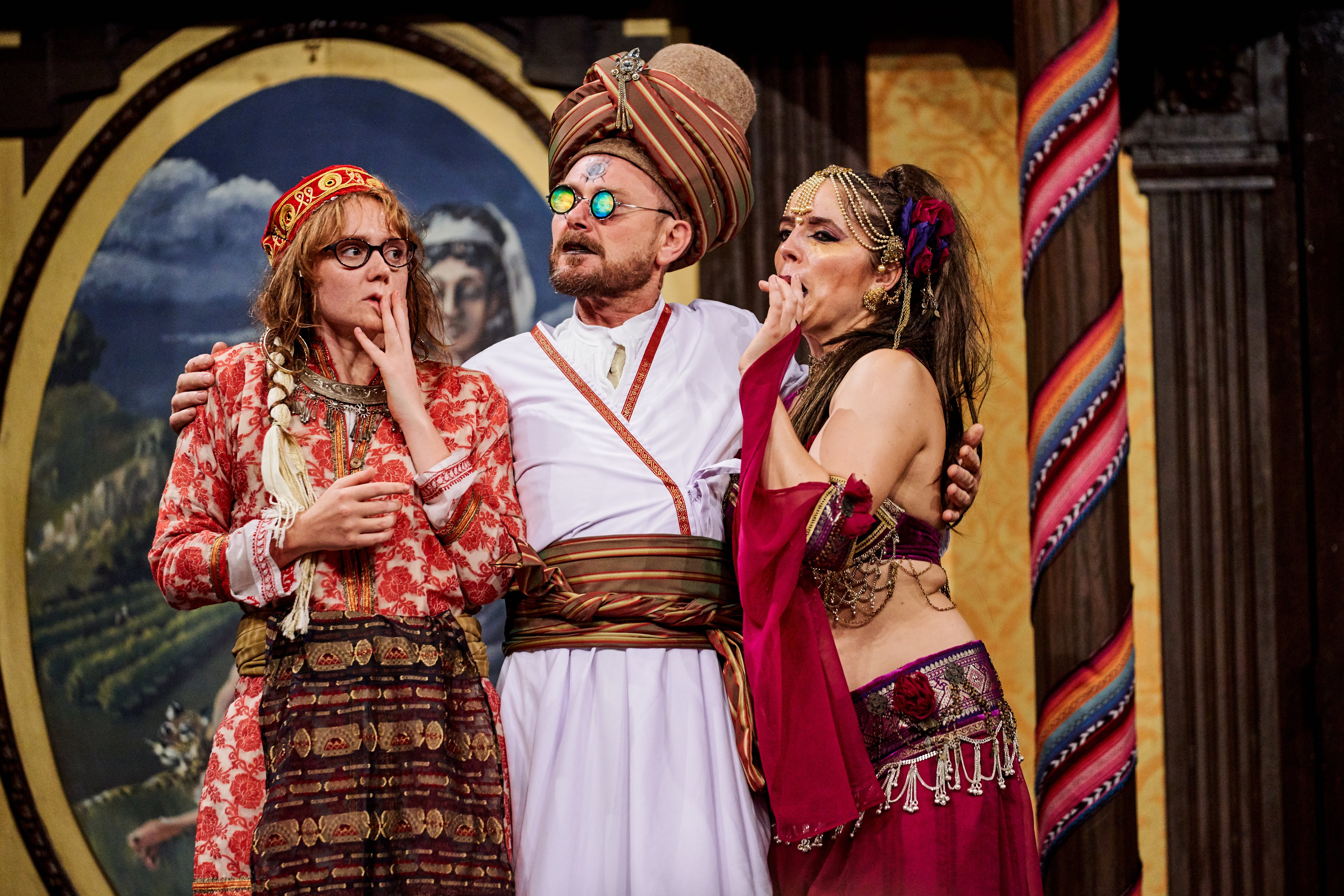
Amelia Reynolds as Luciana, Stephen Lovatt as Dr Pinch, Jess Holly Bates as the Courtesan in The Comedy of Errors at Pop-up Globe.

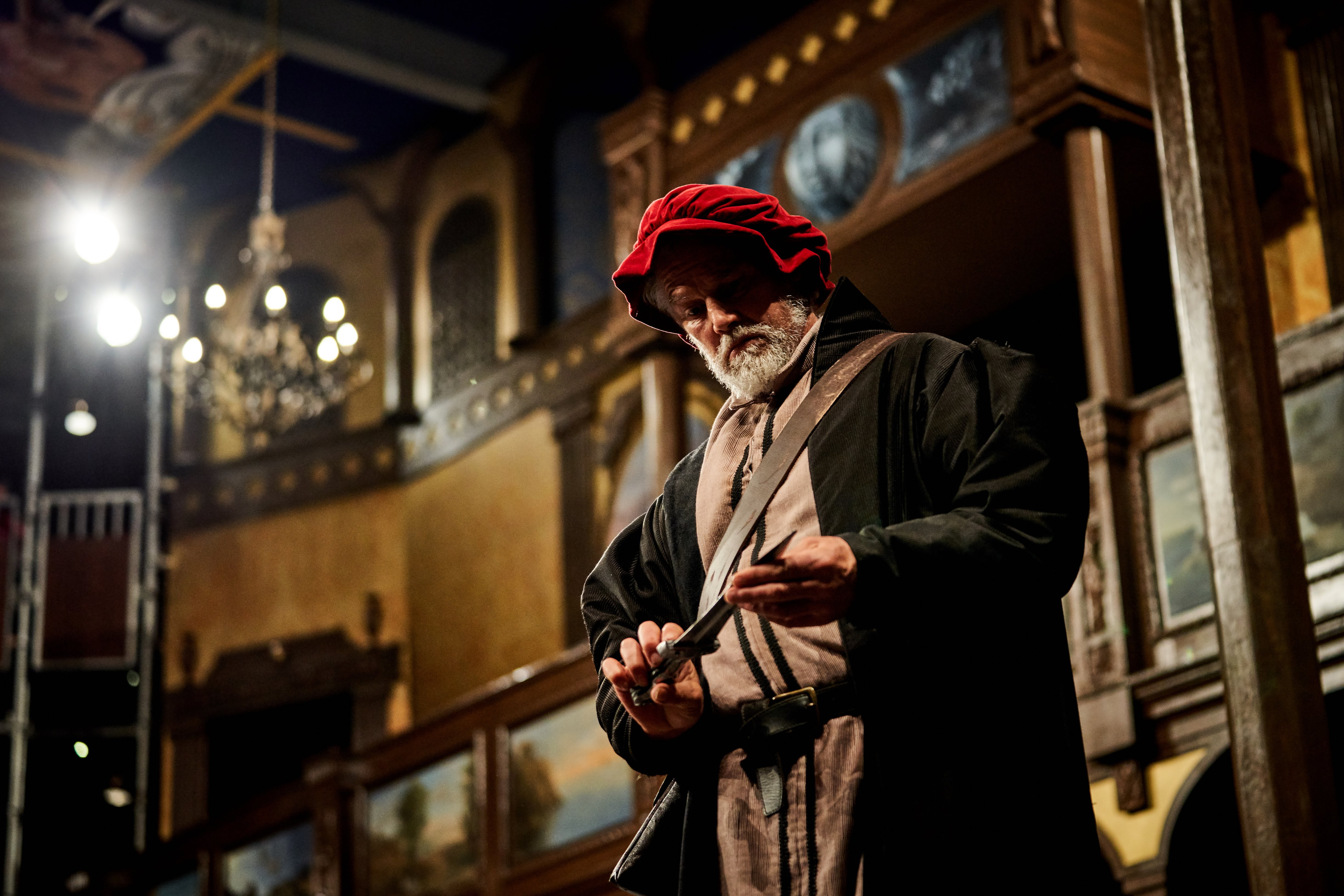
Peter Daube as Shylock in The Merchant of Venice in 2018 (c) Pop-up Globe

While the 2017 productions ran in Melbourne, in Auckland Pop-up Globe began rehearsals for their third summer season in Auckland on 30 October 2017. To lessen the logistical and financial pressure of trying to rehearse and open four productions simultaneously, the three companies and five productions that made up the third season had a 'staggered' rehearsal process and were opened one at a time. The Buckingham's Company opened A Midsummer Night's Dream on 7 December 2017 and The Merchant of Venice on 12 January 2018; the Pembroke's Company opened Julius Caesar on 11 January 2018; and the Southampton's Company opened Macbeth on 7 February 2018 and The Comedy of Errors on 22 February 2018. All five productions then played in repertory until Sunday 1 April 2018.

The interior of the playhouse was completely redecorated for Season Three: instead of brickwork and plaster intended to resemble modern Jacobean exterior architecture, a new frons scenae was installed, decorated in gold and blue with dark brown wood, intended to resemble a modern Jacobean interior space. The two faux marble stage pillars were replaced with narrower posts. Instead of the small projecting gallery that had been in the centre of the middle level of the frons scenae, a tarras now ran the whole length of the frons scenae at middle gallery level, and the previously flat garret level was given a projecting balcony for musicians. The 'honeymoon boxes' of the Season Two stage boxes were removed so that the flanking stage doors could be repositioned. A small bar was added to the playhouse yard so that audience members could buy drinks during performances without having to leave the theatre.

A Midsummer Night's Dream (directed by Miles Gregory) had portions of its script translated into Te Reo Māori by Pierre Lyndon. The court and lovers wore Jacobean dress, the Mechanicals were dressed as modern tradies in hardhats and high-vis vests, and the fairy world of Oberon, Titania and Puck were attired in traditional Māori dress and much of their text delivered entirely in Te Reo Māori. Jason Te Kare doubled as Theseus and Oberon, Edward Peni played Hippolyta and Titania, and Reuben Butler originated the role of Puck. The same company performed The Merchant of Venice (directed by David Lawrence) in Jacobean dress in a production that tried to solve the play's difficulties by embracing and amplifying them. Kevin Keys played Antonio, Sarah Griffin played Portia, Cameron Moore played Bassanio, and Peter Daubé played Shylock.

Julius Caesar (directed by Rita Stone) was presented by a reverse-gender cast in modern dress, with the premise of Rome as a female-led society where men were indentured slaves. Imagery from the 2016 US presidential elections in the first half gave way to combat gear and riot shields in the second half. Sheena Irving played Brutus, Alison Bruce played Cassius and Donogh Rees played the title role.

Macbeth (directed by Tom Mallaburn) was presented in medieval dress with singing witches, gruesome battle scenes and a supernatural music score played throughout the playhouse by actors hidden around all 360 degrees of the 'metal' O. Stephen Lovatt and Amanda Billing played the Macbeths. The same company performed The Comedy of Errors (directed by Miles Gregory) in Mediterranean dress featuring belly dancing and Whirling Dervishes, with Ephesus as a military police state. Paul Jennings and Jason Will played the Antipholuses and Tom Clark and Blake Kubena played the Dromios.

The Season Three productions were complemented with a number of pre-show talks and events before selected performances. The five productions played a combined total of 160 performances over the season, with A Midsummer Night's Dream and The Merchant of Venice extending by a fortnight at the end of the run, which finally closed on Sunday 15 May 2018.

Over 91,000 people attended Pop-up Globe during the 2018 season.

=== Sydney Transfer (September—December 2018) ===
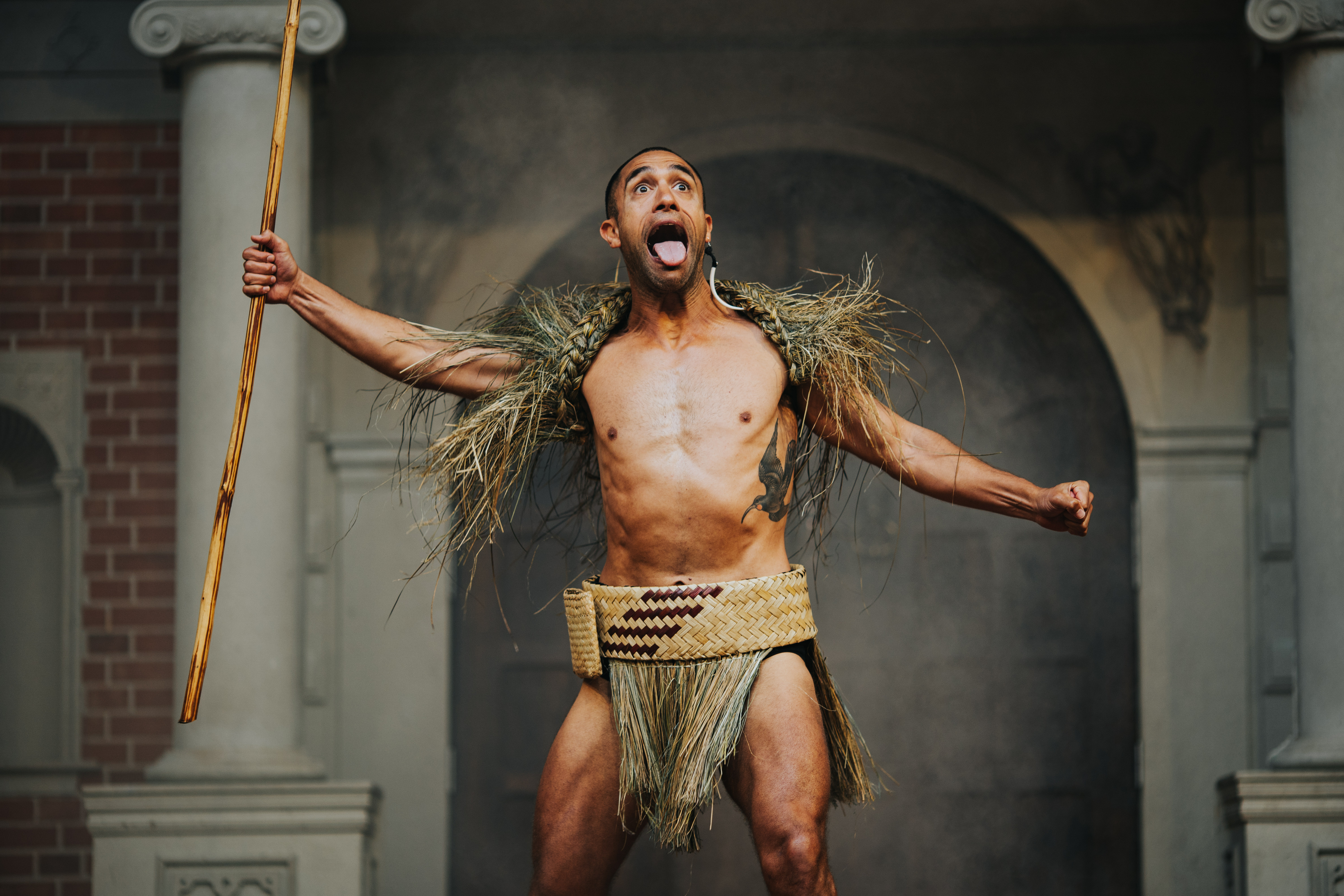
Jade Daniels as Puck in the Sydney transfer of A Midsummer Night's Dream (c) Pop-up Globe

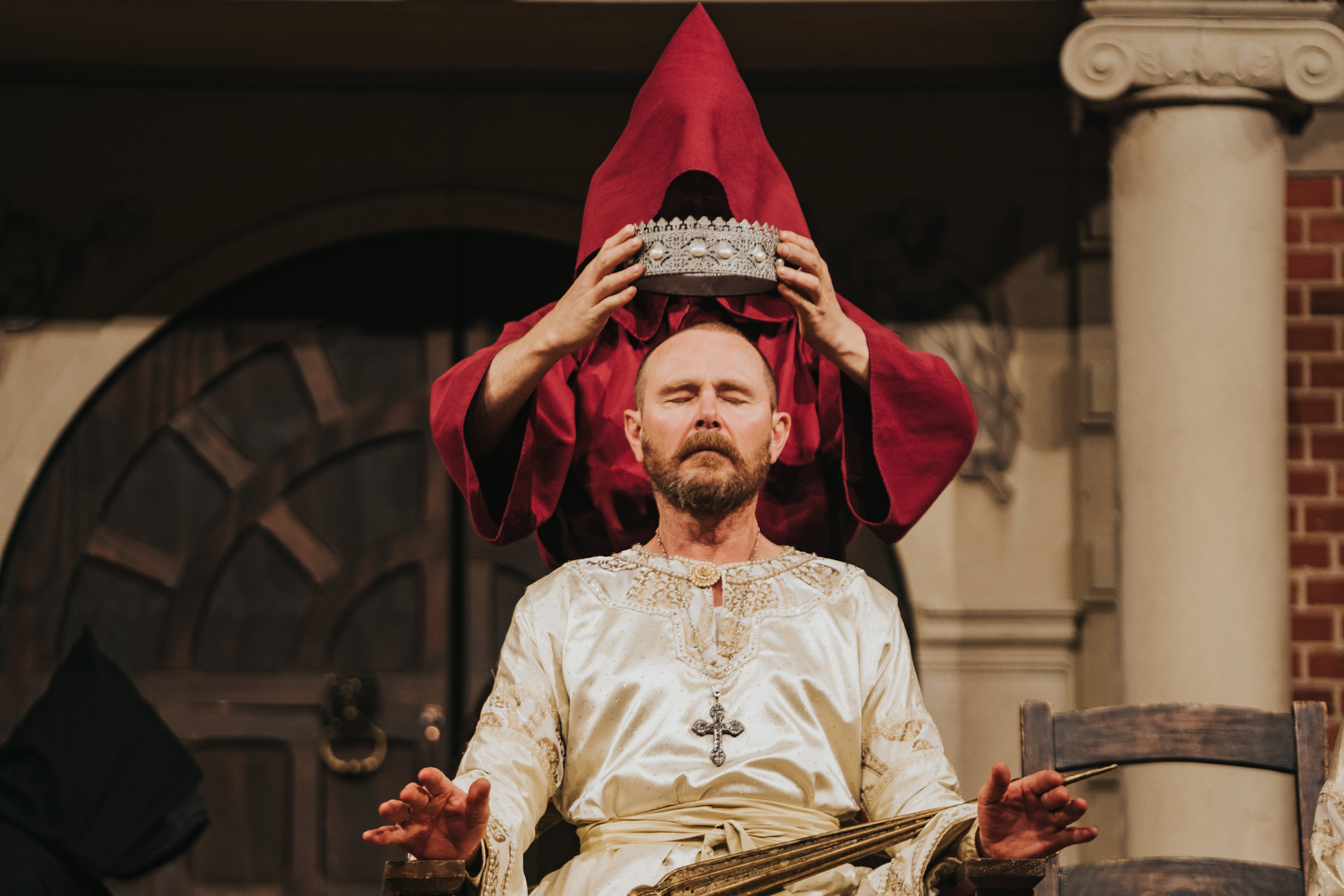
Stephen Lovatt in the Sydney transfer of Macbeth (c) Pop-up Globe

In partnership with Live Nation, Pop-up Globe opened their second Australian transfer in Sydney on 5 September 2018. Improving on their learnings from the Melbourne playhouse, Australian company Stage Kings constructed the fourth iteration of Pop-up Globe on the central lawn in Sydney's Entertainment Quarter, next to Fox Studios and the Sydney Cricket Ground. The Sydney transfer featured the Buckingham's Company's productions of A Midsummer Night's Dream and The Merchant of Venice and the Southampton's Company's productions of Macbeth and The Comedy of Errors. As per the Melbourne transfer, there were some cast changes, including Asalemo Tofete and Jade Daniels taking over the roles of Titania/Hippolyta and Puck in A Midsummer Night's Dream, Jonathan Martin taking over the role of Antonio in The Merchant of Venice and Hugh Sexton taking over the role of Antipholus of Syracuse in The Comedy of Errors.

The four productions played a cumulative total of 199 performance before Pop-up Globe Sydney closed on Sunday 16 December 2018. In the 2018 BroadwayWorld theatre awards, A Midsummer Night's Dream was named Best Production, with awards also going to actors Chris Huntly-Turner, Max Loban and Sarah Griffin. Brigid Costello was named Best Choreographer, Miles Gregory was named Best Director, and Bob Capocci and Shona Tawhaio won Best Costume Design.

Pop-up Globe Sydney was seen by over 105,000 people.

=== Season Four (November 2018 – April 2019) ===
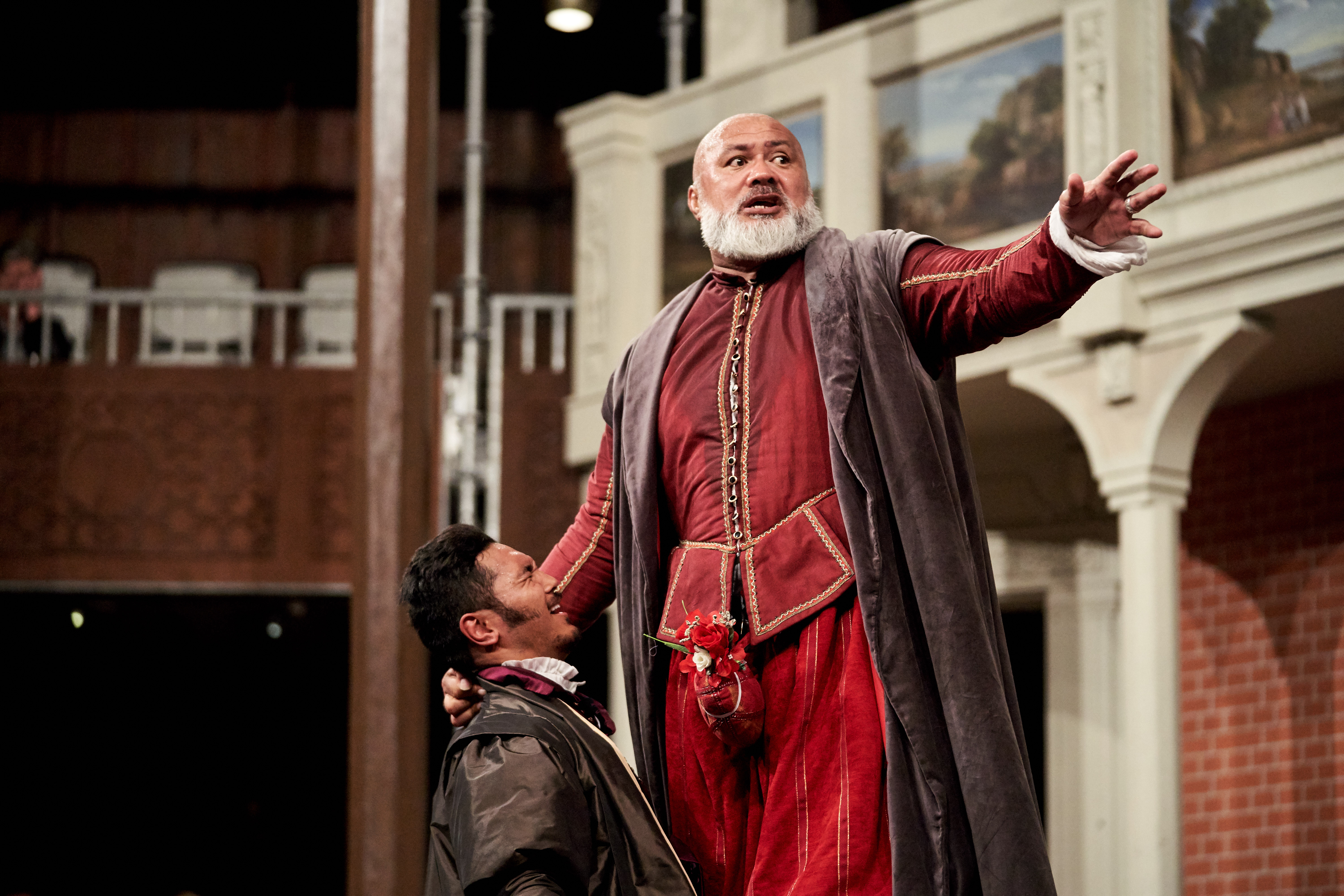
Theo David as Cambio and Dave Fane as Gremio in The Taming of the Shrew at Pop-up Globe.

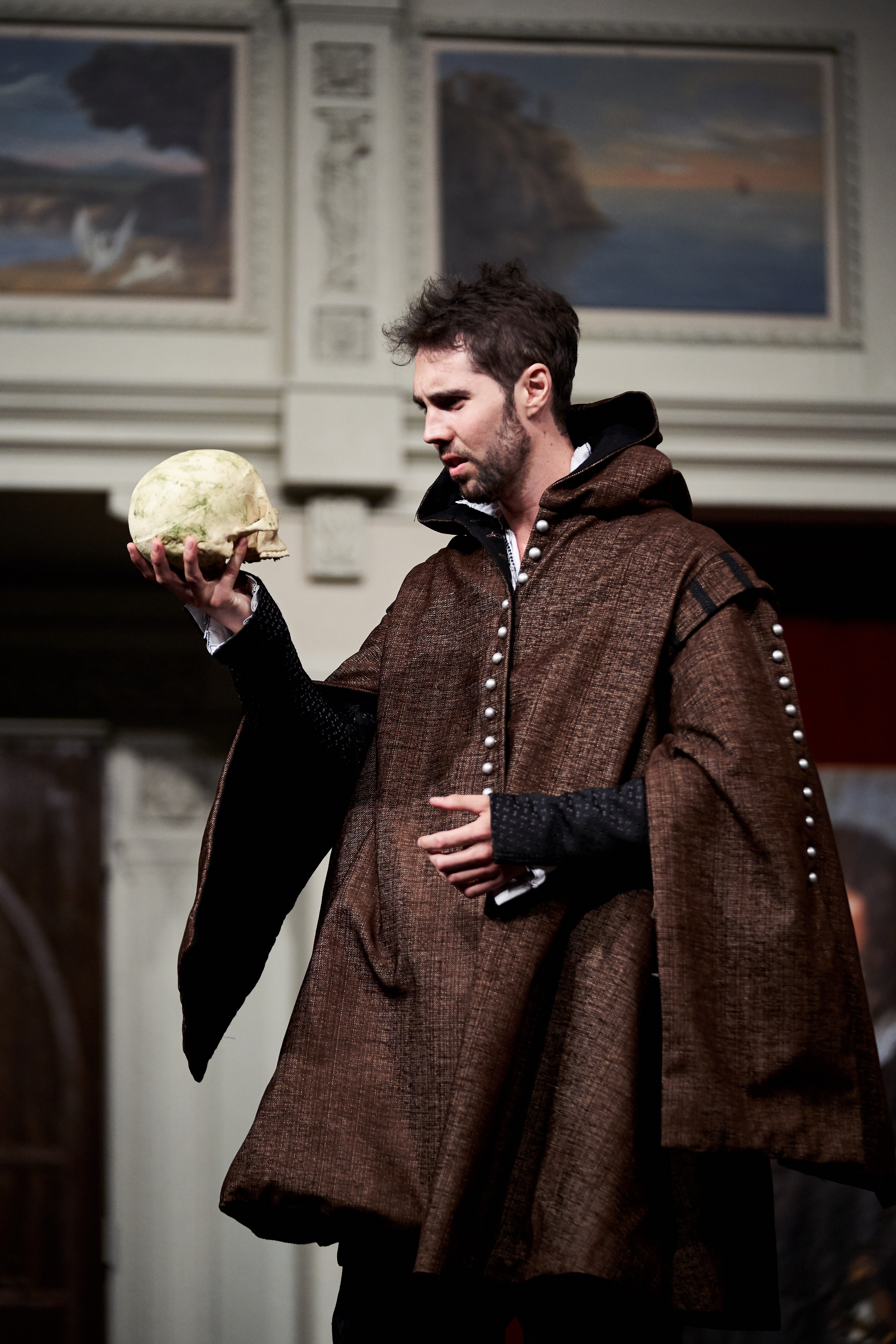
Adrian Hooke as Hamlet at Pop-up Globe in 2019.

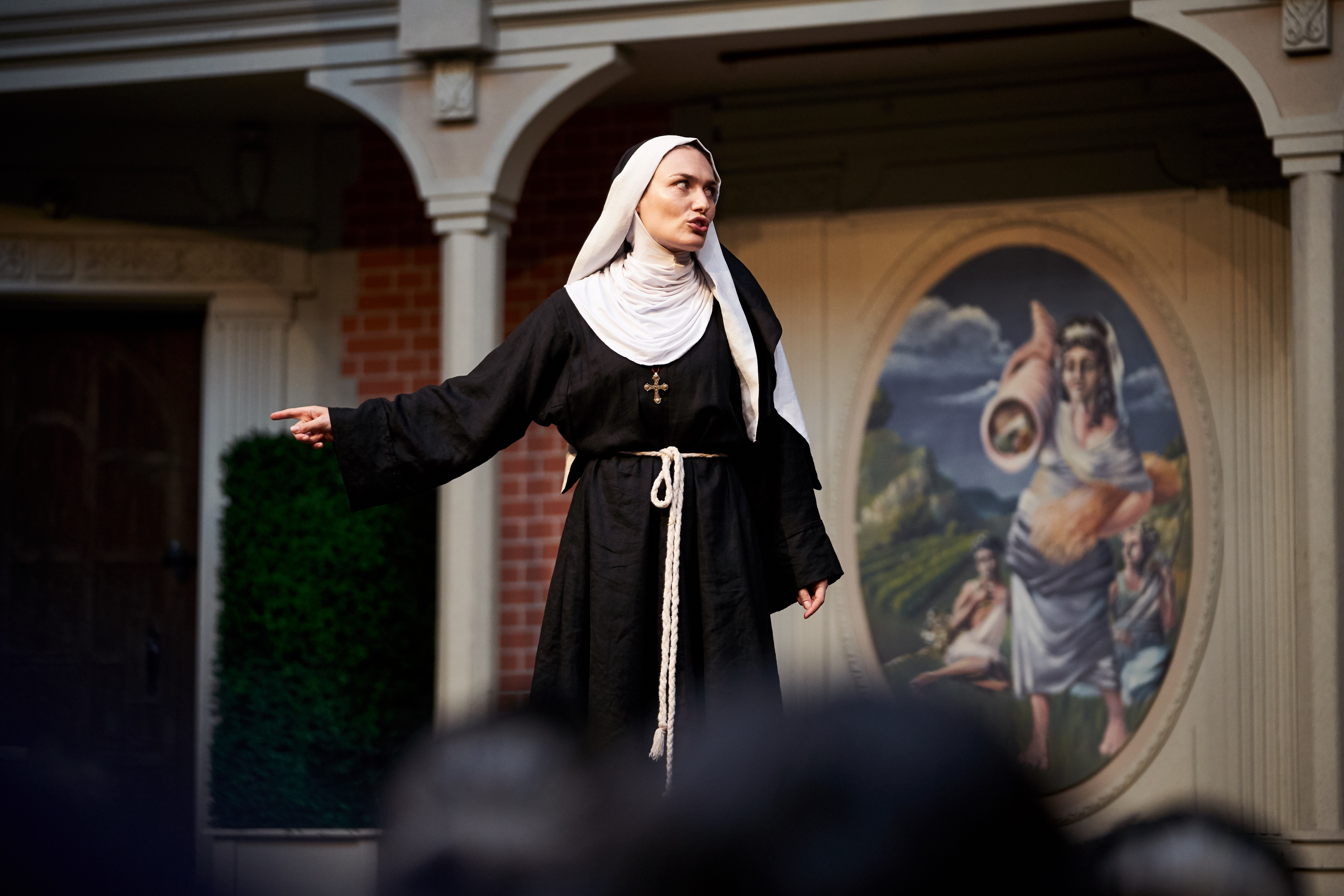
Rebecca Rogers as Isabella in Measure For Measure in 2019 (c) Pop-up Globe

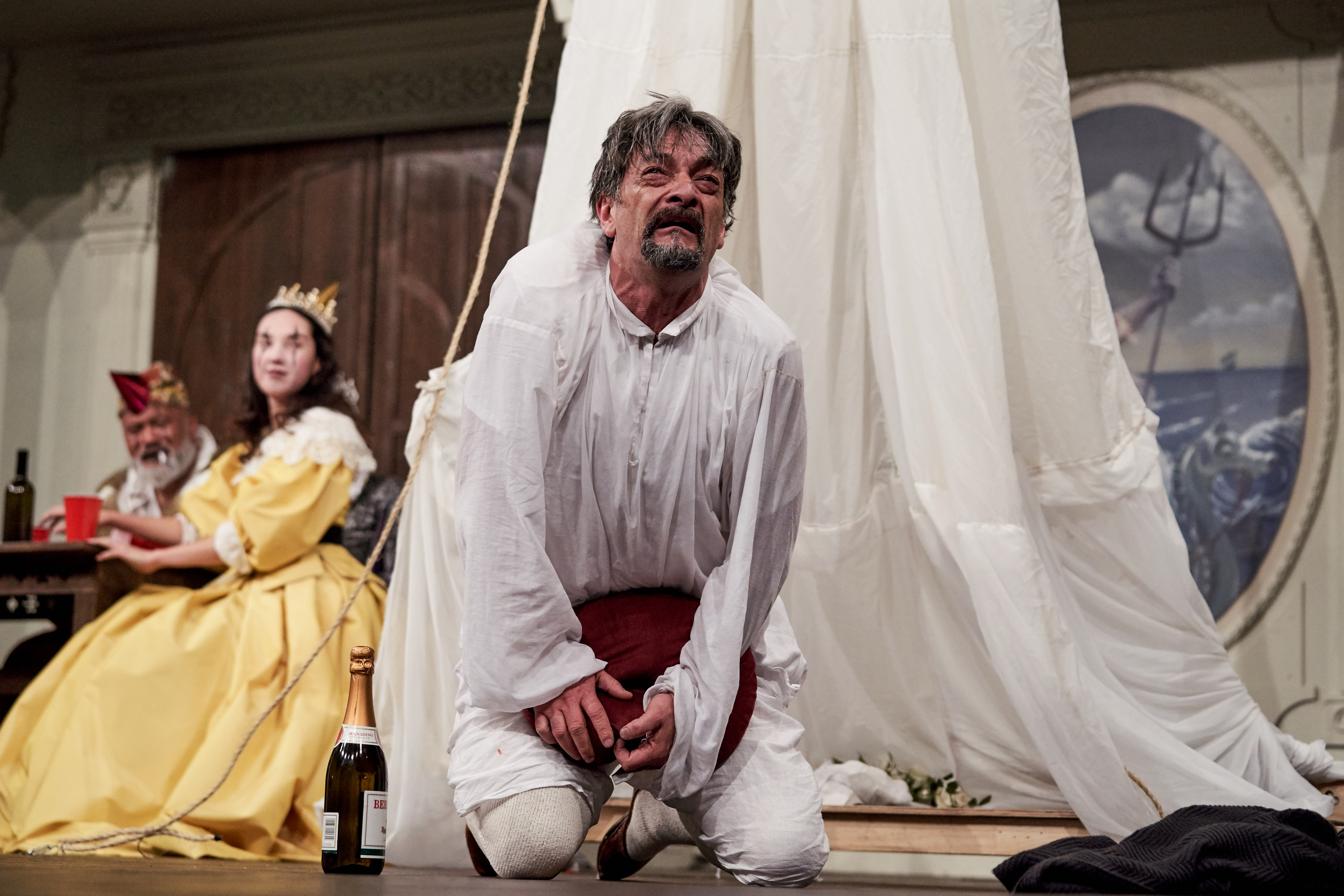
Stephen Butterworth as Richard III (c) Pop-up Globe

While in rehearsals for the Sydney transfer, in July 2018 Pop-up Globe that their fourth summer season in Auckland would feature The Taming of the Shrew, Richard III, Hamlet and Measure For Measure and that the productions would be thematically linked in their exploration of 'abuse of power'. Controversy greeted the announcement that The Taming of the Shrew and Richard III would be presented by an all-male cast, and the anger and outrage expressed by the Auckland theatre community led Pop-up Globe to announce a change in their artistic vision: from now on, all new work made by the company in Auckland would feature equal numbers of male and female actors across a season.

The interior of the playhouse was left in the same configuration as Season Three, with the wide tarras covering the whole middle gallery retained, but the frons scenae was repainted from its dark browns and golds into lighter marble colours, and sections of Jacobean brickwork reminiscent of the Season Two frons scenae were reintroduced. The yard bar was retired but two rows of raised bench seating were installed at the back of the yard, to provide audience members with an option in between a groundling ticket and a D-reserve seat.

To better manage the difficulties of internal staff being spread across four productions, and trying to maintain a large payroll without any infrastructural funding or subsidy, rather than present all four productions in repertory Pop-up Globe's fourth season was presented in two halves, with one company performing from November to January, and the other company performing from February to April.

The Somerset's Company began rehearsals on 1 October 2018, opening The Taming of the Shrew on 16 November 2018 and Richard III on 17 November 2018. The Taming of the Shrew (directed by Brigid Costello & David Lawrence) featured Natasha Daniel and Jamie Irvine as Katherina and Petruchio and was presented in 17th century Italian dress, with a rewritten version of the play's original framing device—in this case, Christopher Sly was a drunken audience member who passed out in the yard so that the cast could enlist the audience's support in their plan to gull him by dressing him in Jacobean attire and insisting when he regained consciousness that he was in England in 1616. Richard III (directed by Miles Gregory) starred Stephen Butterworth in the title role and featured authentic medieval pageantry, lavish Jacobean costumes, and a recreation of the Battle of Bosworth that included armies fighting with pikes and firing arquebuses.

The Nottingham's Company began rehearsals on 4 January 2019, opening Measure For Measure on 14 February 2019 and Hamlet on 15 February 2019. Measure For Measure (directed by Miles Gregory) featured Will Alexander as the Duke, Rebecca Rogers as Isabella and Hugh Sexton as Angelo, and was presented in 17th century Viennese dress with boisterous musical numbers and the Duke disguised as a blind friar with a comic German accent in the prison scenes. Hamlet (directed by David Lawrence) starred Adrian Hooke in the title role and was presented in Jacobean dress and investigating how the original staging might have worked, with use of a 'fast trap' to enable to Ghost to appear and disappear rapidly.

The four productions gave a combined total of 141 performances before the season finally closed on Sunday 14 April 2019. The season was complemented with a wide array of pre-show talks and post-show Q&As. The matinee of Measure For Measure on Sunday 17 February 2019 marked Pop-up Globe's 1000th performance.

Approximately 60,000 people attended the season.

=== New Zealand nationwide tour (June – September 2019) ===
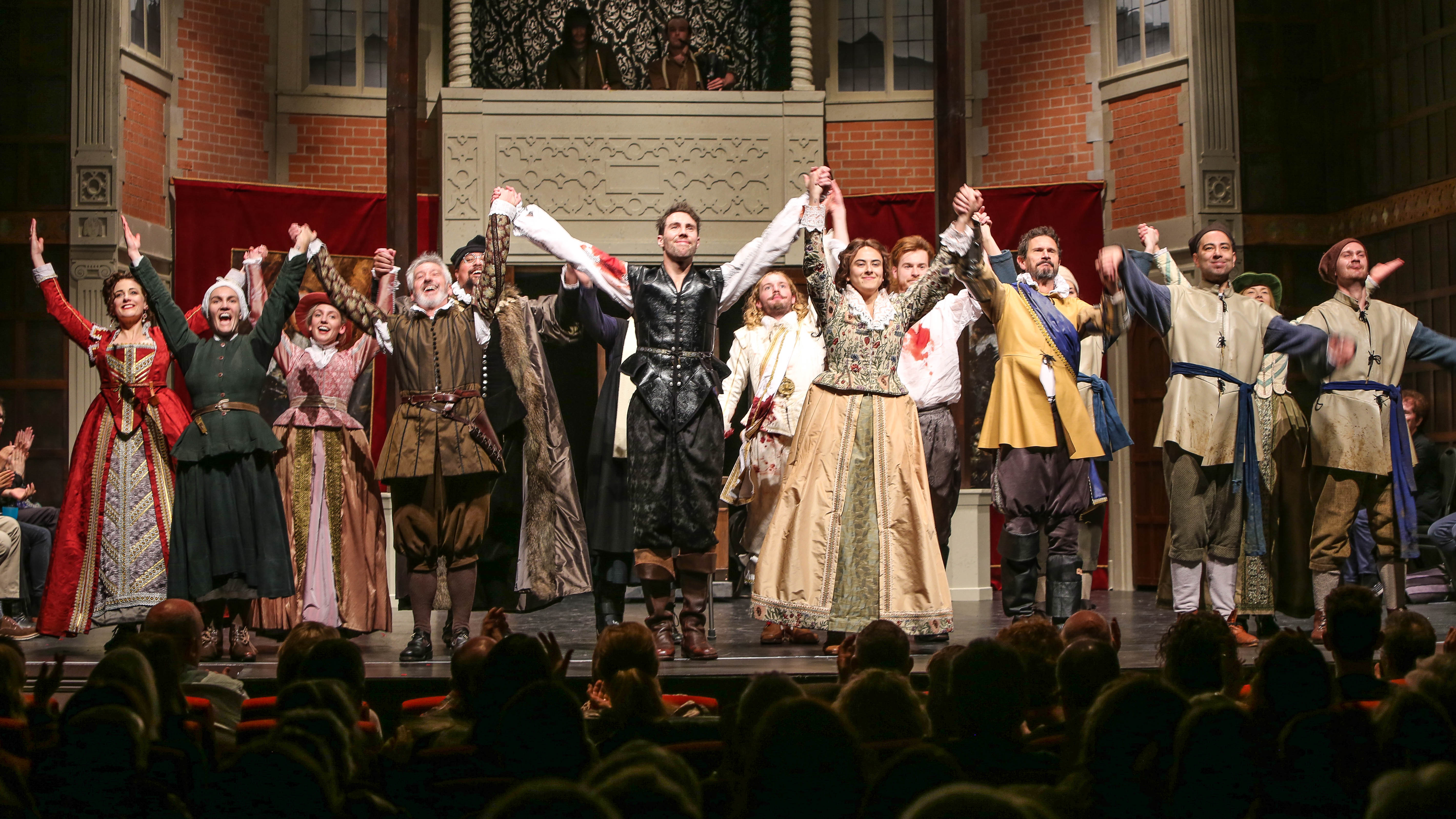
The Pop-up Globe touring company onstage at the Nelson Theatre Royal in July 2019. (c) Pop-up Globe.

Pop-up Globe undertook their first New Zealand tour during the winter of 2019. Scenic designer Malcolm Dale designed a touring set resembling an indoor Jacobean playhouse that could be easily reconfigured for differently-sized stage spaces and the Nottingham's Company's productions of Measure For Measure and Hamlet were remounted and revised for the touring set, with some major adjustments being made to both productions to reflect that they would be performing indoors in proscenium arch theatres. There were also a number of changes of personnel within the Nottingham's Company, including Clementine Mills taking over the role of Isabella in Measure For Measure and fan favourite Jonathan Tynan-Moss returning from the UK to take over as the Duke, whose disguise changed from a German friar to an evangelical Southern preacher.

The New Zealand tour opened at the Regent Theatre in Dunedin on 27 June 2019, and then played at the Theatre Royal in Nelson, the Isaac Theatre Royal in Christchurch, the Opera House in Wellington, the Municipal Theatre in Napier, the Clarence Street Theatre in Hamilton, and at TSB Theatre in New Plymouth, where the productions closed on 8 September 2019 after a combined total of 48 performances to an audience of approximately 25,000 people. Both productions also returned to Pop-up Globe's Auckland playhouse for a fortnight in August as part of the 2019 Winter Season.

=== 2019 Winter Season (July – August 2019 ===
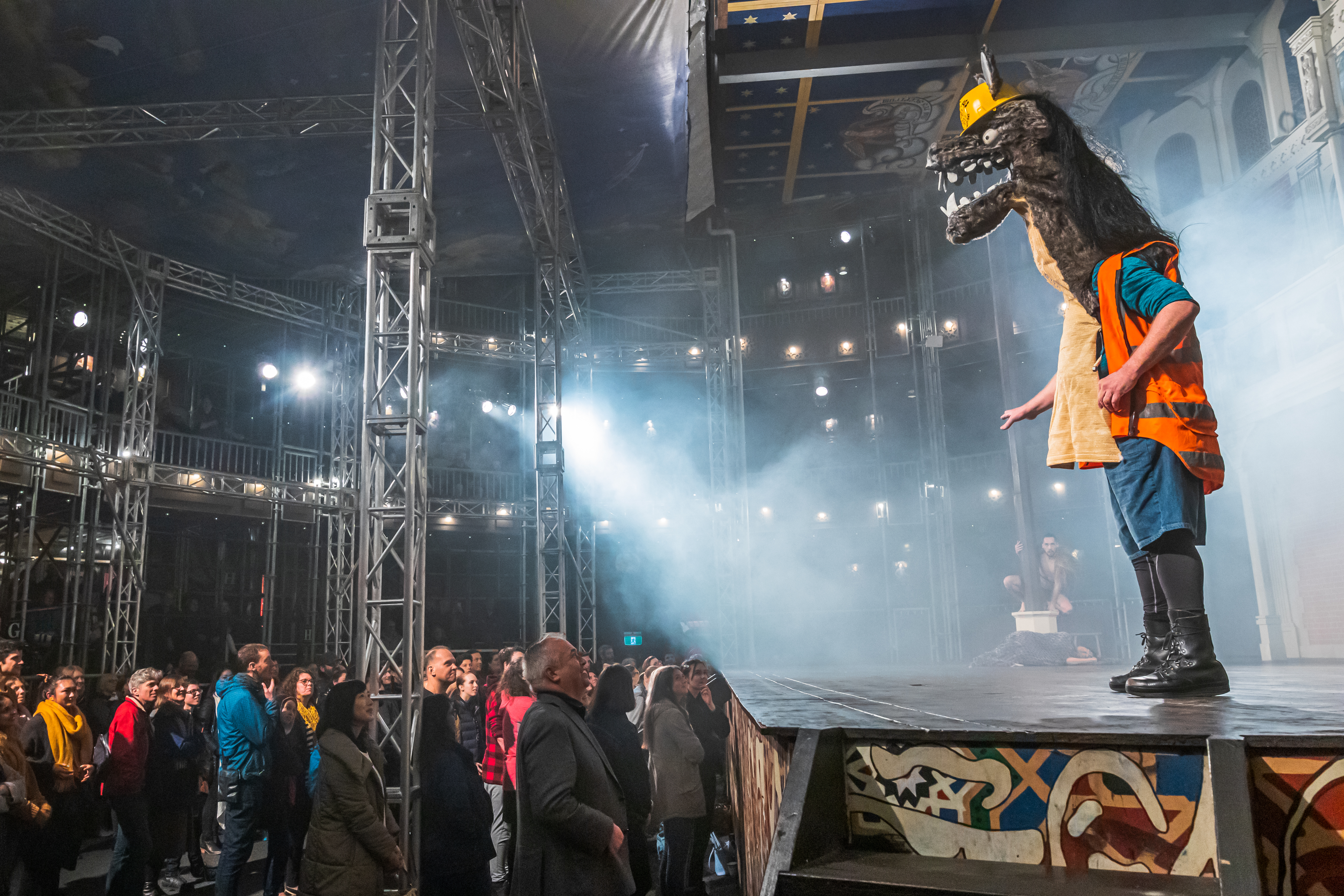
A Midsummer Night's Dream in the roofed playhouse in 2019 (c) Pop-up Globe

In addition to undertaking a nationwide tour, in April 2019 Pop-up Globe announced that they would present their first ever winter season in the Ellerslie playhouse in Auckland as part of ATEED's Elemental Festival. The partnership with ATEED would enable Pop-up Globe to build a temporary roof over the playhouse yard to provide protection from the weather for the groundlings. The specially-formed Exeter's Company would premiere new productions of Shakespeare's Twelfth Night and Middleton's The Roaring Girl. After considering ticket sales and weighing up the needs of that year's Australian transfer, the decision was made before rehearsals began to replace The Roaring Girl with a revival of 2017's A Midsummer Night's Dream. This was the first time Pop-up Globe had remounted an existing production with a new company and an almost entirely-new cast (Patrick Carroll reprised his performance as Demetrius, Jonathan Martin had played Snug in the Sydney transfer and now took on Egeus as well, and Reuben Butler, who had originated Puck in 2017, returned especially to play the role for the winter season). Anatonio Te Maioha played Oberon/Theseus and Renaye Tamati played Titania/Hippolyta. Twelfth Night (directed by Miles Gregory) was an entirely new production, utilising largely Elizabethan dress rather than Pop-up Globe's usual Jacobean costuming. Its cast included Rebecca Rogers as Viola, Sheena Irving as Olivia, Jonathan Martin as Malvolio and Keagan Carr Fransch as Feste.

Twelfth Night opened on 19 July 2019, followed by A Midsummer Night's Dream on 20 July 2019, and the productions played 35 performances in repertory until 26 August 2019. The Winter Season also featured daytime performances of the Stage Company's A Children's Midsummer Night's Dream and two performances of The Two Gentlemen of Verona by the Pop-up Globe Youth Theatre Company. Measure For Measure and Hamlet also played two weeks of encore performances in their revised touring format.

=== Perth transfer (October – December 2019) ===
In partnership with Live Nation, Pop-up Globe opened their third Australian transfer in the west Australian city of Perth on Wednesday 9 October 2019, on the grounds of the Crown Casino. While retaining the same interior frons scenae design as the Melbourne and Sydney versions of Pop-up Globe, itself re-purposed from the first version of the Ellerslie playhouse in Auckland, the Perth playhouse was redesigned in order to be easier and more cost effective to assemble. While still including the gold onion dome at the back of the double-gabled roof, the roof structure itself was simplified and the playhouse walls were canvas rather than corrugated iron as a means of improving internal temperature control.

The Perth transfer featured the Nottingham's Company's productions of Measure For Measure and Hamlet and the Exeter's Company's productions of Twelfth Night and A Midsummer Night's Dream. There were several cast changes in the Exeter's Company, including Eds Eramiha taking over the role of Puck in A Midsummer Night's Dream and Renaye Tamati taking over the role of Feste in Twelfth Night, but only one cast change in the Nottingham's Company who had by this stage been performing their two productions together for the whole year.

The four productions played in repertory until Pop-up Globe Perth closed on Sunday 8 December 2019 after a combined total of 107 performances to an audience of approximately 60,000 people. Several stalwart Pop-up Globe actors celebrated milestones during the Perth run, with musician Oscar West giving his 600th performance in the playhouse since the first season, and Adrian Hooke passing his 400th performance.

=== Season Five (December 2019 – March 2020) ===
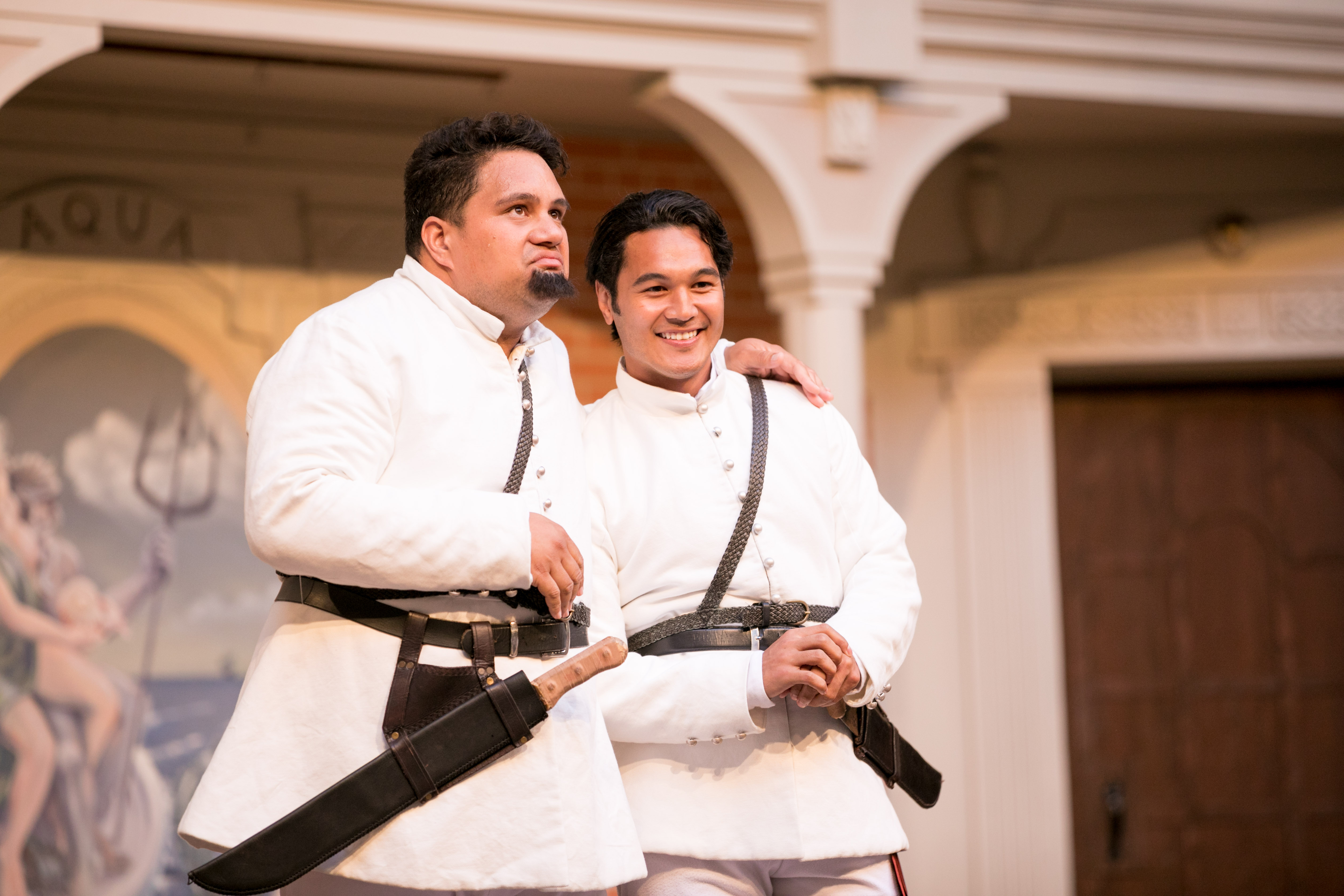
Theo David as Claudio and Rutene Spooner as Benedick in Much Ado About Nothing in 2019.

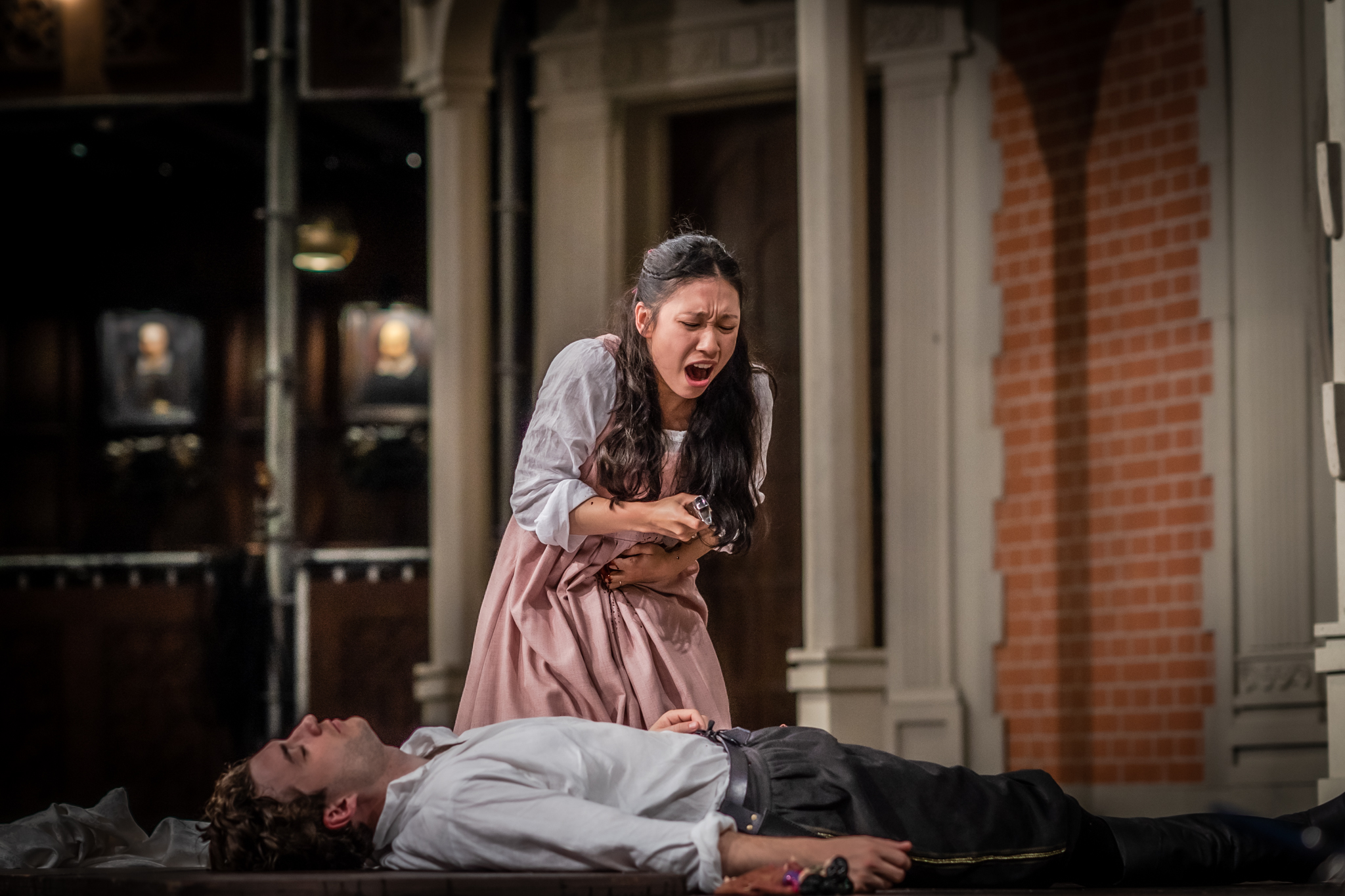
Darcy Kent and Jess Hong in Romeo and Juliet in 2019 (c) Pop-up Globe

In August 2019, amidst the New Zealand tour, the Winter Season and pre-production for the Perth transfer, Pop-up Globe announced that their fifth summer season would be their last time performing in Auckland, after which they would dismantle the Ellerslie playhouse and vacate their racecourse premises. Rather than continuing to develop new productions for Auckland audiences, Pop-up Globe would focus on the international market and re-purpose their now-extensive back catalogue of existing productions, having proved to themselves with the Perth transfer of A Midsummer Night's Dream that it was possible to remount older productions with entirely new casts and still retain the essence of the original show. The financial strain of trying to retain a permanent staff, company and building in Auckland while also maintaining offshore operations had led Pop-up Globe's management and board to conclude that it made best sense for the business to return to its original artistic purpose, which was to pop up Pop-up Globes in different cities and countries, and then pop them down again. Pop-up Globe's 'Summer of Love' Farewell Season would consist of three productions.

On 29 October 2019 the Northumberland's Company began rehearsals, beginning preview performances on 7 December before opening Romeo and Juliet on Friday 13 December and Much Ado About Nothing on Saturday 14 December. Romeo and Juliet (directed by Miles Gregory) was a brand new production of the play, starring Darcy Kent and Jess Hong in the title roles, with an eclectic mix of Jacobean dress and track-suited 'hoodies' as attendants, with the Capulets' masque a lavish fruit-themed party where the lovers first meet with Romeo dressed as a banana and Juliet as a giant strawberry. Much Ado About Nothing starred Renee Lyons and Rutene Spooner as Beatrice and Benedick and was a revival of Miriama McDowell's 2017 Pasifika-themed production but with an entirely new cast except for Theo David reprising his performance as Claudio. The two productions played in repertory until finally closing on Sunday 1 March 2020 after a combined total of 82 performances to audiences of approximately 40,000.

The Farewell Season also featured daytime performances of the Stage Company's A Children's Midsummer Night's Dream after its success during 2019's Winter Season, and four performances of All's Well That Ends Well by the Pop-up Globe Youth Theatre Company. The many strands of Pop-up Globe's Youth Theatre classes also combined for one night in December to present King Lear with different sections of the play performed by different age groups.

The third and final production of Pop-up Globe's Farewell Season was the first time a new play had been performed in the playhouse: after securing a licence for its southern hemisphere debut, Pop-up Globe presented the New Zealand premiere of Morgan Lloyd Malcolm's play Emilia, 18 months after its debut at Shakespeare's Globe in London and subsequent West End run. Pop-up Globe's production of Emilia was presented by the all-female Irihapeti Company and directed by Miriama McDowell. Emilia was the last production to perform at the Ellerslie playhouse, opening on Thursday 5 March 2020 amidst growing public concern about the approaching COVID-19 pandemic.

Government restrictions on mass gatherings as New Zealand began experiencing its first cases of the pandemic meant that the performance of Emilia on Sunday 15 March ended up being its last and the rest of the season was prematurely curtailed as the whole of New Zealand went into lockdown.

The company was put into liquidation a year later in March 2021, as it could no longer operate with no income or touring for the foreseeable future.
