= Paul McLaney =

New Zealand musician (born 1975)

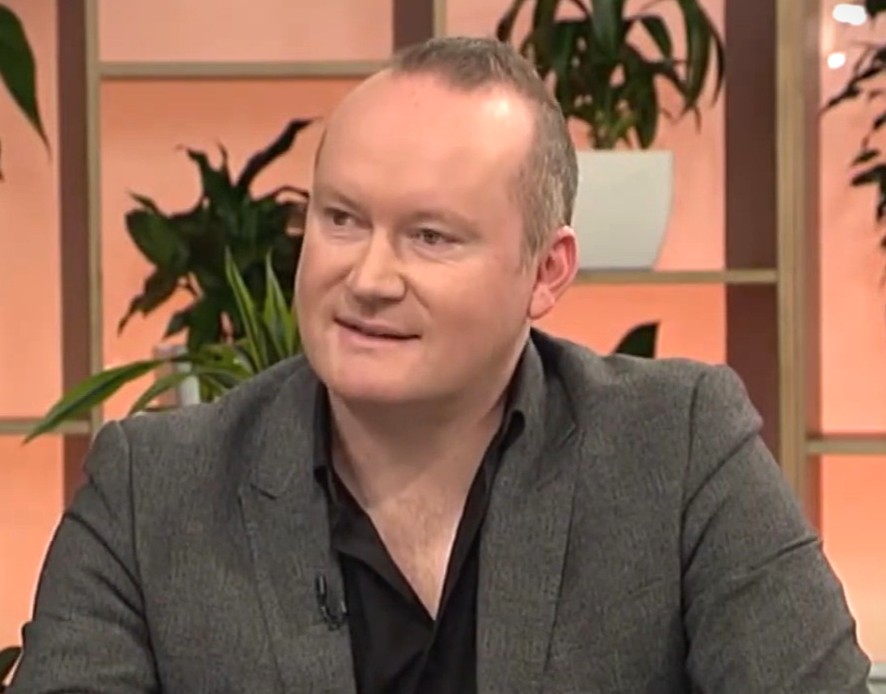
McLaney in 2017

Paul McLaney (born 1975 in Stockton-on-Tees, England) is a New Zealand-based pop music composer, singer and guitarist.

== Discography ==
=== Solo albums ===
- 1997 – Pedestrian – Paul McLaney
- 1998 – The Prayer Engine – Paul McLaney & The Avalanche Trio
- 2004 – The Shadows of Birds Flying Fall Slowly Down The Tall Buildings – Paul McLaney
- 2006 – EDIN – Paul McLaney
- 2007 – Diamond Side – Paul McLaney
- 2017 – Play On – Paul McLaney
- 2020 – The Old Traditions – Paul McLaney and Raashi Malik
- 2024 – An Arrow Made Of Air – Paul McLaney
- 2024 – As The North Attracts The Needle – Paul McLaney
- 2025 – The Daylight Moon – Paul McLaney
- 2026 – EXEGESIS – Paul McLaney

=== Gramsci ===
- 2000 – Permanence – Gramsci
- 2002 – Object – Gramsci
- 2005 – Like Stray Voltage – Gramsci
- 2020 – Inheritance – Gramsci
- 2022 - The Hinterlands – Gramsci
- 2022 - In Formation – Gramsci
- 2025 - Know Return – Gramsci

=== The Impending Adorations ===
- 2011 – Broken Science e.p. – The Impending Adorations
- 2012 – Gestalt – The Impending Adorations
- 2013 – Intentions – The Impending Adorations
- 2013 – Further – The Impending Adorations
- 2015 – The Best Is Yet To Come (single) – The Impending Adorations
- 2015 – Threshold – The Impending Adorations
- 2019 – Allies – The Impending Adorations
- 2019 – Alliances 1: A Handful of Dust The Impending Adorations feat Jef Boyle

=== Collaborations ===
- 2010 – Nameless Sons
- 2011 – Immram: The Voyage of the Corvus Corrone
- 2016 – Heart's Ease – Music from the Pop-up Globe
- 2017 – Under The Greenwood Tree – Music from the Pop-up Globe

=== Work for theatre ===
- 2014 – Speaking in Tongues – Silo Theatre
- 2015 – FALLOUT: The Sinking of the Rainbow Warrior – The Large Group
- 2015 – Enlightenment – Auckland Theatre Company
- 2015 – 8 Gigabytes of Hardcore Pornography – Silo Theatre
- 2015 – Love & Information – The Actor's Programme
- 2015 – K Rd Strip – Okareka
- 2016 – Romeo & Juliet – The Pop-up Globe
- 2016 – Twelfth Night – The Pop-up Globe
- 2016 – The Voice in My Head – Perendale
- 2016 – Venus in Fur – Auckland Theatre Company
- 2016 – Vernon God Little – The Actor's Programme
- 2016 – Lucrece – Auckland Shakespeare Company
- 2016 – Manawa – Okareka
- 2016 – Once There Was A Woman – Theatre Physical
- 2016 – Play On
- 2017 – A Streetcar Named Desire – Silo Theatre
- 2017 – Othello – The Pop-up Globe
- 2017 – Much Ado About Nothing – The Pop-up Globe
- 2017 – As You Like It – The Pop-up Globe
- 2017 – Henry V – The Pop-up Globe
- 2017 – A Midsummer Night’s Dream – The Pop-up Globe
- 2018 – The Merchant of Venice – The Pop-up Globe
- 2018 – Julius Caesar – The Pop-up Globe
- 2018 – MacBeth – The Pop-up Globe
- 2018 – Comedy of Errors– The Pop-up Globe
- 2018 – Conversations With Dead Relatives – Flaxworks
- 2018 – A Gambler’s Guide to Dying – Burrowed Time
- 2018 – The Taming of the Shrew – The Pop-up Globe
- 2018 – Richard III – The Pop-up Globe
- 2018 – HOMOS – Brilliant Adventures
- 2019 – Hamlet – The Pop-up Globe
- 2019 – Measure for Measure – – The Pop-up Globe
- 2019 – Half of the Sky – Massive Theatre Company
- 2019 – Romeo & Juliet – The Pop-up Globe
- 2019 – Twelfth Night – The Pop-up Globe
- 2020 – Te Whare Kupua – Massive Theatre Company
- 2025 – Murder On The Orient Express – Auckland Theatre Company
- 2025 – Every Kind of Weather – Brilliant Adventures
- 2026 – JOB – Silo Theatre
