= Estella Daniels =

British actress

- Occupation: Actress
- Years active: 2011–present
- Known for: Sinbad (TV series)

Estella Daniels is an English actress and dancer, best known for her role as Nala in Sinbad.

== Career ==
Daniels has worked extensively in theatre, performing in Racing Demon (play) at the Crucible Theatre in Sheffield, Iya Ile at the Soho Theatre and Festa at the Young Vic.

In 2011, Sky1 announced that Daniels would play Nala in the television drama Sinbad opposite Elliot Knight and Marama Corlett.

Daniels also appeared in Da Vinci's Demons in 2013, as well as the second season of Death in Paradise.

== Personal life ==
Prior to filming Sinbad, Daniels could not swim. She took an intensive swimming course to prepare for the role.

== Filmography ==
Year	Title	Role	Notes
2010	Thorne: Scaredy Cat	Karal	
2010	Ashes to Ashes	Tsitsi	1 episode
2012	Sinbad	Nala	7 episodes
2013-2014	Da Vinci's Demons	Zita	6 episodes
2013	Death in Paradise	Kim Neville	1 episode
2017	Father Brown	Dione Moon	Episode 5.3 "The Eve of St John"
