= Orgy (disambiguation) =

An orgy is a party where guests freely engage in sexual activity

Orgy may also refer to:

- Group sex
- Orgy (band), a synth rock band from Los Angeles, California
- Orgy (game), a board game
- "Orgy" (song), by The Glove from Blue Sunshine (1983)
- "The Orgy", a 2019 episode of television series What We Do in the Shadows
- "The Orgy" (Plebs), a 2014 television episode
- A musical marathon radio format created by WHRB 95.3 in Cambridge, Massachusetts
- Orgion, plural orgia, ecstatic rites primarily associated with Dionysian religion
