= Surviving Summer =

Surviving Summer may refer to:

- Surviving Summer (TV series), a 2022 Australian teen drama television series
- According to Greta, a 2009 American drama film directed by Nancy Bardawil, released in the UK as Surviving Summer
