= My Only One (disambiguation) =

My Only One may refer to:

- Iisa Pa Lamang, a Filipino television series
- My Only One (TV series), a South Korean television series

== See also ==
- The Only One (disambiguation)
