= The Only One =

The Only One(s) or Only One may refer to:

== Music ==
=== Albums ===
- The Only One (Kenny Barron album), 1990
- Only One (Shinhwa album), or the title song, 2000
- Only One (U-KISS album), 2010
- The Only Ones (album), by The Only Ones, 1978
- Only One (BoA album), 2012
- Only One (EP), by Bang Ye-dam, or the title song, 2023
- Only One, an album by Bizzy Bone, 2006

=== Songs ===
==== Songs with articles ====
- "Only One" (BoA song), 2013
- "The Only One" (The Cure song), 2008
- "Only One" (Goo Goo Dolls song), 1995
- "Only One" (James Taylor song), 1985
- "Only One" (Kanye West song), 2014
- "The Only One" (Kiyotaka song), 2011
- "Only One" (Peter Andre song), 1996
- "The Only One" (Scooter song), 2011
- "Only One" (Sigala song), 2016
- "The Only One" (Transvision Vamp song), 1989
- "Only One" (Yellowcard song), 2005

==== Other songs ====
- "The Only One", by the American Analog Set from Know by Heart, 2001
- "Only One", by Big Time Rush, 2024
- "The Only One", by the Black Keys from Brothers, 2010
- "The Only One", by Blu & Exile from Give Me My Flowers While I Can Still Smell Them, 2012
- "The Only One", by Bryan Adams from Cuts Like a Knife, 1983
- "Only One", by Caedmon's Call from Long Line of Leavers, 2000
- "Only One", by Caleb Johnson from Testify, 2014
- "The Only One", by Cro-Mags from Best Wishes, 1989
- "The Only One", by Danger Mouse and Jemini from Ghetto Pop Life, 2003
- "The Only One", by Evanescence from The Open Door, 2006
- "Only One", by Girls' Generation from Holiday Night, 2017
- "Only One", by the Grass Roots from Move Along, 1972
- "The Only One", by (həd) p.e. from Blackout, 2003
- "The Only One", by Hot Chelle Rae from Whatever, 2011
- "The Only One", by Huey Lewis and the News from Picture This, 1982
- "The Only One", by Jimmy Page, with Robert Plant on vocals, from Outrider, 1988
- "Only One", by Jon B. from Comfortable Swagg, 2012
- "The Only One", by Kevin Coyne from Bursting Bubbles, 1980
- "Only One", by Khea with Julia Michaels and Becky G featuring Di Genius, 2021
- "Only One", by Lifehouse from No Name Face, 2000
- "The Only One", by Limp Bizkit from Results May Vary, 2003
- "The Only One" by Lionel Richie from Can't Slow Down, 1983
- "The Only One", by Moka Only from Magickal Weirdness, 2015
- "The Only Ones" by Moloko from Statues, 2003
- "The Only One", by Pet Shop Boys from Nightlife, 1999
- "The Only One", by Phoenix from Alpha Zulu, 2022
- "Only One", by PJ Morton from New Orleans, 2013
- "Only One", by Sammy Adams, 2012
- "The Only One", by Screaming Jets from All for One, 1991
- "Only One", by Slipknot from Mate. Feed. Kill. Repeat., 1996
- "Only One", by Sophie Ellis-Bextor from Trip the Light Fantastic, 2007
- "The Only One", by Stiff Little Fingers from Go for It, 1981
- "Only One", by Tommy Tutone from Tommy Tutone 2, 1981
- "The Only One", by Vitamin C, a bonus track on Vitamin C
- "The Only One", by the Wildhearts from ¡Chutzpah!, 2009

== Other uses ==
- The On1y One, a 2024 Taiwanese television drama series
- The Only One (1952 film), a Cuban musical film
- The Only One (2006 film), a Belgian comedy-drama
- The Only One, a 2003 fiction anthology by Christine Feehan
- The Only Ones, an English rock band

== See also ==
- One and Only (disambiguation)
- The One and Only (disambiguation)
- You're the Only One (disambiguation)
- "I'm Not the Only One", a 2014 song by Sam Smith
- "I'm the Only One", a 1993 song by Melissa Etheridge
