= Maury Ginsberg =

American actor

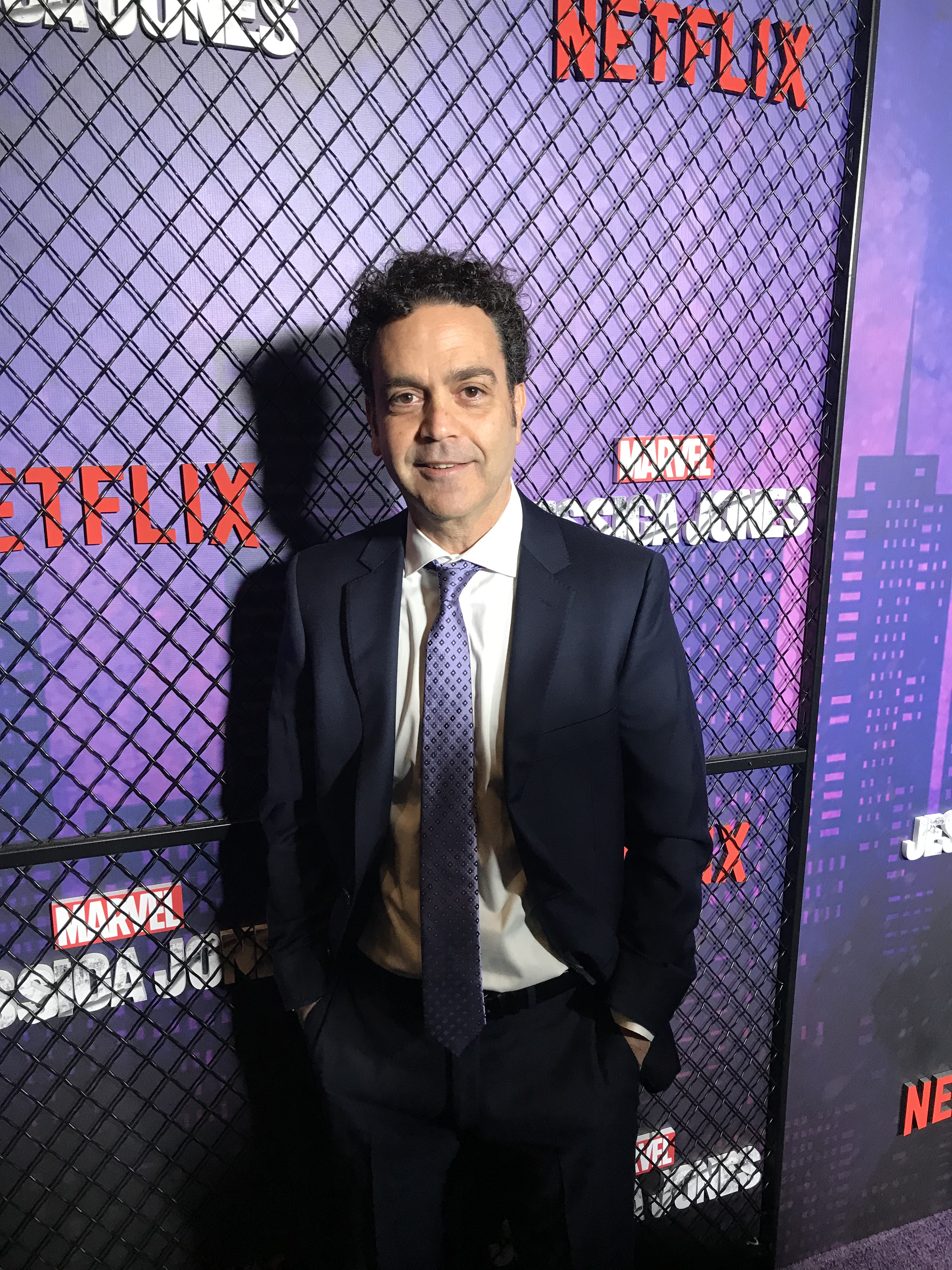
- Maury Ginsberg at the second season premiere of Jessica Jones in New York, March 7, 2018
- Born: July 15, 1970 (age 56)
- Education: Bard College
- Occupation: Actor
- Known for: Jessica Jones, Manifest, The Week Of, 5 Flights Up

Maury Ginsberg is an American theater, film and television actor. He is best known for his recurring roles as Steven Benowitz on season 2 of Jessica Jones and Simon White on season 2 of NBC's Manifest.

== Early life and education ==
Maury Ginsberg is a graduate of Bard College.

== Career ==
=== Theater ===
Ginsberg has been active in the theater community since performing in both The American Clock and The Resistible Rise of Arturo Ui. He spent three seasons at the Williamstown Theatre Festival where he met friend and mentor Olympia Dukakis. The two have worked together on a number of plays over the last 20 years, including Mother Courage and The Cherry Orchard. In 2015, an "excellent Maury Ginsburg" appeared in the Off Broadway Cherry Lane Theatre's "Laugh it Up, Stare it Down", playing a series of different characters that impact the protagonists' lives.

In 2016, he appeared in the Pulitzer Prize winning play, Disgraced, at The Cincinnati Playhouse. The Cincinnati Gazette described his work as "distinctive and outstanding", The Cincinnati Enquirer referred to it as "superb". In 2019, on the heels of the Tree of Life synagogue incident in Pittsburgh, Ginsberg performed in Paula Vogel's Indecent at the Pittsburgh Public Theater. The Pittsburgh Current described his performance as "the foundational center of this production playing Lemml with a power as quiet as it is electrifying."

He appeared in many other plays including The Lion in Winter, The Substance of Fire, Freedomland, Intimate Apparel, and The Underpants. Erin Morrison Fortunato of the Rochester City Newspaper said of the play The Underpants, "Maury Ginsberg's neurotic, nearly Woody Allen-esque portrayal of Cohen, a hypochondriac geek with spastic tendencies, is the standout. One can't help but feel for this socially backwards introvert while at the same time hating him for preventing Louise from reaching sexual satisfaction with Versati."

=== Television ===
Ginsberg has made guest appearances in several TV shows since 1995. He first appeared in Murphy Brown as Scuz in 1995. In 1996 he played a hippie also named Maury Ginsberg in "Death Wish", an episode of Star Trek: Voyager. The following year he made a guest appearance on two episodes of Friends in "The One Where Ross and Rachael Take a Break" and "The One the Morning After" as Isaac, the copy shop clerk.

From 1998-1999 he played the recurring role of Kamen on Two Guys, a Girl and a Pizza Place opposite Ryan Reynolds and Nathan Fillion. He has appeared in many episodes of Law & Order, Law & Order: Special Victims Unit and Law & Order: Criminal Intent. Additional TV appearances include NYPD Blue, Without a Trace, Joan of Arcadia, House of Cards, Blue Bloods, Damages and Louie, among others. More recent appearances include episodes of The Blacklist, Madam Secretary, Elementary, What We Do in the Shadows and Jessica Jones.

He has also appeared in American Horror Stories. Other more recent recurring roles include Brett in the Hulu series Saint X, attorney Scott Quinn on Law & Order, and attorney Moishe Abromovitz Jr. opposite Samuel L. Jackson in The Last Days of Ptolemy Grey.

Ginsberg has appeared in two made for TV films, Lansky in 1999 opposite Richard Dreyfuss and Divas in 1996.

=== Film ===
Ginsberg has also appeared in many films starting in his role as Deitz in occult horror flick Voodoo in 1995. Four years later Ginsberg appeared in Where's Marlowe? as a surly cop. Ginsberg played a small part as a video store clerk in The Ring, but the scenes only appeared in the Deleted Scenes portion of the DVD, and he went uncredited for this role. He starred alongside Jonah Hill, Denis O'Hare and Reece Thompson in the 2007 Sundance winner comedy-drama Rocket Science as the hopeless speech pathologist, Mr. Lewinsky. That same year he also appeared as Marcus Broyard with Sigourney Weaver in The Girl in the Park.

In 2009, Ginsberg appeared in My One and Only with Renée Zellweger, Chris Noth and Kevin Bacon as Mr. Dillon. That same year he also appeared alongside Hilary Duff, Evan Ross, Michael Murphy and Ellen Burstyn as Lou in According to Greta. In 2012, Ginsberg starred alongside Drew Barrymore and John Krasinski in the family drama Big Miracle. He starred alongside actors Morgan Freeman and Diane Keaton in the 2015 film 5 Flights Up. In 2018, he starred in the Netflix feature The Week Of, with Adam Sandler and Chris Rock.

== Filmography ==
=== Film ===
- The Week Of (2018) Jay
- 5 Flights Up (2015) Dr. Kramer
- Big Miracle (2012) News Producer #1
- According to Greta (2009) Lou
- My One and Only (2009) Mr. Dillon
- The Girl in the Park (2007) Marcus Broyard
- Rocket Science (2007) Mr. Lewinsky
- Shattered Bits (Short) (2005) Elevator Guy
- The Ring (2002) Video Store Clerk-DVD deleted scenes –uncredited
- Where's Marlowe? (1999) Surly Cop
- Voodoo (1995) Deitz

=== TV movie ===
- Lansky (1999)
- Divas (1996) The Yard Engineer

=== Television ===
- Saint X (2023) Brent
- Manifest (2020) Simon White
- What We Do in the Shadows Episode: "Citizenship" (2019) Immigration Officer
- Jessica Jones (2018–2019) Steven Benowitz
- Elementary S5:E20 The Arts of Sleights and Deception (2017) Keating
- Madam Secretary S2:E18 On The Clock (2016) Fr. Paul Swartzwelder
- Vinyl S1:E4 The Racket (2016) Doug
- The Blacklist S3:E12 The Vehm (2016) Dr. Campbell Meyer Jan 28
- Blue Bloods S4:E5 Lost and Found (2013) Scott Holden
- House of Cards S1:E5 Chapter 5 (2013) Strategist 2
- Damages S5:E7 The Storm's Moving In (2012) Dr. Lee Collins
- Unforgettale S1:E4 Up in Flames (2011) Isaac Brezner
- Louie (2011) Barry
- The Good Wife S1:E19 Boom (2010) Opposing Lawyer
- The Unusuals S1:E9 Boom (2010) Trenton Willis
- All My Children (2008) Dr. Hathaway
- Law & Order: Criminal Intent S7:E12 (2008) Screenwriter
- New Amsterdam S1:E8 Love Hurts (2008) Bachelor #2
- Law & Order (2008) Marvin Field
- Kidnapped (2007) Dr. Emerson
- Law & Order: Special Victims Unit S6:E16 "Contract" (2005) Assistant M.E. Fielding
- Law & Order (2005) Ari Posner
- Joan of Arcadia S1:E19 Do the Math (2004) Piano Tuner God
- Without a Trace (2003) Scott Mogens
- The Tick S1:E2 The Funeral (2001) Officer Shapiro
- The Agency S1:E4 In Our Own Backyard (2001) Jay Osborne
- Arli$$ (2000) Ozzy Comstock
- Sliders - Please Press One, series 5/6 (1999) as Guy (5579-A - The computer)
- Two Guys, a Girl and a Pizza Place S2:E1, 4, 6, 20 (1998–1999) Karmen
- NYPD Blue S6:E2 Cop in a Bottle (1998) Dr. Edson Robert
- Spy Game S1:E5 (1997) Frankenheimer
- Friends S3:E15, 16 (1997) Isaac
- Just Shoot Me! (1997) Motorcycle messenger
- Star Trek: Voyager S2:E18 – Death Wish (1996) Maury Ginsberg
- Melrose Place (1995) Joe Cohen
- Murder One (1995) Jonathan Miller
- Murphy Brown (1995) Scuz-uncredited

=== Theater ===
- The Underpants (2007) Cohen
- Intimate Apparel (2006) Mr. Marks
- The Cherry Orchard (2001) Petya
- Mizlansky/Zilinsky (2000) Mr. Miles
- Freedomland by Amy Freed (1997) Titus
- The Substance of Fire (1996) Aaron Geldhart
- The Lion in Winter (1994) Richard Lionheart
- Alone Together (1993) Michael Butler
- Persecution and Assassination of Jean-Paul Marat as Performed by the Inmates of the Asylum of Charenton Under the Direction of the Marquis de Sade (1990) Mad Animal
- The Adventures of Huckleberry Finn, Adapted by Steve Lawson, Directed by Kevin Kelley (1990) Jo Harper, Baldy & Turner
- Mother Courage (1989) Young Soldier
- Henry the IV, Parts I & II (1989) Funeral Procession & Francis Feeble
- The Resistible Rise of Arturo Ui (1988) Grocer of Chicago and Cicero
- The American Clock (1988) Bidder & Thief
