= The Only One (Kiyotaka song) =

Single by Kiyotaka (清貴)

from the album I'll Be There
- Released: April 18, 2001
- Genre: J-pop, R&B
- Label: EMI Music Japan
- Songwriters: Kiyotaka; TJ Fisher
- Producer: Hideya Nakazaki

Kiyotaka (清貴) singles chronology
"VANISHING" (2001)	"The Only One" (2001)	"SIGNAL" (2001)

Music video
- "The Only One" on YouTube

"The Only One" is the third single by Japanese singer Kiyotaka for his first studio album, I'll Be There (2001). It was written by Kiyotaka and TJ Fisher. The song was released on April 18, 2001.

== Critical reception ==
CD Journal gave the song a positive review saying "it's like a hymn purifying our hearts".

== Commercial performance ==
In Japan, "The Only One" achieved a big success, charting at No. 12 on the Oricon Weekly Singles Chart and No. 82 on the Oricon Yearly Singles Chart. This song was sold over 400,000 copies so far.

== Usage in media ==
"The Only One" was used in the Japanese drama "Pure Soul ~Kimi ga boku wo wasuretemo~".

== Live performance ==
In 2001, he performed this song on the Japanese popular music program "Music Station" twice.

== Track listing ==
=== Maxi single ===
All lyrics are written by Kiyotaka; all music is composed by TJ Fisher.

No.	Title	Length
1.	"The Only One"
2.	"freedom"
3.	"Lost child"
4.	"The Only One" (Radio Edit)

== Personnel ==
- Kiyotaka – vocals, lyrics, chorus arranger
- TJ Fisher – composer
- Seiki Morisaki – engineer
- Yasuji Maeda – engineer
- Yukie Fuse – engineer (assistant)
- Hideya Nakazaki – producer, engineer

== Charts and certifications ==
=== Weekly charts ===
Chart (2001)	Peak position
Japan Oricon Singles Chart	12

=== Yearly charts ===
Chart (2001)	Peak position
Japan Oricon Singles Chart	82

=== Certifications ===
Region	Certifications	Sales/Shipments
Japan (RIAJ)	Platinum	400,000
