= Sondra James =

American actress (1939–2021)

- Born: Sondra Weil; July 21, 1939; New York City, U.S.
- Died: September 12, 2021 (aged 82); New York City, U.S.
- Occupation: Actor
- Years active: 1990–2021

Sondra James (née Weil; July 21, 1939 – September 12, 2021) was an American sound coordinator and actress.

== Early life ==
Sondra James was born Sondra Weil on July 21, 1939, on the Lower East Side of Manhattan in New York City. She graduated from the Bronx High School of Science in 1955 before taking a double major in anthropology and archaeology at City College of New York.

== Career ==
James began work as an actor, first starring in Mighty Aphrodite in 1995. Following this, she consistently worked as a character actor and voice actress across film, television, and stage, including the national tour of Funny Girl in 1996. In the 1990s, she founded the loop recording company Speakeasy, which provides audio recording for film and television. Within Speakeasy, James took on various sound department roles, including loop coordinator, voice casting, and ADR casting. She was often involved with casting Coen brothers films. As of 2021, the company has provided audio for over 500 films and television shows. James also provided additional voices for several of the productions the company looped. While James and Speakeasy were successful in the 1990s, she was often upset that she struggled to find acting jobs.

James played the main role of Auntie Norma in Karl Pilkington's British comedy Sick of It; the production decided to use an American actress because there were limited elderly British actors, and these would all be recognizable to a British audience, which Pilkington felt would be distracting. He was shown a picture of James and immediately liked the look of her, knowing he didn't want the character to appear mundane.

In 2020, she was one of the group of actors who brought a class-action lawsuit against SAG-AFTRA Health Fund for imposing penalties on performers over 65 in a health plan restructure supposedly helping cover COVID-19.

== Personal life ==
James had two sons, Michael and Marc. She had five grandchildren and two great-grandchildren at the time of her death. She was a fan of the New York Yankees.

== Death ==
James died at her home in New York City on September 12, 2021, aged 82, from lung cancer, which had been diagnosed five months earlier.

== Filmography ==
=== Film ===
Sourced to BFI and TV Guide unless noted

Year	Title	Role	Notes
1982	Muggable Mary: Street Cop	Neighbor Woman	Television film
1992	This Is My Life		Additional voices
1992	Whispers in the Dark		Additional voices
1995	Mighty Aphrodite	Operator; Chorus voices	
2000	Book of Shadows: Blair Witch 2	Actor/Leader	
2000	Cecil B. Demented		Additional voices
2004	Alfie	Mrs. Liberman	
2004	Because of Winn-Dixie		Additional voices
2005	Robots	Additional voices	
2006	The Devil Wears Prada		Additional voices
2006	Everyone's Hero		Additional voices
2008	Marley & Me		Additional voices
2008	Breaking Upwards		
2009	Everybody's Fine		Additional voices
2009	Taking Woodstock	Margaret	
2010	Going the Distance	Elderly Woman	
2010	Wall Street: Money Never Sleeps	Lady at Book Signing	
2011	What's Your Number?		
2011	Top Cat: The Movie		Additional voices
2012	The Dictator	Friendly Customer	
2012	Sleepwalk with Me	Colleen	
2012	Ice Age: Continental Drift		Additional voices
2012	Putzel	Mrs. Hertzel	
2014	America 1979	Mrs. Ambrose	Short film
2014	The Cobbler	Anna Stevens	
2014	Growing Up and Other Lies	Barb	
2016	C Street	Mrs. Plumbcot	
2016	Don't Think Twice	Bonnie	
2016	KikoRiki: Legend of the Golden Dragon	Olga	Voice; animation
2017	Lost Cat Corona	Sal's Mother	
2017	Spider-Man: Homecoming	Marjorie	
2017	Keep the Change	Sarah's Grandma	
2017	Active Adults	Rose	
2018	The Escape of Prisoner 614	Maria	
2018	Lez Bomb		
2018	KikoRiki: Deja Vu	Olga	Voice; animation
2019	Joker	Dr. Sally Friedman	
2019	The Climb	Grandma	
2020	Shiva Baby	Maureen	
2021	Making the Day		
2021	Dating and New York	Real Estate Mogul	
2021	The Tender Bar	Grandma Moehringer	Posthumous release

=== Television ===
Sourced to Deadline and TV Guide unless noted

Year	Title	Role	Notes
1999	Law & Order: Special Victims Unit	Agnes Rosen	episode: "Hysteria"
2000	Sex and the City		
2001	Law & Order		
2003	Squeak!		
2006	Pokémon	Nanny	Voice; animation; episode: "147"
2012	Girls		
2013	Blue Bloods		
2014	Lucky 7		
2014	The Mysteries of Laura		
2016	Crisis in Six Scenes		
2018–2020	Sick of It	Auntie Norma	Main role
2020	What We Do in the Shadows	Joan	Episode: "Brain Scramblies"
	30 Rock		
	Ray Donovan		
	At Home with Amy Sedaris		

=== Commercials ===
Year	Company	Role	Notes
2001	BMW	Backseat Grandma	BMW X5 commercials: "Awkward Grandma", "Moonroof", "Heads Up"

=== Video games ===
Sourced to Anime News Network unless noted

Year	Title	Role
2001	Grand Theft Auto III	Ma Cipriani
2005	Grand Theft Auto: Liberty City Stories	Ma Cipriani

=== Stage ===
Sourced to The Hollywood Reporter unless noted

Year	Title	Notes
1996	Funny Girl	National tour
2002	The Tale of the Allergist's Wife	Tour

=== As sound department ===
==== Film ====
Sourced to BFI unless noted

Year	Title
1990	Green Card
1993	The Night We Never Met
1995	Before and After
1998	Primary Colors
1999	Music of the Heart
1999	Ride with the Devil
1999	The Talented Mr. Ripley
1999	The Best Man
1999	The Deep End of the Ocean
1999	Bowfinger
1999	The Astronaut's Wife
1999	The Sixth Sense
2000	American Psycho
2000	Down to You
2000	O Brother, Where Art Thou?
2000	Mission to Mars
2001	The Man Who Wasn't There
2001	Double Whammy
2001	The Royal Tenenbaums
2002	K-19: The Widowmaker
2002	Two Weeks Notice
2002	Secretary
2002	Murd3r by Numb8rs
2003	Intolerable Cruelty
2004	Secret Window
2004	The Manchurian Candidate
2004	Because of Winn-Dixie
2004	The Stepford Wives
2005	Transamerica
2005	The Notorious Bettie Page
2005	Last Holiday
2005	Prime
2006	A Guide to Recognizing Your Saints
2006	Fur: An Imaginary Portrait of Diane Arbus
2006	World Trade Center
2006	Trust the Man
2006	The Sentinel
2006	Hollywoodland
2006	Failure to Launch
2006	Man of the Year
2006	The Devil Wears Prada
2007	Tenderness
2007	Savage Grace
2007	American Gangster
2007	Grace is Gone
2007	Teeth
2007	Music and Lyrics
2007	Evening
2007	Married Life
2007	Hot Rod
2007	Stop-Loss
2007	Perfect Stranger
2007	The Girl in the Park
2007	Awake
2008	Soul Men
2008	The Reader
2008	Doubt
2008	Carriers
2008	The Happening
2009	Away We Go
2009	Taking Woodstock
2009	Julie & Julia
2009	A Serious Man
2009	Everybody's Fine
2009	Did You Hear About the Morgans?
2010	True Grit
2010	The Bounty Hunter
2010	Dear John
2011	Margaret
2011	The Big Year
2013	Inside Llewyn Davis

==== Television ====
Sourced to Deadline unless noted

Year	Title	Notes
1991–1995	The Heroic Legend of Arslan	
1998–2004	Sex and the City	
2012	Royal Pains	6 episodes
	Bored to Death	
	Boardwalk Empire	
	Smash	
	Damages	
	Nurse Jackie	
