= Brain Scramblies =

- What We Do in the Shadows episode
- Episode no.: Season 2 Episode 3
- Directed by: Kyle Newacheck
- Written by: Jake Bender; Zach Dunn
- Cinematography by: DJ Stipsen
- Editing by: Yana Gorskaya; Daniel Haworth
- Production code: XWS02002
- Original air date: April 22, 2020
- Running time: 24 minutes

Guest appearances
- Craig Robinson as Claude; Marissa Jaret Winokur as Charmaine Rinaldi; Anthony Atamanuik as Sean Rinaldi; Sondra James as Joan

Episode chronology
← Previous "Ghosts"	Next → "The Curse"

"Brain Scramblies" is the third episode of the second season of the American mockumentary comedy horror television series What We Do in the Shadows, set in the franchise of the same name. It is the thirteenth overall episode of the series and was written by Jake Bender and Zach Dunn, and directed by producer Kyle Newacheck. It was released on FX on April 22, 2020.

The series is set in Staten Island, New York City. Like the 2014 film, the series follows the lives of vampires in the city. These consist of three vampires, Nandor, Laszlo, and Nadja. They live alongside Colin Robinson, an energy vampire; and Guillermo, Nandor's familiar. The series explores the absurdity and misfortunes experienced by the vampires. In the episode, the vampires are invited to watch the Super Bowl at their neighbors' house, while Guillermo inadvertently is recruited into an association of vampire hunters.

According to Nielsen Media Research, the episode was seen by an estimated 0.566 million household viewers and gained a 0.22 ratings share among adults aged 18–49. The episode received mostly positive reviews from critics, who praised the absurdist humor, performances and themes.

== Plot ==
The vampires' neighbor Sean (Anthony Atamanuik) invites them to his Super Bowl party. However, the vampires misunderstand the pronunciation as "Superb Owl", despite Guillermo (Harvey Guillén) and Colin Robinson (Mark Proksch) explaining what the real Super Bowl is.

During the party, Sean talks with his friends over Nandor (Kayvan Novak) and Laszlo (Matt Berry), stating that he only sees them at night and jokingly calls them vampires. This alarms Nandor and Laszlo, believing he is genuine. Nadja (Natasia Demetriou) surprisingly gets along with Sean's wife Charmaine (Marissa Jaret Winokur) and her friends. However, Sean's mother Joan (Sondra James) recognizes Nadja as an old friend when she was a kid. Guillermo stays at home, and searches the Internet for virgins in the area for Nandor. He eventually visits the Mosquito Collectors of the Tristate Area. However, he is informed by the member Claude (Craig Robinson) that their club is actually a local vampire hunters meeting. Among the members is Shanice (Veronika Slowikowska), Jenna's college roommate, who is aware of her being a vampire. Guillermo is overwhelmed by the thought of the victims' families, questioning his role in getting them to the vampires.

As Sean shows Laszlo and Nandor his Ocean's Twelve memorabilia, they display their vampiric powers. Realizing he did not really know about their powers, they hypnotize him to forget it. However, Sean ends up forgetting all of his memories, in a process known as "Brain Scramblies" as they over-hypnotized. The vampires consider killing him, but Laszlo refuses to let it happen. Instead, they decide to show him their powers in order to scare him off and try to make him remember. This fails, but Sean is spared when he reunites with his wife. The vampires declare the party a success, although they feel disappointed that no "owl" showed up.

== Production ==
=== Development ===
In March 2020, FX confirmed that the third episode of the season would be titled "Brain Scramblies", and that it would be written by Jake Bender and Zach Dunn, and directed by producer Kyle Newacheck. This was Bender's first writing credit, Dunn's first writing credit, and Newacheck's third directing credit.

== Reception ==
=== Viewers ===
In its original American broadcast, "Brain Scramblies" was seen by an estimated 0.566 million household viewers with a 0.22 in the 18-49 demographics. This means that 0.22 percent of all households with televisions watched the episode. This was a 38% increase in viewership from the previous episode, which was watched by 0.409 million household viewers with a 0.17 in the 18-49 demographics.

With DVR factored in, the episode was watched by 1.09 million viewers with a 0.4 in the 18-49 demographics.

=== Critical reviews ===
"Brain Scramblies" received mostly positive reviews from critics. Katie Rife of The A.V. Club gave the episode a "B+" grade and wrote, "Overall, 'Brain Scramblies' was a nicely balanced episode that made time for both overarching plot and random silliness, digging further into a thematic element I really enjoyed when they explored it in season one: The nuances of the vampires' relationship with humans."

Tony Sokol of Den of Geek gave the episode a 4 star rating out of 5 and wrote, "'Brain Scramblies' is a revelatory episode. The vampires continue to make the epic discoveries in the most mundane of circumstances. Ancient questions are asked again, like why fierce and vicious women marry wet potatoes, and why vibrant men become such lazy sacks of shit after marriage. The ending is surprisingly sweet. The vampires team to do the humane thing, ripping the head off a mind too feeble to notice. But the brain scrambly is largely redundant on the already dim Shaun." Greg Wheeler of The Review Geek gave the episode a 4 star rating out of 5 and wrote, "Nadja definitely steals the show though with her rants and seeing her observe the marriage of the different women and picking them apart is one of the highlights of the episode. Shadows has settled in nicely to its role again this season and if this episode is anything to go by, we're in for some real treats ahead."
