= Citizenship (What We Do in the Shadows) =

- What We Do in the Shadows episode
- Episode no.: Season 1 Episode 8
- Directed by: Jason Woliner
- Written by: Stefani Robinson
- Cinematography by: DJ Stipsen
- Editing by: Joseph Ettinger; Varun Viswanath
- Production code: XWS01007
- Original air date: May 15, 2019
- Running time: 25 minutes

Guest appearances
- Beanie Feldstein as Jenna; Maury Ginsberg as Immigration Officer

Episode chronology
← Previous "The Trial"	Next → "The Orgy"

"Citizenship" is the eighth episode of the first season of the American mockumentary comedy horror television series What We Do in the Shadows, set in the franchise of the same name. The episode was written by co-executive producer Stefani Robinson, and directed by Jason Woliner. It was released on FX on May 15, 2019.

The series is set in Staten Island, New York City. Like the 2014 film, the series follows the lives of vampires in the city. These consist of three vampires, Nandor, Laszlo, and Nadja. They live alongside Colin Robinson, an energy vampire; and Guillermo, Nandor's familiar. The series explores the absurdity and misfortunes experienced by the vampires. In the episode, Nandor tries to obtain American citizenship after discovering his country has been dissolved, while Nadja tries to help Jenna in her transition to vampire.

According to Nielsen Media Research, the episode was seen by an estimated 0.522 million household viewers and gained a 0.19 ratings share among adults aged 18–49. The episode received positive reviews, who praised the storylines and humor.

== Plot ==
Jenna (Beanie Feldstein) continues her transformation into a vampire, which is now affecting her exposure to sunlight. Noticing her struggles in controlling her powers, Nadja (Natasia Demetriou) decides to guide her, as she had no one to teach her when she turned into a vampire.

During an argument with the vampires, Colin Robinson (Mark Proksch) finds that Nandor (Kayvan Novak) was the ruler of an old country known as Al Quolanudar, which dissolved in 1401. This affects Nandor's concentration when hunting victims to eat. Guillermo (Harvey Guillén) motivates him to apply for the American citizenship, helping him in the process. However, Guillermo gets frustrated when he discovers that Jenna was turned into a vampire, who is also helped by Laszlo (Matt Berry). At the United States Citizenship and Immigration Services office, Nandor tries to hypnotize the officer (Maury Ginsberg) to easily get it, but discovers that it does not work for the employees due to their "dead souls." Nandor fails to correctly answer any question. When reciting the Oath of Allegiance, Nandor's mouth catches fire when he says "God", causing him to storm off the office. Guillermo tells him he should not worry about failing, as he is still a vampire, motivating Nandor.

Nadja takes Jenna to a college party, where Jenna once again fails to use her powers. She then inadvertedly turns invisible and causes chaos in the party, surprising Nadja. She uses her newfound powers to stalk and kill a boy who humiliated her, delighting her. However, she is disappointed when she is informed that she can never see the sun again or she will instantly die. Wanting to see the sunrise, Jenna suggests they use motorcycle helmets to protect them. However, the helmets do not work and they quickly enter into the house.

== Production ==
=== Development ===
In April 2019, FX confirmed that the eighth episode of the season would be titled "Citizenship", and that it would be written by co-executive producer Stefani Robinson, and directed by Jason Woliner. This was Robinson's first writing credit, and Woliner's first directing credit.

== Reception ==
=== Viewers ===
In its original American broadcast, "Citizenship" was seen by an estimated 0.522 million household viewers with a 0.19 in the 18-49 demographics. This means that 0.19 percent of all households with televisions watched the episode. This was a slight decrease in viewership from the previous episode, which was watched by 0.527 million household viewers with a 0.22 in the 18-49 demographics.

With DVR factored in, the episode was watched by 1.16 million viewers with a 0.5 in the 18-49 demographics.

=== Critical reviews ===
"Citizenship" received positive reviews from critics. Katie Rife of The A.V. Club gave the episode a "B" grade and wrote, "As well as revealing Nandor's love of the Dream Team and personal 'dunk zone', this week brought back two dangling storylines from the pre-Baron, pre-trial era, namely newbie vampire Jenna and the perpetually downtrodden Guillermo's irritation over not being turned into a vampire. This week, the former fed the latter, after Nadja decides it's time to take her stupid little baby under her bat wing and teach her the facts of vampire life. The parallels between vampirism and puberty in this episode were explicit but not overbearing, with Nadja as the doting vampire mom and Jenna as the awkward vampire teen."

Tony Sokol of Den of Geek gave the episode a 4.5 star rating out of 5 and wrote, "Guillermo has a very interesting arc this episode. He is obviously hurt over learning that Jenna has been made into a vampire, a random thing that bugs him no end, and he winds up being both insubordinate and inspiring to Nandor. 'Citizenship' is an inspired and fun episode as the two tales of transience play out against each other." Greg Wheeler of The Review Geek gave the episode a 4 star rating out of 5 and wrote, "Once again, What We Do In The Shadows continues to surprise and impress. The characterization is strong, with a good dose of lore and clever jokes peppered throughout the episode. There's some cheeky remarks toward the ongoing gun licence issue here too that may ruffle a few feathers but generally works well within the context of the episode. Despite that, it's hard to fault Shadows which delivers another very good 23 minutes of dramatic comedy."
