= Resurrection (What We Do in the Shadows) =

- What We Do in the Shadows episode
- Episode no.: Season 2 Episode 1
- Directed by: Kyle Newacheck
- Written by: Maika Sawyer
- Cinematography by: DJ Stipsen
- Editing by: Yana Gorskaya; Dane McMaster
- Production code: XWS02001
- Original air date: April 15, 2020
- Running time: 23 minutes

Guest appearances
- Haley Joel Osment as Topher; Benedict Wong as Wallace

Episode chronology
← Previous "Ancestry"	Next → "Ghosts"

"Resurrection" is the first episode of the second season of the American mockumentary comedy horror television series What We Do in the Shadows, set in the franchise of the same name. It is the eleventh overall episode of the series and was written by consulting producer Marika Sawyer, and directed by producer Kyle Newacheck. It was released on FX on April 15, 2020, airing back-to-back with the follow-up episode, "Ghosts".

The series is set in Staten Island, New York City. Like the 2014 film, the series follows the lives of vampires in the city. These consist of three vampires, Nandor, Laszlo, and Nadja. They live alongside Colin Robinson, an energy vampire; and Guillermo, Nandor's familiar. The series explores the absurdity and misfortunes experienced by the vampires. In the episode, Laszlo and Nadja find a familiar, Topher, who now works as a servant for them. When he dies, they ask a necromancer to revive him.

According to Nielsen Media Research, the episode was seen by an estimated 0.537 million household viewers and gained a 0.22 ratings share among adults aged 18–49. The episode received critical acclaim, with critics praising the humor, character development and performances, particularly guest star Haley Joel Osment.

== Plot ==
During the summer, Laszlo (Matt Berry) and Nadja (Natasia Demetriou) have found many familiars, all of which die under unfortunate circumstances. Unbeknownst to the vampires, members of the Vampiric Council have tried to kill them for the Baron's death, all of which are killed by Guillermo (Harvey Guillén). Guillermo has not revealed this to Nandor (Kayvan Novak), as he fears he will kill him.

After many deaths, Laszlo and Nandor have finally found their latest familiar, Topher (Haley Joel Osment). While they view him as a dedicated servant, he actually is a slacker who only works when they are nearby. He also privately shares with Guillermo that he is not interested in becoming a vampire, frustrating Guillermo. While Guillermo scolds him outside for his reckless behavior, Topher accidentally touches the koi pond, which was electrocuted due to a heater, dying immediately. Refusing to abandon their familiar, Nadja and Laszlo bring the corpse with Wallace (Benedict Wong), a necromancer. Wallace performs a ritual and claims that Topher will be resurrected the following day.

Topher returns to life, but as an aggressive zombie, although the vampires do not view him as such. As the sole mortal in the house, Guillermo is often chased by Topher. Despite his attempts at fending him off, Topher still does not die and tries to attack Guillermo. Topher almost kills Guillermo by drowning him on the koi pond, until Nandor stops him. They take Topher back to Wallace, who agrees to keep him free of charge, and allows them to get a free license plate key chain from the entrance. He then locks Topher in the basement, which turns out to be a workshop filled with zombies working on key chains.

== Production ==
=== Development ===
In March 2020, FX confirmed that the first episode of the season would be titled "Resurrection", and that it would be written by consulting producer Marika Sawyer, and directed by producer Kyle Newacheck. This was Sawyer's second writing credit, and Newacheck's first directing credit.

=== Casting ===
In February 2020, it was reported that Haley Joel Osment would guest star in the premiere. The episode also included a guest appearance by Benedict Wong as Wallace, a necromancer.

== Reception ==
=== Viewers ===
In its original American broadcast, "Resurrection" was seen by an estimated 0.537 million household viewers with a 0.22 in the 18-49 demographics. This means that 0.22 percent of all households with televisions watched the episode. This was a 25% increase in viewership from the previous episode, which was watched by 0.427 million household viewers with a 0.17 in the 18-49 demographics.

With DVR factored in, the episode was watched by 1.08 million viewers with a 0.4 in the 18-49 demographics.

=== Critical reviews ===
"Resurrection" received critical acclaim. Katie Rife of The A.V. Club gave the episode an "A" grade and wrote, "This episode was more modest in its ambitions than that season-one highlight, but I found its writing and performances to be just as excellent. If this season follows the same pattern as the last one, Guillermo's destiny should function as a loose through line in the same way the Baron's death did in season one. He does seem to be sprouting a little bit of a backbone; perhaps the Summer of Guillermo is still to come."

Tony Sokol of Den of Geek gave the episode a 4.5 star rating out of 5 and wrote, "'Resurrection' is a great way to bring the vampires back for What We Do in the Shadows season 2. It is how all vampires are born, and subtly nudges the mythology of the undead past the dreaded garlic of TV cancellations. The episode moves very quickly as the pace of the laughs remains as relentless as Nandor." Greg Wheeler of The Review Geek gave the episode a 4 star rating out of 5 and wrote, "With some hilarious scenes involving the necromancer and a lot of well written jokes peppered throughout, What We Do In The Shadows picks up where it left off last season and continues to deliver the same style of humour alongside its imaginative stories. With a new arc for Guillermo to follow and lots of potential for the season ahead, Shadows bows out it first episode on a high."
