= Sinbad (TV series) =

British television series

- Genre: Action/Adventure; Fantasy; Family saga
- Written by: James Dormer; Jack Lothian; Steve Thompson; Harriet Warner; Neil Biswas; Jack Thorne; Richard Kurti; Bev Doyle
- Directed by: Brian Grant; Colin Teague; Andy Wilson
- Starring: Elliot Knight; Naveen Andrews; Dimitri Leonidas; Marama Corlett; Elliot Cowan; Estella Daniels; Junix Inocian; Tuppence Middleton; Orla Brady
- Country of origin: United Kingdom
- Original language: English
- No. of series: 1
- No. of episodes: 12

Production
- Executive producers: Danielle Brandon; Sophie Gardiner; Tim Haines; Anne Mensah; Elwen Rowlands; Andrew Woodhead
- Producers: Donal Geraghty; Grainne Marmion; Andrew Wood
- Running time: 40–45 minutes
- Production company: Impossible Pictures

Original release
- Network: Sky1
- Release: 8 July – 23 September 2012

Sinbad is a British action-adventure fantasy family saga television series that aired on Sky1 from 8 July to 23 September 2012. It was produced by Impossible Pictures, who previously made Walking with Dinosaurs and Primeval. The series stars Elliot Knight as the eponymous hero Sinbad.

On 27 February 2013, Sky announced that they had axed the show, saying its "story has now been told".

== Premise ==
In Basra, streetwise thief Sinbad accidentally kills the son of the powerful Lord Akbari in a fist fight. As recompense for the blood debt, Sinbad's brother is killed in front of his eyes. Sinbad escapes, but his grandmother uses a magic talisman to curse him for the death of his brother. The curse prevents Sinbad from staying on land for more than one day; if he tarries the talisman will choke him to death. This prohibition against remaining on land leads to Sinbad fleeing to a life of adventure at sea onboard the 'Providence'. As Sinbad faces down monsters and wonders, he is unaware that he is still being hunted by Lord Akbari and his servant the witch Taryn, who does not consider Sinbad's brother's death as sufficient payment of the blood debt.

== Cast and characters ==
Actor/Actress	Character	Episodes
Elliot Knight	Sinbad	1–12
Dimitri Leonidas	Anwar	1–12
Marama Corlett	Rina	1–12
Elliot Cowan	Gunnar	1–12
Junix Inocian	Cook	1–12
Janet Suzman	Sinbad's Grandmother	1–2, 6-7
Estella Daniels	Nala	1–7
Tuppence Middleton	Tiger	9–12
Orla Brady	Taryn	1–7, 11–12
Naveen Andrews	Lord Akbari	1–7
Yigal Naor	Emir	1–2, 4, 6
Robert Gilbert	Tazeem	1–2, 5, 7
Devon Anderson	Jamil	1, 12
Sophie Okonedo	Razia	2
Timothy Spall	Anicetus	4
Nikki Amuka-Bird	The Professor	10
Dougray Scott	Father La Stessa	11
Mathew Horne	Philippe	11
Evanna Lynch	Alehna	12

== Episodes ==
No.	Title	Directed by	Written by	Original release date	UK viewers (millions)
1	"Pilot"	Andy Wilson	Jack Lothian	8 July 2012	1.91
In the city of Basra, Sinbad (Knight) is in a fighting ring with a young man who turns out to be the son of Lord Akbari (Andrews). When the fight results in the son's death, both Sinbad and his brother Jamil (Anderson) are captured by Akbari, who orders the death of Jamil in revenge, though Akbari admits that his blood debt would not be satisfied even if he also killed Sinbad. After Sinbad escapes, his grandmother (Janet Suzman) curses him with an amulet, which will exile him at sea; if he is to spend more than one day and night on land, he will die. He stows away on board a vessel, the Providence, but during the night the ship is terrorised by sea demons, and a storm kills all but a handful of the crew and passengers, who include the imposing northman Gunnar (Cowen), thief and fellow stowaway Rina (Corlett), wealthy African beauty Nala (Daniels), ship's doctor Anwar (Leonidas), and the Cook (Inocian).
2	"Queen of the Water-Thieves"	Andy Wilson	James Dormer	15 July 2012	1.46
Akbari organises for the manhunt of Sinbad and enlists the help of sorceress Taryn (Brady). Meanwhile, the Providence is hijacked by a feral tribe known as the "Water Thieves", who capture the crew and send them to their island, once home to a flourishing civilisation, now a ruined city, They are brought before their queen Razia (Okonedo), who takes Sinbad as her lover. He learns from her son that he will die, just like her past lovers. Meanwhile, Razia organises for her people to feast on the other crew members. Just before his amulet can kill him, Sinbad manages to organise his group's escape from the island, with the help of a monstrous bird Razia had kept captive. During the escape, Razia's son dies at the hands of one of the thieves. The ship's chef, who hid below deck, manages to kill the Water-Thieves on board before their ship escapes the island, just as Razia is about to fight her son's killer.
3	"House of Games"	Brian Grant	Steve Thompson	22 July 2012	1.32
The crew ask merchant Abdul Fahim for food and water on their travels, but instead Fahim tricks Anwar into taking the Providence. In order to take it back before the amulet will kill Sinbad, they enter an underground realm to a gambling den. Sinbad manages to win the ship back, but the group quickly find that the owners Essam and Faris (both played by Iain McKee) are imprisoning them, and gambling with their lives. When they learn of Sinbad's curse, they challenge him to find and free his friends and leave the island by sunrise, and Sinbad succeeds. When the owners argue whether he can leave, Rina helps Sinbad escape in time. In the meantime, Taryn makes a potion that enables her to see Sinbad. When Akbari tries the potion, he fails to see Sinbad since Sinbad's group are at the gambling den, protected by a magical barrier. Angered, Akbari banishes Taryn from the city.
4	"Old Man of the Sea"	Andy Wilson	James Dormer	29 July 2012	1.15
The Providence is stranded at sea with low water supplies and the Cook is severely dehydrated. They find a ship and rescue the lone survivor Anicetus (Spall), who Nala appears to recognise. Since Anicetus' boarding, everybody begins to experience hallucinations. Anwar later realises that Anicetus is the personification of Death; he has come to reclaim Nala as his bride as part of a deal he made with her people, and in return for the resurrection of her deceased father. However, Nala realises that Death has no knowledge of her grief, and breaks his hold of her. Following Death's defeat, it rains, replenishing the water supply. Meanwhile, Taryn convinces Akbari that she knows where Sinbad is heading next.
5	"Hunted"	Brian Grant	Jack Lothian	5 August 2012	1.00
During a short excursion, Sinbad and crew are being hunted by Basra guards. Anwar, Nala and Rina make their way back the Providence, only to be captured. When Taryn learns of Sinbad's curse, she creates a "Familiar", a being that can detect Sinbad's location and emotions. Meanwhile, Gunnar and Sinbad make their own way, where Gunnar is captured by a band of warriors known as the Khaima. The leader Obsidian (Carsten Norgaard) sentences him to death for his past as a barbaric Viking warrior. As Sinbad intervenes, the Familiar tracks Sinbad down, and now that Taryn has lost control, the creature will now kill Sinbad. Gunnar convinces Obsidian to let him go to save Sinbad. Gunnar manages to convince Sinbad that it can be defeated by mastering his anger. Obsidian decides to pardon Gunnar for his selflessness, and offers him a place among the Khaima, but he declines. Anwar, the Cook, Nala and Rina escape, overpower the guards, and release Taryn, who manages to see Sinbad's future where the Providence arrives at an abandoned city and encounters a young woman Taryn seems to recognise.
6	"The Siren"	Brian Grant	Harriet Warner	12 August 2012	1.00
While investigating possible damage to the ship, Sinbad is lost at sea, only to be rescued on a nearby island by a woman named Roisin (Georgia King). Nala and Gunnar discover he is alive, but does not want to leave. It is revealed that Roisin is a creature taking human form and has taken away his memories, including those of his grandmother, thereby lifting the curse. When the Cook learns about Roisin's secret, Anwar and Rina return to the island and track Roisin and Sinbad to a temple. There Rina defeats Roisin by overpowering her with a bad memory where she was sold to slavery by her parents. Sinbad's memories return, bringing back the curse. In Basra, Sinbad's grandmother is captured. Akbari kills his older brother the Emir (Yigal Naor) after he attempts to banish Akbari for keeping Taryn. Taryn then uses a spell sending Sinbad a request for help from his grandmother.
7	"Homecoming"	Andy Wilson	Neil Biswas & Jack Lothian	19 August 2012	1.07
Sinbad returns to Basra to rescue his grandmother from danger. Upon arrival the group learn that Akbari has come to power in Basra, after murdering his brother, and is destroying all forms of scientific knowledge in favour of sorcery. Anwar and Rina attempt to rescue the former's father, only to realise that Akbari already paid them off and has Rina arrested, though she later escapes. Meanwhile, Sinbad enlists the help of Tazeem (Robert Gilbert), a Basra guard and childhood friend. Taryn summons an ancient shadow creature, which captures Nala and Gunnar. Sinbad finds his grandmother trapped by a magic field, but the amulet prevents him from approaching her. She warns Sinbad that it is in fact Taryn he needs to hide from. Sinbad and Akbari fight, however Sinbad apologizes for his son's death, and forgives him for killing Jamil, which lifts the curse for good. Taryn kills Akbari after he also forgives Sinbad, and tells him that, though he always believe her to be his servant, he was in fact serving her. Sinbad's grandmother escapes the magic field, destroying the magic rune controlling the shadow creature, but dies in the process. Both Taryn and his grandmother admit there is a secret about Sinbad. Now they are free, the crew of the Providence decide to continue in their adventures. Nala however chooses to remain behind.
8	"Kuji"	Colin Teague	Jack Thorne	26 August 2012	1.14
On his birthday, a depressed Anwar begins to have doubts about his place in the group. Meanwhile, the Providence crew do a spot of treasure hunting on a deserted island filled with ship wrecks. They find a box, which opens to reveal a young woman named Kuji (Hannah Tointon), who claims to be a deity. After spending the night on the island, they realise that it is inhabited after finding themselves surrounded by an army of warriors, who threaten to kill them unless they hand over Kuji. When they refuse, the army kill all apart from Anwar, who refuses to leave her behind. Kuji then reveals that the entire event is a test of Anwar's bravery and role within the group. Feeling that he succeeded, she resurrects the group and leaves.
9	"Eye of the Tiger"	Colin Teague	Jack Lothian & James Dormer	2 September 2012	0.93
Sinbad sets out to find a magical stone that reveals the future in order to discover more about his destiny. The group encounter Riff (Lee Ingleby), a bitter young lad who also desperately desires the stone for himself. As his father, the Grandmaster of the stone, forbids him from using it, believing his son far from ready and insufficiently evolved to do so. Riff agrees to help them steal it. However, once they reach the chamber where the stone's kept, they are caught by the Grandmaster, who immediately has Sinbad put to death due to recognising him as being his killer from a previous vision. Riff convinces his father he wants to prove himself by being the one to execute Sinbad, then goes on to poison Sinbad. Although we later find that the poisoning was just a ruse organised by Tiger (Tuppence Middleton) - a bounty hunter sent by Taryn to return Sinbad to Basra. And just as he discovers he's still alive, Tiger places a necklace-lock around his neck, which will kill him if he attempts to escape from her. However, Sinbad realises that Tiger is to keep him alive at all costs, and convinces her to allow him to find the stone first, and then he will go with her freely. Riff later tricks his father into entering the stone's labyrinth, and instead lands up killing him in a similar condition to his father's vision. Once Sinbad has the stone instead of consulting it he decides to rather destroy it, but is shown multiple visions of the future as it shatters into shards. Aboard the ship Sinbad reveals to Cook his visions of an abandoned city, and his brother Jamil with him. The Cook tells Sinbad it must've been a vision of the 'Land of the Dead' and it seems he's being directed to go there. Sinbad convinces Tiger to abandon Taryn's bidding and rather join their little group.
10	"For Whom the Egg Shatters"	Colin Teague	Richard Kurti & Bev Doyle	9 September 2012	0.94
Tiger has secured a deal to transport a professor (Nikki Amuka-Bird) and a giant egg to an uninhabited island for experimentation in eradicating a rat-based plague. However, en route the egg hatches during the middle of the night, and the large snake-like creature from that egg is loose on board the Providence. They learn the serpent is growing, and requires a human to feed on. The professor loses an arm from an attack before she is saved. Anwar learns that the professor worked with a radical scientist. The crew decide to lure out the creature before it gets too big. After the professor willfully allows the creature to feed on her, Anwar realizes she found a way to merge herself with the serpent. The Cook realizes the professor is allergic to nuts, so Sinbad fires a nut paste-tipped arrow at the serpent, killing it.
11	"Fiend or Friend?"	M. T. Adler	Harriet Warner	16 September 2012	0.94
The Providence crew make their way to a monastery to find Tiger's friend, Brother Angelico, who supposedly has the map to the Land of the Dead. However Angelico reveals there is no map, as no map could ever hold that land. Gunnar, wanting no further part in the quest, decides to leave and become a silk merchant instead, where he falls for a widow named Lara (Miranda Raison). However, the group learn that the island is being terrorised by a beast known as The Fiend. Gunnar is captured, accused of being The Fiend by Father La Stessa (Dougray Scott). Sinbad offers to find the real Fiend by nightfall, or if he fails La Stessa's congregation can then go ahead and execute Gunnar. They discover that the local bartender, Philippe (Mathew Horne) is in fact The Fiend, just as Lara realizes that La Stessa is controlling it. Sinbad tricks it into killing La Stessa instead, and the crew convince the lucid bartender how he might control his transformations in future. Meanwhile, Taryn poses as a nun to ask Angelico for the direction to the Land of the Dead. When he still refuses, she kills him. Tiger finds that the map does indeed exist, after the moonlight reveals a glistening map on the flagstones, on the floor outside the monastery. However, Taryn manages to merge herself into Tiger, unbeknownst to the rest of the group.
12	"Land of the Dead"	Michael Offer	Jack Lothian	23 September 2012	0.87
On their way to the Land of the Dead, flashbacks reveal Taryn's motive in finding the lost city; to recover her daughter Alehna (Evanna Lynch). The Providence arrives at the land after being caught by a whirlpool. The crew enter an abandoned underground city, where Sinbad discovers the area is patrolled by gigantic Guardians, one of which latches on to him. Meanwhile, Gunnar realises Tiger's strange behaviour, and manages to separate her from Taryn. He then finds Sinbad and manages to break the Guardian's hold on him. However his consciousness is trapped in a limbo-like state, where he encounters his crew mates who have no recollection of him, even Jamil. Taryn manages to send him back to life. She reveals that Sinbad is both alive and dead in the Land, and is the only person who can make his way to the city. The crew find Jamil, and they go into hiding until the Guardians calm down. Taryn also finds Alehna in a library, who reveals that Sinbad previously went to the land as an infant before his father freed him. As hounds surround the library, Anwar finds a hidden exit. However, to ensure the group's escape, Jamil sacrifices himself to a Guardian. As the group feast, Anwar convinces Sinbad to continue. As he says goodbye to his brother, it is revealed that Alehna is possessed by some form of darkness that she brought back with her into the land of the living.

== Production ==
In August 2010, the Sky1 director of programmes Stuart Murphy announced the commission of several new television series, including a 12-part multimillion-pound Sinbad the Sailor adaptation in August 2010, with Impossible Pictures, a production company known for producing the ITV science fiction series Primeval, on board to produce the show. The announcement was made as Murphy wanted to shed Sky's reputation for broadcasting primarily foreign imports and "shifting the budget" to put "terrestrial levels of spend" behind the shows. The series was also intended to have "the ambition of Lost and the pace of 24". Filming began in Malta in February 2011.

== Broadcast ==
The series was originally set to air during Autumn 2011, however, for unknown reasons, the series was delayed until the following summer. The series began broadcast on Sky1 weekly from 8 July 2012 during the 7:00pm time slot.

== Reception ==
=== Ratings ===
The first episode received overnight ratings of 1.06 million viewers, and an audience share 4.7 percent. Peaking at 1.25 million at one point, it became the highest-rated pay television programme for the night. The first episode saw significant gains according to the final consolidated ratings, averaging 1.91 million viewers. However, over the following weeks ratings saw a gradual decline.

=== Critical ===
On the review aggregator website Rotten Tomatoes, 68% of 19 critics' reviews are positive, with an average rating of 5.40/10. The website's consensus reads, 'Sinbad has the swashbuckling adventure to liven up Arabian Nights at home, although the sailor's adventures can be often teeter from thrilling into corny.' Allison Keene of The Hollywood Reporter commended the 'fast-paced editing and snappy dialogue', and praised the diversity of the cast.

== International broadcasters ==
Sinbad has also been sold to networks around the world from BBC Worldwide. In France, premium pay channel Canal+ pre-bought the rights to air the series in February 2012. Bell Media, a Canadian broadcaster, bought Sinbad and showed it on their Space channel. Nine Network also bought the rights to air the series in Australia. However, the BBC later took back the rights from Nine and sold it to the Australian Broadcasting Corporation instead, premiering on 8 September 2012. Syfy has picked up the series in the United States. In Italy, state-owned network RAI broadcast the show in its original version, also displaying English subtitles in order to help viewers familiarise with the foreign language.

Country	Network
Australia	Nine Network; ABC1
Balkans	Fox
Canada	Space
Quebec	Historia
Egypt	MBC MASR
France	Canal+
Germany	Super RTL; RTL Crime
Hong Kong	TVB Pearl
Indonesia	Kompas TV
Italy	Rai Scuola
South Korea	KBS2
Malaysia	ntv7
Russia	TV3
Sri Lanka	Hiru TV
Turkey	star tv CNBC-e e2
United States	Syfy
Kenya	Kenya Television Network

== Home media ==
The series was released on DVD & Blu-ray in the United Kingdom on 22 October 2012 and in the United States on 3 September 2013.
