= The One and Only =

The One and Only or One and Only may refer to:

== Film and television ==
- The One and Only (1978 film), an American film directed by Carl Reiner
- The One and Only (1999 film), a Danish film directed by Susanne Bier
- The One and Only (2002 film), a British film directed by Simon Cellan Jones
- One and Only (film), a 2023 Chinese comedy film
- The One and Only (TV programme), a British television special series from 2012 to 2015
- The One and Only (British TV series), a 2008 British TV talent show for tribute acts
- The One and Only (South Korean TV series), a 2021 South Korean television series

== Music ==
=== Albums ===
- The One and Only (Lefty Frizzell album), 1959
- The One and Only (Waylon Jennings album), 1967
- The One and Only (Gladys Knight & the Pips album), 1978
- The One and Only (Plankeye album), 1997
- The One & Only (Jo Stafford album), 1997
- The One and Only (Kirsty MacColl album), 2001 compilation album
- The One and Only (Lil Wyte album), 2007
- One and Only (Miho Nakayama album), 1987
- One and Only (Big Daddy Weave album), 2002
- The One and Only, the American title of Chesney Hawkes 1991 album Buddy's Song
- The One and Only, a 1983 posthumously released album by Billy Fury
- One and Only, a 2024 album by Anvil

=== Songs ===
- "The One and Only", a song by Kasey Cisyk from the film 1978 The One and Only
- "The One and Only" (song), a 1991 song written by Nik Kershaw and recorded by Chesney Hawkes
- "The One and Only", a song by Snoop Dogg from his 2002 album Paid tha Cost to Be da Boss
- "One and Only", a song by Queensrÿche on their album Empire (1990)
- "One and Only", a song by Kruder & Dorfmeister from the album Conversions: A K&D Selection (1996)
- "One and Only", a song mixed by Turin Brakes featuring Gillian Welch on the album Late Night Tales: Turin Brakes (2004)
- "One and Only", a song by Mariah Carey from The Emancipation of Mimi (2005)
- "One and Only", a song by Barenaked Ladies from their albums Barenaked Ladies Are Me (2006) and Barenaked Ladies Are Men (2007)
- "One and Only", a song by Timbaland with Fall Out Boy from the Timbaland album Shock Value (2007) and the Fall Out Boy album Live in Phoenix (2008)
- "One and Only", a song by Nelly from Brass Knuckles (2008)
- "One and Only", a song by Adele on her album 21 (2011)
- "One and Only", a song by Rend Collective on their album As Family We Go (2015)
- "One and Only", a song by Band-Maid on their album World Domination (2018)
- "One and Only (My Boo)", a song by DJ Kay Slay and Greg Street on their album The Champions: North Meets South (2006)
- "One & Only", a song by Deep Obsession from Infinity (1999)
- "One & Only", a song by The Rasmus from Into (2001)
- "Tsumetai Kaze to Kataomoi / Endless Sky / One and Only", a J-pop song by Morning Musume '15 (2015)
- "One and Only", a song by Enhypen for a collaboration with Pokémon (2023)
- "One and Only", a song by BoyNextDoor on their single album Who! and later reprised on their EP Why.. (2023)

== Others ==
- The One and Only, a novel by Emily Giffin
- One and Only (horse), Japanese Thoroughbred racehorse and sire

== See also ==
- My One and Only (disambiguation)
- The Only One (disambiguation)
