= Ancestry (What We Do in the Shadows) =

- What We Do in the Shadows episode
- Episode no.: Season 1 Episode 10
- Directed by: Taika Waititi
- Written by: Jemaine Clement; Stefani Robinson; Tom Scharpling; Paul Simms
- Cinematography by: DJ Stipsen
- Editing by: Yana Gorskaya; Shawn Paper
- Production code: XWS01010
- Original air date: May 29, 2019
- Running time: 23 minutes

Guest appearances
- Jake McDorman as Gregor; Doug Jones as Baron Afanas

Episode chronology
← Previous "The Orgy"	Next → "Resurrection"

"Ancestry" is the tenth episode and season finale of the first season of the American mockumentary comedy horror television series What We Do in the Shadows, set in the franchise of the same name. The episode was written by series creator Jemaine Clement, co-executive producer Stefani Robinson, co-executive producer Tom Scharpling, and executive producer Paul Simms, and directed by executive producer Taika Waititi. It was released on FX on May 29, 2019.

The series is set in Staten Island, New York City. Like the 2014 film, the series follows the lives of vampires in the city. These consist of three vampires, Nandor, Laszlo, and Nadja. They live alongside Colin Robinson, an energy vampire; and Guillermo, Nandor's familiar. The series explores the absurdity and misfortunes experienced by the vampires. In the episode, Nandor learns about a living descendant that lives nearby, while Guillermo discovers a disturbing connection through his family.

According to Nielsen Media Research, the episode was seen by an estimated 0.427 million household viewers and gained a 0.17 ratings share among adults aged 18–49. The episode received extremely positive reviews, who praised the performances, humor, dark tone and Guillermo's character development.

== Plot ==
Guillermo (Harvey Guillén) questions his role as a familiar, wondering about his true lineage. He tells Nandor (Kayvan Novak) that he had his DNA tested. He shows him that Nandor's test shows that he has 200,000 living descendants, with one of them living in Staten Island. Nandor shares his excitement, but Laszlo (Matt Berry) and Nadja (Natasia Demetriou) are not interested in knowing about their descendants.

Guillermo also sees his DNA, which reveals that he is a descendant of vampire killer Abraham Van Helsing. Guillermo is concerned about the connection, as he previously killed vampires in past encounters. He and Colin Robinson (Mark Proksch) accompany Nandor to visit his descendant, a 94-year-old woman named Madeline. Despite Colin Robinson's warning, Nandor decides to approach her by floating outside her window, causing her to die of a heart attack. Nadja laments her time with Gregor (Jake McDorman), as he was always decapitated in each life, and sings a song. The song reaches Gregor, who is being kept at a psychiatric facility in Poughkeepsie. Hearing Nadja's voice, he breaks free from his constraints and escapes the facility on a car.

Per Nandor's insistence, the vampires attend Madeline's funeral. However, as the service is held at a church, the vampires feel burned when they enter. The rest of the vampires leave due to the pain, while Nandor chooses to stay. When he asks Guillermo for water to ease the pain, Guillermo throws holy water, causing the burn to extend, worrying him if he tried to kill Nandor. Gregor shows up at the vampires' house, to Nadja's surprise and Laszlo's jealousy. Laszlo reveals that he is aware of Gregor, revealing that he killed Gregor in each of his lives. Nadja professes her love for Laszlo, convincing him to spare Gregor. While Laszlo shows Nadja a topiary bush he made of her, Gregor leaves on a motorbike, only to be decapitated by a metal wire that was strung across the bush. As he gets Nandor to sleep, Guillermo does not disclose his true lineage. Nandor tells him that because of the holy water incident, he will be his familiar for one more year. Guillermo leaves and throws wooden stakes, all of which manage to hit directly into portraits of the vampires, disturbing him.

== Production ==
=== Development ===
In April 2019, FX confirmed that the tenth episode of the season would be titled "Ancestry", and that it would be written by series creator Jemaine Clement, co-executive producer Stefani Robinson, co-executive producer Tom Scharpling, and executive producer Paul Simms, and directed by executive producer Taika Waititi. This was Clement's third writing credit, Robinson's second writing credit, Scharpling's second writing credit, Simms' second writing credit, and Waititi's third directing credit.

=== Writing ===
Commenting on Guillermo's lineage, Stefani Robinson said, "It's one of those delicious plot moments where you have someone who's so subservient and low status, elevated to higher status and he's grappling with that. It was one of the things early on that we really sparked to and ended up feeling right for the end of the show. And then in the episode preceding that, it's baked in — whether on purpose or not on purpose, we realize he's maybe destined to kill everybody."

== Reception ==
=== Viewers ===
In its original American broadcast, "Ancestry" was seen by an estimated 0.427 million household viewers with a 0.17 in the 18-49 demographics. This means that 0.17 percent of all households with televisions watched the episode. This was a slight decrease in viewership from the previous episode, which was watched by 0.434 million household viewers with a 0.18 in the 18-49 demographics.

With DVR factored in, the episode was watched by 1.10 million viewers with a 0.5 in the 18-49 demographics.

=== Critical reviews ===
"Ancestry" received extremely positive reviews from critics. Katie Rife of The A.V. Club gave the episode a "B+" grade and wrote, "With four credited writers on this episode, I was worried that 'Ancestry' would be a bit of a mess. But although this was more of a character development episode than a joke-a-minute episode, it didn't have the overstuffed quality that you often see in blockbuster movies written by committee. Credit for this presumably goes to Taika Waititi, who returned to direct the season finale and couldn't be ham-handed if he tried."

Tony Sokol of Den of Geek gave the episode a 4.5 star rating out of 5 and wrote, "What We Do in the Shadows season 1 kept itself from bleeding out and moves forward with a new infusion as vampires and humans both accept the debt the owe their 'Ancestry.'" Greg Wheeler of The Review Geek gave the episode a 4 star rating out of 5 and wrote, "Embracing it's [sic] mockumentary format, What We Do In The Shadows has been a thoroughly entertaining watch over the past few months. The episodes have constantly reinvented themselves, with enough plot twists and character revelations to prevent this from growing stale. Thanks to the series creators, Shadows has been one of the better comedic efforts this year and one of the few I'm looking forward to sinking my teeth into a second season. The show ends as it began – with a well written slice of comedy and reminder there's still life in this format yet."
