= Dear All My Loves =

Single by Ki-Yo

from the album Reborn
- Released: June 1, 2012
- Genre: Pop
- Length: 3:55
- Label: Self-released
- Songwriter(s): Ki-Yo
- Producer(s): Ki-Yo

Ki-Yo singles chronology
"#1" (2012)	"Dear All My Loves" (2012)	"Spend My Life with You" (2012)

"Dear All My Loves" is a song recorded by Japanese singer Ki-Yo for his third studio album, Reborn (2013). It was written and produced by Ki-Yo.

This song was released on June 1, 2012 on iTunes and Amazon MP3 as the second single from his third studio album "Reborn". Also, this song was included in his compilation EP "KI-YO Single Collection Vol.1".

== Usage in media ==
"Dear All My Loves" was used in a radio program "Nagoya Women's Marathon Official Radio Program brought by NIKE".
