= Spend My Life with You (Ki-Yo song) =

Single by Ki-Yo

from the album Reborn
- Released: July 1, 2012
- Genre: Pop
- Length: 4:10
- Label: Self-released
- Songwriter(s): Ki-Yo
- Producer(s): Ki-Yo

Ki-Yo singles chronology
| "Dear All My Loves" (2012) | "Spend My Life with You" (2012) | "Need Somebody Tonight" (2012) |

"Spend My Life with You" is a song recorded by Japanese singer Ki-Yo for his third studio album, Reborn (2013). It was written and produced by Ki-Yo.

This song was released on July 1, 2012 on iTunes and Amazon MP3 as the third single from his third studio album "Reborn". Also, this song was included in his compilation EP "KI-YO Single Collection Vol.1".

== Music video ==
The music video was produced by Alexander. It was uploaded on YouTube on January 30, 2013.
