= Sick of It (TV series) =

- Genre: Comedy drama
- Created by: Karl Pilkington; Richard Yee
- Written by: Karl Pilkington; Richard Yee
- Directed by: Richard Yee
- Starring: Karl Pilkington; Sondra James; Marama Corlett
- Theme music composer: Joshua Moshier
- Country of origin: United Kingdom
- Original language: English
- No. of series: 2
- No. of episodes: 12

Production
- Producer: John Pocock
- Production locations: West London; Dungeness; Eastbourne; New York City
- Editor: Chris Watson
- Running time: 22 minutes
- Production companies: Me+You Productions; Alrite Productions

Original release
- Network: Sky One
- Release: 27 September 2018 – 24 January 2020

Sick of It is a British comedy-drama television series that premiered on Sky One on 27 September 2018. It was created and written by Karl Pilkington and Richard Yee (who also directed the series). Pilkington stars as both lead characters, playing his namesake Karl, and the voice inside his head that takes the form of his Doppelgänger.

The show was renewed for a second series. Pilkington stated on Lorraine that the second series would likely be the last.

== Premise ==
The series is set around Ladbroke Grove in London and follows Karl, a bored taxi driver who has been dumped by his girlfriend Zoe and moves in with his elderly American aunt Norma, and is struggling to get his life back on track. Karl's closest companion is the voice in his head, a sardonic, outspoken alter ego who takes the form of his double – it's the uncensored true version of Karl that says what he really thinks without the risk of offending others. As Karl attempts to move on from the break up and sort out his life, the voice in his head appears periodically to guide, criticise and dispense his unorthodox philosophy of life.

== Cast ==
=== Main cast ===
- Karl Pilkington as Karl
- Sondra James as Norma
- Marama Corlett as Ruby

=== Guest cast ===
Sick of It doesn’t have a regular fixed cast and instead features guest appearances each week from actors including Craig Parkinson, Kate Ashfield, Perry Benson, Finn Bennett, Remy Beasley, Mark Silcox, Raad Rawi, David Vujanic, Cokey Falcow, Lou Sanders, Shola Adewusi, Cavan Clerkin, Julia Krynke, and Doug Stanhope.

== Production ==
Karl Pilkington and Richard Yee had worked together since 2009 on An Idiot Abroad and The Moaning of Life. Yee initially approached Pilkington, whom he had collaborated with on previous projects, to begin writing a scripted show. Whilst hesitant, Pilkington agreed to a cameo appearance, and later to appear on the show as the main character. Yee wanted the show to remain authentic to Pilkington as a person, allowing comedy to present itself from that. Once the show idea formed, Pilkington agreed to appear in the show twice. As himself and his own conscience in the form of a doppelganger.

Writing took place three days a week, with out of hours contact between Yee and Pilkington on a regular basis. Pilkington wanted to differentiate Sick of It from other shows that used friend groups, such as Friends, due to this not being true to life in his view. Filming for season one took eight weeks, with Pilkington regularly playing both himself and his doppelganger. Early on, Pilkington expressed concern with the technological effort required to portray two characters in one scene, and planned to cease the idea entirely. The production team convinced him to continue however.

=== Casting ===
Pilkington opted not to cast familiar actors in Sick of It. At Yee's suggestion of an American actor, Pilkington met with Sondra James, who was subsequently cast in the role of Auntie Norma. For the second season, Marama Corlett was cast Karl's love interest Ruby, and was chosen as a deliberate contrast to Karl's character.

== Episodes ==
Series	Episodes	Originally released	
Series	Episodes	First released	Last released
1	6	27 September 2018	11 October 2018
2	6	10 January 2020	24 January 2020

=== Series 1 (2018) ===
No. overall	No. in series	Title	Directed by	Original release date	UK viewers (millions)
1	1	"The Sofa"	Richard Yee	27 September 2018	1.079m (combined Wed/Thu screening)
Karl and Norma are holding a wake for Uncle Vinnie at his house. There could be no better time for a delivery man to rock up with a new sofa and Karl needs to get shot of the old one fast. When he puts an ad online, he is given the runaround by Neil.
2	2	"The Scream"	Richard Yee	27 September 2018	710,400 (combined Wed/Thu screening)
Next door's noisy baby is doing Karl's head in, so when he picks up two mums and their crying kids in his taxi the next day, he loses it. This sends him off to counselling for anger management. There, his therapist forces him to confront his issues.
3	3	"Lonely People"	Richard Yee	4 October 2018	596,000
Karl books a holiday alone as he needs some me-time and decides to escape Auntie Norma for a holiday in the middle of nowhere. However, his hopes of a quiet week are dashed when the nosy locals discover he is on his own.
4	4	"Uncle Vinnie"	Richard Yee	4 October 2018	496,800
Karl and Norma wind up on a mad journey to Eastbourne after Karl accidentally takes a cherished photo to the charity shop. While Norma basks in her memories, Karl realises that things were not quite what they seemed when he stumbles on a secret.
5	5	"The Kid"	Richard Yee	11 October 2018	456,500
Karl's big plan to woo Zoe goes out the window when a dad and his son get into his cab. Then, an urgent pick-up derails things even further when he gets stuck in the traffic at the Pride festival.
6	6	"Bunged Up"	Richard Yee	11 October 2018	428,100
Dating is not going well for a constipated Karl; he has been out the game for a long time and finds himself constantly saying the wrong things. Well, that is until he meets someone who cannot understand what he says.

=== Series 2 (2020) ===
No. overall	No. in series	Title	Directed by	Original release date	UK viewers (millions)
7	1	"The Biscuit"	Richard Yee	10 January 2020	N/A
Karl sets out to hire a carer for Norma, although he doesn't think she really needs one.
8	2	"The En-Suite"	Richard Yee	10 January 2020	N/A
Karl takes a job as a chauffeur in order to pay for a new car and, eventually, a place of his own but his new job prevents him from spending time with Norma.
9	3	"Useless Lump"	Richard Yee	17 January 2020	N/A
A health scare sends Karl into despair when he realises he may have another forty years to live. Ruby convinces him to go back to Manchester to see an old friend.
10	4	"Love & Laughter"	Richard Yee	17 January 2020	N/A
Karl just can't seem to laugh anymore, at least, not while he's awake. A night out at a comedy club brings Karl and Ruby closer together.
11	5	"Use By Date"	Richard Yee	24 January 2020	N/A
Karl starts to realize how much he likes Ruby. The trouble is he doesn't know if she likes him back
12	6	"The End"	Richard Yee	24 January 2020	N/A
Karl and Ruby take a trip to New York to clear up some family business.

== Reception ==
Lucy Mangan from The Guardian gave the first two episodes 3 out of 5, observing, "It may not have been pure Pilkington, but perhaps in these melancholy times we couldn’t cope with that simple, shining joy anyway." The Telegraph likewise awarded 3 out of 5 stars. Morgan Jeffery at Radio Times gave the second series 4 stars out of 5, calling it "a smart, well-observed, touching and, yes, funny reflection on the intricacies and trivialities of modern life, and a step-up from the already formidable first series". Rosie Bayliss of The Courier criticised the repetitiveness of the show and referred to Pilkington's character as unappealing. She praised the soundtrack however.
