= By Any Means (2013 TV series) =

- Genre: Crime drama
- Created by: Tony Jordan; Richard Lazarus; James Payne; Jeff Povey; Richard Zajdlic
- Directed by: Charles Palmer
- Starring: Warren Brown; Shelley Conn; Andrew-Lee Potts; Elliot Knight; Gina McKee
- Theme music composer: Jamiroquai
- Composer: Samuel Sim
- Country of origin: United Kingdom
- Original language: English
- No. of episodes: 6 (list of episodes)

Production
- Executive producers: Tony Jordan; Belinda Campbell; Polly Hill
- Producer: Tim Key
- Production locations: Birmingham, West Midlands, England
- Cinematography: David Higgs
- Running time: 60 minutes
- Production company: Red Planet Pictures

Original release
- Network: BBC One; BBC One HD
- Release: 22 September – 27 October 2013

By Any Means is a six-part British television drama series that premiered on BBC One on 22 September 2013.

== Synopsis ==
The series follows the escapades of a clandestine unit that exists in the grey area between law and justice. Living on the edge, they play the criminal elite at their own game. The team consists of the leader, sharp and elusive Jack Quinn (Warren Brown), straight-talking Jessica Jones (Shelley Conn), digital whizz-kid Thomas "TomTom" Tomkins (Andrew-Lee Potts) and Charlie O'Brien (Elliot Knight). They stop at nothing, as they weave a web of cunning and deception, in order to trap their targets and bring them to justice. Details of the criminals originate from a mysterious Helen Barlow (Gina McKee).

== Production ==
Filming began in Birmingham on 26 April 2013. Belinda Campbell, the executive producer for Red Planet Pictures, said: "By Any Means is a gripping and edgy drama, wonderfully crafted by our talented writing team. We’re delighted to have such a strong line-up of talent both on and off screen to translate these intricate plots and characters. With the action taking place on the cusp of the law, it provides the perfect premise for dramatic scenes, surprise twists and turns in the plot, as well as brilliantly complex and rich characters."

Polly Hill, head of Independent Drama for the BBC, said: "It’s great to see such a strong cast come together to form this original team in By Any Means. Tony has created a maverick team which we think our BBC One audience will enjoy and this cast will brilliantly bring that to screen."

The between scene montages are London, and the drama is set in named London locations and areas. Some scenes were filmed at Birmingham Film Studios. Spring Grove House was also used as a Colombian embassy. Tim Key, producer of the series for Red Planet Pictures, said, "Spring Grove House is a fantastic location for filming and we’re delighted to have been given permission to shoot there. We looked at a lot of locations for these key scenes, but Spring Grove House provided exactly what we were looking for, working perfectly as the interior of the Embassy." Other places where scenes were filmed include the Victoria Law Courts, Hotel La Tour and the Hyatt, Colmore Row, New Street, the Mailbox, Cannon Hill Park, and Sutton Park, West Midlands.

In September 2013, it was revealed that Arsenal F.C. had banned By Any Means from using the club's branded shirts in the first episode because the storyline portrayed its fans as criminals. Red Planet Pictures used generic tops without any branding instead.

Warren Brown confirmed on Twitter that By Any Means had not been commissioned for a second series.

== Cast ==
Cast of By Any Means – Elliot Knight, Warren Brown, Shelley Conn and Andrew-Lee Potts

The core cast includes the team of four and their contact inside the police, Helen Barlow. Other actors join the cast for each episode.

- Warren Brown as Jack Quinn
- Shelley Conn as Jessica Jones
- Andrew-Lee Potts as Thomas "TomTom" Tomkins
- Elliot Knight as Charlie O'Brien
- Gina McKee as Helen Barlow

== Episode list ==
No.	Title	Directed by	Written by	Original release date	UK viewers (millions)
1	"Episode 1"	Charles Palmer	Tony Jordan	22 September 2013	5.23
An innocent family is terrorised and their father murdered in cold blood. Everyone knows that ruthless criminal Nick Mason (Keith Allen) is behind it and when Mason, known as the 'Teflon Man', walks free from his trial for the third time in five years that he has evaded justice, Helen Barlow, convinced Mason has at least one corrupt police officer on his payroll, calls on Jack Quinn and his team for help to take Mason down and get him off the streets. Guest starring: Keith Allen, Martin Jarvis, Richard Lumsden, Paul Thornley, Bessie Cursons, Jordan Long, Andy Beckwith, Jessica Ellerby, John Webber, Barbara Drennan, James Norton, Gregory Floy, Ben Cartwright, Josef Altin, Grahame Fox, John Henshaw and Bradley Ford
2	"Episode 2"	Charles Palmer	Richard Zajdlic	29 September 2013	4.49
A young girl, Kimberley Brooks (Sacha Parkinson), is found dead in the boot of a car belonging to a well-respected judge, Peter Hopkins, in what seems like an open-and-shut case. Helen is suspicious and calls in the team to investigate, convinced the judge has been framed by an ex-policeman, Joe Tyrus (Neil Maskell), with a personal vendetta. If the judge is found guilty all the cases he was involved in would have to be reopened. Guest starring: Neil Maskell, Stephanie Leonidas, Kate Dickie, Christopher Fulford, Sacha Parkinson, Tim Berrington, Lex Shrapnel, John Henshaw and Charlie Anson
3	"Episode 3"	Menhaj Huda	Richard Lazarus	6 October 2013	4.07
A building is deliberately burnt to the ground and eighteen people are killed. Suspicion falls on ruthless property developer Phillip Granger (Christopher Villiers) but the police cannot get to him because he is holed up in the Colombian Embassy, where the ambassador is an old school friend. Determined to put him behind bars, Jack and his team set up a surveillance operation at the nearby home of a doddery old lady, Celia Butler (Honor Blackman), while Charlie infiltrates the embassy to woo the ambassador's daughter that as it progresses threatens to cloud his judgement. Guest starring: David Bedella, Honor Blackman, Naomi Scott, Christopher Villiers, Ross Tomlinson, Alana Hood, Huw Higginson, Christopher Sciueref and David Martin as the Thug
4	"Episode 4"	Menhaj Huda	Jeff Povey	13 October 2013	4.20
Former bank finance director Sally Walker (Harriet Walter) and her retired MP husband Laurence (Michael Maloney) have been cleared of stealing £3 million from their children's charity fund and two investigating police officers lost their jobs. The Walkers claim the money was stolen by mystery hackers and Helen uses the team and TomTom's skills to scours cyberspace to uncover where and how the couple have hidden the money. A persistent journalist's, Holly Goodridge (Amy Nuttall), own investigation inadvertently puts their back up plan of surveillance at risk forcing them to kidnap Laurence Walker. The kidnap is broken up by the police, and the team is directed to stop. They come up with a second plan, much simpler, that pushes the Walkers to bring the cash out in the open. Guest starring: Amy Nuttall, Harriet Walter, Michael Maloney, Rowena King, Alison Newman and Stephen Taylor
5	"Episode 5"	Mark Everest	James Payne	20 October 2013	4.21
An innocent bystander is killed during a drug deal and MI5 offers the killer freedom in exchange for giving up his terrorist connections. Protected, untouchable and hidden Helen wants the team to bring him to justice. The team's plan to bring him out into the open requires breaking one of his fellow criminals out of prison. Guest starring: Ashraf Barhom, Stewart Scudamore, David Harewood, Karl Collins, Caroline Chikezie, Ray MacAllan, Mem Ferda, Tom Andrews and Derek Hutchinson
6	"Episode 6"	Mark Everest	Tony Jordan	27 October 2013	4.07
A vicious drug dealer, Jamie Caine (Nick Moran), kills a young boy and walks free when a witness under threat retracts his statement. The dealer has plans to import large amount of a new drug aimed at children into the country. Helen defies orders not to interfere and Quinn uses O'Brien who knows Caine's 17-year-old girlfriend, Robin Tyler (Madeline Duggan) for information, to target Caine with disastrous results for the girl and O'Brien. Guest starring: Doug Allen, Madeline Duggan, Nick Moran, Adrian Rawlins, James Farrar, Nicholas Chambers and Nick Holder

== Reception ==
=== Ratings ===
Overnight figures showed that the first episode of By Any Means on 22 September 2013 was watched by 16.4% of the viewing audience for that time, with 4.11 million watching it. The second episode was watched by 14.1% of the viewing audience with 3.46 million according to overnight figures. The third episode was watched by 11.8% of the viewing audience with 2.91 million viewers, according to overnight figures. The fourth, fifth and sixth episodes had viewing audiences of 12.2%, 12.6% and 12.0% respectively.

=== Critical reception ===
Jasper Rees of The Daily Telegraph commented: "By Any Means is the brainchild of Tony Jordan, and shares much of the DNA of his inexhaustible hit Hustle. There is trickery and quippery from photogenic leads, cartoon hoodlums are duly bested, and it’s all shot in swish kinetic fast-forward. ... Along the way there was an awful lot of self-satisfied yak from the leads, who need to watch it or they could easily annoy the crap out of whoever’s not watching Downton." Matt Baylis of the Daily Express said: "If you wanted to feel really angry at how the BBC spends our money, you could have watched By Any Means, a revoltingly poor action drama about a covert police unit that operates beyond the law. Its presence and unspeakable badness make you suspect that some writers merely have to shove a shopping list in the direction of the BBC to get a commission." The Independent's Alice Jones said "It looked promising, if derivative, enough – some Mad Men-style silhouetted credits, lots of Guy Ritchie zooming and jump-cuts, a classy cast – but it added up to lowest common denominator drama."

Metro said "By Any Means failed to rise above the clichés in its first episode". Radio Times said "every second of By Any Means is ridiculous, yet it’s well done and strangely likeable, a noisy brew of Hustle and Spooks with a dash of Charlie's Angels." Yahoo! said: "Despite the cliché ridden script and stereotypical characters, the show's biggest downfall was its lack of direction. At times, it felt like it was trying too hard to be a hybrid of some of television's recent successes. Stylistically, it was very similar to Hustle, although some may argue this was always going to be the case with Tony Jordan leading the writing team, and the group's tactics seemed very reminiscent of Sherlock, just without the spark."

Alison Graham of Radio Times said: "By Any Means is sweetly retro, even though it thinks it’s bang-on 21st-century computer-game fast, as good guys catch bad guys (by any illegal means, of course), all played out against a painfully loud, jangly soundtrack that’s as insistent as a chainsaw. But it fits the pattern of everything from The A-Team to Charlie's Angels (it even has a shadowy, though female, figure issuing the orders from afar), a thick-eared adventure yarn that exists purely to entertain. Which is why I can’t help but like it."

== Home media ==
The series will be released on DVD in the UK on 8 September 2014. as of June 2015 it is still to be released in the UK, although a Dutch DVD exists with edited 50 minute episodes, as opposed to the 60 minutes broadcast in the UK.
