= Ghosts (What We Do in the Shadows) =

- What We Do in the Shadows episode
- Episode no.: Season 2 Episode 2
- Directed by: Kyle Newacheck
- Written by: Paul Simms
- Cinematography by: DJ Stipsen
- Editing by: Yana Gorskaya; Daniel Haworth
- Production code: XWS02003
- Original air date: April 15, 2020
- Running time: 21 minutes

Guest appearance
- Jake McDorman as Gregor

Episode chronology
← Previous "Resurrection"	Next → "Brain Scramblies"

"Ghosts" is the second episode of the second season of the American mockumentary comedy horror television series What We Do in the Shadows, set in the franchise of the same name. It is the twelfth overall episode of the series and was written by executive producer Paul Simms, and directed by producer Kyle Newacheck. It was released on FX on April 15, 2020, airing back-to-back with the previous episode, "Resurrection".

The series is set in Staten Island, New York City. Like the 2014 film, the series follows the lives of vampires in the city. These consist of three vampires, Nandor, Laszlo, and Nadja. They live alongside Colin Robinson, an energy vampire; and Guillermo, Nandor's familiar. The series explores the absurdity and misfortunes experienced by the vampires. In the episode, the vampires realize that they are disturbed by ghosts and settle on helping them with their unfinished business so they can move on.

According to Nielsen Media Research, the episode was seen by an estimated 0.409 million household viewers and gained a 0.17 ratings share among adults aged 18–49. The episode received positive reviews from critics, who praised the humor, originality and limited scale. The episode received a nomination for Outstanding Writing for a Comedy Series at the 72nd Primetime Emmy Awards.

== Plot ==
Things start moving through the house, and the vampires believe Guillermo (Harvey Guillén) is responsible. Eventually, Nadja (Natasia Demetriou) concludes that there are ghosts in the house, dead beings with unfinished business.

Nadja performs a séance to talk with the ghosts. It turns out that the ghost is actually Gregor (Jake McDorman), annoying Laszlo (Matt Berry). Curious about their unfinished business, the vampires perform another séance to see the ghosts of their previous lives. While Laszlo and Nadja bond with their respective selves, Nandor (Kayvan Novak) struggles in understanding his self, as he forgot how to speak his original extinct language. While they try to solve their unfinished business, Nadja hangs out with her past self and decides to let her stay. Ghost Nadja then possesses one of Nadja's dolls, with Nadja telling her to not let the others know.

After struggling, Nandor eventually concludes that his ghost self wants to reconnect with his warrior horse, whom he killed to eat due to starvation. Through a séance, they summon the ghost of the horse. Ghost Nandor reunites with the horse and both disappear as their unfinished business is done. Meanwhile, Laszlo helps his ghost self orgasm, as Nadja turned him to a vampire during sex before he could ejaculate. Later, Colin Robinson (Mark Proksch) conjures his dead grandmother, just to tell her an "updog" joke he repeatedly said to the vampires. After she laughs, he vanishes her, not wanting to catch up with her.

== Production ==
=== Development ===
In March 2020, FX confirmed that the second episode of the season would be titled "Ghosts", and that it would be written by executive producer Paul Simms, and directed by producer Kyle Newacheck. This was Simms' third writing credit, and Newacheck's second directing credit.

== Reception ==
=== Viewers ===
In its original American broadcast, "Ghosts" was seen by an estimated 0.409 million household viewers with a 0.17 in the 18-49 demographics. This means that 0.17 percent of all households with televisions watched the episode. This was a 24% decrease in viewership from the previous episode, which was watched by 0.537 million household viewers with a 0.22 in the 18-49 demographics.

With DVR factored in, the episode was watched by 0.915 million viewers with a 0.3 in the 18-49 demographics.

=== Critical reviews ===
"Ghosts" received positive reviews from critics. Katie Rife of The A.V. Club gave the episode a "B" grade and wrote, "A pretty good episode of What We Do In The Shadows is still better than the best episode of many TV comedies, however. And it's exciting to see that the show is getting a little more ambitious in its action scenes and with its special effects while keeping all the things that made the first season click. There were some fabulous faux-medieval paintings of Nandor in this episode as well. Shoutout to the art history nerd who creates those."

Tony Sokol of Den of Geek gave the episode a 4.5 star rating out of 5 and wrote, "'Ghosts' is an almost historic episode and is sure to be a fan favorite. The expansion of the monster universe is always a welcome addition. The episode only features the main characters, the only guest in the house this week is formerly-Jeff, who is almost family. He is assured to come back because he's been banished without even getting to finish his tale of unfinished business. The series continues to gain its self-assured footing as it dances across the horror genre with unabashed glee." Greg Wheeler of The Review Geek gave the episode a 3.5 star rating out of 5 and wrote, "With a simple story layered with interesting character developments, What We Do In The Shadows does well with its second episode, allowing our trio of vampires to have their own individual scenes before bringing things full circle at the end with Colin Robinson. Throughout the episode are numerous memorable jokes and quite what will happen now that Nadja's ghost is possessing this doll remains to be seen."

=== Accolades ===
For the episode, Paul Simms was nominated for Outstanding Writing for a Comedy Series at the 72nd Primetime Emmy Awards. He lost the award to Schitt's Creek for the episode "Happy Ending".
