= Voodoo (film) =

- Directed by: Rene Eram
- Written by: Brian DiMuccio; Dino Vindeni
- Produced by: Donald P. Borchers
- Starring: Corey Feldman; Jack Nance; Joel J. Edwards; Diane Nadeau; Ron Melendez; Sarah Douglas
- Edited by: Paulo Mazzucato
- Music by: Keith Bilderbeck
- Production company: Planet Productions
- Distributed by: Image Organization; Two Moon Releasing
- Release date: November 1995
- Country: United States
- Language: English

Voodoo is a 1995 American horror film directed by Rene Eram and written by Brian DiMuccio and Dino Vindeni. Corey Feldman stars as a youth who must contend with a Voodoo cult. Filmed in the United States in the spring of 1995, Voodoo was released on VHS by A-Pix Entertainment in November 1995, and was first released in the United States on DVD format through Simitar Entertainment in 1997.

== Plot ==
Unable and unwilling to live apart from his girlfriend, Andy has decided to move from the UK to the United States, so that he can be near Rebecca while she studies medicine at university. He meets Cassian Marsh, who persuades him to approach the Omega fraternity where Marsh is the leader. Following a typical fraternity initiation, Andy is offered a place in the Omega house and readily accepts. He then notices a suspicious looking old man hanging around the campus and the stranger warns him that the brotherhood are hiding a dark secret: Marsh is part of a Voodoo cult and that remaining at the fraternity could be dangerous. Andy decides he is just a crazy old man; but, as events unfold, it seems that Marsh is just using the Frat house as a front in order to practice voodoo along with his zombie friends.

== Cast ==
- Corey Feldman as Andy Chadway
- Jack Nance as Lewis
- Joel J. Edwards as Cassian Marsh
- Diane Nadeau as Rebecca
- Ron Melendez as Eric
- Sarah Douglas as Prof. Conner
- Amy Raasch as Wendy
- Brian Michael McGuire as Ken
- Christopher Kriesa as Baird
- Clark Tufts as Loomis
- Maury Ginsberg as Deitz
- Darren Eichorn as David
- Brendan Hogan as Stan

== Reception ==
Peter Dendle wrote in The Zombie Movie Encyclopedia, "This run-of-the-mill campus thriller crosses Angel Heart with Revenge of the Nerds, as if that were a niche that really needed filling."
