= Orgy (game) =

1986 board game

Orgy is a board game published in 1986 by Comissatio Ltd.

== Contents ==
Orgy is a game in which players try to gain enough wealth to become a Roman consul.

== Reception ==
The G.I. Moe Review-Team reviewed Orgy for Games International magazine and stated that "Orgy is obviously not a game for the "serious" gamer. But still... the game can be good fun. Play value depends very much on who you play with (and where you sit)! It is a bit expensive though."
