= Ki-Yo =

Japanese pop singer (born 1982)

Ki-Yo（Tendo Kiyotaka） Ki-Yo（天道清貴）
- Born: November 22, 1982 (age 43)
- Origin: Miyagi, Japan
- Genres: J-pop
- Occupation: Singer-songwriter
- Instruments: Vocals, piano
- Years active: 2000–present
- Labels: EXPRESS, Bellwood, GENIUS
- Website: tendokiyotaka.com

Ki-Yo (清貴, Kiyotaka; born on November 22, 1982) is a Japanese pop singer. Since his debut, Ki-Yo has worked as a singer, composer, lyricist and ambassador of Miyagi Prefecture. He's known as one of the few openly LGBT musicians in Japan.

== History ==
=== Early life ===
In 1982, Ki-Yo was born in Sendai, Miyagi. He was musically influenced by Mariah Carey, Stevie Wonder, Aretha Franklin, Akiko Yano, Elton John, Billy Joel, Noriyuki Makihara, Whitney Houston.

=== 2000–2006: debut and career in Japan ===
In 2000, Ki-Yo sent a demo to EMI Music Japan when he visited Tokyo to see a concert by Mariah Carey, and was signed by the label for his debut. On October 22, 2000, his first single "No No No" was released. It was a success, charting No. 45 on the Oricon single weekly chart.

On April 18, 2001, "The Only One", his most commercially successful single to date, was released as a third single. It was used in a romantic drama, "Pure Soul ~Kimi ga boku wo wasuretemo~". Eventually, this single charted on the Oricon single yearly chart at No. 82 and Oricon single weekly chart at No. 12 with selling over 400,000 copies. He subsequently appeared in the Japanese music TV show Music Station twice.

His debut album I'll be there was released on July 25, 2001. It charted No. 7 on the Oricon album weekly chart.

In 2004, he sang a backing vocal part in "Shiawase ni narou"（幸せになろう）, a song by Japanese popular singer Hiromi Iwasaki. This song was included in her 25th album, "Happiness" and it peaked at No. 99 on Oricon Weekly Album Chart.

On December 8, 2004, he released an EP "Stop On By", which includes a cover of a Japanese popular children's song "Tenohira wo Taiyou ni", whose lyrics were written by Takashi Yanase, a Japanese cartoonist best known for Anpanman.

In 2006, he released "Ocean Blue" as an eighth single. It had been two years since he had released his last EP "Stop On By". The song did not enter any charts. This was the last single he released from major record companies to date.

=== 2010–present: working in America and going back to Japan ===
In 2010, he moved to New York City and started working there. He participated in the Harlem Japanese Gospel Choir and performed in McDonald's Gospelfest, Gospel Night at Apollo Theater and a play called Black Nativity in off Broadway.

In 2011, The Harlem Japanese Gospel Choir was invited to Annual Keepers of the Dream Award Ceremony as a guest choir. their musical talent was praised by Stevie Wonder.

He was played at musical venues including the Bitter End, Canal Room and Whisky a Go Go.

On November 19, 2014, he covered "Let It Go" in the Japanese popular music competition program "The Karaoke Battle".

In 2015, he wrote a song called "Anata ni Smile" (あなたにスマイル:)) for a Japanese top singer, Misia. This song was included in her album, "Love Bebop", which was released on January 6, 2015 and this album charted at No. 4 on Oricon Daily Album Chart. Also, this song was used in a TV commercial of a Japanese famous drink manufacturer, Kirin beverage.

On December 27, 2015, he performed on a live event, "Sing Mariah" with Japanese female singer Mao Denda. Her first album "Eternal Voice" has sold over 50,000 copies so far. In May 2016, he announced that he left his management team "Rhythmedia".

On June 30, 2016, he started crowdfunding to release his fourth studio album Anata ga Itekureta kara (あなたがいてくれたから).

== Personal life ==
Ki-Yo is openly gay. He came out in TOKYO RAINBOW PRIDE 2015.

He took part in "OUT IN JAPAN", an LGBT project by Singaporean photographer Leslie Kee.

== Discography ==
=== Albums ===
==== Studio albums ====
Title	Album details	Peak chart positions	Sales
Title	Album details	JPN Oricon	Sales
I'll be there	Released: July 25, 2001; Label: Express; Formats: CD, digital download	7	JPN: 130,000
A Piece of Love	Released: January 1, 2010; Label: Self-released; Formats: CD, digital download	–	
Reborn	Released: August 1, 2013; Label: Self-released; Formats: CD, digital download	–	
Anata ga Itekureta kara （あなたがいてくれたから）	Released: November 13, 2016; Label: Self-released; Formats: CD	–	

==== Reissue albums ====
Title	Album details	Peak chart positions
Title	Album details	JPN Oricon
Reborn (Special Edition)	Released: September 28, 2015; Label: Self-released; Formats: CD, digital download	—

==== Remix albums ====
Title	Album details	Peak chart positions
Title	Album details	JPN Oricon
The Remix EP	Released: March 29, 2003; Label: Express; Formats: CD, digital download	—

==== Compilation albums ====
Title	EP details	Peak chart positions
Title	EP details	JPN Oricon
KI-YO Single Collection Vol.1	Released: 2012; Label: Self-released; Formats: digital download	—

==== Extended plays ====
Title	EP details	Peak chart positions
Title	EP details	JPN Oricon
Stop On By	Released: December 8, 2004; Label: Genius; Formats: CD	—

=== Singles ===
==== As lead artist ====
Single	Year	Peak chart positions	Certifications	Album
Single	Year	JPN Oricon	Certifications	Album
"No No No"	2000	45		I'll be there
"Vanishing"	2001	43		I'll be there
"The Only One"	2001	12	RIAJ: Gold	I'll be there
"Signal"	2001	12		Non-album singles
"Shiawase no Hizashi" （シアワセの陽射し）	2002	44		Non-album singles
"Call me"	2003	82		Non-album singles
"Just for you..."	2003	112		Non-album singles
"Ocean Blue"	2005	–		Non-album singles
"#1"	2012	–		KI-YO Single Collection Vol.1; Reborn; Reborn (Special Edition)
"Dear All My Loves"	2012	–		KI-YO Single Collection Vol.1; Reborn; Reborn (Special Edition)
"Spend My Life with You"	2012	–		KI-YO Single Collection Vol.1; Reborn; Reborn (Special Edition)
"Need Somebody Tonight"	2012	–		KI-YO Single Collection Vol.1; Reborn; Reborn (Special Edition)

==== Promotional singles ====
Single	Year	Peak chart positions	Certifications	Album
Single	Year	JPN Oricon	Certifications	Album
"If You Wanna Make It" (featuring Cassandra Kubinski)	2012	–		Reborn; Reborn (Special Edition)
"We Are One"	2015	–		Anata ga Itekureta kara

=== DVDs ===
- KIYOTAKA Tour 2010 Over The Sea (Yokohama Edition(BLUE))（2010）
- KIYOTAKA Tour 2010 Over The Sea (Osaka Edition(RED))（2010）
- Viaggio in Italia 2008（2011）
- KIYOTAKA LIVE TOUR 2011 "OVER THE SEA"（2011）
- KIYOTAKA AUTUMN TOUR 2011 "SOUL FROM NEW YORK"（2012）
- Ki-Yo JAPAN TOUR 2012 "#1"（2013）
- Ki-Yo LIVE at Canal Room in New York（2013）
