= My One and Only =

My One and Only may refer to:

== Film and theatre ==
- My One and Only (film), a 2009 comedy starring Logan Lerman and Renée Zellweger
- My One and Only (musical), a 1983 musical with music and lyrics by George and Ira Gershwin
- My One and Only, a 2019 Hallmark Channel television movie starring Pascale Hutton

== Television ==
- My One and Only (TV series), a 2023 Singaporean television series

== Music ==
- My One and Only (original cast recording), an album from the 1983 musical
- My One and Only, a 1998 album by Trudy Desmond
- "My One and Only" (1927 song), a song written by George and Ira Gershwin for the musical Funny Face
- "My One and Only" (Bones song), 1974
- "My One and Only", a song by Etta James, 1956
- "Kisses and Tears (My One and Only)", a song by Bad Boys Blue, 1986
- "Lily (My One and Only)", a song by the Smashing Pumpkins from Mellon Collie and the Infinite Sadness, 1995

== See also ==
- One and Only (disambiguation)
- The One and Only (disambiguation)
