= Marama Corlett =

Maltese actress and dancer

- Born: Malta
- Occupations: Actress and dancer
- Years active: 2009–present
- Known for: Blood Drive

Marama Corlett is a Maltese actress and dancer. She portrayed Aki in Blood Drive, Ruby in Sick of It, and Corporal Angua in The Watch.

== Career ==
Corlett started her dance career with the Ballet Russ de Malt in Malta, before moving to England to further pursue her ballet career.

Her first professional acting role was in the 2010 film The Devil's Double, directed by New Zealand director Lee Tamahori. She played Lois Fisher in the 2011 West End production of The Children's Hour, directed by Ian Rickson.

In 2011, Sky1 announced that Corlett would play Rina in the television drama Sinbad; she had to learn boxing to prepare for her role. Corlett appeared in Desert Dancer (2013) alongside Freida Pinto, and Maleficent (2014) with Angelina Jolie.

She can be also seen in the music videos for "How" (2016) by Daughter, "The Invisibles" (2018) by Suede, and "You're My Waterloo" (2015) by The Libertines.

== Filmography ==
Year	Title	Role	Notes
2009	What a Witch	Lady in Present	short film
2010	Todd and the Tooth Fairy	Boatperson	short film
2010	Missed Connections	Date #4	short film
2011	The Devil's Double	Hennahead	Film
2012	Sinbad	Rina	TV series; Main cast: 12 episodes
2012	Duende	Young Girl	short film
2013	The Bridge	The Girlfriend	short film
2013	Let's Talk About Sex	Anja	short film
2013	Desert Dancer	Mona	Film
2014	Guardians of the Galaxy	Pit Boss	Film
2014	Maleficent	Servant	Film
2014	The Goob	Eva	Film
2015	The Dovekeepers	Sia	TV series; 1 episodes
2015	A.D. The Bible Continues	Tabitha	TV series; 3 episodes
2016	A Girl Goes for Dinner	The Girl	short film
2017	Blood Drive	Aki	TV series; 13 episodes
2017	Sick Note	Linda	TV series; Series 1, 13 episodes
2017	Afterword	Young Woman	Short film
2018	The City and the City	Rebecca	TV series; 2 episodes
2019	Strike Back: Revolution	Natasha Petrenko	TV series; 2 episodes
2020	Sick of it	Ruby	TV series; Series 2, 6 episodes
2020	His Dark Materials	Katja Sirkka	TV series; 1 episode
2021	The Watch	Corporal Angua	TV series; Main cast
2023	Black Mirror	Theta	Episode: "Beyond the Sea"
2024	We Live in Time	Adrienne Duvall	Film
