= Elliot Knight =

British actor (born 1990)

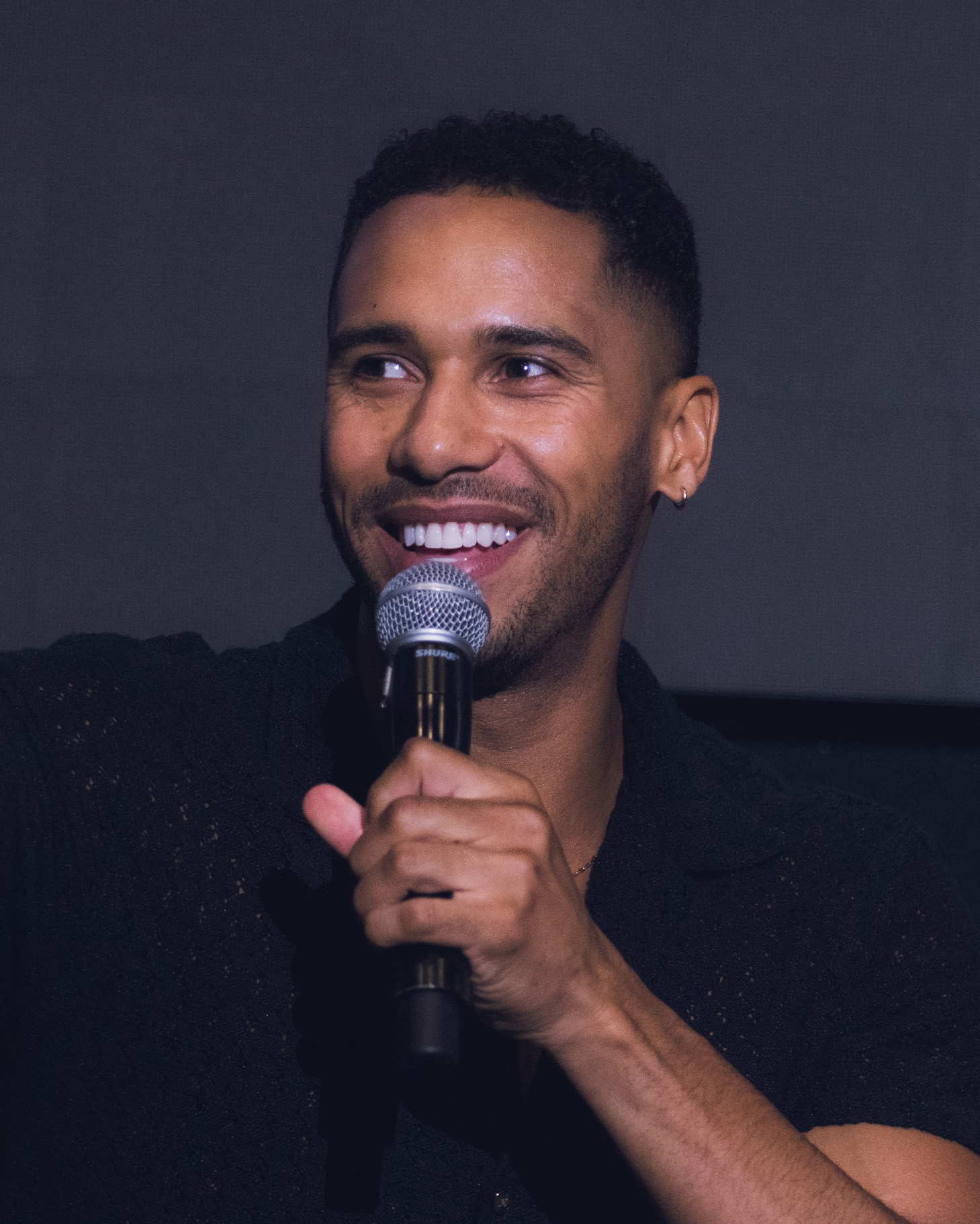
- Knight in 2025
- Born: July 10, 1990 (age 36); Birmingham, West Midlands, UK
- Education: Manchester Metropolitan University
- Occupation: Actor
- Years active: 2011–present

Elliot Knight (born July 10, 1990) is an English actor. He made his acting debut as the title character on the Sky1 action-adventure series Sinbad (2012). Continuing to work on television, Knight appeared as a series regular on the BBC One crime drama By Any Means (2013), the CBS mystery American Gothic, and The CW comedy-drama Life Sentence (2018), in addition to portraying Merlin on the ABC fantasy Once Upon a Time (2015) and Don Hall / Dove on the DC Universe / HBO Max superhero drama Titans (2018; 2021). On film, he appeared in the science fiction horror Color Out of Space (2020). Knight also portrayed Kyle "Gaz" Garrick in the first-person shooters Call of Duty: Modern Warfare (2019), Call of Duty: Modern Warfare II (2022), Call of Duty: Modern Warfare III (2023), and Call of Duty: Modern Warfare 4 (2026). Knight also (as of July 3 of 2023) hosts the Open Up podcast about "Real conversations with diverse artists opening up about their experiences behind-the-scenes of the entertainment industry".

== Early life and education ==
Knight was born in Birmingham, United Kingdom to Stuart and Lorna Knight, who were both teachers. His father worked at Broadway Secondary School in Perry Barr, Birmingham. He was a pupil at King Edward VI Aston School and studied subsequently at the Manchester Metropolitan School of Theatre, where he graduated with a Bachelor of Arts degree in 2011.

== Career ==
In June 2011, Sky1 announced that Knight had won the lead role in the television drama Sinbad which was his first professional role. The series premiered in July 2012. In 2013, Knight joined the cast of BBC crime drama By Any Means. In 2015, Knight was cast to play Merlin in the fifth season of Once Upon a Time.

In March 2017, Knight was cast as Wes Charles in The CW series Life Sentence. The series was picked up in May for a midseason premiere some time in 2018.

In 2020, Knight starred opposite Nicolas Cage and Joely Richardson in the sci-fi cosmic horror film Color Out of Space, directed by Richard Stanley.

In 2021, Knight was cast as Officer Chadwick in season 5 of the TNT crime drama Animal Kingdom. In 2024, Knight appeared in the 4th season of The Boys on Amazon Prime Video as Colin, Frenchie's love interest.

In 2024, Knight guest-starred as Davide in the HBO comedy series "Hacks."

In 2025, Knight played a lead role in Countdown on Amazon Prime Video.

== Personal life ==
Elliot Knight is openly queer.

== Filmography ==
Film and television roles
| Year | Title | Role | Notes |
|---|---|---|---|
| 2012 | Sinbad | Sinbad | Lead role, 12 episodes |
| 2013 | Law & Order: UK | Neil Jenkins | 1 episode |
| 2013 | By Any Means | Charlie O' Brien | Main role, 6 episodes |
| 2014 | How to Get Away with Murder | Aiden Walker | 2 episodes |
| 2015 | Once Upon a Time | Merlin | Recurring role, 6 episodes |
| 2016 | American Gothic | Brady Ross | Main role |
| 2016 | Billionaire Ransom | Marsac | Film |
| 2016 | No Tomorrow | Graham | 1 episode |
| 2017 | 400 Boys | B-Big | |
| 2018 | Life Sentence | Wes Charles | Main role; 13 episodes |
| 2018, 2021 | Titans | Don Hall / Dove | 2 episodes |
| 2019 | Color Out of Space | Ward Phillips | |
| 2021 | Animal Kingdom | Officer Chadwick | 6 episodes |
| 2023 | Your Lucky Day | Abraham | |
| 2024 | The Boys | Colin Hauser | Recurring role, 4 episodes |
| 2024 | Hacks | Davide | 1 episode |
| 2025 | Countdown | Keyonte Bell | Main role |

Video games
| Year | Title | Role | Notes |
|---|---|---|---|
| 2019 | Call of Duty: Modern Warfare | Kyle "Gaz" Garrick | Playable Character. Voice and motion capture performance |
| 2022 | Call of Duty: Modern Warfare II | Kyle "Gaz" Garrick | Playable Character. Voice and motion capture performance |
| 2023 | Call of Duty: Modern Warfare III | Kyle "Gaz" Garrick | Voice and motion capture performance |
| 2026 | Marathon | Triage | Playable Character. Voice performance |
| 2026 | Call of Duty: Modern Warfare 4 | Kyle "Gaz" Garrick | Playable Character. Voice and motion capture performance |
