= You Are the Only One =

You Are the Only One or You're the Only One may refer to:

- You Are the Only One (TV series), 2014-2015 South Korean television series
- You're the Only One (album), a 1990 album by Faye Wong

== Songs ==
- "You're the Only One" (Dolly Parton song), 1979 single release
- "You Are the Only One" (Emily Osment song), 2010
- "You Are the Only One" (Sergey Lazarev song), Russia's entry to Eurovision Song Contest 2016
- "You Are the Only One" (Ivan Mikulić song), Croatian entry in the Eurovision Song Contest 2004
- "You Are the Only One", song by Candy O'Terry and Charlie Farren
- "You Are the Only One", unreleased song by Queen
- "You Are the Only One", song by Kirk Franklin and God's Property from God's Property from Kirk Franklin's Nu Nation
- "You Are the Only One", 1960 single by Ricky Nelson
- "You're the Only One", chart single by Val Doonican 1968
- "You're the Only One", song by Eric Benet from Love & Life
- "You're the Only One", song by Maria Mena from Mellow
