= The Orgy =

- What We Do in the Shadows episode
- Episode no.: Season 1 Episode 9
- Directed by: Jason Woliner
- Written by: Marika Sawyer
- Cinematography by: DJ Stipsen
- Editing by: Yana Gorskaya; Shawn Paper
- Production code: XWS01009
- Original air date: May 22, 2019
- Running time: 22 minutes

Guest appearance
- James Dwyer as Jeremy

Episode chronology
| ← Previous "Citizenship" | Next → "Ancestry" |

"The Orgy" is the ninth episode of the first season of the American mockumentary comedy horror television series What We Do in the Shadows, set in the franchise of the same name. The episode was written by consulting producer Marika Sawyer, and directed by Jason Woliner. It was released on FX on May 22, 2019.

The series is set in Staten Island, New York City. Like the 2014 film, the series follows the lives of vampires in the city. These consist of three vampires, Nandor, Laszlo, and Nadja. They live alongside Colin Robinson, an energy vampire; and Guillermo, Nandor's familiar. The series explores the absurdity and misfortunes experienced by the vampires. In the episode, the vampires must prepare to host the bi-annual vampire orgy, as their reputation relies on the execution.

According to Nielsen Media Research, the episode was seen by an estimated 0.434 million household viewers and gained a 0.19 ratings share among adults aged 18–49. The episode received positive reviews, who praised the humor, shock value and character development.

== Plot ==
The vampires have been selected to host the bi-annual vampire orgy, for which they have one week to prepare. The orgy is very respected among the vampires, as a bad orgy will result in humiliation. Nandor (Kayvan Novak) and Laszlo (Matt Berry) are fond of the orgies, but Nadja (Natasia Demetriou) is not as ecstatic.

While the vampires prepare, Guillermo (Harvey Guillén) is frustrated with the amount of demands needed for the orgy. Feeling that Laszlo and Nadja may mistreat him, Nandor accompanies him to a shop to buy stuff for the orgy, as well as to find virgins for the orgy. They run into Guillermo's friend, Jeremy (James Dwyer), who accepts to go to the party, unaware of the intention. Laszlo discovers his old pornos and shows them to Nadja, who is unenthusiastic. Nadja is not only uncomfortable with seeing her husband on pornos, but also considers them boring, describing them as "erotica for churchgoers." Laszlo leaves disappointed and refuses to attend the orgy.

New vampires arrive at the house just as the orgy will begin, with some of them taking an interest in Jeremy. Laszlo interrupts the beginning with a megaphone to profess his love for Nadja, much to the guests' chagrin. The guests start leaving, causing Nadja to unveil Jeremy as a last resort. However, Jeremy is caught having sex with a vampire, causing the guests to lose interest in him as he is not a virgin anymore. Afterwards, Nandor checks on Laszlo to see if he is okay. He opens the door, finding Laszlo and Nadja having sex on their bat forms, reconciled.

== Production ==
=== Development ===
In April 2019, FX confirmed that the ninth episode of the season would be titled "The Orgy", and that it would be written by consulting producer Marika Sawyer, and directed by Jason Woliner. This was Sawyer's first writing credit, and Woliner's second directing credit.

== Reception ==
=== Viewers ===
In its original American broadcast, "The Orgy" was seen by an estimated 0.434 million household viewers with a 0.18 in the 18-49 demographics. This means that 0.18 percent of all households with televisions watched the episode. This was a 17% decrease in viewership from the previous episode, which was watched by 0.522 million household viewers with a 0.19 in the 18-49 demographics.

With DVR factored in, the episode was watched by 1.16 million viewers with a 0.5 in the 18-49 demographics.

=== Critical reviews ===
"The Orgy" received positive reviews from critics. Katie Rife of The A.V. Club gave the episode a "B" grade and wrote, "The vampire as erotic symbol is a longstanding cultural trope, one that has borne such ripe, sexy fruit as David Bowie and Catherine Deneuve seducing Susan Sarandon in The Hunger. My affection for Nadja and Lazslo's mutual commitment to perversion is also on the record, and so the idea of a comedic take on the trope where the What We Do In The Shadows gang throws an orgy was extremely appealing to me. And the result? Mostly positive, but with a few questions."

Tony Sokol of Den of Geek gave the episode a 4.5 star rating out of 5 and wrote, "The Biannual Vampire Orgy is a success for the viewer because of its failure due to over-romanticism and spoiled virgins. What We do in the Shadows does what it does best in 'The Orgy.' It promises delights which the characters fully commit to only to have their dreams dry out before the first sip." Greg Wheeler of The Review Geek gave the episode a 4 star rating out of 5 and wrote, "More crude and explicit than the previous episodes, What We Do In The Shadows tries its hand at more provocative material to mixed effect. The humour does work quite well but it also feels a little misplaced compared to the other episodes. Still, What We Do In The Shadows' penultimate episode before next week's finale does feel a little bit like filler, despite some good jokes and a continuation of the vampire lore here."
