= I'll Be There (Ki-Yo album) =

Studio album by Kiyotaka (清貴)
- Released: July 25, 2001
- Recorded: 2000, 2001
- Genre: R&B, J-Pop, Pop
- Length: 65:16
- Label: EXPRESS

Kiyotaka (清貴) chronology
I'll Be There (2001)	The Remix EP (2003)

I'll Be There is the debut album of the Japanese singer Kiyotaka. The album was released by EXPRESS contains 13 songs and 1 hidden track.

This album includes his biggest hit single "The Only One", which was used in the Japanese TV drama Pure Soul (Kimi ga boku wo wasuretemo).

== Commercial performance ==
The album debuted at No. 7 on the Oricon Weekly Album Chart and became his only CD charted within No. 10 on the Oricon Charts.

== Track listing ==
1. "Opening"
2. "No No No"
3. "Lost child"
4. "Mirage"
5. "The Only One (Interlude)"
6. "True To Yourself"
7. "INSPIRE"
8. "VANISHING"
9. "Can You Feel The Same"
10. You're not alone"
11. "Dear Friend"
12. "freedom"
13. "The Only One (Orchestra Version)"
14. "Chain of Fools (Hidden Track)"

== Charts ==
Chart (2001)	Peak position
Oricon Albums Chart	7
