= According to Greta =

2009 film by Nancy Bardawil

- Theatrical release poster
- Directed by: Nancy Bardawil
- Written by: Michael Gilvary
- Produced by: Rick Rosenthal; Gary Dean Simpson; Douglas J. Sutherland
- Starring: Hilary Duff; Evan Ross; Melissa Leo; John Rothman; Maury Ginsberg; Michael Murphy; Ellen Burstyn
- Cinematography: Michael Lohmann
- Edited by: Michelle Botticelli
- Music by: John E. Nordstrom
- Production companies: Whitewater Films; Rafter H Entertainment; Anchor Bay Films; Greta Productions; West of Midnight
- Distributed by: Anchor Bay Entertainment; Whitewater Films
- Release dates: November 25, 2009 (Australia; DVD); December 11, 2009 (United States)
- Running time: 92 minutes
- Country: United States
- Language: English

According to Greta (released as Surviving Summer in the United Kingdom) is a 2009 American drama film directed by Nancy Bardawil and starring Hilary Duff, Evan Ross, Melissa Leo, Michael Murphy, and Ellen Burstyn.

== Plot ==
Greta is 17, a bright and beautiful young woman. She is also rebellious as a result of her turbulent home life. Pushed aside by her mother, Karen, who is on her third marriage, Greta is shipped off to her grandparents for the summer, staying with them in Ocean Grove, New Jersey. She is not happy about it and neither are the grandparents. She tells them that she fully intends to kill herself before the summer is over and compiles a notebook of suicide methods.

Greta's snarky attitude results in her being offered a job as a waitress at a local seafood restaurant. While working there, her odd sense of humor makes her attractive to many customers. Greta falls for a charismatic short-order cook named Julie. When he reveals to her that he was once in a juvenile correctional facility for stealing cars, Greta is even more attracted to him. Julie tells her that his experience made him determined to do something positive with his life and he attempts to convince Greta to not give up on hers. He is alarmed when he sees Greta's "suicide list".

The police come as a result of neighbors having seen Julie enter an upper story window. Julie demonstrates his respect for Greta when she attempts to lose her virginity to him. He tells her he will not be one of the things she checks off of her "to-do list" and that it has to be another time. At first the grandparents are upset with Julie for being there. Greta is called inside, and explains to her grandparents he was there at her request. The grandfather goes outside and squares things with the police. Julie tells the grandparents that he sincerely cares for Greta.

Although Greta's grandparents Katherine and Joseph are initially concerned about her boyfriend's criminal past, Julie proves himself worthy of their trust and demonstrates that he truly cares for Greta. Joseph tells him about Greta's father, who committed suicide in front of Greta when she was very young.

While the four are out sailing in Joseph's boat, Greta attempts to drown herself. Julie rescues her, but the fright still causes Katherine to have a mild heart attack. Katherine is given a positive prognosis by a doctor and she and her husband stay the night at a local hospital. Julie is mad at Greta, telling her that she should appreciate the life she has. The near catastrophe gives Greta a wake-up call and shows her how deeply her own actions affect those around her.

Once Katherine gets back from the hospital, Greta is determined to show her how sorry she is. Katherine is still furious, telling Greta she doesn't really know what she is sorry about. They have a heart-to-heart conversation, interrupted by Greta's mother and her current husband, who have come to take Greta to a summer boot camp. The grandparents are shocked at the mother's abrasive behavior.

Greta escapes to Julie who tells her that as messed up as she may be, a boot camp will never help her if she does not want to help herself. Julie's advice calms Greta and she returns to the house to find her mother has already packed up her things. Joseph arrives and interrupts them all telling Karen that Greta does not need a boot camp, she needs love, and that Greta and Karen will both be staying with them.

The three women bond looking at old pictures and the film ends with Greta leaving her suicide notebook in the ocean and in a voice over (letter to her mom) thanking her for letting her stay for the rest of the summer with her grandparents.

== Cast ==
- Hilary Duff as Greta Evelina O'Donnell
- Evan Ross as Julie Robinson
- Melissa Leo as Karen O'Donnell-Warner
- John Rothman as Edgar
- Maury Ginsberg as Lou Hirano
- Michael Murphy as Joseph O'Donnell
- Ellen Burstyn as Katherine O'Donnell
- Oren Skoog as Steve Warner
- Dave Shalansky as The Installer
- Christopher Hakim as Andrew
- Vivan Dugré as Donna Garcia

== Production ==
The film is based in Asbury Park, Ocean Grove and Neptune, according to Steve Gorelick of the New Jersey Motion Picture and Television Commission in Newark. "It's being made in the $1 to $2-million-dollar range", Gorelick said. Meanwhile, Kevin Chambers's home on Ocean Pathway in Ocean Grove was leased for the film production. Chambers had moved out of his home while the film crew rearranged and completed filming there. On October 13, 2007, film crews shut down the train station in Bradley Beach for shooting. The film finished full production in mid-November 2007. Later in May 2008 scenes were re-shot. The film name was changed to According to Greta for the American release, although shown earlier as "Greta" in a Los Angeles screening.

== Releases ==
According to Greta was first released in Australia on DVD on November 25, 2009. The film received a limited release in theatres across the United States on December 11, 2009, later followed by a DVD release on January 19, 2010 in the US, on March 12, 2010 in Germany, and on June 21, 2010 in the United Kingdom. The film was released under the alternative title Surviving Summer in the UK by Icon Home Entertainment.

The film had a rating of 1.25 million viewers on its December 28, 2011, broadcast on The CW, becoming the most watched film of the week.
