= James Ashcroft =

New Zealand director, actor, writer and producer

James Ashcroft (born 12 June 1978) is a New Zealand director, screenwriter, producer, and former actor. He had a career in theatre, film, television and radio, before moving to directing films. He has directed two films based on short stories by New Zealand writer Owen Marshall, and in 2025 directed The Whisper Man, starring Robert De Niro.

== Early life and education ==
Ashcroft was born to a Māori mother and an English father. He is of Ngāti Kahu and Ngāpuhi iwi (tribe) descent. He is the youngest of six siblings and grew up in Paraparaumu. He trained as an actor, and graduated from Victoria University and Toi Whakaari drama school. He served internships with theatre companies The Wooster Group in New York and Robert Lepage’s Ex Machina in Quebec.

== Career ==
Ashcroft has had a career in theatre, film, television and radio, including becoming the artistic director and chief executive of Māori theatre company Taki Rua Productions. Ashcroft's work as an actor includes roles in The Insider’s Guide to Love (2005), Black Sheep (2006) and Fresh Meat (2012). He has directed multiple short films.

In the early 2010s, he optioned two of New Zealand short story writer Owen Marshall's stories, "Coming Home in the Dark" and "The Rule of Jenny Pen". In 2014 Ashcroft formed Light in the Dark Productions Ltd to develop adaptations of New Zealand literary works into feature films, shorts and documentaries.

In 2021, he directed Coming Home in the Dark, a psychological thriller based on Marshall's short story of the same name. Ashcroft co-wrote the film with Eli Kent. It stars Daniel Gillies, Erik Thomson, Miriama McDowell and Matthias Luafutu. The film premiered at the Sundance Film Festival.

Review aggregator Rotten Tomatoes gave the film a 92% approval rating from 63 reviews. The critical consensus reads: "Smart, well-acted, and above all scary, Coming Home in the Dark finds first-time director James Ashcroft making his mark with a white-knuckle ride for horror fans.

In 2024 he directed The Rule of Jenny Pen, a psychological horror film based on Marshall's short story of the same name. It was co-written by Ashcroft and Eli Kent, and stars John Lithgow, Geoffrey Rush, and George Henare. The film was shown at Fantastic Fest on 19 September 2024, where Ashcroft won the best director award. It was shown at Sitges Film Festival in October 2024, where Lithgow and Rush were jointly awarded best actor.

Rotten Tomatoes gave the film a 73% approval rating from 95 reviews. The critical consensus reads "John Lithgow's frighteningly unhinged performance reigns over The Rule of Jenny Pen, a nasty chiller that's by turns monotonous and haunting". The Guardian called it a "bracingly malicious tale of elder abuse". Novelist Stephen King tweeted “I watched one of the best movies I’ve seen this year. It’s called The Rule of Jenny Pen, and I urge you to watch it...”.

In 2025, Ashcroft began directing an adaptation of Alex North's novel, The Whisper Man, starring Robert De Niro. The Netflix film was set to have a budget of US$50 million, and was released in 2026. His next film will be When Darkness Loves Us, based on a novella by Elizabeth Engstrom, starring Emilia Clarke, and filmed in New Zealand. He also has the rights to Stephen King's novella Danny Coughlin’s Bad Dream.

Ashcroft says he is drawn to dark subject matter. “I enjoy playing in the dark,” he says. “I want to open up the audience’s mouths with screams, or laughter, and then stick something serious down their throat to digest afterwards.”

== Personal life ==
Ashcroft is married with three young children. He lives in Mount Maunganui.

== Filmography ==
Director

- Coming Home in the Dark (2021)
- The Rule of Jenny Pen (2024)
- The Whisper Man (2026)
- When Darkness Loves Us (2027)
