= The House Guest =

- The Vampire Diaries episode
- Episode no.: Season 2 Episode 16
- Directed by: Michael Katleman
- Written by: Caroline Dries
- Cinematography by: Paul M. Sommers
- Editing by: Joshua Butler; Michael H. Friedlander
- Production code: 2J5266
- Original air date: February 24, 2011

Guest appearances
- Daniel Gillies as Elijah Mikaelson; Bryton James as Luka Martin; Randy J. Goodwin as Jonas Martin

Episode chronology
← Previous "The Dinner Party"	Next → "Know Thy Enemy"
- The Vampire Diaries season 2

"The House Guest" is the sixteenth episode of the second season of the American supernatural teen drama television series The Vampire Diaries, and the 38th of the series. It aired on The CW on February 24, 2011. The episode was written by supervising producer Caroline Dries and directed by Michael Katleman.

== Plot ==
Katherine (Nina Dobrev) is free and out of the tomb now that Elijah (Daniel Gillies) is dead and she moves into the Salvatore house where she stays with Damon (Ian Somerhalder) and Stefan (Paul Wesley). She tells them that she did not leave town because she wants to help them kill Klaus, something that the two brothers do not seem to believe.

Damon tries to burn Elijah's body so he can take the dagger but it is not working. Katherine informs him that he is wasting his time and when he asks her if she knew that the dagger would kill him if he had used it, Katherine admits that she did know and that she made a deal with Isobel to get out of the tomb. The deal was to stay and help with Klaus but one of them, Damon or Stefan, had to die and she chose to save Stefan.

Stefan informs Bonnie (Kat Graham) and Jeremy (Steven R. McQueen) about Katherine and asks Bonnie if she can talk to the Martins and make them work with them. Jonas (Randy J. Goodwin) and Luka (Bryton James) meet Stefan and Bonnie to talk but they refuse to work with them. Bonnie and Stefan find out though that Elijah did not have a weapon to kill Klaus but if a witch can channel enough power, they would not need a weapon. That leads the Salvatores to try to find out the place where many witches were murdered in the past to use their power.

Elena, Bonnie and Caroline (Candice Accola) organize a girls’ night since Caroline broke up with Matt (Zach Roerig) and Jonas took Bonnie's powers. Jenna (Sara Canning) joins them since Alaric (Matt Davis) broke up with her. They all decide to go to the Grill where Caroline gets back with Matt and Bonnie asks Elena if she is fine with her dating Jeremy. Elena agrees with their relationship.

Jonas and Luka return home and they try to free Elijah using a magic spell that transfers Luka to the Salvatore basement. Luka tries to remove the dagger from Elijah's body but Katherine realizes that something is wrong and she stops him. Luka stabs her with a wooden stick and she calls Damon for help who runs into the basement and burns Luka killing him. Jonas goes after Elena to avenge Luka's death.

Jonas looks for Elena at the Grill but Bonnie tells him that she is not there. Stefan arrives with Katherine who pretends to be Elena to get Jonas' attention, so Elena can escape. Matt tries to help Caroline but Jonas stabs him in the neck with a broken bottle and Caroline is forced to give him her blood to save him. Stefan gets to Elena's home with Katherine where Jonas is waiting for Elena and Katherine kills him. Before he dies, Jonas grabs Bonnie giving her powers back and showing her how she can kill Klaus.

Matt wakes up at Caroline's house not knowing what happened. Caroline tries to explain him that her blood healed him since she is a vampire and that she will tell him all the truth about it. Matt freaks out and realizes that Vicky was not crazy when she was talking about vampires before she died and he leaves believing that Caroline and the vampires did something to Vicky.

The episode ends with Isobel's (Mia Kirshner) return and her going to Jenna's house. She introduces herself as Alaric's ex-wife, something that shocks Jenna since a few moments ago Alaric was telling her once again that Isobel is dead.

== Featured music ==
In "The House Guest" we can hear the songs:

- "Hello Miss Heels" by S.O. Stereo
- "I'll Take the Bullet" by S.O. Stereo
- "Broken Strings" by James Morrison & Nelly Furtado
- "Epiphany" by Angel Taylor
- ”Eternal Flame” by The Bangles

== Reception ==
=== Ratings ===
In its original American broadcast, "The House Guest" was watched by 2.98 million; down by 0.09 from the previous episode.

=== Reviews ===
"The House Guest" received positive reviews.

Emma Fraser from TV Overmind gave the episode an A rating saying: "Some great performance tonight in a jam packed episode that expanded the mythology further and cut the cast down again with a couple of timely deaths. There are enough cliffhangers to definitely leave me clamouring for more and wonder why April 7th is so far, far away, really stellar work from this consistently brilliant show."

E. Reagan of The TV Chick gave the episode an A− rating saying that the episode was interesting, solid and pretty great end for the mid-season finale and opened a ton of interesting doors for the upcoming episodes.

Carrie Raisler from The A.V. Club gave the episode a B+ rating. "If I had to pick one word to describe The Vampire Diaries’ storytelling style, it would probably be “more.” More plot, more romance, more schemes, more forward movement, more deaths, more angst, more, more, more. Handled poorly, this philosophy could be disastrous. Thankfully, the writers have somehow managed to make this path of excess work in their favor, and tonight was no exception."

Matt Richenthal of TV Fanatic rated the episode with 4.9/5 saying that the episode did not waste any time to get into action and that it was like a horror movie "as it packed violent deaths, a roaring fire, shocking admissions and a surprise return into just one hour."

Diana Steenbergen from IGN rated the episode with 8/10 saying that the truth came out this week since Matt found out about Caroline being a vampire and Jenna found out that Isobel is not dead. "On this show, you need to be careful what you wish for when you say you want to know the truth."

Meg of Two Cents TV gave a good review to the episode saying that it was a great one and "a night of exes and oh’s (as in “oh em gee!”) tonight, as Operation Kill Klaus gets sidetracked by an epic inferno."

Despite the positive reviews, Robin Franson Pruter from Forced Viewing rated the episode with 1/4 saying that the episode was a mess and that "writers dump a hodgepodge of stuff they need to get out of the way before they start working toward the season finale."
