= The Last Dance (The Vampire Diaries) =

- The Vampire Diaries episode
- Episode no.: Season 2 Episode 18
- Directed by: John Behring
- Written by: Michael Narducci
- Cinematography by: Paul M. Sommers
- Editing by: Lance Anderson
- Production code: 2J5268
- Original air date: April 14, 2011

Guest appearances
- Daniel Gillies as Elijah Mikaelson; Marguerite MacIntyre as Liz Forbes; Gino Anthony Pesi as Maddox

Episode chronology
← Previous "Know Thy Enemy"	Next → "Klaus"
- The Vampire Diaries season 2

"The Last Dance" is the eighteenth episode of the second season of the American supernatural teen drama television series The Vampire Diaries, and the 40th of the series. It aired on The CW on April 14, 2011. The episode was written by executive story editor Michael Narducci and directed by supervising producer John Behring.

== Plot ==
Klaus, who is in Alaric's (Matt Davis) body, keeps Katherine (Nina Dobrev) trapped in the apartment and he compels her to tell him everything she knows about Elena, the Salvatore brothers and their plans to kill him.

Elena signs the papers to get Stefan (Paul Wesley) and Damon's (Ian Somerhalder) house where she can be safe from vampires and then she leaves for school with Bonnie (Kat Graham) and Stefan despite Damon's objection. Klaus arrives at school pretending to be Alaric. Matt (Zach Roerig) does not know how to act around Caroline (Candice Accola) since he has to pretend that he does not remember anything of what she told him. Liz (Marguerite MacIntyre) asks him to do whatever Caroline asks him and not make her understand that he knows so he can buy her some time to see what she can do.

A girl at school asks Elena on behalf of a guy, if she will go to the high school dance. When Elena says that she will go with her boyfriend, the girl tells her that the guy's name is Klaus. Elena and Bonnie realize that the girl is compelled and they inform Stefan and Damon about it. Alaric/Klaus is also there when Bonnie reassures them that she has enough power and can take Klaus down. Klaus returns to Alaric's apartment where Maddox (Gino Anthony Pesi) tells him that Bonnie cannot use all that power without killing herself and advises Klaus to provoke her to use that power.

At the high school dance Jeremy (Steven R. McQueen) worries about Bonnie and tries to change her mind but Bonnie tells him not to worry. Elena, Stefan and Damon also arrive and they all get inside trying to find where Klaus is, something that is not easy since they do not know how he looks like.

Damon hears Bonnie and Jeremy talk and he finds out that Bonnie will die if she uses her power. Jeremy tells Stefan about it and Stefan tells Elena. Elena tries to talk to Bonnie to convince her not to do it and that they can find another way to kill Klaus but Bonnie is determined to do it herself. At the same time, Klaus compels three students to attack Jeremy as a distraction to get close to Elena.

Alaric/Klaus takes Elena and Bonnie away and reveals them that he is Klaus. Bonnie fights him and then they run away where they find Damon. Damon asks Elena to go to Stefan and Bonnie tells Damon that Klaus has a protection spell and that he tries to kill her by making her use her power. Damon asks if she is still determined to do anything and Bonnie agrees, making her go back and fight Klaus. Elena and Stefan try to stop Bonnie but they cannot. Bonnie collapses while fighting Klaus and when Elena and Stefan get near her, she is dead. Elena is devastated by her death and Damon asks Stefan to take her home while he will deal with Bonnie's body.

Damon returns home finding Elena crying. He explains to her that Klaus needed to believe that Bonnie is dead otherwise he would not stop and he tells her that Bonnie cast a spell to make her death believable but she is fine now and with Jeremy. Jeremy took Bonnie to the house where the witches were burned to hide her in the basement from Klaus and when she wakes up and she is fine and well. Jeremy stays with her to keep her company till they need to get out again.

The episode ends with Elena telling Damon that she will not let Bonnie die and that they have to find another way to kill Klaus. After their conversation, Elena heads to the basement where she removes the dagger from Elijah (Daniel Gillies) to bring him back to life.

== Feature music ==
In "The Last Dance" we can hear the songs:

- "Last Kiss" by Pearl Jam
- "Spotlight (Oh Nostalgia)" by Patrick Stump
- "Dedicated to the One I Love" by The Mamas & the Papas
- "I Think We're Alone Now" by The Birthday Massacre
- "Dream Lover" by The Dollyrots
- “Hush” by Kula Shaker

== Reception ==
=== Ratings ===
In its original American broadcast, "The Last Dance" was watched by 2.81 million; up by 0.08 from the previous episode.

=== Reviews ===
"The Last Dance" received positive reviews.

Emma Fraser from TV Overmind gave the episode an A rating saying that it was a spectacular week and that she was completely thrown by the emotional roller coaster that took place in the episode. "After the duplicity of last week and the declaration of full disclosure at the start of the hour, there were just as many tricks and turns that you would expect from this show."

Carrie Raisler of The A.V. Club gave the episode a B+ rating saying that it was another extremely entertaining episode. "Aside from a few quick action sequences, this was an hour filled with emotion and devotion, and that's what ended up making it kind of beautiful."

E. Reagan from The TV Chick gave the episode a B+ rating saying that it was a solid one. "The previews had me worried this was going to be a "Swim Team" episode, but I was pleasantly surprised. We had some good movement forward in the plot."

Diana Steenbergen of IGN rated the episode with 9/10 saying that there were many things going on but one of the best things was Matt Davis' performance of Klaus masquerading as Alaric.. "Between [Klaus'] smug infiltration of the Salvatore mansion, where he casually listened to the "secret" plan for Bonnie to kill him, and his cocky attitude toward Alaric's life in general, Davis had fun and made the most of this turn of events for his character."

Steve Marsi from TV Fanatic rated the episode with 4.5/5 saying that overall was a strong episode "with an eerie suspense surrounding Klaus and plenty of emotion as the characters reacted to forces influencing them and to each other."

Robin Franson Pruter of Forced Viewing rated the episode with 3/4 saying that the episode is exciting to watch. "It nicely interlaces plot movement with character development and relationship exploration, and it provides anticipation for the episodes to come."
