= Crying Wolf =

- The Vampire Diaries episode
- Episode no.: Season 2 Episode 14
- Directed by: David Von Ancken
- Written by: Brian Young
- Cinematography by: Paul M. Sommers
- Editing by: Sean Albertson
- Production code: 2J5264
- Original air date: February 10, 2011

Guest appearances
- David Anders as John Gilbert; Michaela McManus as Jules; Daniel Gillies as Elijah Mikaelson; Stephen Amell as Brady; Dawn Olivieri as Andie Star; Erik Stocklin as Stevie; Bryton James as Luka Martin

Episode chronology
← Previous "Daddy Issues"	Next → "The Dinner Party"
- The Vampire Diaries season 2

"Crying Wolf" is the fourteenth episode of the second season of the American supernatural teen drama television series The Vampire Diaries, and the 36th of the series. It aired on The CW on February 10, 2011. The episode was written by story editor Brian Young and directed by David Von Ancken.

== Plot ==
The episode starts with Jules (Michaela McManus) and Brady (Stephen Amell) burning the bodies of the dead werewolves so people will not find them. Another werewolf, Stevie (Erik Stocklin), is also there who informs them that Mason was looking for the moonstone to break the curse of the sun and the moon and explains that if the vampires break it then they will be able to walk in the sun but if the werewolves do it, then they will be able to turn whenever they want (even never) and not be forced to do it only at the full moon. Jules and Brady decide that they have to find the moonstone and everything that is needed to break the curse, including Elena (Nina Dobrev), and they ask Tyler's (Michael Trevino) help.

Elena wants to get away from everything for a while, so she goes away with Stefan (Paul Wesley) for a romantic weekend at her parents' house near the lake. When they get there, Elena remembers her parents and memories of them at the house come back to her mind. Stefan is there for her and they later find out a secret place where Elena's parents were hiding vampire weapons as well as other Gilbert journals.

Damon (Ian Somerhalder) meets Elijah (Daniel Gillies) at the tea party Carol (Susan Walters) is organizing and tries to find out his plans and why he wants to keep Elena safe at the moment but Elijah does not seem willing to share his plans. At the same time, Bonnie (Kat Graham), with the help of Caroline (Candice Accola) and Jeremy (Steven R. McQueen), uses her magic to force Luka (Bryton James) tell her about Elijah's plans.

Damon gets back to the Salvatore house with Alaric (Matt Davis) and they try to figure out what Elijah wants and how they are going to kill him. Alaric has to meet Jenna (Sara Canning) and gets up to leave, but on his way out he gets stabbed from a werewolf and Stevie drugs Damon. The werewolves tie Damon up and they start torturing him so he will tell them where the moonstone is. Damon does not tell them anything when Elijah appears with the moonstone. He challenges the werewolves to take it and he kills all of them while Jules runs away. Before he leaves, he tells Damon once again to keep Elena safe.

Tyler arrives at the Grill bar where Caroline is and manages to get her phone without her noticing him. Tyler uses Caroline's phone to text Elena so he can learn where she is and then he informs Brady that Elena is at the lake with Stefan. Brady and Tyler head to the lake so they can capture her. When they get there, Brady shoots Stefan and asks Tyler to keep him down while he will go to get Elena. When Brady leaves, Stefan informs Tyler what Brady and the other werewolves really need Elena for since they have to kill her to break the curse and Tyler feels bad since he did not know about that detail. Brady chases Elena who manages to escape from him till the moment Stefan appears and kills him. Tyler apologizes to Elena because he did not know what they would do to her and that is why he helped them and Elena forgives him.

Bonnie, Jeremy and Caroline manage to get the information they need from Luka; that Elijah plans to break the curse on his own so he can kill Klaus who will be weakened right after the sacrifice. Luka and his father just help him because Klaus has his sister and they just want to take her back. Bonnie calls Damon to tell him that Elijah plans to kill Elena after all and Damon calls Stefan to inform him about it. Stefan tells Elena who does not seem surprised and tells him that Elijah agreed to keep her friends and family safe and not her as well. Stefan is mad at Elena for making such kind of a deal and he leaves.

Bonnie and Jeremy get together while Tyler meets Matt (Zach Roerig) at the bar to tell him that Caroline loves him and she needs him and that he should not be mad at her. He admits to him that she helped him during a difficult period but there was nothing between them and he leaves. Tyler also leaves a note to his mother and then leaves town with Jules.

== Featured music ==
"Crying Wolf" contains the songs:

- "Family Tree" by Matthew West
- "You Wait For Rain" by Kyler England
- "Manipulating Woman" by Ladyhawke
- "All Die Young" by Smith Westerns
- "All I Know" by Free Energy

== Reception ==
=== Ratings ===
In its original American broadcast, "Crying Wolf" was watched by 2.78 million, down by 0.44 from the previous episode.

=== Reviews ===
"Crying Wolf" received positive reviews.

Emma Fraser of TV Overmind gave the episode an A rating, saying that it was "Another strong outing [episode] from the show that just doesn’t slow down even when romantic getaways are thrown in to the mix."

E. Reagan from The TV Chick gave the episode an A− rating, saying that it was another awesome episode and the show continues to impress with how good it is.

Carrie Raisler from The A.V. Club gave the episode a B+ rating, saying that "overall, [the episode] was a very strong sequence for the characters and featured some tight and suspenseful direction. Good stuff, all around."

Matt Richenthal of TV Fanatic rated the episode a 4.6/5, saying that it was an episode "with a lot of heart".

Diana Steenbergen from IGN rated the episode an 8.5/10, stating that "the plot revolving around the curse on vampires and werewolves is growing increasingly twisty", and that this is something the show excels at. Steenbergen also praised Daniel Gillies, saying that he continues to do a great job as Elija; "He is cool under pressure and menacing without seeming to try. He barely broke a sweat shrugging off Damon's attempt to intimidate him, and his offer of a handkerchief for Damon to wipe up the blood was a nice touch."

Robin Franson Pruter of Forced Viewing rated the episode a 3/4, saying that the storylines begin to come together in this "enjoyable, if overly violent, episode." Pruter praises Candice Accola's acting, saying that she steals every scene she's in," but criticizes the violence of the episode. "On the whole, this episode, despite the gratuitous violence and the mystifying Tyler departure, provides an excellent level of story development and execution for an ordinary episode from the middle of a season."

Meg from Two Cents TV gave a positive review to the episode, saying that it was a good one.
