= The Dinner Party (The Vampire Diaries) =

- The Vampire Diaries episode
- Episode no.: Season 2 Episode 15
- Directed by: Marcos Siega
- Written by: Andrew Chambliss
- Cinematography by: Paul M. Sommers
- Editing by: Lance Anderson
- Production code: 2J5265
- Original air date: February 17, 2011

Guest appearances
- David Anders as John Gilbert; Daniel Gillies as Elijah Mikaelson; Bryton James as Luka Martin; Randy J. Goodwin as Jonas Martin; Dawn Olivieri as Andie Star; Arielle Kebbel as Lexi Branson

Episode chronology
← Previous "Crying Wolf"	Next → "The House Guest"
- The Vampire Diaries season 2

"The Dinner Party" is the fifteenth episode of the second season of the American supernatural teen drama television series The Vampire Diaries, and the 37th of the series. It aired on The CW on February 17, 2011. The episode was written by executive story editor Andrew Chambliss and directed by co-executive producer Marcos Siega.

== Plot ==
Elena (Nina Dobrev) and Stefan (Paul Wesley) are still at the Gilberts' lake house where Elena reads Jonathan's new journal she and Stefan found in the secret room of the house. Stefan is still mad at her for her decision to sacrifice herself to save her family and friends. While reading, Elena finds out that Stefan attacked Jonathan and tried to kill him but Jonathan did not die because of the Gilbert ring. Stefan starts telling Elena about his life after he first turned into a vampire and how different he was than he is now.

Damon (Ian Somerhalder) plans to kill Elijah (Daniel Gillies) with the dagger that John (David Anders) gave him and he informs Stefan about it but they both hide it from Elena. Damon is at the Grill with Alaric (Matt Davis) and Andie (Dawn Olivieri) when Elijah comes in with Jenna (Sara Canning). Damon gets the opportunity and invites Elijah and everyone for dinner at the Salvatore house.

Before the dinner, Damon visits Katherine at the tomb to let her know that he is going to kill Elijah and asks her if it is possible to kill an Original. Katherine says that there is no way he can kill Elijah but seems to change her mind when Damon mentions he has a dagger and the ash from an old oak tree and she starts begging him not to kill Elijah otherwise she will be stuck forever in the tomb since Elijah compelled her. She also offers to help them kill Klaus if Damon helps her get out of the tomb. Damon realizes from her reaction that the dagger can really kill an Original and leaves, leaving her behind.

Jeremy (Steven R. McQueen) and Bonnie (Kat Graham) hang out at the Grill and Jeremy tries to ask Bonnie to come for dinner after they kissed when Luka (Bryton James) shows up and asks what they did to him. Bonnie pretends that she does not understand what he is talking about and when he gets persistent, Jeremy asks him to leave. Bonnie tells Jeremy that she has to practice so she can get stronger and Jeremy tells her that he can help her and Bonnie agrees to meet him later at his house.

Back at the lake house, Stefan keeps telling Elena about his first years as a vampire and how he met Lexi (Arielle Kebbel) who helped him become a better vampire. Elena keeps reading the journal and she finds out that Jonathan was trying to find a way to kill an Original. In the journal, there is a mention about the dagger and how it works and that it should be only used by a human, otherwise, if a vampire tries to kill another vampire with it, then both will die. Stefan realizes that John gave the dagger to Damon to use it because he wants to kill Damon as well and immediately tries to call Damon and warn him about it.

At the same time in the Salvatore house, Damon is getting ready to kill Elijah when Alaric interrupts him since he got a phone call from Stefan who told him about the dagger. Alaric stops Damon's plan who wants to know why and Alaric tells him about the dagger, who is mad that he can not use it. As they all get ready for dessert, Alaric gets the opportunity and kills Elijah himself in front of everyone (except Jenna) and asks Damon to hide his body before Jenna sees it.

Elena is upset because Stefan and Damon did not tell her what they were planning to do but Stefan tells her that she also did not tell them about her willing to sacrifice herself and tries to convince her to fight for her survival. He uses his story with Lexi and how Lexi helped him to come out of the darkness he was through love and fought for his survival. Later on, Elena continues reading the journal where it says that for the Original to remain dead, the dagger should not be removed. Stefan rushes to call Damon but when Damon goes to check on Elijah's body, the body is gone. Elijah is mad and goes to Jonas (Randy J. Goodwin) demanding to find where is Elena immediately.

Bonnie gets to Jeremy's house to find out that Jeremy has prepared a romantic dinner for the two of them. She makes sure to him that she liked what happened between them but she prefers to talk to Elena first before anything more happens. Jeremy accepts what she says and Bonnie starts practicing her magic while Jeremy is there. Their session gets interrupted when Jonas breaks into the house and demands to know what they did to his son and what Luka has told them. Bonnie is forced to tell him and then Jonas leave but not before he takes Bonnie's powers.

Elijah shows up at the lake house to take Elena but Elena tries to make the same deal she did with him before; that she will go with him if he promises to keep her family and friends safe. Elijah does not seem to agree and Elena threatens to kill herself and become a vampire, just like Katherine did, something the will make her useless for him. Elijah calls her bluff but Elena moves on and stabs herself in the stomach. Elijah freaks out, accepts the deal and asks her to let him heal her. When he gets close enough, Elena stabs him with the dagger and Elijah falls dead. Stefan gives Elena his blood to heal her and Damon is also there reminding to not remove the dagger from the body.

Stefan and Damon take Elijah's body to the Salvatore cellar and Elena promises that she will fight for her survival but makes a deal with the brothers that they will not hide anything from her anymore and that from now on they will do whatever it takes to kill Klaus but they will do it her way. Damon and Stefan agree.

In the meantime, Jenna asks Alaric about his dead wife but Alaric refuses to tell her anything more than he already did. Jenna realizes that John was right and that Alaric is not honest with her and she leaves mad. John, who heard the whole conversation, tells Alaric that he can fix this if he wants him to. Alaric declines his offer and gives him back the Gilbert ring, since it is what John wants from him, and tells him that he will need it more than him after trying to kill Damon.

The episode ends with Damon finding Katherine in his room having a shower. He is shocked seeing her there but Katherine explains that when an Original dies then their compulsion wears off and that is how she was able to get out of the tomb and she knew that if she begged him not to kill Elijah Damon would do the exact opposite. Damon realizes that she tricked him but Katherine says that she is still there because she wants to help them kill Klaus.

== Feature music ==
In "The Dinner Party" we can hear the songs:

- "Happiness Is Overrated" by The Airborne Toxic Event
- "Lemonworld" by The National
- "When I Grow Old" by Pet Lions
- "Pumped Up Kicks" by Foster the People
- "Islands" by The xx

== Reception ==
=== Ratings ===
In its original American broadcast, "The Dinner Party" was watched by 3.07 million; up by 0.29 from the previous episode.

=== Reviews ===
"The Dinner Party" received positive reviews.

Emma Fraser of TV Overmind gave the episode and A+ rating. "This episode was full of tension, shocks and propelled the vampire story forward, making the werewolf business seem like an age ago. The flashbacks worked effectively and allowed us to see ‘bad’ Stefan and the return of Lexi."

Carrie Raisler from The A.V. Club gave an A− rating to the episode saying that it was "one heck of an episode" praising the acting of Daniel Gillies as Elijah; "Tonight’s episode was an absolute showcase for the fabulousness that is Elijah, full of all of the snark and threats we’ve come to love".

Robin Franson Pruter of Forced Viewing rated the episode with 4/4 saying that it was an engrossing and entertaining episode that did almost everything well. "The episode’s surprising final revelation manages not to be a letdown after the exciting showdown between Elijah and Elena and effectively sets up the conflict for the next episode. Much of "The Dinner Party" works very well [...] The scenes are entertaining. The story is interesting. And, for most of the episode, the plot develops organically out of the nature and behavior of the characters."

Matt Richenthal from TV Fanatic rated the episode with 4.7/5 saying that the episode was exciting. "Typically, The Vampire Diaries saves its biggest cliffhanger for last. On "The Dinner Party," however, there were twists and turns around every commercial corner."

Diana Steenbergen of IGN rated the episode with 9/10 saying that the show outdid itself this week. "Each week I find myself wondering how they can keep the twists coming, episode after episode, but they always seem to find a way."
