= Massive Theatre Company =

Theatre company in Auckland

- Type: Theatre group
- Artistic director: Sam Scott
- Website: http://www.massivecompany.co.nz/

Massive Theatre Company, also called Massive or Massive Company, is a professional theatre company in Auckland, Aotearoa New Zealand.

Founded by Artistic Director Samantha Scott MNZM in 1991, the Maidment Youth Theatre at the University of Auckland. was later renamed Massive Theatre Company - a fusion company of emerging and professional artists.

Massive is a professional physical ensemble company, creating new theatre with emerging and professional actors, directors and writers. Its work comes from real stories that reflect the rich diversity of Aotearoa.

Massive is also a leading company in developing both emerging and professional artists. Through access to free workshops and ongoing mentoring/training, emerging artists are able to become a part of the company from age fifteen and stay involved throughout their professional career.

With productions like The Sons of Charlie Paora, 2015's The Brave and I LOVE YOU G (2024), the company has "brought challenging topics affecting young Polynesians to the stage". It has also provided career development for actors such as Miriama McDowell, Anapela Polataivao, Beulah Koale and Wesley Dowdell.

== Production history ==
In 2004, the company took The Sons of Charlie Paora, written by Lennie James, to the Royal Court Theatre in London.

In 2011, the company produced the world premiere of a commissioned play by Lennie James, Havoc in the Garden. The play, directed by Sam Scott, was performed at three Auckland venues, the Herald Theatre at the Aotea Centre, Māngere Arts Centre and Takapuna's Pumphouse.

In 2017, the company's The Wholehearted was nominated for the Excellence Award in Ensemble Performance at the Wellington Theatre Awards. The Wholehearted was created as a celebration of Massive Theatre Company's 25th anniversary in 2016. The play was directed by Sam Scott and Scotty Cotter, and featured a cast of seven: Bree Peters, Renee Lyons, Kura Forrester, Pat Tafa, Denyce Su'a, Theo David and Villa Lemanu. It played at Māngere Arts Centre, Q Theatre Loft and Herald Theatre in Auckland, Hannah Playhouse in Wellington and Iona College in Hawkes Bay between March 2016 and September 2017.

In 2018, the company produced Sightings, written by Fiona Graham, Miriama McDowell and Denyce Su'a.

Productions from 2019-2026 include: Half of the Sky (2019-23), Like a River (2019), Babble (2020), Te Whare Kapua (2021), What We're Made Of (2022), Heart Go... BOOM! (2023), I Love You G (2024), Home Made (2026).
