= Know Thy Enemy =

- The Vampire Diaries episode
- Episode no.: Season 2 Episode 17
- Directed by: Wendey Stanzler
- Written by: Mike Daniels
- Cinematography by: Paul M. Sommers
- Editing by: Sean Albertson
- Production code: 2J5267
- Original air date: April 7, 2011

Guest appearances
- Mia Kirshner as Isobel Flemming; David Anders as John Gilbert; Marguerite MacIntyre as Liz Forbes; Bryton James as Luka Martin; Gino Anthony Pesi as Maddox

Episode chronology
| ← Previous "The House Guest" | Next → "The Last Dance" |
- The Vampire Diaries season 2

"Know Thy Enemy" is the seventeenth episode of the second season of the American supernatural teen drama television series The Vampire Diaries, and the 39th of the series. It aired on The CW on April 7, 2011. The episode was written by co-producer Mike Daniels and directed by Wendey Stanzler.

== Plot ==
Isobel (Mia Kirshner) is at Elena's house asking her to invite her in so they can talk but Elena (Nina Dobrev) refuses to do it. Jenna (Sara Canning) is shocked when she finds out that Isobel is alive and that Elena knew. Elena tries to talk to her but Jenna does not want to hear her.

Elena calls Stefan (Paul Wesley), Damon (Ian Somerhalder) and Alaric (Matt Davis) to inform them about what happened. Katherine advises Stefan and Damon not to let Isobel and John know that she is still in town while Alaric arrives at Elena’s house. He tries to talk to Jenna but Jenna does not want to hear him either and leaves the house.

Caroline (Candice Accola) worries about Matt (Zach Roerig) who disappeared after she told him the truth and she tries to contact him but he is not answering his phone. Matt goes to Sheriff Liz Forbes (Marguerite MacIntyre) and asks to see Vicky's file, accusing the Sheriff for covering the real cause of her death. Sheriff threatens to arrest him and she takes him to her home to calm down. Caroline comes home and finds him there. Matt asks her to tell him the whole truth.

John (David Anders) invites Isobel into Elena’s house and convinces Elena and Stefan to listen to what she has to say about Klaus. Isobel tells them that no one knows where Klaus really is but there are rumors about the doppelganger’s existence and that will make every vampire who wants to reach Klaus search for Elena. Isobel offers Elena to stay in a house she has in Elena's name so she can be safe since no vampire can get in without her permission. Elena denies her offer but that gives the idea to Stefan and Damon to put the deed to their house in Elena’s name so she can be safe there.

Damon, Bonnie (Kat Graham) and Jeremy (Steven R. McQueen) go to the Martins house and get the Grimoire books they need. Bonnie tells Damon that she knows how to channel the power from the dead witches but they have to find the spot where they were burned. Damon already knows where the place is and the three of them go there where Bonnie channels the power.

Isobel returns to the house she stays in and Katherine is there waiting for her. The two of them seem very close and Isobel informs Katherine that she managed to find a witch who is in the trusted circle of Klaus and she made a deal to save Katherine's life if they deliver the moonstone and the doppelganger to him. That makes Katherine turn against the Salvatores once again and she finds and steals the moonstone.

Isobel creates a distraction at the Lockwood house to give Katherine the time to take Elena's place. Isobel leaves with Elena and Stefan leaves with Katherine believing that is Elena but he recognizes her and asks where Elena is. Katherine injects him with vervain and she goes back to Isobel’s house. She calls Isobel but Isobel apologizes to her telling her that Klaus wanted Katherine and she could not do anything about it. She hangs up the phone and Maddox (Gino Anthony Pesi), Klaus' witch, who was waiting in the house, knocks down Katherine.

Jeremy finds out that if Bonnie uses the power she channeled from the dead witches to kill Klaus, then she will die too. The two of them fight but Bonnie tells him that it is her decision to make and that he cannot tell Elena about it. Caroline tells Matt everything but Matt asks her to make him forget since it is too much for him. Caroline compels him but it is revealed a little bit later that Sheriff Forbes asked Matt to take vervain so he can remember what Caroline would tell him without her knowing that she could not compel him. Matt meets Liz and tells her everything.

Isobel takes Elena to her grave and while they are talking, Isobel gets a phone call from Maddox who tells her that he has the moonstone and Katherine. Klaus has everything he needs at the moment and Isobel can let Elena go. Isobel apologizes to Elena for what she has done to her, she removes her necklace that protects her from the sun and she gets burned in front of Elena.

The episode ends with Katherine waking up in Alaric's apartment where Maddox casts a spell at Alaric's body. Maddox has summoned Klaus who is now in Alaric's body.

== Feature music ==
In "Know Thy Enemy" we can hear the songs:

- "Halfway Gone" by Piano Tribute Players
- "Give Me Strength" by Snow Patrol

== Reception ==
=== Ratings ===
In its original American broadcast, "Know Thy Enemy" was watched by 2.73 million; down by 0.25 from the previous episode.

=== Reviews ===
"Know Thy Enemy" received positive reviews.

E. Reagan from The TV Chick gave the episode an A rating saying that the show gets better and better. "I think they hit some amazing emotional notes today about the concepts of family and loyalty, and it was just so well done."

Emma Fraser of TV Overmind gave the episode and A− rating saying that "with all that double crossing and secrets revealed it is clear that this show is back in a big way. Now that Klaus is here, albeit in the body of Alaric it really does feel that the endgame of the season is coming in to fruition."

Carrie Raisler from The A.V. Club gave the episode a B+ rating saying that overall the episode was really strong and the show "has returned [from the six weeks hiatus] in fine form, with an hour packed full of emotion, story progression and, of course, double crosses. Mystic Falls is by far the double-crossingest little town on television."

Steve Marsi of TV Fanatic rated the episode with 4.5/5 saying that the episode "showcased all that we love about TVD: Deception, betrayal, shocking twists, things you didn't even know were possible."

Diana Steenbergen from IGN rated the episode with 8/10 saying that the show "returned with an episode packed with enough double and triple crosses that it was almost hard to keep track of them all."
