= Forgive Us All =

New Zealand horror film by Jordana Stott

- Theatrical release poster
- Directed by: Jordana Stott
- Written by: Jordana Stott
- Produced by: Lance Giles; Jared Connon
- Starring: Lily Sullivan; Callan Mulvey; Richard Roxburgh; Dean O'Gorman; Bree Peters; Lawrence Makoare; Lance Giles
- Cinematography: Peter McCaffrey
- Edited by: Michael J. Horton
- Music by: Brandon Roberts
- Production companies: Stiles Pictures; Five Films
- Distributed by: Rialto Distribution (New Zealand and Australia); REASON8 (international)
- Release dates: 1 May 2025 (Australia); 8 May 2025 (New Zealand)
- Running time: 93 minutes
- Country: New Zealand
- Language: English
- Budget: NZ$10 million

Forgive Us All is a 2025 New Zealand neo-Western, apocalyptic horror film directed and written by Jordana Stott. It was independently financed and produced by Lance Giles and Jared Connon. It stars Lily Sullivan, Callan Mulvey and Richard Roxburgh. The movie stars Sullivan as bereaved mother Rory attempting to survive zombies in a post-apocalyptic New Zealand. Forgive Us All was released by Rialto Distribution in New Zealand and Australia on 8 May 2025. British company REASON8 acquired the film's international distribution rights in mid-February 2025.

== Plot summary ==
In a post-apocalyptic New Zealand, a zombie epidemic has led the Government to confine the surviving population into various camps. Zombies known as Howlers roam the countryside, hunting for humans. Rory buries her daughter Matty, who was killed by her infected husband. Rory also killed her infected daughter. She lives in a rural compound with her father in law Otto and struggles with grief and suicidal thoughts

Meanwhile, two men named Noah and Lockie are pursued by government agents led by Logan. These men have escaped from a government camp with a cure for treating Howlers. The government leader Logan kills Lockie but a wounded Noah escapes and seeks refuge with Rory and Otto. Otto reluctantly allows Rory to treat Noah's injuries on the condition that he leaves the following day. Rory examines Noah's pack and discovers the serum.

During the night, Noah gains Rory's trust after helping her to fend off a marauding Howler outside the farm shed. The following day, Noah tells Rory and Otto that he intends to bring the serum to his aunt. Before Noah can leave, Logan and his fellow government agents Brooks and Scout invade the compound. Otto confronts the intruders and makes a last stand against the government agents. Though Brooks is killed during the gunfight, Otto is killed by Logan.

Rory and Noah take advantage of the gunfight to ride away. Disillusioned with Logan's cruelty, Scout deserts him. Logan continues the pursuit and has a showdown with Noah. Though Noah is mortally wounded during a gunfight, Logan is killed and devoured by several Howlers. Noah is attacked and eaten by a Howler soon after. After being bitten herself, Rory finds the Howlers are no longer interested in her and she takes refuge in a cave at night. The following day, she delivers the serum to Noah's aunt before riding away to prepare for her suicide, in the hope of rejoining her daughter Matty.

== Cast ==
- Lily Sullivan as Rory
- Callan Mulvey as Logan
- Richard Roxburgh as Otto
- Dean O'Gorman as Lockie
- Bree Peters as Scout
- Lawrence Makoare as Brooks
- Lance Giles as Noah
- Willow Giles as Matty

== Production ==
=== Development and financing ===
Forgive Us All was written and directed by Jordana Stott, marking her directorial debut. Her husband Lance Giles served as co-producer alongside Jared Connon, who also served as production manager. Stott is an Australian who studied film at Bond University. After meeting Giles, the couple decided to produce a feature film. To generate funding Stott and Giles established a ready-made meal company called Youfoodz in Brisbane in 2012. By the time they sold the company to HelloFresh in 2021, Youfoodz was worth A$125 million. During that period, Stott honed her film-making skills by producing over 30 television advertisements. The couple invested NZ$10 million of their own money into producing Forgive Us All. The film production did not receive any funding from banks, studios or other investors.

=== Writing ===
According to Giles, Stott's script was inspired by the couple's frequent outdoor holiday excursions in the Queenstown area in Central Otago. After selling their food company, the couple moved to the Queenstown area, acquiring a lifestyle block in Gibbston. Giles described the film as a blend of several genres including neo-Western, action and drama.

During an interview with Screen Hub, Giles described Forgive Us All as a "western/horror that challenges moral complexities of survival and has a strong female redemption narrative at its core". She said that the film would explore themes such as motherhood, redemption and hope. The 2023 Hollywood labor disputes allowed the producers more time to work on their script and accumulate resources.

=== Casting ===
The cast members included Lily Sullivan, Callan Mulvey, Richard Roxburgh, Dean O'Gorman, Bree Peters, Lawrence Makoare, Lance Giles. While Stott and Giles had intended to start shooting Forgive Us All in the spring of 2023, casting was delayed by the 2023 Hollywood labor strikes.

Sullivan was cast as Rory, a grieving mother surviving zombies in a post-apocalyptic New Zealand. She said that she was drawn to the project by Stott's vision of the film as a fusion of the Western and thriller genres. Sullivan said that she found Rory's "darkness and lack of light was heavy to entertain constantly".

Roxburgh was cast as Rory's father in law Otto. Roxburgh envisioned his character as a British military veteran who had spent 30 years in New Zealand. He drew upon his munition and rabbit butchery skills for portraying Otto. Roxburgh also served as an executive producer for the film.

=== Design ===
The zombie-like Howlers that appear in the movie were designed by Wētā FX creative art director Gino Acevedo and his colleagues Sarah Rubano and Jason Docherty.

=== Filming ===
Filming for Forgive Us All took place over a 27-day period in the autumn of 2024. Filming locations including Queenstown Hill, Rees Valley Station, Ben Nevis Station and, Kingston. According to Giles and Sullivan, the filming involved significant horse riding, stunt work, fight scenes and several long night shoots. Giles chose to film in the Queenstown area as a homage to his native South Island, stating that he wanted the South Island's landscape to feature in the film.

The production recruited over 100 crew, with over 50% of the film crew being locally recruited. According to Giles, the production crew worked with local businesses, landowners, farmers and the Queenstown Lakes District Council to secure support for the filming.

Jared Connon, who had previously served as a location manager on Peter Jackson's Lord of the Rings trilogy, The Lovely Bones, King Kong and The Hobbit trilogy, also served as production manager and producer for Forgive Us All. Connon had decided to work on the film after learning that Stott and Giles had developed a script and budget for the film.

Forgive Us All also received a 40 percent screen production rebate from the New Zealand Film Commission. Peter McCaffrey served as the film's cinematographer.

=== Post-production ===
Composer Brandon Roberts produced the film's score and sound track. Michael J. Horton served as the film's editor.

Peter Jackson's Park Road Post post-production facility also provided post-production services for Forgive Us All.

== Release ==
To promote the film, Giles and Stott pitched Forgive Us All to film festivals. On 1 December 2024, Giles said that they were aiming for a mid-2025 theatrical release followed by deals with streaming services.

Forgive Us All was released by Rialto Distribution in Australia on 1 May 2025. Rialto released the film in New Zealand on 8 May 2025. British company Reason8 Films acquired the film's international distribution rights in mid-February 2025.

The New Zealand Classification Office gave the film an R16 rating, citing violence, offensive language and disturbing content.

== Reception ==
Samuel Hames of Spicy Pulp website gave Forgive Us All a favourable review, describing the film as a "bold new direction for local filmmaking, shifting gears from lush fantasy and feel-good drama to full-throttle, post-apocalyptic horror". Hames praised director Jordana Stott for contributing a "distinctively meditative, female-driven voice to the zombie genre" and complimented her focus on grief, trauma and survival. Humes also praised the performances of Lily Sullivan, whom he described as the "emotional anchor" of the film. He also complimented the performances of supporting cast members including Richard Roxburgh and Callan Mulvey.

Graeme Tuckett of Stuff and The Post gave the film a mixed review, awarding it three and a half stars out of five. He described the script as a mixture of the Western, post-apocalyptic and zombie horror genres. Tuckett praised Peter McCaffrey's cinematography, Brandon Robert's musical score and the performances of Sullivan and Roxburgh.
