= Eli Kent =

New Zealand playwright and actor

Eli Kent (born 1988) is a New Zealand playwright and actor. Kent holds a master's in scriptwriting from Victoria University of Wellington's International Institute of Modern Letters. Kent co-wrote, with James Ashcroft, the films Coming Home in the Dark and The Rule of Jenny Pen.

Kent went to school in Wellington.

Kent wrote his first play when he was 19, called Rubber Turkey it caused kent recognition at the Chapman Tripp Theatre Awards with outstanding new playwright of the year. The following year his play The Intricate Art of Actually Caring debuted in the 2009 New Zealand Fringe Festival to critical success. This site-specific play was staged in his bedroom and won most original production the Chapman Tripp Theatre Awards and also a Bruce Mason Playwriting Award.

Kent then made his Auckland Theatre Company debut with his play Black Confetti. The New Zealand Listener called him "the voice of a generation".

Kent and Michelle Savill wrote the film Millies Lies are Low (2021). Savill directed the film. Kent and James Ashcroft wrote the feature films, Coming Home in the Dark (2021) and The Rule of Jenny Pen, both directed by Ashcroft. The Rule of Jenny Penn was released in New Zealand in 2025. The film starred actors John Lithgow and Geoffrey Rush.

== Awards ==
- 2015 – Auckland Theatre Company Patrons Fellowship
- 2011 – Arts Foundation of New Zealand New Generation Award
- 2010 – Bruce Mason Playwriting Award
- 2008 – Peter Harcourt Award for Outstanding New Playwright
- 2008 – Chapman Tripp Theatre Awards
- 2025 – New Zealand Film Awards

== Plays ==
- Rubber Turkey
- The Intricate Art of Actually Caring
- Thinning
- Black Confetti
- All Your Wants and Needs Fulfilled Forever
