= Mike Minogue =

Mike Minogue may refer to:

- Mike Minogue (politician) (1923–2008), New Zealand politician
- Mike Minogue (actor), New Zealand actor
- Mike Minogue (businessman), American businessman and candidate for Massachusetts governor
