= Miriama McDowell =

New Zealand actress, director and playwright

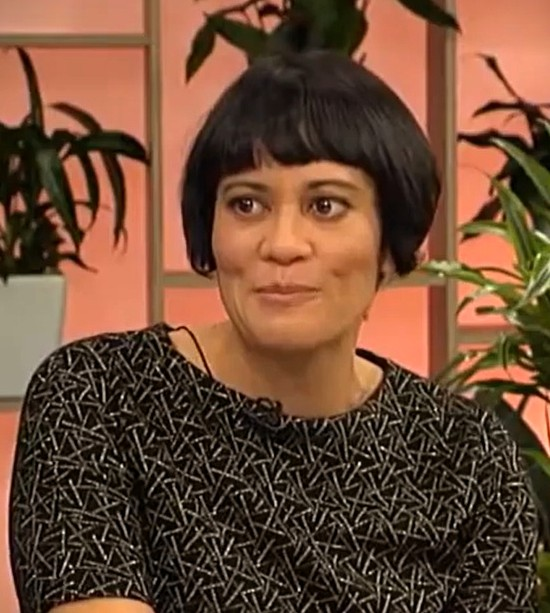
McDowell in 2017

Miriama McDowell is a New Zealand actor, director and playwright. She is a graduate of Toi Whakaari.

McDowell has a long association with Massive Theatre Company in Auckland, and has both acted and directed for the Pop-up Globe, including directing a Pasifika-inspired Much Ado About Nothing which was revived for the Pop-Up Globe's final season, and an all-female version of Emilia. She co-wrote Cellfish and has appeared in numerous stage plays, including Romeo and Juliet and Astroman. Television appearances include Shortland Street, Outrageous Fortune, The Brokenwood Mysteries, anthology series Taonga, Interrogation, Hope and Wire, Head High, and Find Me a Māori Bride. McDowell's film roles include No. 2, The Dark Horse, This is Not My Life, The Great Maiden's Blush, and horror film Coming Home in the Dark. She wrote Te Whare Kapua: The Cloud House for Massive Theatre Company's thirtieth anniversary.

== Personal life and education ==
McDowell affiliates to Ngāti Hine and Ngāpuhi. She was educated at Auckland Girls' Grammar School, and graduated from Toi Whakaari: New Zealand Drama School in 2002 with a Bachelor of Performing Arts (Acting). Her twin brother, Tiopira, is also known as Māori bass producer Mokotron. She lives in Auckland with her two children. McDowell studied under Philippe Gaulier at École Philippe Gaulier in France.

== Work ==
=== Theatre ===
McDowell's directorial debut was with Taki Rua Theatre, with a production of Briar Grace-Smith's Nga Pou Wahine, which played in Auckland, Whangarei and Kaitaia in 2015. McDowell has a long association with Massive Theatre Company in Auckland, describing it as "like a whanau". McDowell directed The Island for Massive, and toured it to the Exchange Festival in Scotland in 2016. Her play Te Whare Kapua: The Cloud House was written for Massive Theatre Company's 30th anniversary. It ran from 16 to 20 February 2021 at Mangere Arts Centre, directed by Sam Scott, as part of the Auckland Fringe Festival.

McDowell co-wrote Cellfish with Jason Te Kare and Rob Mokaraka. Cellfish, about a woman teaching Shakespeare in a men's correctional facility, opened the Auckland Arts Festival in 2017, and was nominated for a 2017 Adam New Zealand Play Award. McDowell also had a strong association with the Pop-Up Globe. She had performed there in 2016 in Romeo and Juliet while gathering material for Cellfish. Then, despite having little directing experience, she was invited to direct Much Ado About Nothing in 2017. The Pasifika-infused production featured Semu Filipo and Jacque Drew as Benedick and Beatrice and was set on a banana plantation with Dogberry and Verges functioning as customs officers in charge of ensuring no illegal or dangerous produce entered the island. The production was revived for the final season of the Globe in 2019, with Renee Lyons and Rutene Spooner as Beatrice and Benedick. Theo David played Claudio in both productions.

McDowell directed an all-woman production of Emilia by Morgan Lloyd Malcolm at the Pop-up Globe in Auckland in March 2020. The play was the last before the Pop-Up Globe was dismantled, and one reviewer said "The heart-warming and skin-tingling karanga that brings the full company (14 actors and 2 musicians) to the stage attests to the playwright’s desire for each production to bring its own kaupapa to the staging and McDowell’s capacity to bring it home." The play would have toured but restrictions on gatherings over 100 people due to the outbreak of Covid-19 in New Zealand in March 2020 caused the cancellation of remaining performances.

McDowell co-starred with Bree Peters in Sam Brooks' political thriller Burn Her, which played to sold-out audiences at Q Theatre in August 2018.

In 2019, McDowell starred in Albert Belz's Astroman, an Auckland Theatre Company and Te Rēhia Theatre Company production at Q Theatre, as part of the Auckland Arts Festival.

In 2021 McDowell directed Alex Lodge's play Sing to Me for Taki Rua. Sing to Me opened at Te Whaea Theatre in Wellington in February, and toured Auckland, Palmerston North, Christchurch and Dunedin.

=== Film and television ===
McDowell has had appearances in a number of TV series, including Shortland Street, Outrageous Fortune, The Brokenwood Mysteries, anthology series Taonga, and Interrogation. She was nominated for an award for her role in Hope and Wire as a Christchurch woman refusing to stay in the city after the 2011 earthquake. McDowell played matriarch Renee O'Kane in TV3's family drama Head High, and was in two seasons of the Māori TV comedy Find Me a Māori Bride. She directed a segment of the collaborative 2017 film Waru.

Film roles include a part as a sister in Toa Fraser's film No. 2, and The Dark Horse, and co-starring roles in 2010 mystery thriller This is Not My Life and 2015's The Great Maiden's Blush.

McDowell starred in the 2021 horror film Coming Home in the Dark, which premiered at the Sundance Film Festival, and Whina (2022), a biographical film where McDowell portrays a younger Dame Whina Cooper.

== Awards and honours ==
At the 2015 Wellington Theatre Awards, McDowell won The George Webby Most Promising New Director award for her production of Nga Pou Wahine.

McDowell won the Best Actress Award at the New Zealand Film Awards for her role in The Great Maiden's Blush.

McDowell received a New Zealand Television Award for Best Actress in 2020 for her role in Head High.
