= The Rule of Jenny Pen =

2024 film by James Ashcroft

- US release poster
- Directed by: James Ashcroft
- Written by: Eli Kent; James Ashcroft
- Based on: "The Rule of Jenny Pen" by Owen Marshall
- Produced by: Catherine Fitzgerald; Orlando Stewart
- Starring: John Lithgow; Geoffrey Rush; George Henare
- Cinematography: Matt Henley
- Edited by: Gretchen Peterson
- Music by: John Gibson
- Production companies: Light in the Dark Productions; Blueskin Films
- Distributed by: Galaxy Pictures
- Release dates: 19 September 2024 (Fantastic Fest); 20 March 2025 (New Zealand)
- Running time: 104 minutes
- Country: New Zealand
- Language: English
- Box office: US$647,692

The Rule of Jenny Pen is a 2024 New Zealand psychological horror film based on Owen Marshall's short story of the same name. Directed by James Ashcroft and written by Ashcroft and Eli Kent, it stars John Lithgow, Geoffrey Rush, and George Henare.

The film is set in a care home for the elderly, where one resident severely harms the others under his tyrannical rule, unbeknownst to staff. The film premiered at Fantastic Fest on 19 September 2024, and was released in New Zealand on 20 March 2025, receiving positive reviews.

== Plot ==
An elderly judge, Stefan Mortensen, suffers a stroke while passing sentence in court. Partially immobile, but determined to fully regain his faculties, he takes up what he hopes will be temporary residence in a care home. To his displeasure, Stefan finds himself sharing a bedroom with former rugby player Tony Garfield. His first day, he witnesses another resident, Howie, accidentally set himself on fire while drinking and smoking.

Cantankerous and somewhat snobby, Stefan largely keeps to himself. He soon catches the attention of long-term resident Dave Crealy, who masquerades as confused by day but bullies and terrorises the residents by night. Crealy begins regularly visiting Stefan and Tony in the night to torment them, throwing a bottle of urine over Stefan and forcing Tony to grovel to a hand puppet he calls Jenny Pen. Tony initially refuses to defy Dave, afraid of being remembered as nothing but a victim when he dies. Stefan dismisses him as a coward, and attempts to complain to the staff, but is rebuffed when they inform him Crealy has accused him of theft. Their suspicion increases when they discover a pair of knickers and a set of teeth Crealy has planted in Stefan's room.

As his condition worsens, Stefan gradually realises he may be unable to return home. He tries to drown himself in the bath, but panics and grasps at the rails, and is saved by a care assistant. Stefan sees in old staff photos hanging in a hallway that Crealy has been at the care home for decades, working as a janitor before becoming a resident. Because of this, he has keys to every room and a key card allowing outside access. One night Crealy leads Joyce, an elderly woman with dementia, out of a secure gate. She wanders into the night, looking for her family, and is found dead the next morning.

Despite his increasingly worsening physical faculties, Stefan tries to stand up against the constant bullying. He attempts to get rid of Crealy by emptying his asthma inhalers. After suffering an asthma attack, Crealy is rescued by the staff, and later retaliates by trying to sexually abuse a female resident in front of her blind husband, but Stefan rises from his wheelchair and strikes Crealy with his cane. Crealy later visits Stefan in the night, admitting he finds the judge impressive and explaining that he spent his whole adult life feeling bored and worthless, but now relishes the chance to torment and bully at will.

Seeing Stefan's example, Tony finally stands up to Crealy, challenging him with a haka in the dining room. Knowing Crealy will try and punish any act of defiance, Stefan and Tony lure him to an isolated laundry room where they attack and smother him to death. In the following days, Tony can finally sleep in peace and Stefan, who begins forming friendships with the other residents, disposes of Jenny Pen on an outdoor fire pit, watching the puppet slowly burn. The care home's pet cat, labeled by the residents as an omen of imminent death, approaches Stefan, who smiles and resumes a game with the other residents.

== Cast ==
- John Lithgow as Dave Crealy
- Geoffrey Rush as Stefan Mortensen
- George Henare as Tony Garfield
- Ian Mune as Howie Wicker
- Thomas Sainbury as Carer Mike
- Maaka Pohatu as Dr Neels
- Holly Shanahan as Madeline Shepard
- Paolo Rotondo as a psychologist
- Ginette McDonald as Sally Pile
- Hilary Norris as Eunice Joyce
- Anapela Polataivao as Carer Jasmine
- Nathaniel Lees as Sonny Ausage

== Production ==
In 2023, it was announced that Geoffrey Rush and John Lithgow would star in the psychological thriller. It is an adaptation of Owen Marshall's short story, who appeared as an extra in the film.

The Rule of Jenny Pen was filmed in Taupō, Wellington and Lower Hutt, New Zealand, in 2023. Wairakei Resort near Taupō was used for the rest home setting.

== Release ==
The film was shown at Fantastic Fest on 19 September 2024, and at Sitges Film Festival in October 2024. In September 2024, the film was acquired by IFC Films / Shudder for distribution in North America, the United Kingdom and Ireland. It was released on 20 March 2025 in New Zealand and Australia by Galaxy Pictures, a distribution label created by Australia's Rialto and the UK's Vertigo Releasing. The film was released on 7 March in the United States, and a week later in the UK on 14 March. The film was released on Shudder and AMC+ on 28 March 2025.

== Reception ==
On the review aggregator website Rotten Tomatoes, 71% of 102 critics' reviews are positive, with the website's consensus saying: "John Lithgow's frighteningly unhinged performance reigns over The Rule of Jenny Pen, a nasty chiller that's by turns monotonous and haunting." Metacritic, which uses a weighted average, assigned the film a score of 66 out of 100, based on 20 critics, indicating "generally favorable" reviews.

Reviewer Alex Billington from FirstShowing described the film as "an instant horror classic". Horror novelist Stephen King described it as "one of the best movies I’ve seen this year." The Guardian called it a "bracingly malicious tale of elder abuse".

== Awards ==
Ashcroft won best director at the Fantastic Fest in Austin in September 2024. Lithgow and Rush shared the best actor award at Spain’s Sitges Film Festival in October 2024.
