= Coming Home in the Dark =

2021 thriller film

- Film poster
- Directed by: James Ashcroft
- Written by: Eli Kent; James Ashcroft
- Based on: "Coming Home in the Dark" by Owen Marshall
- Produced by: Mike Minogue; Catherine Fitzgerald; Desray Armstrong
- Starring: Daniel Gillies; Erik Thomson; Miriama McDowell; Matthias Luafutu
- Cinematography: Matt Henley
- Edited by: Annie Collins
- Production companies: Light in the Dark Productions; MPI Media Group
- Release date: 31 January 2021 (Sundance)
- Running time: 93 minutes
- Country: New Zealand
- Language: English
- Budget: $970,000

Coming Home in the Dark is a 2021 New Zealand psychological thriller film based on the 1995 short story by Owen Marshall. Directed by James Ashcroft and written by Ashcroft and Eli Kent, the film stars Daniel Gillies, Erik Thomson, Miriama McDowell and Matthias Luafutu. The film premiered at the 2021 Sundance Film Festival on 31 January 2021.

== Plot ==
Jill and Alan 'Hoaggie' Hoaganraad are on a road trip with their two teenage sons, Maika and Jordan. While hiking, Maika notices two men in the distance watching them before disappearing. While the family picnics by the road, they are interrupted by the two violent drifters, Mandrake and Tubs. The pair robs them at gunpoint and forces them to lie down, but before they leave, Mandrake overhears Maika call Alan 'Hoaggie'. Mandrake suddenly murders Maika and Jordan and abducts the parents after night falls, knocking Jill unconscious and breaking Alan's arm.

As Mandrake questions the pair, he reveals that he knows Alan is a teacher and was once an assistant teacher at a group home for troubled boys, one notorious for physical and sexual abuse. Alan guesses correctly that both were enrolled at the school, but he insists that he was completely unaware of the abuse; Mandrake does not believe him and implies that they are driving to the boy's home. When they stop at a gas station, Alan attempts to secretly alert the station attendant; however, Mandrake suspects this and kills the attendant by bludgeoning him with a fire extinguisher. Alan pretends to accidentally hit himself with the door while entering the car but as he kneels next to the car to "recover", he presses a screw into the back left tire.

Jill attempts to escape, but is quickly caught and later forced to kneel underneath an overpass. Threatening to shoot her, Mandrake forces Alan to admit that he was aware of all of the abuse, but stopped and reported nothing out of cowardice. Alan relays a story of a young boy who tattooed a swastika on his arm; at roll call, an admin of Jewish background painfully and forcibly scrubbed it from his skin with a nylon brush, which traumatized the rest of the students. Jill is shaken by this admission, and later rebuffs Alan's attempts at contact. When it's clear that Mandrake will not let her go, she escapes from the moving vehicle and then chooses to jump into the nearby river rather than return to her abductors; her fate is left ambiguous.

Alan briefly escapes when they stop to replace the tire Alan pressed a nail into, and reaches a car with a group of teenagers. However, Mandrake finds them and convinces them to force Alan out of the car, before murdering all but one, who manages to escape when Mandrake runs out of ammo. With Alan recaptured, they finally reach an old boarding school, presumably where Mandrake and/or Tubs grew up.

Walking through the now-abandoned building, Alan admits that he was not just a coward, but also privately believed that the boy with the tattoo deserved his punishment. Believing Mandrake to be that boy, he apologizes for not stepping in. Mandrake reveals that the boy wasn't him. He then shoots Alan in the chest and taunts him, but Alan hits him with a rock and bludgeons him. Mandrake survives, though wounded and disoriented, and tries but fails to kill Alan. Tubs, who Alan had talked to a few times, implying that he only does what Mandrake tells him to, likening that behaviour to still being in a boarding school, arrives and kills Mandrake with the rifle. He leaves the heavily wounded Alan, telling him "I hate this place", which is also carved into a stone behind Alan. Flashbacks reveal that the carving was made by a traumatised boy growing up at that boarding school; whether or not that boy had actually been the tortured one is not explicitly shown. Tubs goes to an undisclosed location and looks out at the rising sun, silently crying.

== Cast ==
The cast includes:

- Daniel Gillies as Mandrake
- Erik Thomson as Hoaggie
- Miriama McDowell as Jill
- Matthias Luafutu as Tubs

== Release ==
Coming Home in the Dark premiered at the 2021 Sundance Film Festival on 31 January 2021 in the Midnight section.

== Reception ==
Review aggregator Rotten Tomatoes gave the film a 92% approval rating from 62 reviews and an average rating of 7.0/10. The critical consensus reads: "Smart, well-acted, and above all scary, Coming Home in the Dark finds first-time director James Ashcroft making his mark with a white-knuckle ride for horror fans." Metacritic, which uses a weighted average, assigned the film a score of 64 out of 100, based on 4 critics, indicating "generally favorable" reviews.
