= Daddy Issues (The Vampire Diaries) =

- The Vampire Diaries episode
- Episode no.: Season 2 Episode 13
- Directed by: Joshua Butler
- Written by: Kevin Williamson; Julie Plec
- Cinematography by: Paul M. Sommers
- Editing by: Joshua Butler
- Production code: 2J5263
- Original air date: February 3, 2011

Guest appearances
- David Anders as John Gilbert; Michaela McManus as Jules; Randy J. Goodwin as Jonas Martin; Stephen Amell as Brady; Dawn Olivieri as Andie Star

Episode chronology
← Previous "The Descent"	Next → "Crying Wolf"
- The Vampire Diaries season 2

"Daddy Issues" is the thirteenth episode of the second season of the American supernatural teen drama television series The Vampire Diaries, and the 35th of the series. It aired on The CW on February 3, 2011. The episode was written by series developers Kevin Williamson and Julie Plec, and directed by Joshua Butler.

== Plot ==
Tyler (Michael Trevino) finds Caroline (Candice Accola) after what Jules (Michaela McManus) told him and asks her if she knew about Mason. Caroline admits that she did and Tyler loses his temper for a while and throws her against the car. He leaves upset and Caroline gets to Stefan (Paul Wesley) right away to inform him that Tyler knows about Mason and that he and Damon are also vampires and the ones who killed Mason. She asks him to talk to Tyler so he won't go to Damon (Ian Somerhalder) because if Damon finds out he will kill him.

At the Gilbert house, Jenna (Sara Canning) is surprised when she sees John (David Anders) in the house and wants to know why he is back in town. John informs her that he is Elena's (Nina Dobrev) biological father and leaves. Meanwhile, Damon gets upset with Stefan for bringing John back to town to help them since he cannot trust him but Stefan believes that after Elena's deal with Elijah, they do not have many options since they cannot kill an Original and John knows how to do it.

Tyler is confused with the whole situation about Mason and Jules tries to convince him that he belongs with the rest of the pack and that vampires are their enemies. She wants him to leave town so she can teach him how to survive but Tyler does not want to leave his mother. Jules leaves and goes to a trailer in the woods where he finds Brady (Stephen Amell), another werewolf, while Stefan gets into Tyler's house to talk to him. Tyler is scared and tries to get away but Stefan tells him that he will not hurt him and that he just wants to talk to him.

Jonas (Randy J. Goodwin) tries to talk to Bonnie (Kat Graham) but Bonnie is mad because she trusted Luka but Luka betrayed her. She also informs him that she knows he is working with Elijah and Jonas reassures her that Elijah wants to protect Elena and that he will personally make sure that Elena and her friends will not get hurt.

Back at Tyler's house, Stefan tries to make Tyler understand that Caroline lied to him to protect his life and that they are all friends but after everything Jules told him, Tyler has hard time to which one to trust. In the meantime, Caroline runs into Matt (Zach Roerig) who wants to talk to her about their relationship. They arrange to meet later but when Caroline walks towards her car, Jules ambushes her and along with Brady, they kidnap her and lock her up in a cage at Brady's trailer where Brady tortures her.

Jules calls Stefan from Caroline's phone and tells him that she wants Tyler otherwise she will kill Caroline. Stefan calls Elena who tells Damon about it and Damon gets mad at her for not telling him sooner. He leaves to solve the problem and leaves Elena behind with John keeping an eye on her so she will not follow him.

Stefan arrives at Brady's trailer with Tyler and demands to see Caroline so they can make the trade. Jules does not intend to leave Caroline unless she gets Tyler. Damon appears who is not really willing to be as kind as Stefan is and asks for Caroline. He threatens Jules but when he does, about eight werewolves come out of the woods with sticks and blowtorches in their hands. Stefan lets Tyler go and he and Damon start fighting the werewolves.

Tyler gets into the trailer and finds Caroline locked up in the cage. She asks him to help her but he hesitates before he let her free. Caroline gets out of the trailer and is ready to help Damon and Stefan but Jules gets to her and pulls a gun on her. Tyler watches without doing anything and just right before the werewolves kill Damon, Stefan and Caroline, all the werewolves except from Tyler collapse. Jonas comes out of the woods and informs everyone that Elijah promised to keep them safe and that's what he is doing. Damon, Stefan and Caroline leave and Jonas tells Tyler to let his friends know that they should leave the town when they wake up.

Stefan escorts Caroline back home but he is worried about her after what she has been through. She says she is fine and Stefan leaves but he knows that she needs some friends so he asks Elena and Bonnie to come and stay with her. Before Elena and Bonnie arrive, Caroline receives a phone call from Matt who is waiting for her, something that Caroline had totally forgotten with everything that happened. She finds an excuse for not appearing by telling him that something happened to Bonnie and she had to be with her. Matt sees Bonnie sitting with Jeremy (Steven R. McQueen) at the Grill and knows that Caroline lies to him but he does not say anything. Tyler visits her as well to tell her how bad he feels about what happened and that he did not know Jules was going to come after her but Caroline is mad at him because he did not do anything to stop them when Jules and the other werewolves were about to kill them. She slams the door in his face and Tyler leaves confused.

Damon meets with John who decided to trust Damon and he tells him how he can kill an Original. He gives him a dagger and a vial that contains ash, telling him that the ash comes from a white oak tree from the Original's genesis and it is the only tree that can kill the Originals. John explains Damon how to use it.

Tyler goes back to Jules and Brady because he has nowhere else to go and at the moment they are his only friends. Jules and Brady wonder why Mason would stay at Mystic Falls risking his life and Tyler mentions the moonstone Mason was looking for, something that makes both, Jules and Brady look very interested in.

The episode ends with John paying a visit to Katherine at the tomb. Katherine tells him that she sent a message to Isobel with Stefan and John reassures her that Isobel got her message. Katherine also says that she wants to get out of the tomb and John tells her that he is already on it.

== Feature music ==
In "Daddy Issues" we can hear the songs:

- "Losing Your Memory" by Ryan Star
- "Strip Me" by Natasha Bedingfield
- "Stay" by Hurts
- "Don't You Remember" by Adele
- "Only One" by Alex Band

== Reception ==
=== Ratings ===
In its original American broadcast, "Daddy Issues" was watched by 3.22 million; down by 0.31 from the previous episode.

=== Reviews ===
"Daddy Issues" received positive reviews.

Matt Richenthal of TV Fanatic rated the episode with 4.8/5 saying that the episode was an exciting, action-packed one. "Overall, a tight, solid, focused hour of television that continued to raise the stakes."

Diana Steenbergen from IGN rated the episode with 8.5/10 saying that it was another jam-packed episode and that "The comparisons and contrasts between the vampires and werewolves in this episode were intriguing." Steenbergen also comments on Damon's moral crisis and how the writers keep the character to the edge. "The delicate balancing act with Damon's character continues — on the one hand, the charisma Ian Somerhalder brings to Damon's reckless side is one of the best parts of the show, yet on the other hand, there is a limit to how many innocent people someone can kill while remaining convincingly on the good guys' side. Damon's current moral crisis has been emotional and affecting to watch, and it is a bold move for the show to continue to keep him so close to the edge."

E. Reagan from The TV Chick gave an A− rating to the episode saying that it was another great one with solid stuff in it. "Another great episode. Loved all of the Caroline stuff, and Damon’s creepy serial killer like thing at the end. [...] Solid stuff. Although, the wolf stuff is annoying me. Not the storyline, just the characters."

Carrie Raisler from The A.V. Club gave a B− rating to the episode focusing on the loyalty between the characters' relationships of the show: "Thus far in the series, loyalty is one of the strongest foundations for relationships on The Vampire Diaries. When dealing with as many secrets, lies, double crosses, schemes, and general tomfoolery as these characters do, knowing the people you surround yourself with have your back at all costs is essential. [...]In "Daddy Issues," however, the focus is on the negative side of loyalty—to friends, to family members, even to your own kind—with mostly disastrous results for the characters."

Robin Franson Pruter of Forced Viewing gave the episode 2/4 saying that the episode is a storyline mishmash and not up the series' usual level of quality and states that the most interesting developments involve the relationship between Caroline and Tyler. "Without a unifying special event, "Daddy Issues" meanders through various storylines without ever giving a sense that the writers know what the episode is about. [...] The relationship between Caroline and Tyler would be complicated enough without the writers attempting to create unnecessary conflict by reviving the lifeless corpse of the Caroline/Matt romance. This needless attempt to pick up a storyline from the first season to put another obstacle in the way of Caroline and Tyler prevents the show from focusing on the bigger obstacle of vampire-werewolf enmity. This episode does use that obstacle effectively to push Caroline and Tyler apart, but the series fails to exploit the old Romeo & Juliet trope for all its proven narrative worth."
