= Danny Coughlin's Bad Dream =

Novella by Stephen King

- Author: Stephen King
- Language: English
- Genre: Detective fiction; noir fiction; police procedural
- Set in: Kansas, United States
- Publisher: Scribner
- Publication date: May 21, 2024
- Publication place: United States
- Media type: Print (Hardcover)

Danny Coughlin's Bad Dream is a novella by Stephen King, first published in 2024 as part of King's collection You Like It Darker.

== Plot summary ==
Danny Coughlin is a high school custodian in Manitou, Kansas. He has a vivid dream in which he walks behind a derelict Texaco gas station to find a mongrel dog gnawing on a hand projecting from the ground. While at his job at Wilder High School, Coughlin uses clues from his dream to locate the gas station on the Internet. That Saturday, Coughlin drives to Gunnel in the far north of Kansas, where he finds the gas station, dog, and hand, exactly as in his dream. Coughlin covers the hand with a trash can to protect it from the dog, then purchases a prepaid cell phone, which he uses to anonymously report the body to the Kansas Highway Patrol. The body is discovered by police, who identify it as Yvonne Wicker, a young woman who was raped and murdered.

The following Friday, Coughlin is visited by the arithmomaniac veteran inspector Franklin Jalbert and his younger colleague Ella Davis of the Kansas Bureau of Investigation, who have traced his call. Jalbert and Davis disbelieve Coughlin's explanation, suspecting him of the murder. They take a cheek swab from Coughlin to compare his DNA with that found on the corpse (though this is a bluff as there was no DNA found on the corpse), and execute search warrants on his truck and trailer. The search of Coughlin's truck finds no evidence of Wicker's body having been in the truck.

On Saturday, Coughlin attends a police interview, accompanied by his lawyer, Edgar Ball. During the interview, Davis unsuccessfully bluffs that Wicker's fingerprints were found in Coughlin's truck. Coughlin surrenders his phone to the police to enable them to track his movements over the prior weeks; Ball realizes that the police do not know exactly when Wicker was killed. After Jalbert and Davis again urge Coughlin to admit his guilt, he urges them to find the real killer. Jalbert remains convinced that Coughlin is the murderer, while Davis begins to harbor doubts.

On Tuesday, Coughlin is named as the murder suspect in the Plains Truth, a free newspaper. On Wednesday, he is fired from his job at Wilder High School. On Thursday, he is confronted by Jalbert while shopping in an IGA. On Friday, a brick with a threatening note is thrown at Coughlin's trailer. On Sunday, Coughlin's neighbor Bill Dumfries advises him that the other residents of the trailer park want Coughlin to leave; he resolves to move to Colorado near his brother.

As Jalbert grows frustrated, his arithmomania becomes more severe; he visits Coughlin during his final day of work at Wilder High School where he taunts Danny with a newspaper article of Wicker's bereaved family, plants drugs in his truck, then arranges for a Kansas Highway Patrol officer to stop and search Coughlin's vehicle. Coughlin however grows suspicious when he finds out that Jalbert had parked near his vehicle behind the school. Coughlin finds the drugs under the driver's seat of his truck and removes them before they can be found. He then gives the drugs to Davis and urges her to find out who leaked his name to the Plains Truth. Davis interviews Peter Andersson, editor of the Plains Truth, who plays her a recording of the anonymous tip-off he received. The voice is disguised using a vocoder, but Davis recognises Jalbert when he impulsively utters the word "fifteen" during the call. Confronting Jalbert about planting the drugs and tipping-off the newspaper, Davis urges him to step back from the case and retire; Jalbert initially refuses, but eventually announces he will retire.

After more newspapers identify Coughlin as a suspect, he is shot in the abdomen by Wicker's brother Albert. While hospitalized, Coughlin is visited by Davis, who tells him that a serial killer named Andrew Iverson has confessed to the murder. Jalbert, unwilling to accept Coughlin could be innocent, rationalizes that Coughlin and Iverson were accomplices, and resolves to kill Coughlin himself. Jalbert distracts the police by calling in an anonymous bomb threat at the high school and drives to the hospital. Coughlin has a premonitory dream in which Jalbert attacks the hospital, firing shots at the nurses station before shooting Coughlin. He phones Davis, who intercepts Jalbert outside the hospital; the former partners hold one another at gunpoint. After a nurse attempts to restrain Jalbert, he disables her, but then shoots himself. Davis apologizes to Coughlin and asks him if he knows why he had the dreams. Coughlin replies that he does not know, and that "belief is hard".

== Publication ==
King was inspired to write Danny Coughlin's Bad Dream after thinking "what would happen if a man had a single psychic flash [...] that showed him where a body was buried [...] would they think he was the killer?" The character of Jalbert was inspired by, and named after, the fanatical police inspector Javert from the 1862 Victor Hugo novel Les Misérables. Danny Coughlin's Bad Dream was published in May 2024 as part of King's collection You Like It Darker. It is the longest story in the collection.

== Reception ==
Reviewing You Like It Darker for The New York Times, Gabino Iglesias described Danny Coughlin's Bad Dream as "the crown jewel of the collection". Mike Finn described Danny Coughlin's Bad Dream as "a powerful novella. Not a pleasant read but a compelling one [...] grindingly oppressive and totally believable." Similarly, Amanda Mullen (writing for Screen Rant) described the story as a "a frustrating and intense read".

Jenn Adams (writing for Bloody Disgusting) compared Danny Coughlin's Bad Dream to King's 2018 work The Outsider. Adams described the story, as "unfold[ing] like a confounding episode of Law & Order, eschewing supernatural scares for 'ripped from the headlines' horror", adding "King hints at racial and gender-based discrimination, but stops short of fully examining the larger implications of this disturbing premise". SFX described Danny Coughlin's Bad Dream as "a tightly written, fascinating character study that also raises questions about fate. Matthew Jackson (writing for Paste) described Danny Coughlin's Bad Dream as "an ambitious balance between paranoia and wonder" and "an attempt to marry the supernatural with the very real threat of false accusations", noting that "while it doesn't work as well as [The Outsider], the scope of it, and the depths of tension into which King dives, make it memorable". Writing for USA Today, Brandon Truitt noted the story as an example of "King's recent noir detective/procedural era".

Writing for Rolling Stone, Sassan Niasseri suggested "the class of Danny Coughlin's Bad Dream is evident in the superfluity of its paranormal starting point. The question of whether Coughlin can prove his innocence becomes much more interesting than the question of why he even has these dreams that allow him to predict murders. His dreams are a McGuffin. You don't have to explain every miracle, and the final sentence 'There's nothing to say' couldn't be better." Similarly, J. Madison Davis (writing for World Literature Today) suggested "the most interesting element of his story is that the dream which provokes it all is never really understood or explained. We are spared the predictably unconvincing explanation."

== Adaptations ==
SFX suggested that Danny Coughlin's Bad Dream "will (almost inevitably) make a great miniseries", while Amanda Mullen described the story as "the ideal pick for a TV adaptation".

In February 2025, The Post reported that New Zealand director James Ashcroft had been personally selected by King to direct a film adaptation of Danny Coughlin's Bad Dream.

== See also ==
- Stephen King short fiction bibliography
