= Bree Peters =

New Zealand stage, film and television actress, stunt performer and boxer

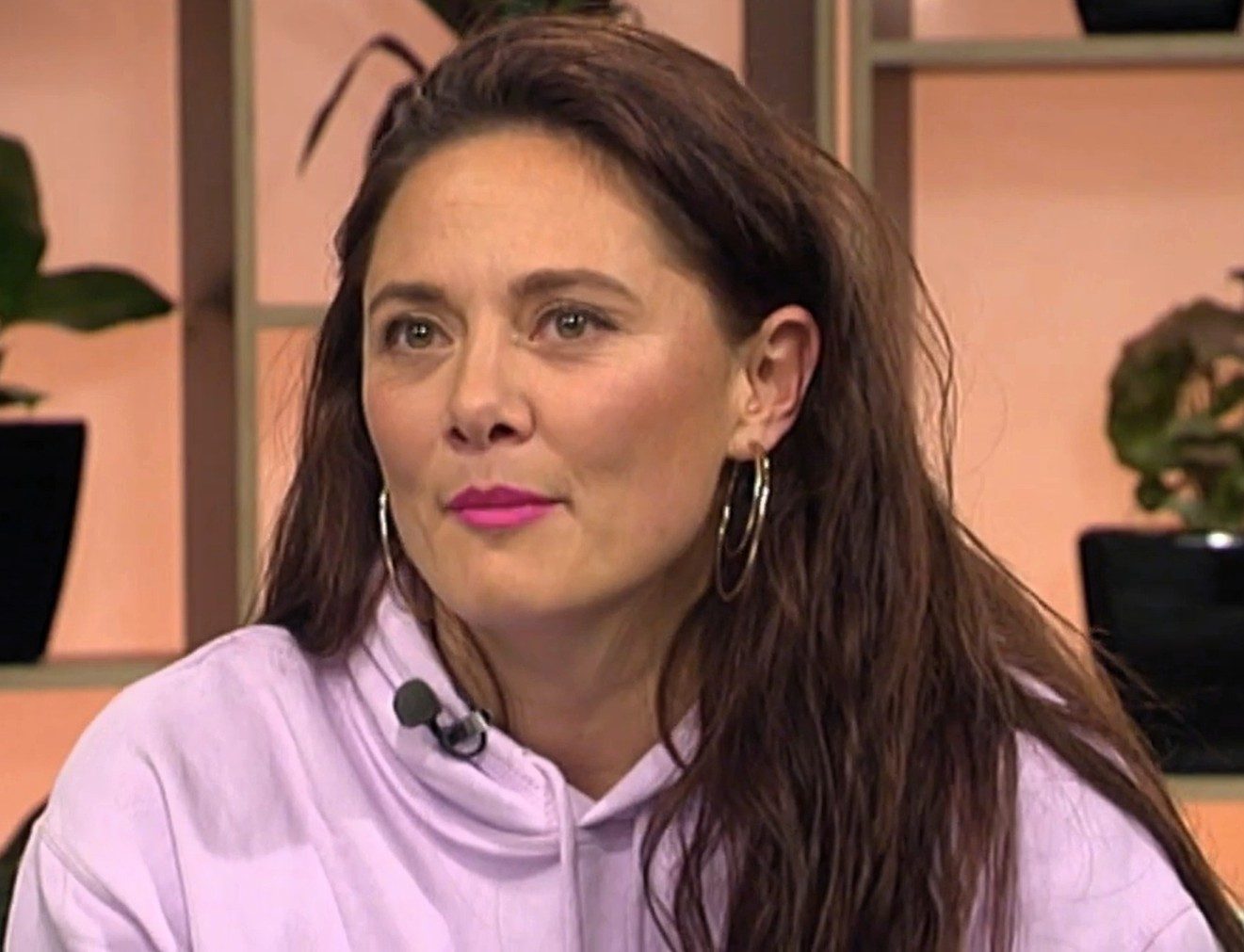
- Peters in 2018
- Born: Brittany Peters; 18 April 1985 (age 41); New Zealand
- Education: Otumoetai College
- Occupations: Actress, stunt performer, Acting Coach
- Years active: 2002–present
- Notable work: Shortland Street; Home and Away
- Parent(s): Winston Peters; Louise Peters
- Relatives: Jim Peters (uncle); Ian Peters (uncle); Lynette Stewart (aunt)
- Awards: Te Tohu Auahatanga Award for Best Actress; Tropfest Viewers' Choice Award for Best Actress
- Website: Bree Peters on Instagram; Bree Peters on Facebook

Brittany Peters (born 18 April 1985) is a New Zealand stage, film and television actress, director, stunt performer and acting coach. She is best known for her recurring roles on the soap operas Shortland Street, as Pania Stevens (2014–2015), and in Home and Away, as Gemma Parata (2020).

== Early life ==
Peters was born in New Zealand to Louise, a primary school teacher and Winston Peters, a politician who served as Deputy Prime Minister from 2023 to 2025. She has one older sibling – a brother, Joel.

== Career ==
Peters' acting career commenced in 2002 when she was cast in the stage production of Fame, based on the film of the same name; after which she entered formal training and attended the Toi Whakaari: NZ Drama School, graduating in 2006 with a Bachelor of Performing Arts degree. Following this, she attended the Actors Lab Workshop where she was trained by actress Miranda Harcourt. She continued in theatre before appearing in short films and then television, landing guest roles on The Almighty Johnsons, Go Girls, The Blue Rose and Nothing Trivial. She later underwent a Professional Practitioners course at the Massive Theatre Company.

In 2014, Peters began appearing in the medical soap opera Shortland Street as Dr. Pania Stevens. Her first major screen role, Peters' duration on the show lasted eight months on a recurring basis. Her role on the series was met with a mixed reception; viewers were highly critical of her portrayal as a villain and she was subjected to online bullying forcing her to close all her social media accounts, while others showed their support as she was praised for her performance and her acting skills.

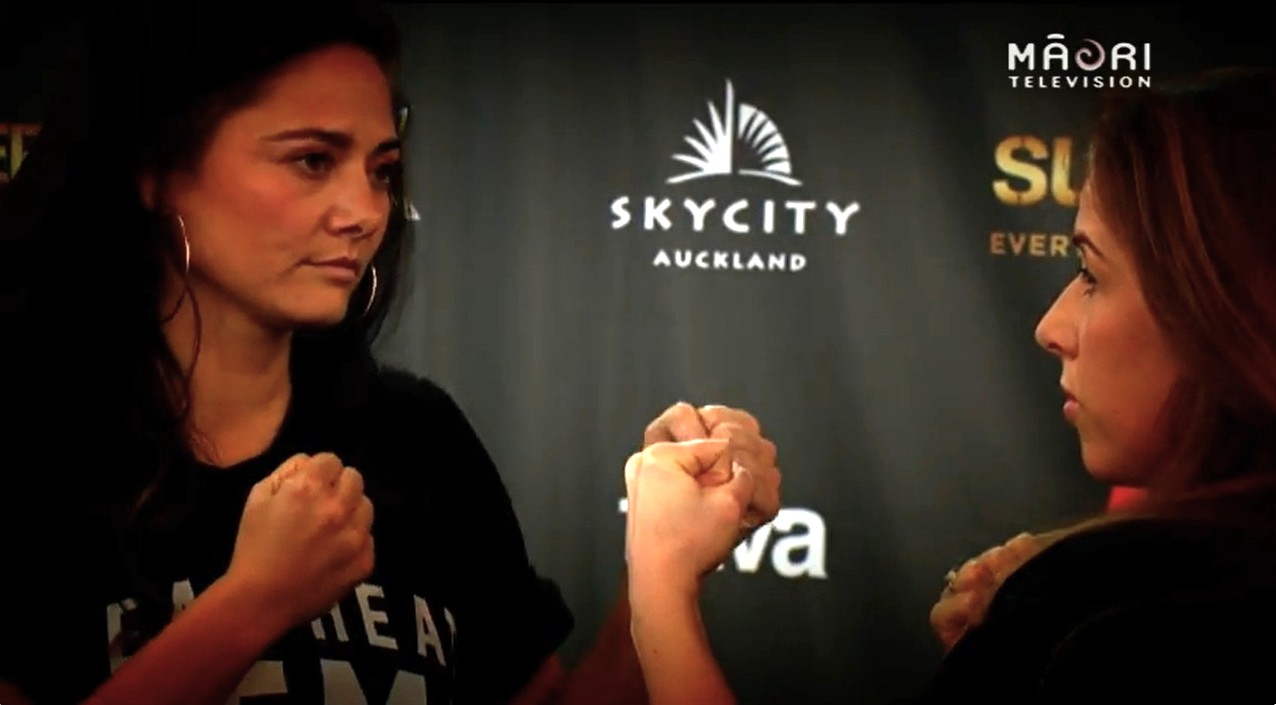
Peters (left) facing Lisa O'Loughlin in 2015

In conjunction with her acting career, she began courses in stunt work for Cherokee Films New Zealand, and professional boxing where she trained at Fight Camp. In 2015, Peters competed in the Female Celebrity Fight category at the Super 8 Boxing Tournament, beating actress Lisa O'Loughlin.

For her performance in short film Every Moment, she earned the Te Tohu Auahatanga Award for Best Actress and the Viewers' Choice Award for Best Actress at the Tropfest New Zealand in 2015, while she was additionally nominated for a New Zealand Film Award for Best Actress in a Short Film.

In 2016, Peters travelled to the United States where she attended a three-month Summer course at the Atlantic Theater Company. Her subsequent television work followed with guest appearances on Find Me a Māori Bride, The Dead Lands and Fresh Eggs.

In 2019, it was announced that Peters would be cast in the Seven Network Australian soap opera Home and Away. She appeared as Gemma Parata, part of a Māori family who moves to Summer Bay under tragic circumstances. She made her first appearance in the ninety-minute opening episode of the 2020 season on 27 January. She departed the series in July 2020.

== Theatre credits ==
- Fame – as Lambchops (2002)
- Antony and Cleopatra – as Cleopatra (2004) – Toi Whakaari: NZ Drama School
- Pegasus Moon – as Dancer (2005) – Toi Whakaari: NZ Drama School
- Stop Kiss – as Callie (2005) – Toi Whakaari: NZ Drama School
- Battles of the Heart – as Neva (2005) – Toi Whakaari: NZ Drama School
- The Seagull – as Polina (2005) – Toi Whakaari: NZ Drama School
- Stuff Happens – as Condoleezza Rice (2005) – Toi Whakaari: NZ Drama School
- Cabaret – as Lead Soloist (2005) – Toi Whakaari: NZ Drama School
- Tape – as Amy (2006) – Toi Whakaari: NZ Drama School
- People Don't Sing When They're Feeling Sensible – as Lead (2006) – Toi Whakaari: NZ Drama School
- Peer Gynt – as Various roles (2006) – Toi Whakaari: NZ Drama School
- The Crucible – as Mercy Lewis (2007) – Auckland Theatre Company
- Whero's New Net – as Whero (2008) – Massive Theatre Company
- Life as a Dream – Various roles (2009) – Silo Theatre
- Whero's New Net (National Tour) – as Whero (2009) – Silo Theatre
- Havoc in the Garden – as Jani (2011) – Massive Theatre Company
- A Basement Christmas Carol – as Bobby Cratchet (2013) – Silo Theatre
- Hauraki Horror – Paikea (2014) – Silo Theatre
- Generation Z: Edinburgh Fringe Festival – as Frosty (2014) – Royale Productions
- Generation Z: Zombie Red Zone – as Frosty (2014) – Royale Productions
- The Wholehearted – as Performer/deviser (2016)
- Burn Her – as Lead (2018) – Massive Theatre Company
- Emilia – as Mary Sidney (2020)

== Filmography ==
Film
Year	Title	Role	Notes
2004	This Topia	Holly Wills	Short film; Toi Whakaari production
2005	A&E: Accident and Eternity	Doctor Bailey	Short film; Toi Whakaari production
2006	Motivation	Sam	Short film
2012	Night Shift	Supervisor	Short film
2012	The Weight of Elephants	Miss Pryor	Feature film
2013	Enemy Within	Kalima Kekoa	Feature film
2014	Every Moment	Annie	Short film
2016	Hillary Clinton/Young Lover	Norma Leota	Short film
2018	Bellbird	Ana	Feature film; "Northland" (working title)
2019	Oranges and Lemons	Teacher	Short film; R&G (working title)
2019	Runaway Millionaires	Aroha Hurring	Television film
2020	Baby Done	Sonographer	Feature film
2025	Forgive Us All	Scout	Feature film
2025	Bring Her Back	Goalball Coach	Feature film
TBA	The Canyon	Grayce	Post-production

Television
Year	Title	Role	Notes
2009	Feedback	Various roles	
2012	The Almighty Johnsons	Shona	Season 2; guest role (1 episode)
2013	The Blue Rose	Kat	Season 1; guest role (1 episode)
2013	Go Girls	Barmaid	Season 5; guest role (1 episode)
2012–13	Nothing Trivial	Karen	Seasons 2–3; guest role (3 episodes)
2014–15, 2023	Shortland Street	Pania Stevens	Seasons 23–24, 32; recurring role
2015	Funny Girls	Various roles	
2016	Tinderellas	Stephanie	Pilot (not picked up) (also wardrobe supervisor)
2016	Find Me a Māori Bride	Susan	Season 2; recurring role (3 episodes)
2015–16	2Kaha	Herself/Presenter	
2018	Only in Aotearoa	Various roles	
2018	Third Term	Zambesi	Pilot; webseries (not yet released)
2019	Fresh Eggs	Tina	
2020	The Dead Lands	Marama	Season 1; guest role (2 episodes)
2020	Home and Away	Gemma Parata	Season 33; recurring role (40 episodes)
2020	Mean Mums	Ms. Lightfoot	Season 2; guest role (recurring)
2020	The Wilds	Susan	Pilot
2021	Good Grief	Trisha	Season 1 (4 episodes)
2022	The Brokenwood Mysteries	Karla Whitimai	Season 8; guest role (1 episode)
2023	Sweet Tooth	Dolly	Season 2; guest role (2 episodes)
2023	Double Parked	Cass	Season 1; guest role (1 episode)
2024	Spinal Destination	Tessa Rivers	Season 1; main role (6 episodes)
2024	Friends Like Her	Stacey	TV series
2024	N00b	Aroha Bennett	Recurring role

Non-acting work
Year	Title	Notes
2020	The New Legends of Monkey	Chaperone (Season 2, episode 1)
2021	Sweet Tooth	Child acting coach (Season 1 – 7 episodes)
2022	Raised by Refugees	Director (Season 1 – 3 episodes)
2024	Pack Rat	Intimacy coordinator (short film)
2024	Went Up the Hill	Child performance coach (feature film)
2025	He Had It Coming	Intimacy coordinator (TV series; post-production)
