= Owen Marshall =

New Zealand writer (born 1941)

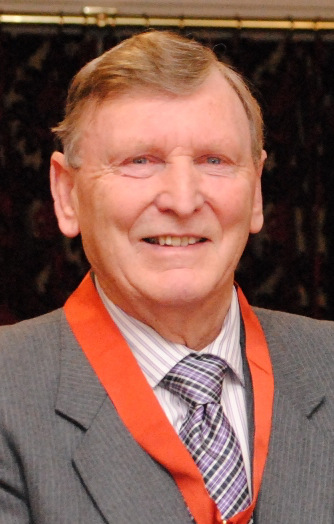
Marshall in 2012

Owen Marshall Jones CNZM (born 17 August 1941), who writes under the pen name Owen Marshall, is a New Zealand short story writer and novelist.

== Early life and family ==
Marshall was born in Te Kūiti on 17 August 1941. He was the third of nine children; his father was a Methodist minister, and his mother (whose maiden name was Marshall) died when he was two. His father remarried about three years later and went on to have a further six children. The family lived in Blenheim and Timaru, and Marshall was educated at Timaru Boys' High School. He graduated from the University of Canterbury with a Master of Arts degree in English in 1964, and taught at Waitaki Boys' High School for 25 years before becoming a full-time author.

Marshall is the older half-brother of Rhys Jones.

== Awards and honours ==
In 1985 and 1988, Marshall received the Lilian Ida Smith Award (Fiction). In the 2000 New Year Honours, he was appointed an Officer of the New Zealand Order of Merit, for services to literature, and in the 2012 Queen's Birthday and Diamond Jubilee Honours, he was promoted to Companion of the New Zealand Order of Merit, also for services to literature. In 2013, he was the winner of the fiction section of the Prime Minister's Awards for Literary Achievement

== Works ==
- Supper Waltz Wilson, and Other New Zealand Stories. Christchurch : Pegasus, 1979.
- The Master of Big Jingles & Other Stories. Dunedin : McIndoe, 1982.
- The Day Hemingway Died, and Other Stories. Dunedin : McIndoe, 1984.
- The Lynx Hunter, and Other Stories. Dunedin : McIndoe, 1987.
- An indirect geography [radio narrative] by Owen Marshall. 1990.
- The Divided World : Selected Stories. Dunedin : John McIndoe, 1989.
- Tomorrow We Save the Orphans : Fiction. Dunedin : John McIndoe, 1992.
- The Ace of Diamonds Gang and Other Stories: McIndoe Press, 1993.
- A Many Coated Man. Dunedin: Longacre Press, 1995 (Novel)
- Timeless Land. Painter, Grahame Sydney; poet, Brian Turner; writer, Owen Marshall; with an introduction by Sam Neill. Dunedin : Longacre Press, 1995.
- The Best of Owen Marshall's Short Stories. Auckland : Random House, 1997.
- Harlequin Rex. Auckland: Vintage, 1999. (Novel)
- When Gravity Snaps. Auckland: Vintage, 2002. (Short stories)
- The Larnachs. Auckland: Vintage, 2011. (Novel, based on events in the life of William Larnach)
- Living as a Moon. Auckland: Vintage, 2011. (Short stories)
- Love as a Stranger. Auckland: Vintage, 2016. (Novel)
- Pearly Gates. Auckland: Vintage, 2019. (Novel)
- Return to Harikoa Bay. Auckland: Vintage, 2022. (Short stories)
- New Stories. Auckland: Penguin, 2024. (Short stories)

Two of Marshall's short stories have been turned into feature films. Coming Home in the Dark (2021) is a psychological thriller directed by James Ashcroft. Horror film, The Rule of Jenny Pen, also directed by Ashcroft, was released in 2024.

== See also ==
- New Zealand literature
