= Daniel Gillies =

New Zealand actor and filmmaker

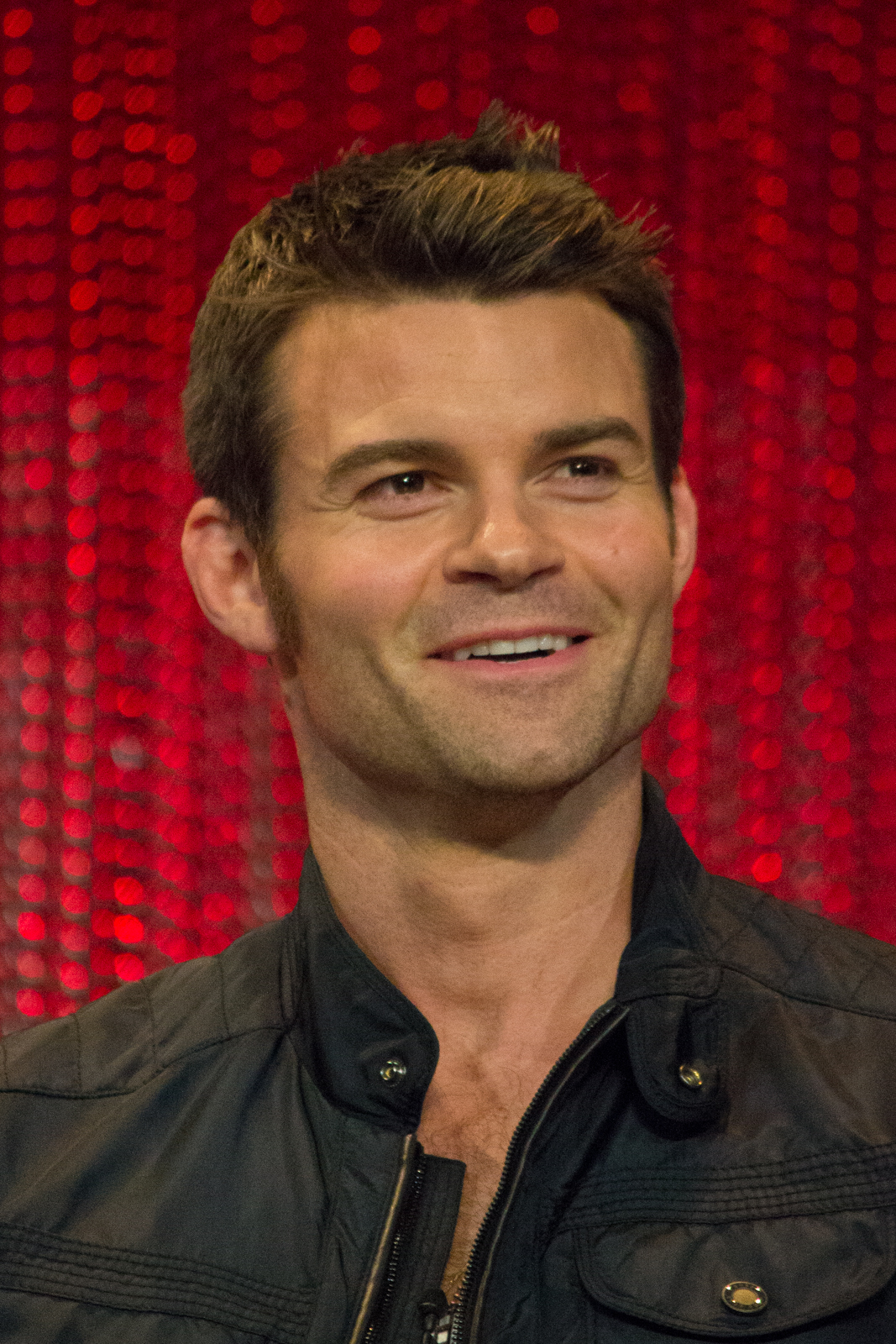
- Gillies at the 2014 PaleyFest
- Born: Daniel Joshua Gillies; 14 March 1976 (age 50); Winnipeg, Manitoba, Canada
- Citizenship: Canada; New Zealand
- Occupations: Actor; screenwriter; director; producer
- Years active: 1998–present
- Spouse: Rachael Leigh Cook (m. 2004; div. 2021)
- Children: 2

Daniel Joshua Gillies (born March 14, 1976) is a New Zealand actor, film producer, director and screenwriter. He played the role of Elijah Mikaelson on The Vampire Diaries and its spin-off, The Originals; Dr. Joel Goran on Saving Hope. He wrote and directed the 2012 film, Broken Kingdom.

== Early life ==
Gillies was born in Winnipeg, Manitoba, Canada, to parents from New Zealand. When he was five, his parents decided to return to New Zealand, moving to Invercargill and then Hamilton. Though born into a family of strong medical background (his father is a pediatrician, his mother a nurse, and he is descended from the renowned ENT/plastic surgery pioneer Sir Harold Gillies), Gillies became interested in acting because he said it was "the only thing [he] was ever any good at".

Frustrated with the lack of opportunities in New Zealand, he moved to Sydney, Australia for six weeks in 2001 before going to Canada for two months, where he worked as a waiter and dishwasher until deciding to move to Los Angeles.

== Career ==
Gillies began his career starring in several Auckland Theatre Company productions, before landing a two-season lead role in the television drama Street Legal. After deciding that his acting options in his native New Zealand were limited, Gillies explored his options in Sydney and Canada. Gillies then moved to Los Angeles and was soon cast in the movies Bride and Prejudice and Spider-Man 2.

Since 2002, Gillies has worked in North American film and television productions. Before landing lead roles in television series, Gillies landed guests spots on television shows such as Masters of Horror, NCIS, and True Blood. In 2010, he was cast on the hit The CW drama The Vampire Diaries as Elijah Mikaelson. In 2013, CW created a successful spin-off of The Originals, which chronicled the lives of the first vampires. Gillies's recurring part as Elijah from The Vampire Diaries became a lead part in The Originals. A potential nightmare existed for CW since Gillies was already under contract to play Joel Goran in the supernatural series, Saving Hope. Saving Hope initially aired in the US on NBC, but the series was not renewed although it continued to run in Canada. He continued both shows. In 2012, Gillies wrote, directed and starred with then wife Rachael Leigh Cook in Broken Kingdom.

From 2019 to 2022, Gillies portrayed the role of Mark Monroe in the Netflix 2019 romantic drama television series Virgin River. He was in the show for four seasons. In January 2021, Gillies starred in the psychological thriller film Coming Home in the Dark, based on a 1995 short-story of the same name by Owen Marshall. In 2022, Gillies was cast as Charlie Tate in the second season of the ABC series The Newsreader.

== Personal life ==
Gillies married American actress Rachael Leigh Cook on 8 August 2004. Together they have a daughter, born in September 2013, and a son, born in April 2015. In an interview in 2017, Gillies revealed that he would undergo a vasectomy to prevent further births, citing concerns about his age and energy levels. He stated: "I want to be able to give these two my love and my attention and my care. I would like to stop now."

On 13 June 2019, both Cook and Gillies announced on Instagram that they mutually decided to separate and they also said that they wanted it to be as discreet as possible for the sake of their kids. On 10 July 2020 Gillies filed for divorce from Cook. Their divorce was finalized on 10 March 2021.

Since 2021, Gillies has been in a relationship with cellist Julia Misaki.

== Filmography ==
=== Film ===
Year	Title	Role	Notes
1998	A Soldier's Sweetheart	Medic	
1998	Pleasantville	Fireman #2	
2001	No One Can Hear You	Dirk Mettcalfe	
2002	Various Positions	Marcel	
2004	Spider-Man 2	John Jameson	
2004	Evil Remains	Mark	
2004	Bride and Prejudice	Johnny Wickham	
2006	The Sensation of Sight	Dylan	
2007	Captivity	Gary Dexter	
2007	Matters of Life and Death	Jimmy	Short film
2008	Uncross the Stars	Troy	
2012	Broken Kingdom	Jason '80'	Also director and producer
2020	Occupation: Rainfall	Wing Commander Hayes	
2021	Coming Home in the Dark	Mandrake	

=== Television ===
Year	Title	Role	Notes
1999	Young Hercules	Antos	Episode: "My Fair Lilith"
2000	Cleopatra 2525	Hot Guy	Episode: "Mind Games"
2000	Street Legal	Tim O'Connor	Seasons 1 & 2
2002	Mentors	King Arthur	Episode: "Once and Future King"
2002	Jeremiah	Simon	Episode: "The Long Road: Part 1"
2002	Snow Queen	Delfont Chalfont	Television movie
2005	Into the West	Ethan Biggs	Miniseries
2007	Masters of Horror	Jack Miller	Episode: "Dream Cruise"
2010	The Glades	Dave Rollins	Episode: "Doppelganger"
2010	True Blood	Jon	Episode: "I Smell a Rat"
2010	NCIS	Royal Marine Major Peter Malloy	Episode: "Royals & Loyals"
2010–2014	The Vampire Diaries	Elijah Mikaelson	Recurring role (seasons 2–5)
2012–2015	Saving Hope	Dr. Joel Goran	Seasons 1–3
2013–2018	The Originals	Elijah Mikaelson	Also director (2 episodes)
2017	SEAL Team	Nate Massey	Episode: "Pilot"
2017	The Lost Wife of Robert Durst	Robert Durst	Television film
2019–2022	Virgin River	Mark Monroe	Main (season 1) Guest (seasons 2–4)
2022	The Newsreader	Charlie	Main role (season 2)
2024–2025	Sight Unseen	Jake Campbell	Main (Season 1)

=== Voice acting ===
Year	Title	Role	Notes
2019–2020	Thor: Metal Gods	Various/all	Episodes 1-15
